= Khlong Udom Chonlajorn railway halt =

Railway station in Thailand

Coordinates: 13°42′57.7″N 100°53′49.0″E

Khlong Udom Chonlajorn คลองอุดมชลจร
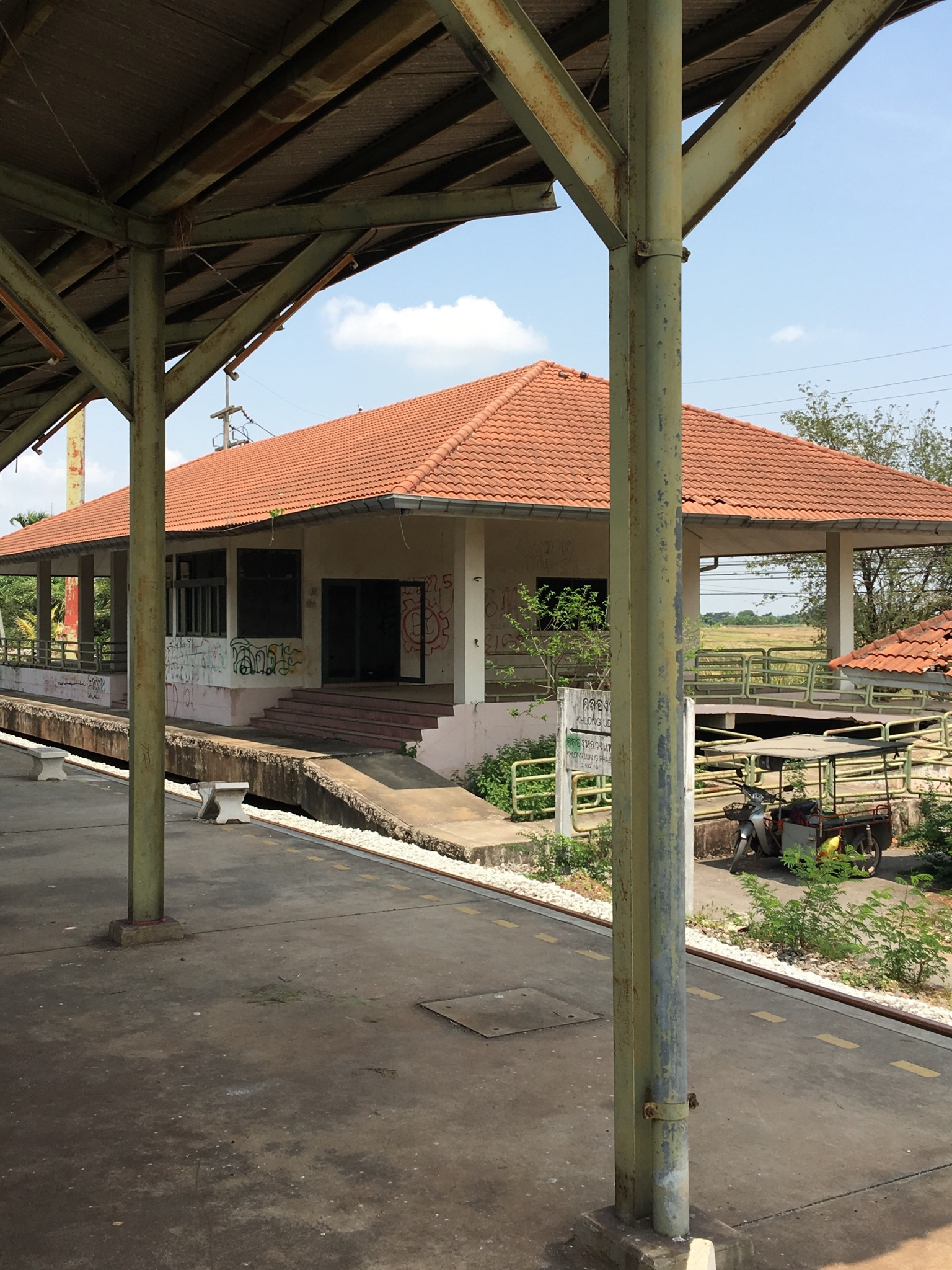

General information
- Location: Khlong Udom Chonlajorn Subdistrict, Mueang Chachoengsao District, Chachoengsao Province
- Owner: State Railway of Thailand (SRT)
- Line: Eastern Line

Other information
- Station code: ดจ.

Services
Preceding station	State Railway of Thailand	Following station
Khlong Luang Phaeng towards Hua Lamphong	Eastern Line	Preng towards Chuk Samet or Poipet (Cambodia)
Location

Khlong Udom Chonlajorn Railway Halt (Thai: ป้ายหยุดรถไฟคลองอุดมชลจร, สถานีรถไฟคลองอุดมชลจร) is a railway halt in eastern Thailand, located in the area of Khlong Udom Chonlajorn Subdistrict, Mueang Chachoengsao District, Chachoengsao Province.

This station is a part of the eastern railway line, can be considered as the first stop of the province on this line. It is 43.43 km (about 26 mi) from Bangkok railway station (Hua Lamphong).

Although the halt has a station building, it was abandoned like other nearby halts between Hua Takhe and Chachoengsao Junction.
