= Bang Lamung railway station =

Railway station in Chonburi, Thailand

Coordinates: 13.0345°N 100.9400°E

Bang Lamung บางละมุง
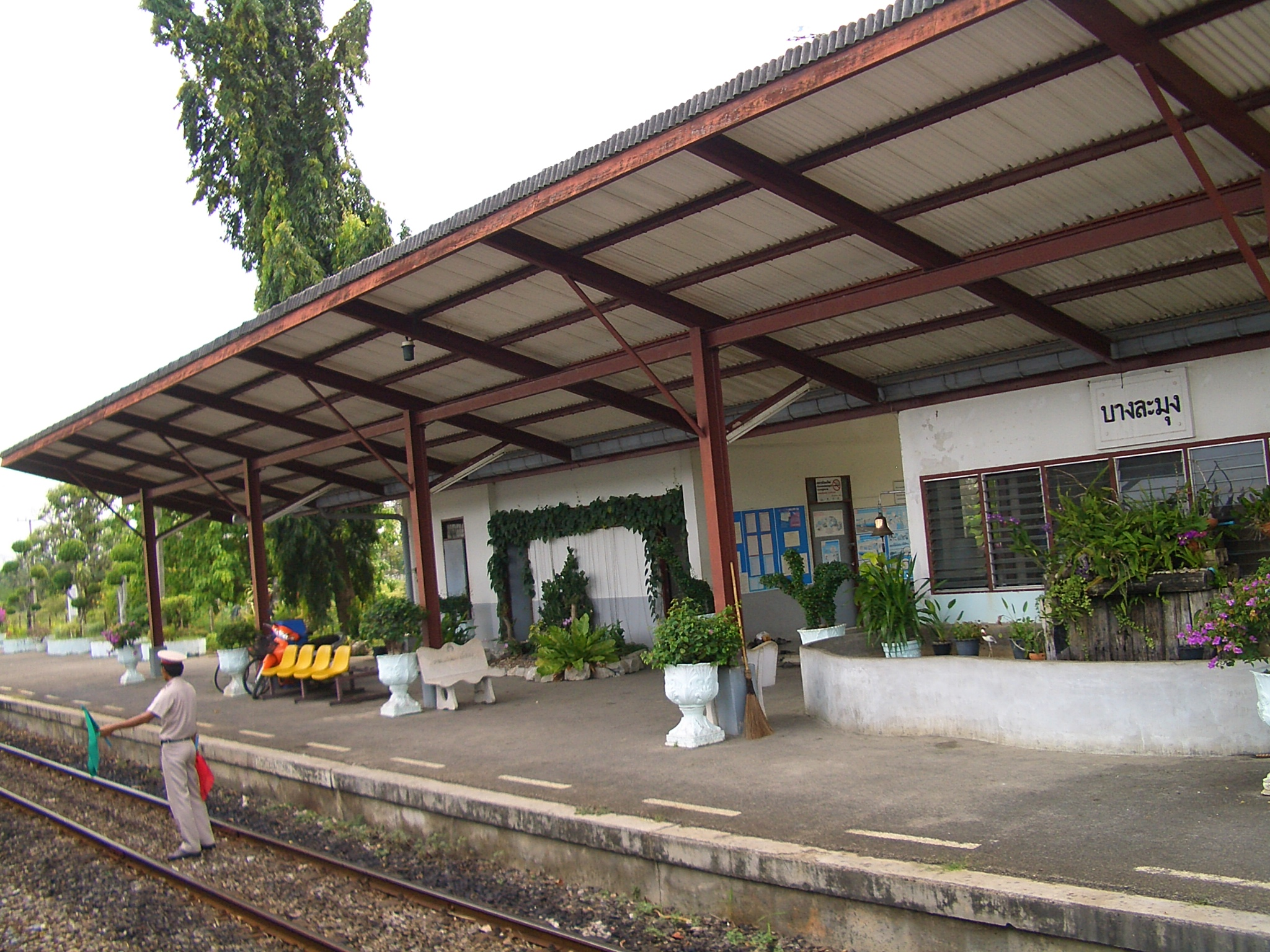

General information
- Location: Bang Lamung Subdistrict, Bang Lamung District; Chon Buri Province; Thailand
- Operator: State Railway of Thailand
- Manager: Ministry of Transport
- Line: Chuk Samet Main Line
- Platforms: 1
- Tracks: 3

Other information
- Station code: มุ.
- Classification: Class 1

History
- Opened: July 1989

Services
Preceding station	State Railway of Thailand	Following station
Si Racha Junction towards Hua Lamphong	Eastern Line	Pattaya towards Chuk Samet
Location

Bang Lamung station (Thai: สถานีบางละมุง) is a railway station located in Bang Lamung Subdistrict, Bang Lamung District, Chon Buri. It is a class 1 railway station located 144.089 km (89.5 mi) from Bangkok railway station. It opened in July 1989 as part of the Eastern Line Chachoengsao Junction–Sattahip Port section. Nearby is the Ban Rong Po Gas Refinery, owned by PTT.
