= Phra Chom Klao railway halt =

Railway stop in Lat Krabang, Thailand

Coordinates: 13°43′40.8″N 100°46′33.6″E

Phra Chom Klao พระจอมเกล้า
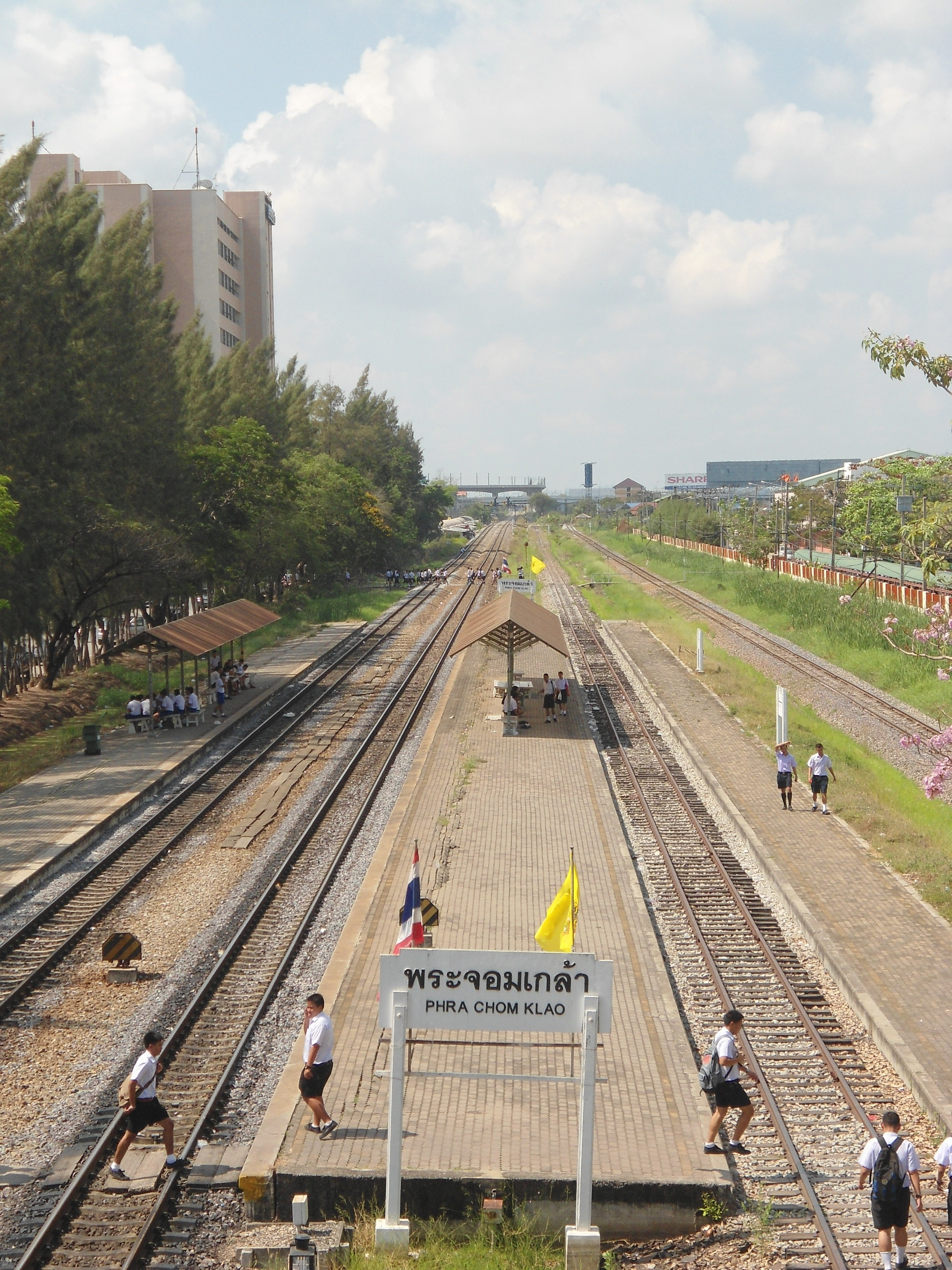

General information
- Location: Lat Krabang Subdistrict, Lat Krabang District, Bangkok
- Owner: State Railway of Thailand (SRT)
- Line: Eastern Line

Other information
- Station code: พม.

Services
Preceding station	State Railway of Thailand	Following station
Lat Krabang towards Hua Lamphong	Eastern Line	Hua Takhe towards Chuk Samet or Poipet (Cambodia)
Location

Phra Chom Klao Railway Halt (Thai: ป้ายหยุดรถไฟพระจอมเกล้า) is a railway halt of the eastern railway line located in the campus of King Mongkut's Institute of Technology Ladkrabang (KMITL), Lat Krabang Subdistrict, Lat Krabang District, eastern Bangkok.

It is 30.33km (18 mi) from Hua Lamphong (Bangkok railway station) and is 830m (2,723 ft) away from the next station, Hua Takhe.

The halt bisects a university and a Faculty of Engineering.

The scenery around Phra Chom Klao makes it a popular place for photography, with a backdrop of pink Tabebuia trees blooming during the summer months (March–April). It is especially popular during graduation season, when students take commemorative photos, sometimes posing alongside the trains.
