= Sa Kaeo railway station =

Railway station in Thailand

Coordinates: 13.8271°N 102.0752°E

Sa Kaeo สระแก้ว
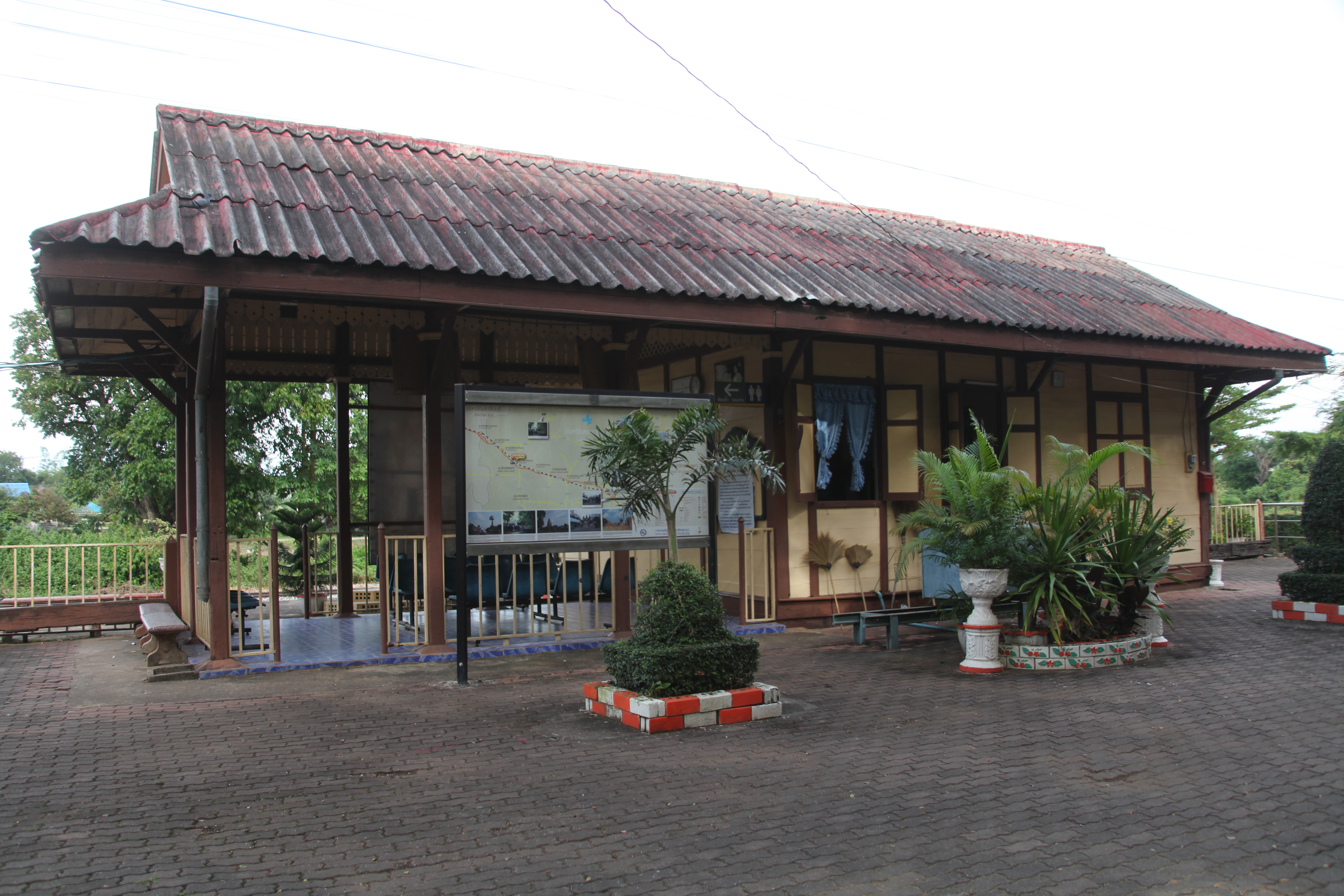

General information
- Location: Sa Kaeo Subdistrict, Mueang Sa Kaeo District; Sa Kaeo Province; Thailand
- Operator: State Railway of Thailand
- Manager: Ministry of Transport
- Line: Aranyaprathet Main Line
- Platforms: 1
- Tracks: 2

Construction
- Structure type: At-grade

Other information
- Classification: Class 2

History
- Opened: 8 November 1926

Services
Preceding station	State Railway of Thailand	Following station
Sala Lamduan Halt towards Hua Lamphong	Eastern Line	Sa Kaeo Provincial Office Halt towards Poipet (Cambodia)
Location

Sa Kaeo railway station is a railway station located in Sa Kaeo Subdistrict, Sa Kaeo City, Sa Kaeo. The station is a class 2 railway station located 205.259 km (127.5 mi) from Bangkok railway station. Sa Kaeo Station opened in November 1926 as part of the Eastern Line Kabin Buri–Aranyaprathet section.
