= Preng railway station =

Railway station in Thailand

Preng เปรง
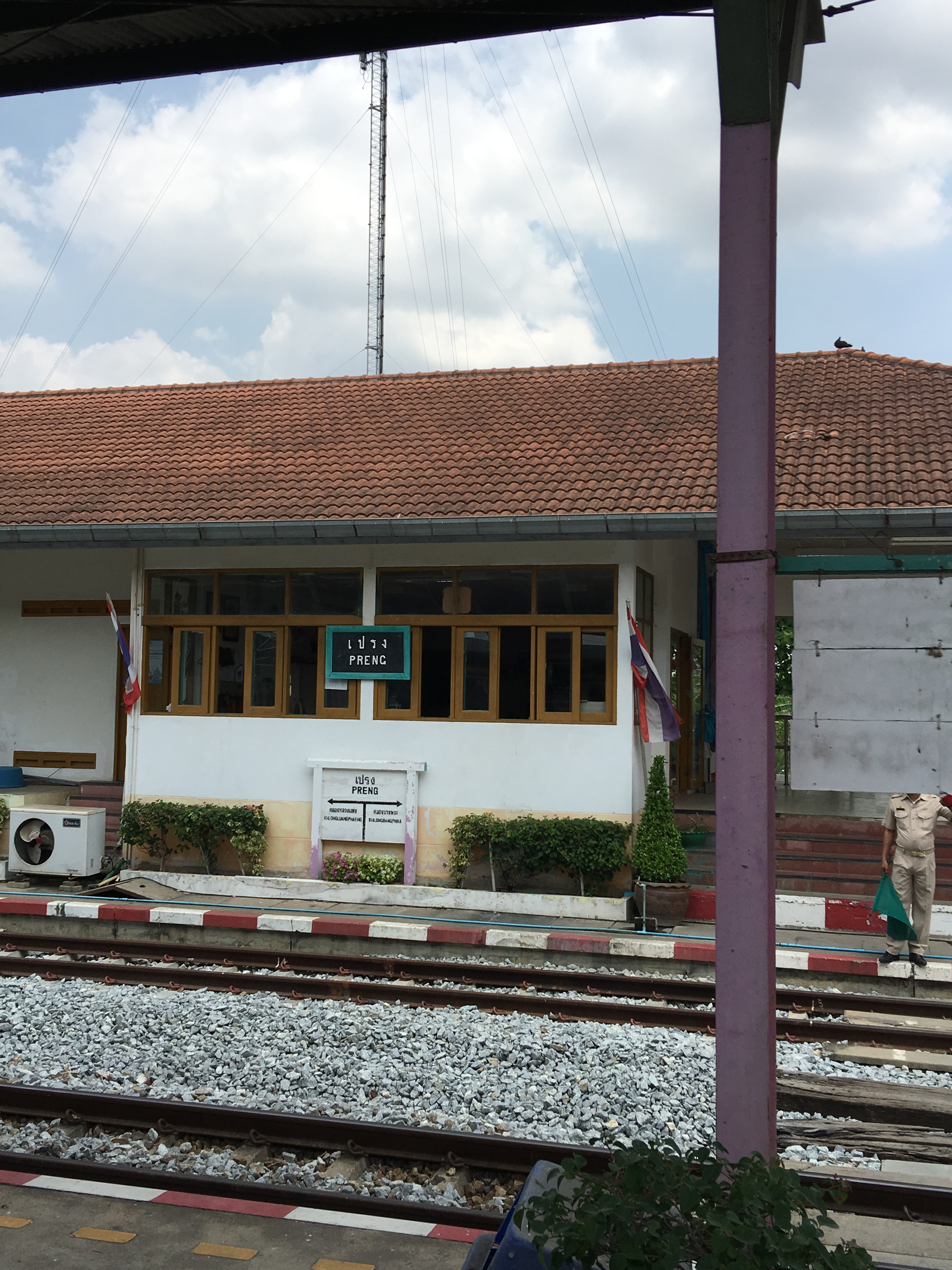

General information
- Location: Khlong Preng Subdistrict, Mueang Chachoengsao District, Chachoengsao Province
- Coordinates: 13.7125°N 100.9250°E
- Owner: State Railway of Thailand
- Line: Eastern Line
- Platforms: 3
- Tracks: 3

Other information
- Station code: คป.

History
- Former names: Khlong Preng

Services
Preceding station	State Railway of Thailand	Following station
Khlong Udom Chonlajorn Halt towards Hua Lamphong	Eastern Line	Khlong Kwaeng Klan Halt towards Chuk Samet or Poipet (Cambodia)
Location

Preng railway station is a railway station located in Khlong Preng Subdistrict, Mueang Chachoengsao District, Chachoengsao Province. It is a class 3 railway station located 46.49 km (28.9 mi) from Bangkok railway station.
