= Prachinburi railway station =

Railway station in Na Mueang, Thailand

Coordinates: 14.0708°N 101.3736°E

Prachinburi ปราจีนบุรี
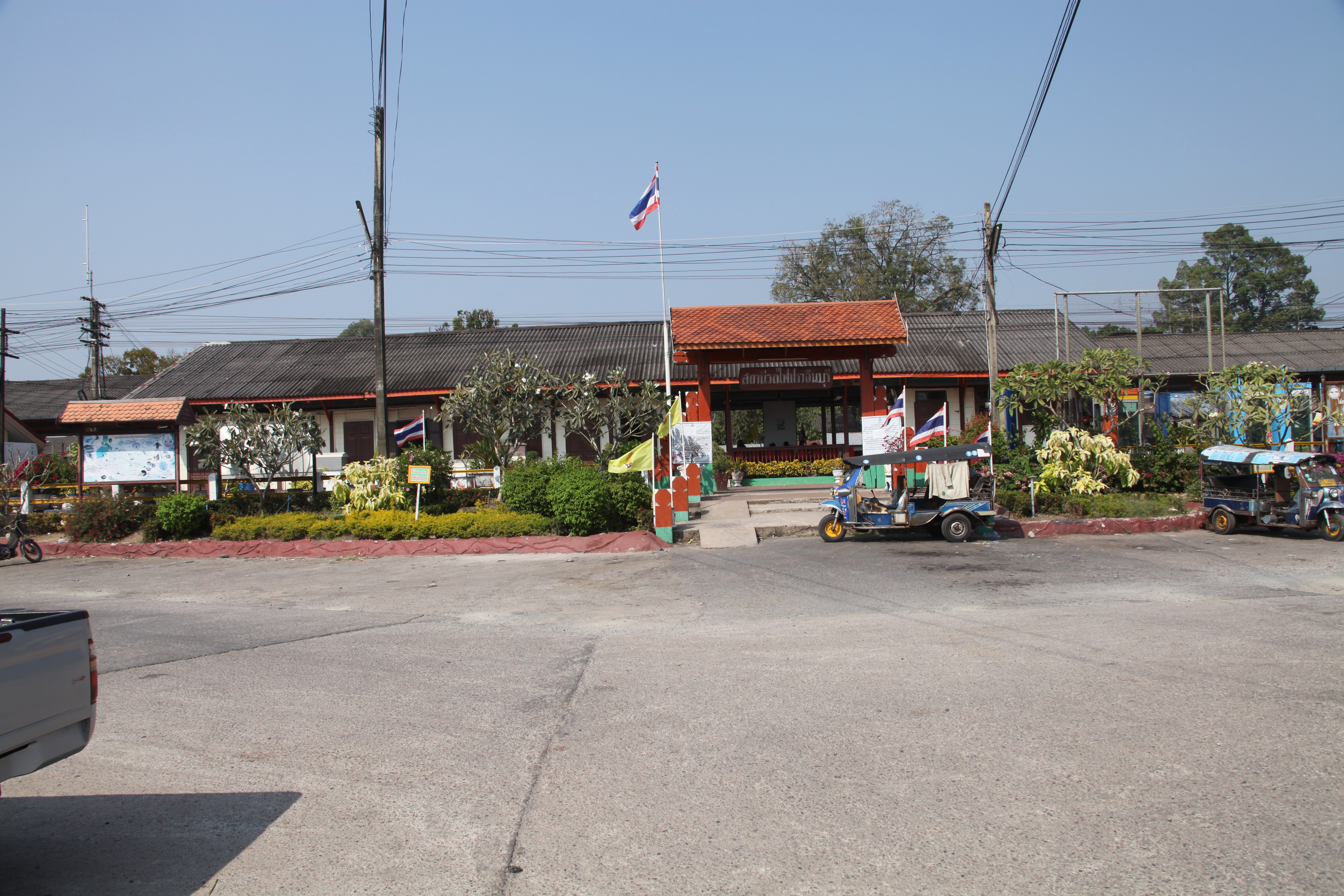

General information
- Location: Rat Damri Road, Na Mueang Subdistrict, Mueang Prachinburi District; Prachinburi Province; Thailand
- Operator: State Railway of Thailand
- Manager: Ministry of Transport
- Line: Aranyaprathet Main Line
- Platforms: 2
- Tracks: 4

Construction
- Structure type: At-grade

Other information
- Station code: ปจ.
- Classification: Class 1

History
- Opened: 1 January 1925

Services
Preceding station	State Railway of Thailand	Following station
Ban Pak Phli towards Hua Lamphong	Eastern Line	Nong Krachap Halt towards Poipet (Cambodia)
Location

Prachinburi railway station is a railway station in Na Mueang Subdistrict, Prachin Buri City, Prachinburi Province. The station is a class 1 railway station located 121.781 km (75.7 mi) from Bangkok railway station. The station opened in January 1925, as part of the Eastern Line Chachoengsao Junction–Kabin Buri section.

== Train services ==
- Ordinary Train No. 275/276 Bangkok – Ban Klong Luk Border – Bangkok
- Ordinary Train No. 277/278 Bangkok – Kabin Buri – Bangkok
- Ordinary Train No. 279/280 Bangkok – Ban Klong Luk Border – Bangkok
- Ordinary Train No. 281/282 Bangkok – Kabin Buri – Bangkok
- Ordinary Train No. 371/372 Bangkok – Prachin Buri – Bangkok
