= Ban Pak Phli railway station =

Railway station in Thailand

Ban Pak Phli บ้านปากพลี

General information
- Location: Pak Phli Subdistrict, Pak Phli District; Nakhon Nayok Province; Thailand
- Coordinates: 14.0742°N 101.3153°E
- Operator: State Railway of Thailand
- Manager: Ministry of Transport
- Line: Aranyaprathet Main Line
- Platforms: 1
- Tracks: 2

Construction
- Structure type: At-grade

Other information
- Station code: าป.
- Classification: Class 3

Services
Preceding station	State Railway of Thailand	Following station
Nong Nam Khao Halt towards Hua Lamphong	Eastern Line	Prachinburi towards Poipet (Cambodia)
Location

Ban Pak Phli station (Thai: สถานีบ้านปากพลี) is a railway station located in Pak Phli Subdistrict, Pak Phli District, Nakhon Nayok Province. It is a class 3 railway station located 115.28 km (71.6 mi) from Bangkok railway station. It is the de facto railway station of Nakhon Nayok Province, despite being located almost at the border of the province almost twenty kilometres from Nakhon Nayok Town. The other railway station in Nakhon Nayok is Ongkharak railway station on the Phra Phutthachai freight line.
