= Chonburi railway station =

Railway station in Chonburi, Thailand

Chonburi ชลบุรี
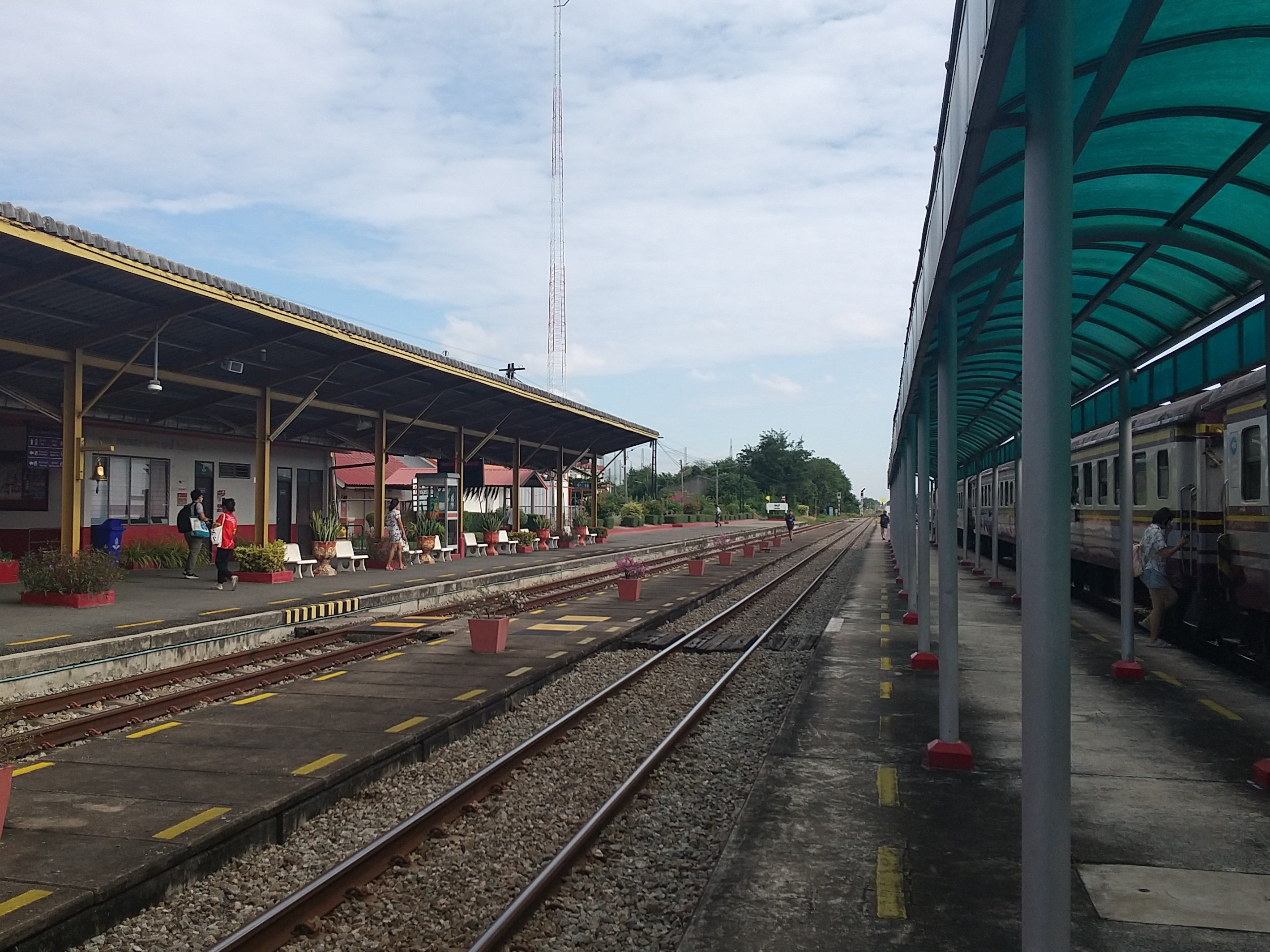
- Chonburi station in 2023

General information
- Location: Ban Suan Subdistrict, Mueang Chonburi District; Chonburi Province; Thailand
- Coordinates: 13.3423°N 100.9982°E
- Operator: State Railway of Thailand
- Manager: Ministry of Transport
- Line: Chuk Samet Main Line
- Platforms: 3
- Tracks: 5

Construction
- Structure type: At-grade

Other information
- Station code: ชบ.
- Classification: Class 1

History
- Opened: July 1989

Services
Preceding station	State Railway of Thailand	Following station
Phan Thong towards Hua Lamphong	Eastern Line	Bang Phra towards Chuk Samet
Location

Chonburi station (Thai: สถานีชลบุรี) is a railway station located Ban Suan Subdistrict, Chonburi City, Chonburi. It is a class 1 railway station 107.795 km (67.0 mi) from Bangkok railway station. The station opened in July 1989 as part of the Eastern Line Chachoengsao Junction–Sattahip Port section.
