= Khao Chi Chan Junction railway station =

Railway station in Chonburi, Thailand

Khao Chi Chan Junction ชุมทางเขาชีจรรย์
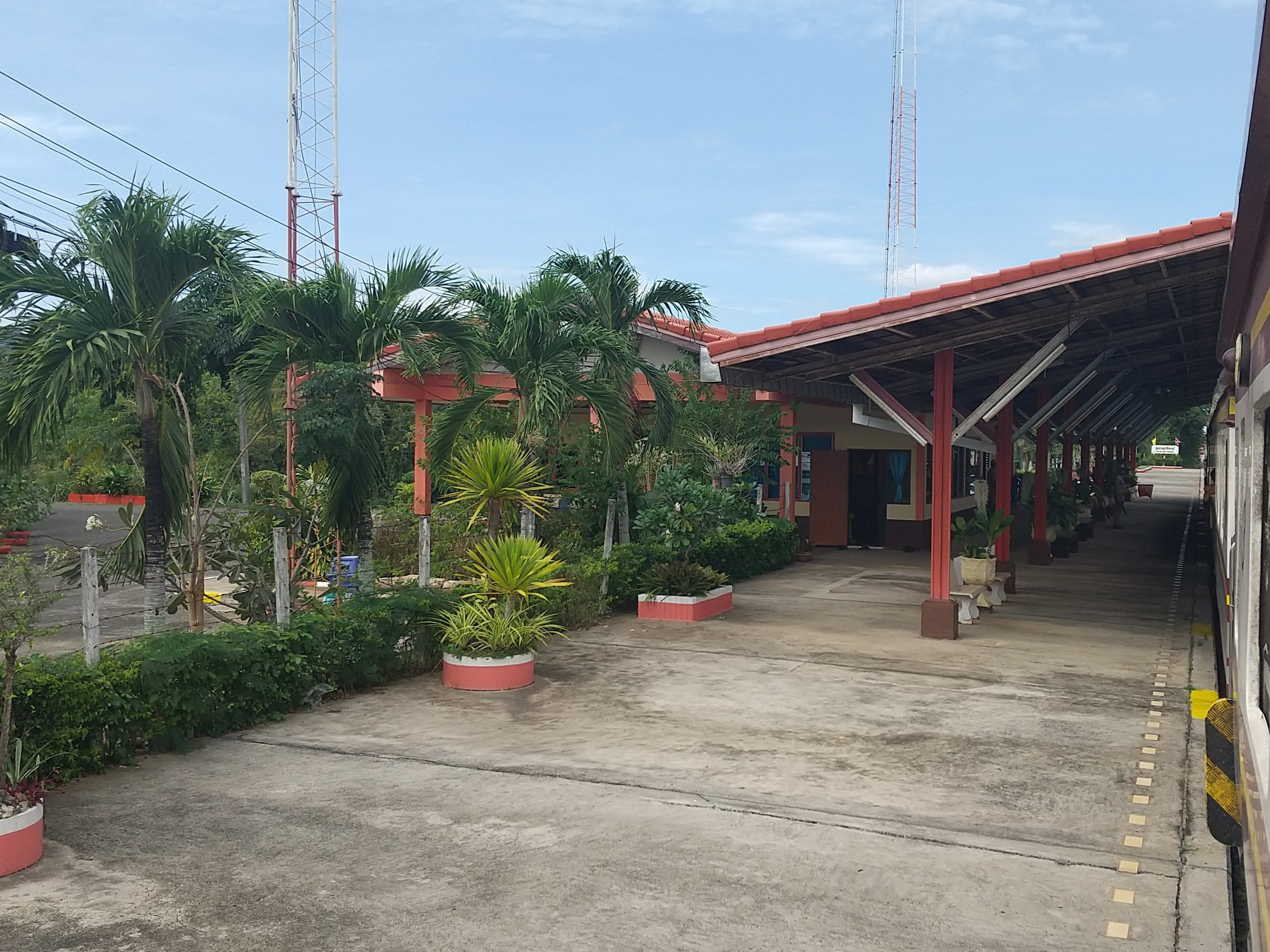

General information
- Location: Bang Sare Subdistrict, Sattahip District; Chon Buri Province; Thailand
- Operator: State Railway of Thailand
- Manager: Ministry of Transport
- Lines: Chuk Samet Main Line; Map Ta Phut Port Branch
- Platforms: 1
- Tracks: 4

Construction
- Structure type: At-grade

Other information
- Station code: ชจ.
- Classification: Class 3

History
- Opened: July 1989

Services
| Preceding station | State Railway of Thailand | Following station |
|---|---|---|
| Suan Nong Nuch Halt towards Hua Lamphong | Eastern Line | Ban Phlu Ta Luang towards Chuk Samet |
| Terminus | Eastern Line Map Ta Phut Freight Line | Ban Chang towards Map Ta Phut Port |
Location

Khao Chi Chan Junction railway station is a railway station located in Bang Sare Subdistrict, Sattahip District, Chon Buri. It is a class 3 railway station located 180.0 km (111.8 mi) from Bangkok railway station. The station opened in July 1989 as part of the Eastern Line Chachoengsao Junction–Sattahip Port section. It is the junction for the Chuk Samet Main Line and the Map Ta Phut Port Line.
