= Pattaya railway station =

Railway station in Chonburi, Thailand

Coordinates: 12.9402°N 100.9093°E

Pattaya พัทยา
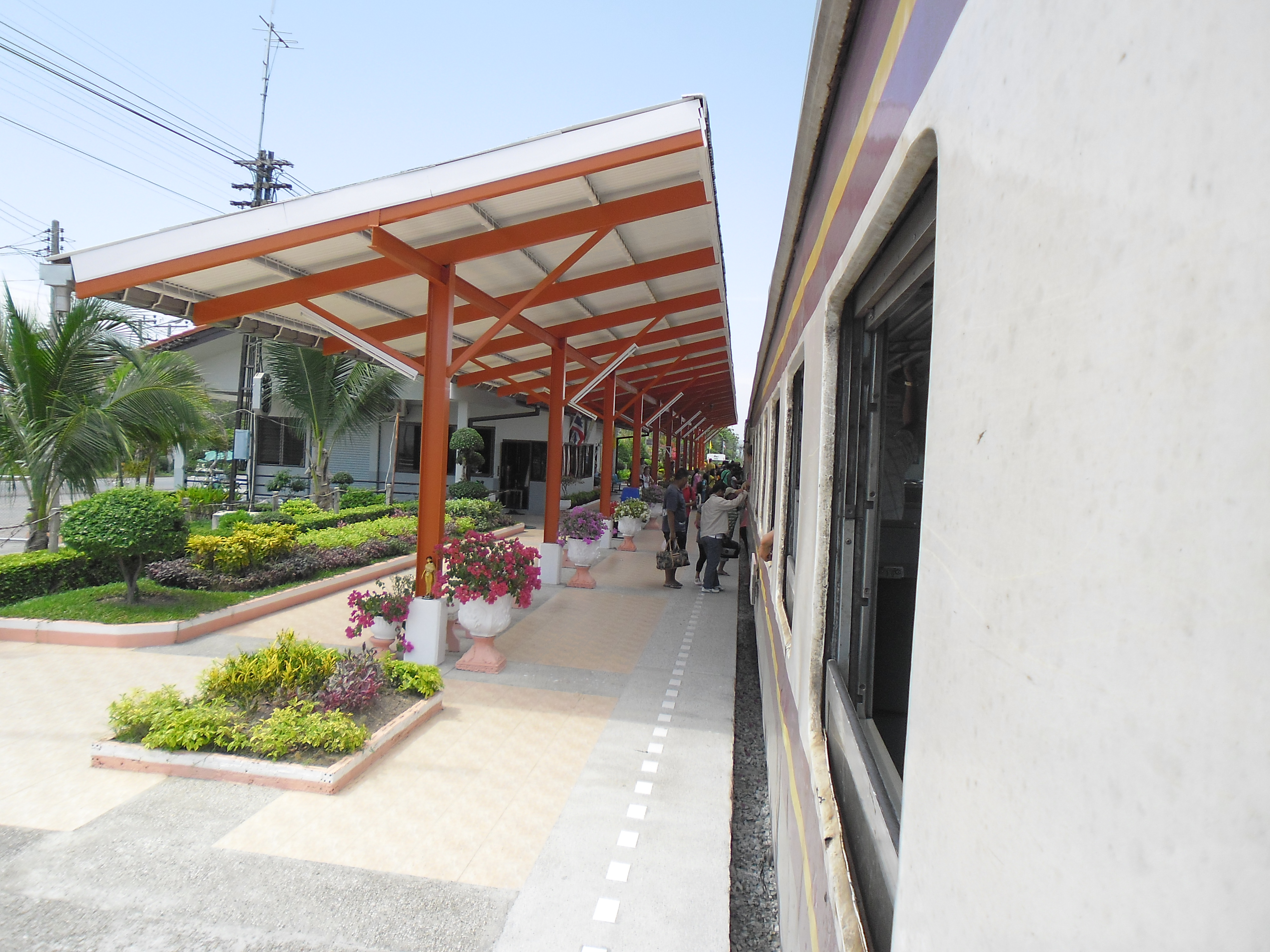

General information
- Location: Chon Buri-Pattaya Road, Nong Prue Subdistrict, Bang Lamung District; Chonburi Province; Thailand
- Operator: State Railway of Thailand
- Manager: Ministry of Transport
- Line: Chuk Samet Main Line
- Platforms: 1
- Tracks: 3

Construction
- Structure type: At-grade

Other information
- Station code: พา.
- Classification: Class 3

History
- Opened: 14 July 1989

Services
Preceding station	State Railway of Thailand	Following station
Bang Lamung towards Hua Lamphong	Eastern Line	Pattaya Tai Halt towards Chuk Samet
Proposed
Preceding station	Airport Rail Link	Following station
Si Racha towards Don Mueang	High-Speed Rail Linking Three Airports	U-Tapao Terminus
Location

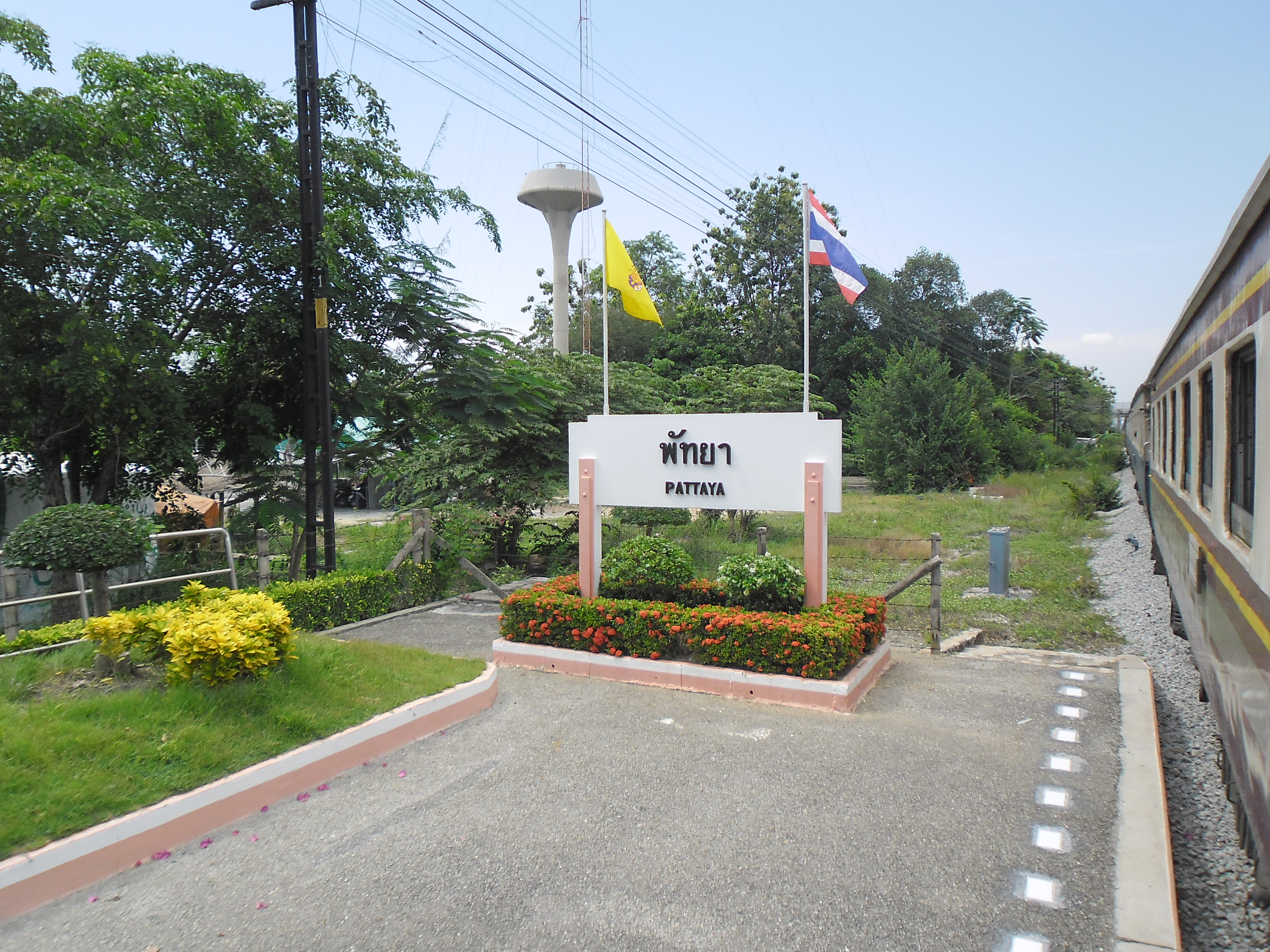
Signage

Pattaya railway station is a railway station located in Nong Prue Subdistrict, Bang Lamung District, Chon Buri, located 3 km east of downtown Pattaya. It is a class 3 railway station located 155.145 km (96.4 mi) from Bangkok railway station. It opened in July 1989 as part of the Eastern Line Chachoengsao Junction–Sattahip Port section. Pattaya Station has the highest daily ridership of all the stations on the Chuk Samet Main Line.

== Future Pattaya HSR station ==
The Don Mueang–Suvarnabhumi–U-Tapao high-speed railway is planned to have a stop in Pattaya. Originally the HSR station was planned to be situated near Bali Hai Pier, connecting to a new Pattaya Monorail, however it is now planned to be built outside the city center in Huai Yai in Bang Lamung District. In February 2023 Pattaya deputy mayor Manote Nongyai confirmed the station would be built on a 900 rai site in Nong Prue tambon, Bang Lamung district and include a mixed-use development. Public hearings were held in May 2023.
