= Si Racha Junction railway station =

Railway station in Surasak, Thailand

Coordinates: 13.1560°N 100.9458°E

Si Racha Junction ชุมทางศรีราชา
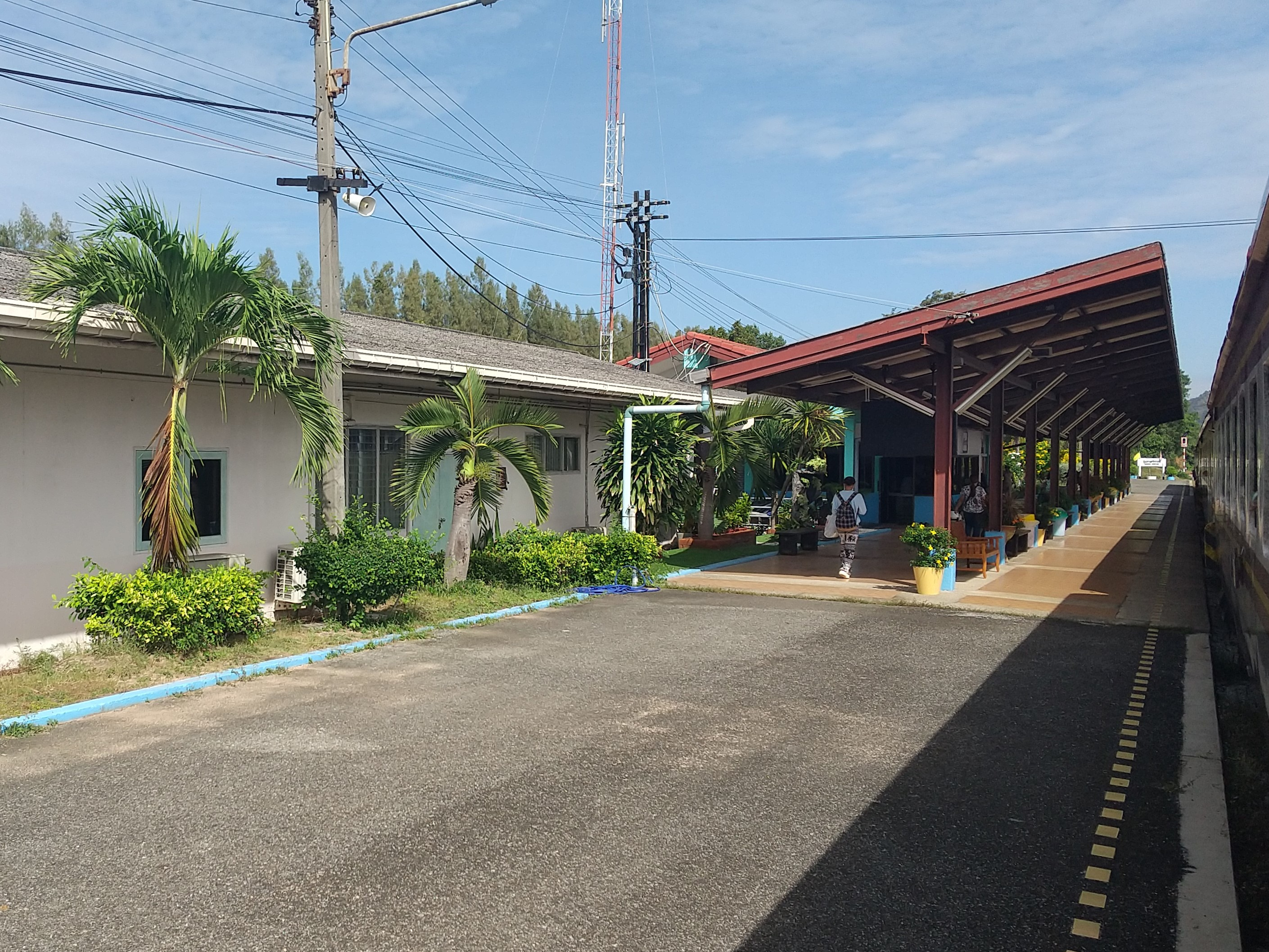

General information
- Location: Surasak Subdistrict, Si Racha District; Chon Buri Province; Thailand
- Operator: State Railway of Thailand
- Manager: Ministry of Transport
- Lines: Chuk Samet Main Line; Laem Chabang Branch
- Platforms: 2
- Tracks: 7

Construction
- Structure type: At-grade

Other information
- Station code: ศช.
- Classification: Class 3

History
- Opened: July 1989

Services
Preceding station	State Railway of Thailand	Following station
Khao Phrabat Halt towards Hua Lamphong	Eastern Line	Bang Lamung towards Chuk Samet
Terminus	Eastern Line Laem Chabang Freight Line	Laem Chabang towards Laem Chabang Port
Location

Si Racha Junction Railway Junction is a railway station located in Surasak Subdistrict, Si Racha District, Chon Buri. It is a class 3 railway station located 130.605 km (81.2 mi) from Bangkok railway station. It opened in July 1989 as part of the Chachoengsao Junction–Sattahip Port section. Later, the Laem Chabang Port Line, for freight trains only, opened in 1992, thus turning this station into a junction.
