= Bang Nam Prieo railway station =

Railway station in Bang Khanak, Thailand

Coordinates: 13.8501°N 101.1018°E

Bang Nam Priao บางน้ำเปรี้ยว

General information
- Location: Bang Khanak Subdistrict, Bang Nam Priao District; Chachoengsao Province; Thailand
- Operator: State Railway of Thailand
- Manager: Ministry of Transport
- Line: Aranyaprathet Main Line
- Platforms: 1
- Tracks: 3

Construction
- Structure type: At-grade

Other information
- Station code: บย.
- Classification: Class 3

Services
Preceding station	State Railway of Thailand	Following station
Phrong Akat Halt towards Hua Lamphong	Eastern Line	Khlong Sip Kao Junction towards Poipet (Cambodia)
Location

Bang Nam Priao station, (Thai: สถานีบางน้ำเปรี้ยว) stylised on the current railway station sign as Bang Nam Prieo railway station, is a railway station located in Bang Nam Priao District, Chachoengsao Province, Thailand. The station lies on the Eastern Line Aranyaprathet Main Line.
