= Ban Phai Na Bun Junction railway station =

Railway station in Saraburi, Thailand

Ban Phai Na Bun Junction ชุมทางบ้านไผ่นาบุญ
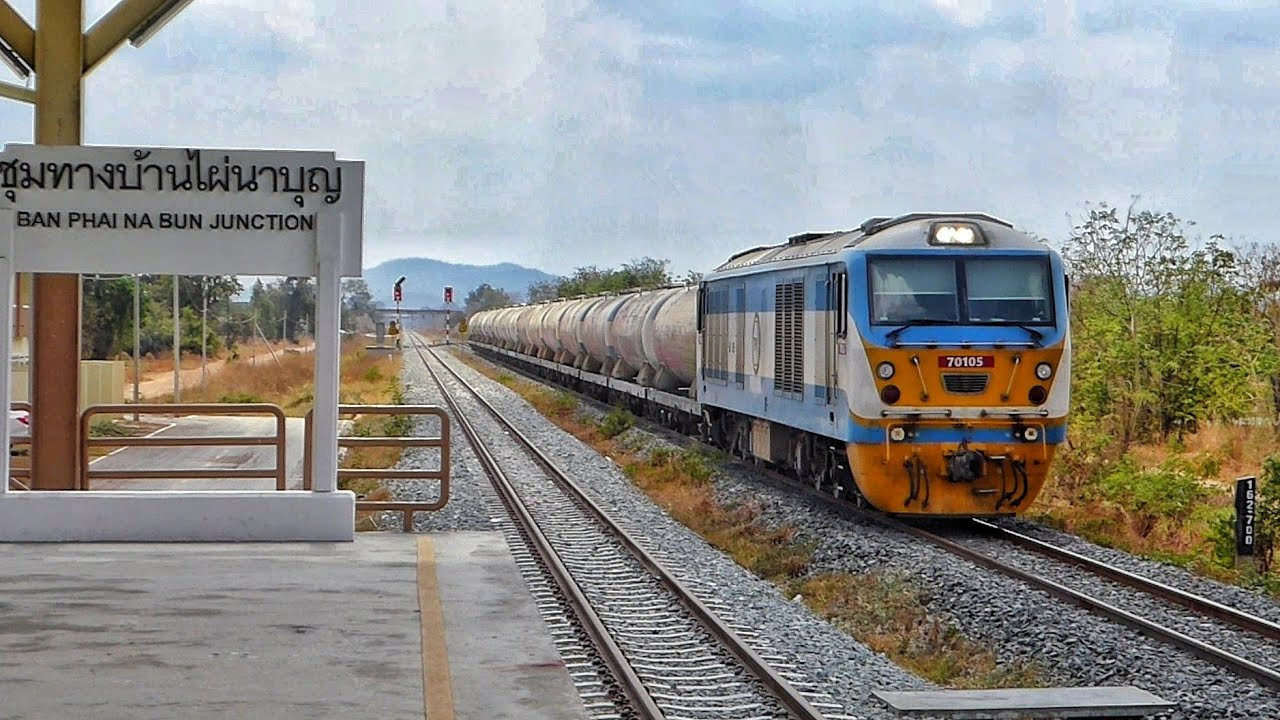

General information
- Location: Mu 4 (Ban Nong Krung), Taling Chan subdistrict, Mueang Saraburi district Saraburi; Thailand
- Coordinates: 14°32′56″N 100°58′59″E
- Operator: State Railway of Thailand
- Manager: Ministry of Transport
- Line: Phra Phutthachai Line
- Platforms: 1
- Tracks: 2

Construction
- Structure type: Concrete building
- Parking: Yes

Other information
- Station code: บญ.
- Classification: Class 3

History
- Opened: 3 February 2020; 6 years ago

Services
Preceding station	State Railway of Thailand	Following station
Bu Yai towards Khlong Sip Kao Junction	Eastern Line Phra Phutthachai Freight Line	Kaeng Khoi Junction Terminus
Location

Ban Phai Na Bun Junction railway station is a railway station located in Taling Chan Subdistrict, Mueang Saraburi district, Saraburi province. It is a class 3 railway station located 162.811 km (101.2 mi) from Bangkok railway station. It opened on February 3, 2020, as part of the double tracking of the Phra Phutthachai Freight Line. It acts as a junction for the newly-constructed chord line connecting the station and Nong Bua Junction. Before this, trains had to switch directions at Kaeng Khoi Junction if they were travelling in the direction of Ban Phachi Junction. As it is a freight-only station, no passenger trains operate at the station.
