= Nong Bua Junction railway station =

Railway station in Thailand

Nong Bua Junction ชุมทางหนองบัว
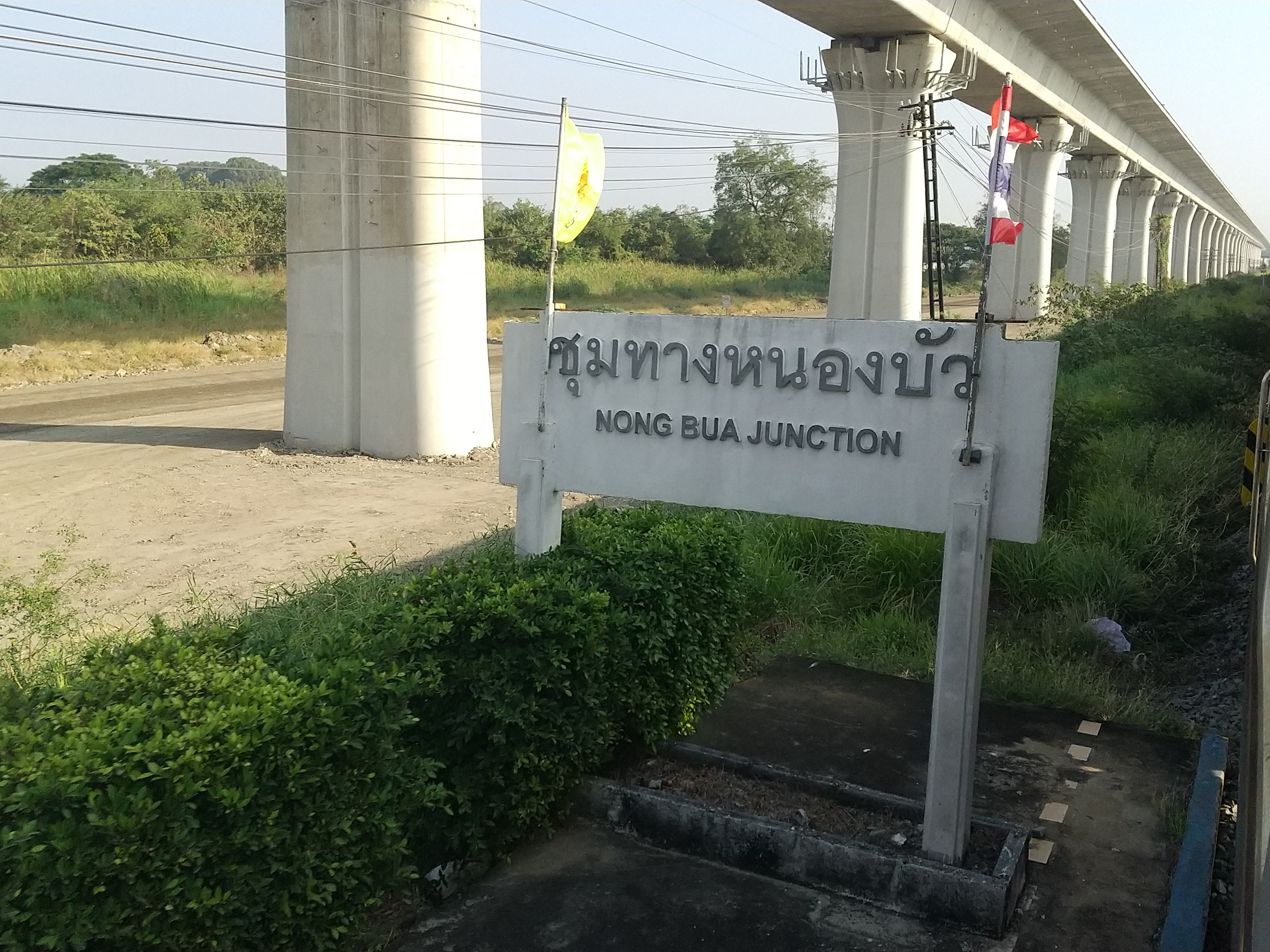
- Signage

General information
- Location: Mu 1 (Ban Tha Yiam), Taling Chan Subdistrict, Saraburi City; Saraburi Province; Thailand
- Coordinates: 14°33′21″N 100°57′46″E
- Operator: State Railway of Thailand
- Manager: Ministry of Transport
- Lines: Ubon Ratchathani Main Line; Phra Phutthachai Line
- Distance: 119.247 km (74.1 mi) from Hua Lamphong
- Platforms: 3
- Tracks: 3

Construction
- Structure type: At-grade

Other information
- Station code: นบ.
- Classification: Class 3

Services
Preceding station	State Railway of Thailand	Following station
Saraburi towards Hua Lamphong or Krung Thep Aphiwat	Northeastern Line	Kaeng Khoi Junction towards Ubon Ratchathani or Khamsavath (Laos)
Ban Phai Na Bun Junction towards Khlong Sip Kao Junction	Eastern Line Phra Phutthachai Freight Line	Kaeng Khoi Junction Terminus
Location

Nong Bua Junction railway station is a railway station located in Taling Chan Subdistrict, Saraburi City, Saraburi. It is a class 3 railway station located 119.247 km (74.1 mi) from Bangkok railway station. It was made a junction with the Eastern Line Phra Phutthachai Freight Branch following the construction of the chord line in 2019 which formed a wye at the original branch point between Nong Bua and Kaeng Khoi Junction.
