= Bang Phra railway station =

Railway station in Chonburi, Thailand

Bang Phra บางพระ
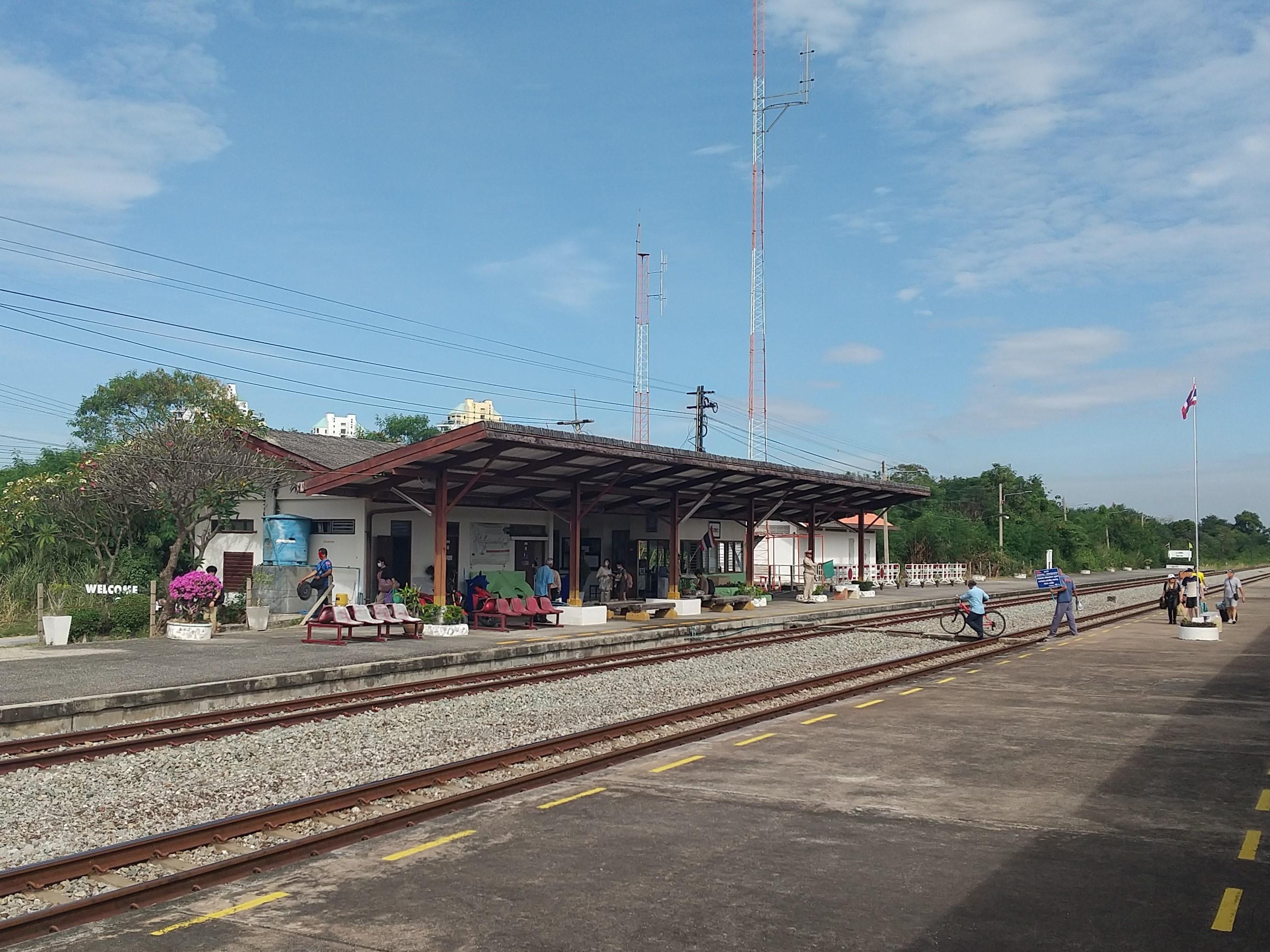

General information
- Location: Bang Phra Subdistrict, Si Racha District; Chonburi Province; Thailand
- Coordinates: 13.2358°N 100.9534°E
- Operator: State Railway of Thailand
- Manager: Ministry of Transport
- Line: Chuk Samet Main Line
- Platforms: 3
- Tracks: 3

Construction
- Structure type: At-grade

Other information
- Station code: ระ.
- Classification: Class 3

History
- Opened: July 1989

Services
Preceding station	State Railway of Thailand	Following station
Chonburi towards Hua Lamphong	Eastern Line	Khao Phrabat Halt towards Chuk Samet
Location

Bang Phra station (Thai: สถานีบางพระ) is a railway station located in Bang Phra Subdistrict, Si Racha District, Chonburi Province. It is a class 3 railway station located 121.31 km (75.4 mi) from Bangkok railway station.
