= Aranyaprathet =

Town in Sa Kaeo Province

Aranyaprathet อรัญญประเทศ
- Town
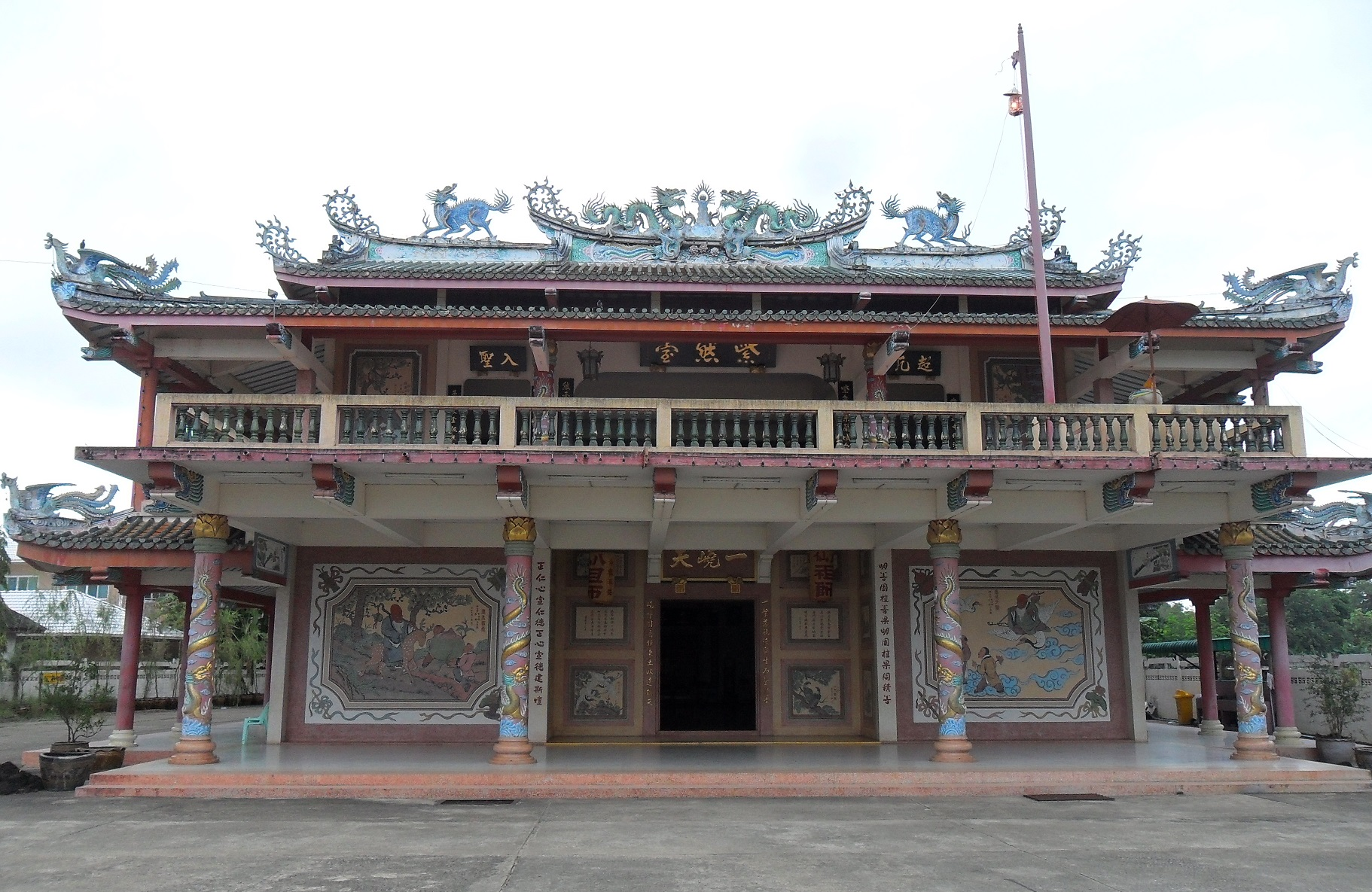
- Chinese Temple on Rat Uthit Rd.

- Location within Thailand
- Coordinates: 13°41′34″N 102°30′6″E
- Country: Thailand
- Provinces: Sa Kaeo province
- District: Aranyaprathet district
- Elevation: 50 m (160 ft)

Population (2005)
  - Total: 16,937
- Time zone: UTC+7 (UTC+7)

Aranyaprathet (Thai: อรัญประเทศ) is a town (thesaban mueang) in Sa Kaeo province in eastern Thailand. It covers the entire tambon of Aranyaprathet, in Aranyaprathet district. As of 2005, the town had 16,937 inhabitants. It is located just 6 kilometres (3.7 mi) from the border with Cambodia; the town of Poipet is on the other side of the border. On the Thai side of the border is the huge Rong Kluea Market. Cambodian people cross the border daily with pushcarts and scooters with sidecars loaded with their products. A significant part of the trade is in second-hand clothes. Just over the border on the Cambodian side there are casinos. These are visited by many Thai people because gambling is prohibited in Thailand. Special free buses run between Bangkok and these casinos. Cambodians themselves are not allowed to gamble in these border casinos.

== Climate ==
Aranyaprathet has a tropical savanna climate (Köppen climate classification Aw). Winters are dry and very warm. Temperatures rise until April, which is very hot, with the average daily maximum at 36.7 °C (98.1 °F). The monsoon season is from late April to October, with heavy rain and somewhat cooler temperatures during the day, although nights remain warm.

Climate data for Aranyaprathet (1991–2020, extremes 1951-present)
Month	Jan	Feb	Mar	Apr	May	Jun	Jul	Aug	Sep	Oct	Nov	Dec	Year
Record high °C (°F)	37.2 (99.0)	39.7 (103.5)	40.7 (105.3)	42.4 (108.3)	42.0 (107.6)	37.9 (100.2)	38.3 (100.9)	36.6 (97.9)	35.9 (96.6)	35.5 (95.9)	36.7 (98.1)	36.2 (97.2)	42.4 (108.3)
Mean daily maximum °C (°F)	32.9 (91.2)	34.8 (94.6)	36.3 (97.3)	36.8 (98.2)	35.6 (96.1)	34.3 (93.7)	33.4 (92.1)	33.1 (91.6)	32.8 (91.0)	32.6 (90.7)	32.4 (90.3)	31.8 (89.2)	33.9 (93.0)
Daily mean °C (°F)	26.6 (79.9)	28.3 (82.9)	29.8 (85.6)	30.3 (86.5)	29.6 (85.3)	28.9 (84.0)	28.4 (83.1)	28.1 (82.6)	27.9 (82.2)	27.8 (82.0)	27.2 (81.0)	26.0 (78.8)	28.2 (82.8)
Mean daily minimum °C (°F)	20.8 (69.4)	22.7 (72.9)	24.7 (76.5)	25.6 (78.1)	25.8 (78.4)	25.4 (77.7)	25.0 (77.0)	24.8 (76.6)	24.7 (76.5)	24.3 (75.7)	22.7 (72.9)	20.8 (69.4)	23.9 (75.1)
Record low °C (°F)	7.6 (45.7)	12.5 (54.5)	13.8 (56.8)	17.3 (63.1)	21.3 (70.3)	22.1 (71.8)	22.0 (71.6)	21.5 (70.7)	21.1 (70.0)	18.3 (64.9)	10.2 (50.4)	10.0 (50.0)	7.6 (45.7)
Average precipitation mm (inches)	10.6 (0.42)	25.2 (0.99)	58.5 (2.30)	92.3 (3.63)	142.6 (5.61)	168.6 (6.64)	175.9 (6.93)	200.6 (7.90)	244.2 (9.61)	169.0 (6.65)	32.2 (1.27)	5.4 (0.21)	1,325.1 (52.17)
Average precipitation days (≥ 1.0 mm)	1.1	1.6	4.3	6.4	11.2	13.6	14.0	15.3	15.2	11.7	3.3	0.9	98.6
Average relative humidity (%)	64.0	63.9	66.7	70.2	76.1	78.9	80.2	81.8	83.0	80.3	72.5	66.3	73.7
Mean monthly sunshine hours	263.5	211.9	238.7	204.0	155.0	153.0	158.1	114.7	108.0	145.7	186.0	226.3	2,164.9
Mean daily sunshine hours	8.5	7.5	7.7	6.8	5.0	5.1	5.1	3.7	3.6	4.7	6.2	7.3	5.9
Source 1: NOAA
Source 2: Office of Water Management and Hydrology, Royal Irrigation Department (sun 1981–2010)(extremes)

== Transportation ==
Aranyaprathet lies on Route 33, part of the route connecting Bangkok and Siem Reap, the city nearest Angkor Wat, and as a result sees a large volume of tourist traffic. The road leads east to the border with Cambodia, and west to Sa Kaeo and Nakhon Nayok. Another road, Route 348, leads north to Nang Rong.

Aranyaprathet also has a railway station for the Eastern Line of the State Railway of Thailand, with a rail link to the Ban Klong Luk Border railway station to Cambodia.
