= Khlong Sip Kao Junction railway station =

Railway station in Yothaka, Thailand

Khlong Sip Kao Junction ชุมทางคลองสิบเก้า
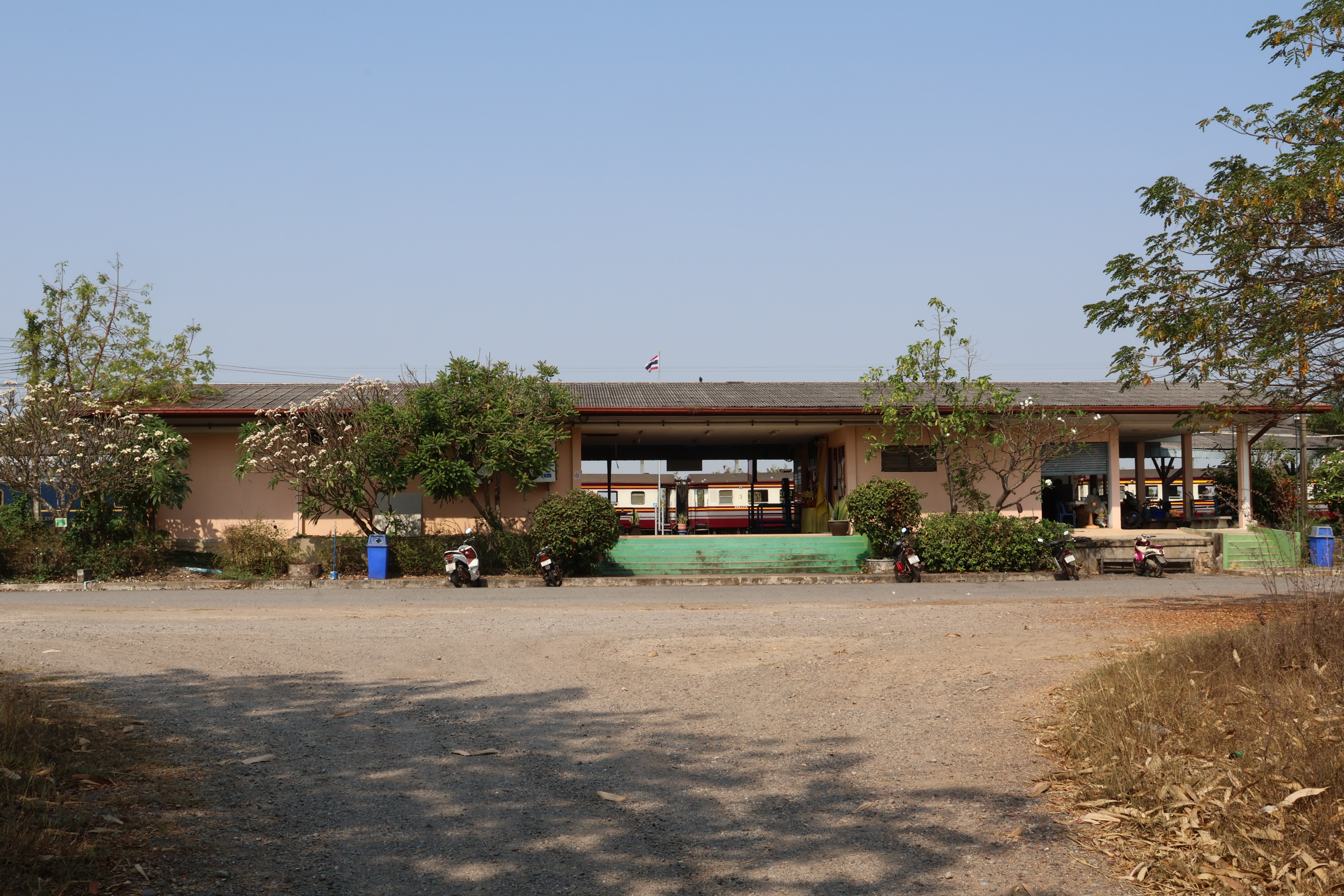

General information
- Location: Yothaka Subdistrict, Bang Nam Priao District; Chachoengsao Province; Thailand
- Coordinates: 13.9072°N 101.1140°E
- Operator: State Railway of Thailand
- Manager: Ministry of Transport
- Lines: Aranyaprathet Main Line; Phra Phutthachai Line
- Platforms: 2
- Tracks: 3

Construction
- Structure type: At-grade

Other information
- Classification: Class 3

History
- Opened: January 1925; 101 years ago (Halt); August 1995; 31 years ago (Junction)

Services
Preceding station	State Railway of Thailand	Following station
Bang Nam Priao towards Hua Lamphong	Eastern Line	Khlong Yi Sip Et Halt towards Poipet (Cambodia)
Terminus	Eastern Line Phra Phutthachai Freight Line	Ongkharak towards Kaeng Khoi Junction
Location

Khlong Sip Kao Junction railway station is a railway station located in Yothaka Subdistrict, Bang Nam Priao District, Chachoengsao, Thailand. The station is a class 3 railway station, and is located 85.6 km (53.2 mi) from Bangkok railway station. Khlong Sip Kao is named after Khlong 19 (Sip Kao is 19 in Thai), which is a man-made irrigation canal, located nearby. It is also the junction for the Eastern Line Aranyaprathet Main Line and the Phra Phutthachai Line for freight trains only to Kaeng Khoi Junction.

Khlong Sip Kao Junction opened in January 1925 as part of the Eastern Line Chachoengsao Junction–Kabin Buri section. It opened as a halt, and eventually became a junction in August 1995, as the Phra Phutthachai Line opened.

== Train services ==
- Ordinary train No. 275/276 Bangkok–Aranyaprathet–Bangkok
- Ordinary train No. 277/278 Bangkok–Kabin Buri–Bangkok
- Ordinary train No. 279/280 Bangkok–Aranyaprathet–Bangkok
- Ordinary train No. 281/282 Bangkok–Kabin Buri–Bangkok
- Ordinary train No. 371/372 Bangkok–Prachin Buri–Bangkok
