= Prasat Kao Noi =

Khmer Hindu temple

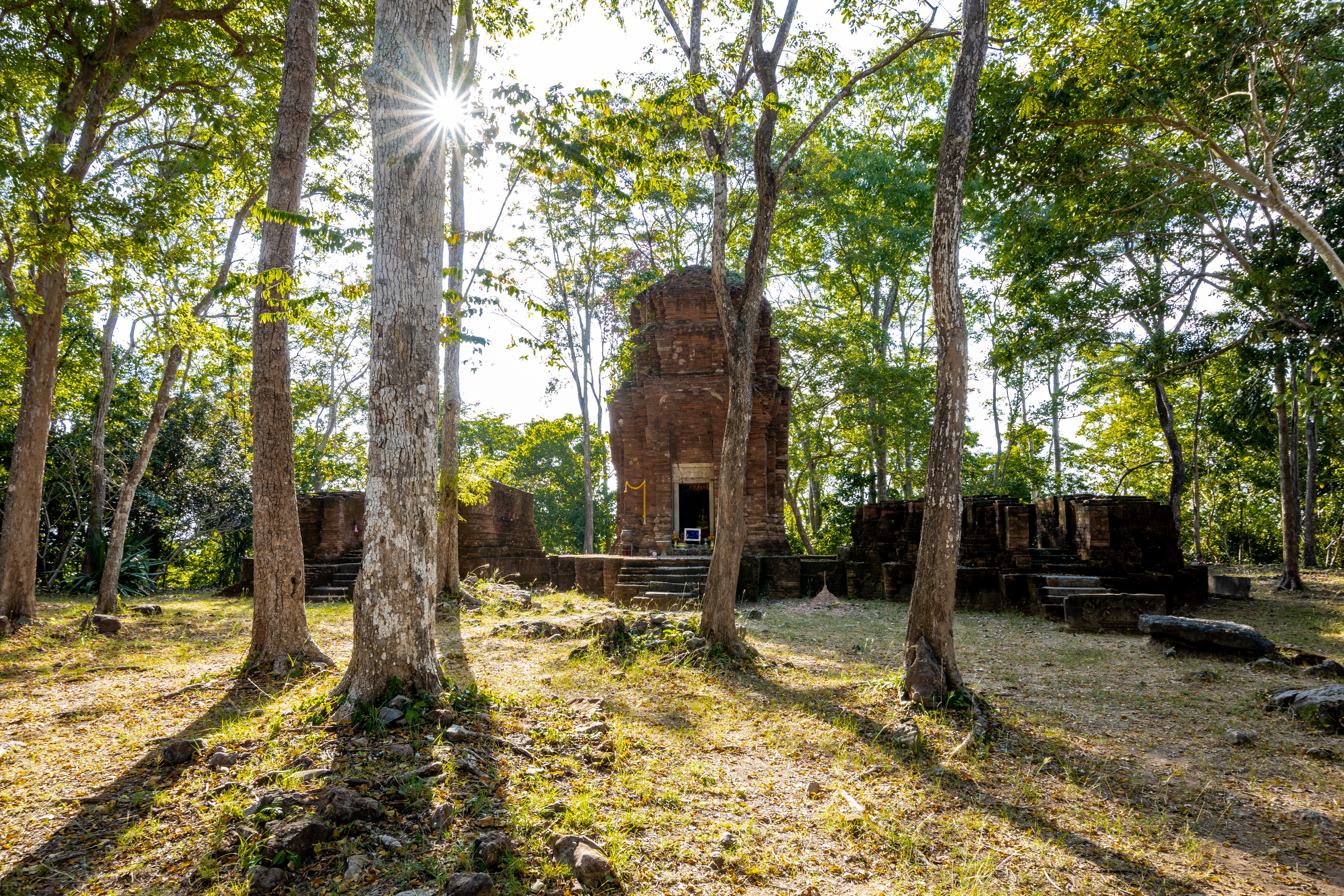

Religion
- Affiliation: Hinduism
- District: Aranyaprathet
- Province: Sa Kaeo
- Deity: Shiva

Location
- Country: Thailand
- Interactive map of Prasat Kao Noi
- Coordinates: 13.583°N 102.525°E

Architecture
- Type: Khmer
- Completed: 7th century

Prasat Kao Noi is an ancient Khmer Hindu temple in Aranyaprathet district, Sa Kaeo province, Thailand. It was built in the 7th century in the Khmer architectural style and is considered to be the earliest Khmer monument of significance in Thailand.

== Description ==
Built during the reign of Isanavarman I or Bhavavarman II in the 7th century in the Khmer architectural style of late Sambor Prei Kuk and early Prei Kmeng, the temple is situated on a hill, which gives the temple its name meaning ("small hill"), near the town of Aranyaprathet.

The temple consists of three towers built in a row, set on a common base, and facing east. The central tower was reconstructed in the 11th century, and has been restored by the Fine Arts Department. Considered the oldest, major Khmer monument in Thailand, dating from the 7th century, this view is based on the study of its lintels. One of its lintels shows makaras disgorging medallions containing an elephant and horses. The two towers on either side are in ruins but the four lintels from the northern tower have been recovered. Although the makaras on these lintels have disappeared, the medallions containing praying figures survive. All the lintels at the site are replicas. The originals are in the Pranchinburi National Museum.

Artefacts recovered from the site including lingas and pedestals were discovered in numerous small pieces suggesting they had been shattered in acts of desecration.
