= Hua Takhe railway station =

Railway station in Thailand

Coordinates: 13.7281°N 100.7822°E

Hua Takhe หัวตะเข้
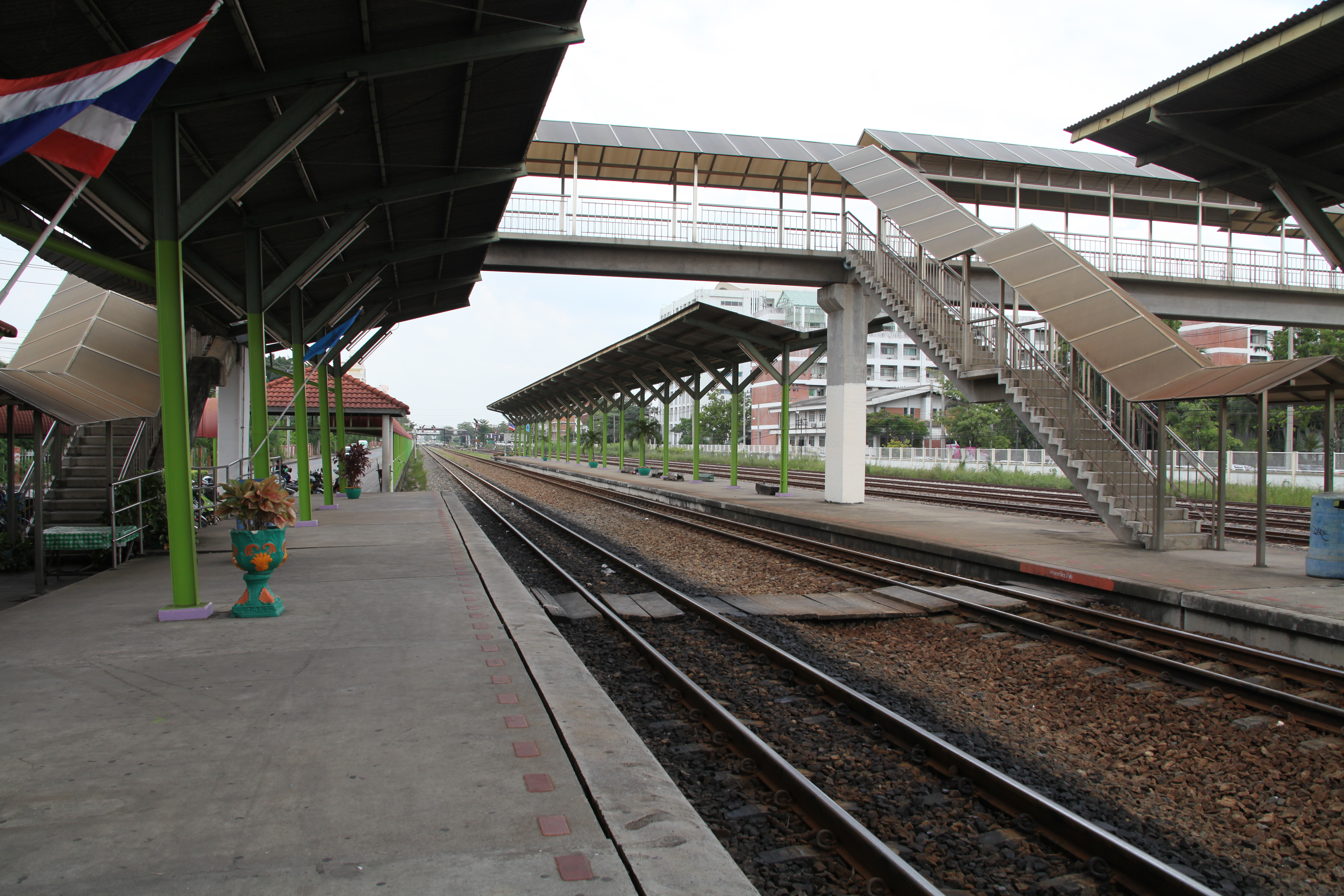

General information
- Location: Lat Krabang Subdistrict, Lat Krabang District, Bangkok
- Owner: State Railway of Thailand
- Line: Eastern Line
- Platforms: 3
- Tracks: 7

Other information
- Station code: หข.

Services
Preceding station	State Railway of Thailand	Following station
Phra Chom Klao towards Hua Lamphong	Eastern Line	Khlong Luang Phaeng towards Chuk Samet or Poipet (Cambodia)
Location

Hua Takhe railway station is a railway station located in Lat Krabang Subdistrict, Lat Krabang District, Bangkok. It is a class 1 railway station located 30.911 km (19.2 mi) from Bangkok railway station. This station is the nearest station to Suvarnabhumi Airport, as well as the nearest large railway station to King Mongkut's Institute of Technology Ladkrabang. However, the nearest railway station to KMITL is Phra Chom Klao halt, located only 830 m (2,723 ft) from Hua Takhe Station. Hua Takhe is also the junction (although not officially one) for the freight-only line to the Lat Krabang Inland Container Depot (ICD).
