= Ban Klong Luk Border railway station =

Railway station in Thailand

Ban Klong Luk Border ด่านพรมแดนบ้านคลองลึก
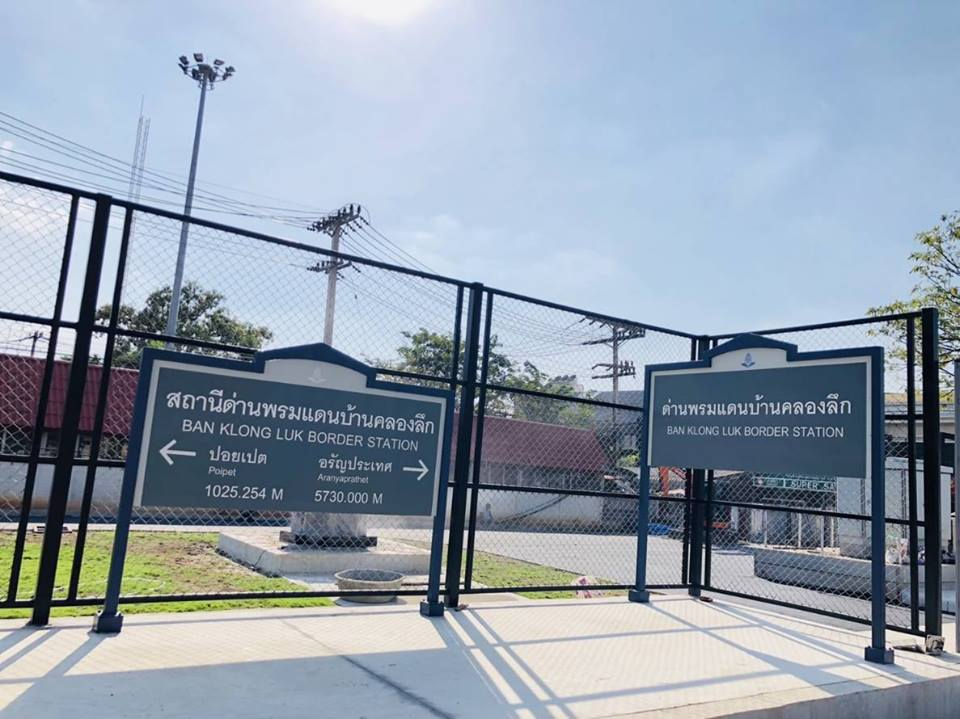

General information
- Location: Aranyaprathet Subdistrict, Aranyaprathet District; Sa Kaeo Province; Thailand
- Coordinates: 13.662753°N 102.548482°E
- Operator: State Railway of Thailand
- Line: Aranyaprathet Main Line
- Platforms: 1
- Tracks: 2

Construction
- Structure type: At-grade
- Parking: Yes

Other information
- Station code: ลง.
- Classification: Class 3

History
- Opened: 22 April 2019; 7 years ago

Services
Preceding station	State Railway of Thailand	Following station
Aranyaprathet towards Hua Lamphong	Eastern Line	Poipet (Cambodia) Terminus
Location

Ban Klong Luk Border railway station (Thai: สถานีรถไฟด่านพรมแดนบ้านคลองลึก) is a railway station in Thailand and is the last stop of the Aranyaprathet Main Line of the Eastern Line located in Thailand, before entering Cambodia. It is located in Aranyaprathet Subdistrict, Aranyaprathet District, Sa Kaeo Province on the border between Thailand and Cambodia.

Ban Klong Luk Border railway station is classified as a third class railway station. It is 260.28 km (161 mi) from Hua Lamphong (Bangkok railway station) and located on the south side of Rong Kluea Market, the largest retail and wholesale second-hand clothing market in eastern Thailand.

This station has a history of more than 40 years. The State Railway of Thailand (SRT) repaired and renovated the tracks from Aranyaprathet railway station, located 6 km (3 mi) away. The official opening ceremony took place on 22 April 2019 and the first rail services were operated on 1 July 2019. Services at the station were temporarily suspended between 2020 and 2021 due to COVID-19, with trains from Bangkok terminating at Aranyaprathet. Cross-border services remain suspended.
