= Aranyaprathet railway station =

Railway station in Thailand

Aranyaprathet อรัญประเทศ
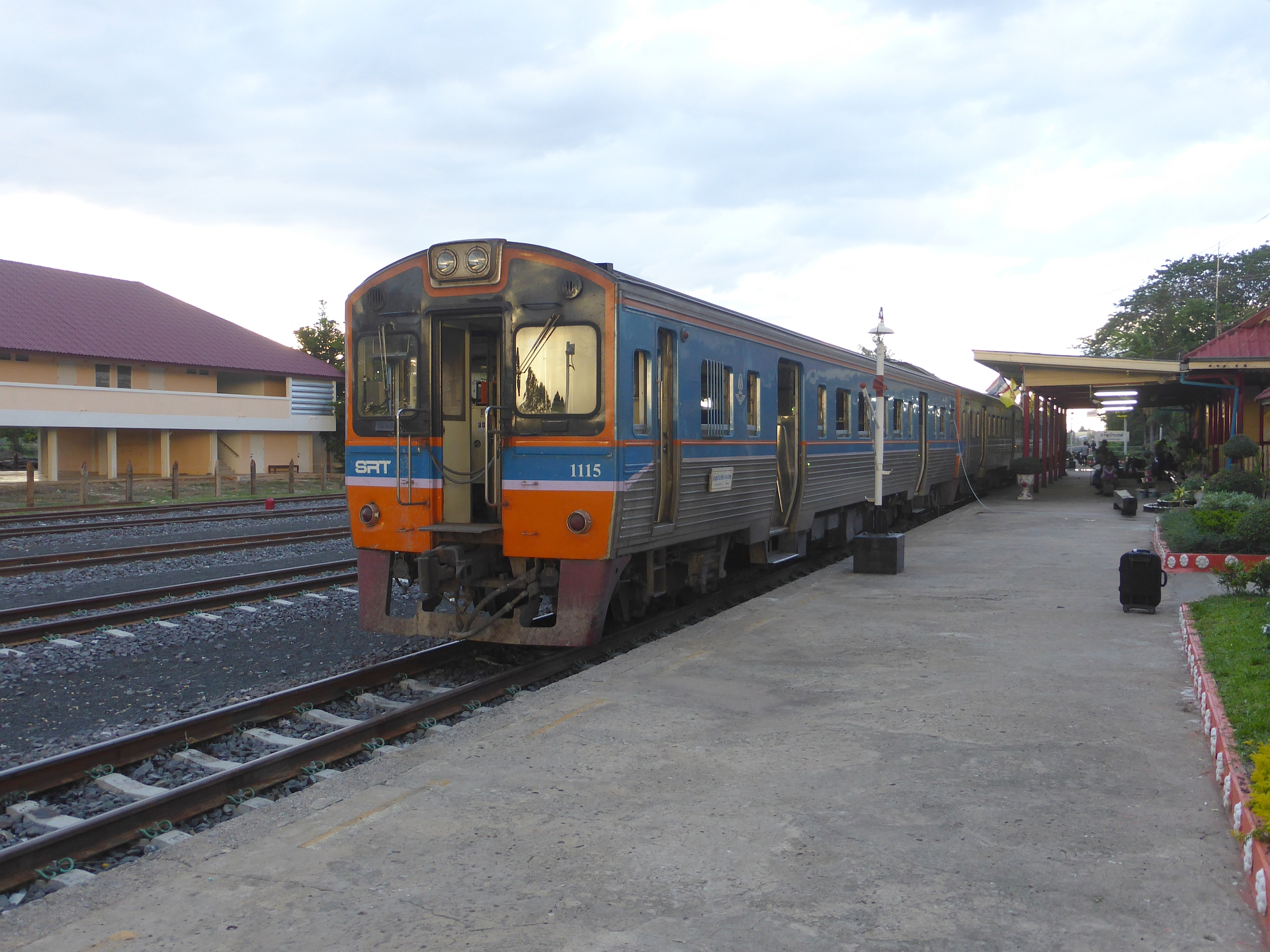

General information
- Location: Aranyaprathet Subdistrict, Aranyaprathet District; Sa Kaeo Province; Thailand
- Coordinates: 13.6926°N 102.5052°E
- Operator: State Railway of Thailand
- Line: Aranyaprathet Main Line
- Distance: 254.5 km (158.1 mi) from Bangkok
- Platforms: 1
- Tracks: 4

Construction
- Structure type: At-grade

Other information
- Station code: อร.
- Classification: Class 1

History
- Opened: 8 November 1926; 99 years ago

Services
Preceding station	State Railway of Thailand	Following station
Huai Dua Halt towards Hua Lamphong	Eastern Line	Ban Klong Luk Border towards Poipet (Cambodia)
Location

Aranyaprathet railway station (Thai: สถานีอรัญประเทศ) is a railway station located in Aranyaprathet Subdistrict, Aranyaprathet District, Sa Kaeo, Thailand. The station is a class 1 railway station located 254.5 km (158.1 mi) from Bangkok railway station. Aranyaprathet Railway Station opened in 8 November 1926 as part of the Eastern Line Kabin Buri–Aranyaprathet section.

There is a rail connection service to the Cambodian border city of Poipet. First opened in 1955, this service has seen closures between 1961–1970 and 1974–2019 due to neglect and poor diplomatic relations, but is back in operation as of April 2019. Services between Aranyaprathet and Ban Khlong Luk Border were temporarily suspended due to the COVID-19 pandemic.

== Cross Border Rail Link ==
Ban Klong Luk Border Station is situated 6 km east of Aranyaprathet station and 1km to the west of the temporary Cambodian Railway terminus at Poipet station. The currently disused 7km rail link crosses the border bridge immediately east of the Thai station. The railway then crosses the national highway to the south side via a roundabout before entering the Cambodian station.
