= Rong Kluea Market =

Coordinates: 13.665242°N 102.544815°E

Rong Kluea Market (Thai: ตลาดโรงเกลือ, lit. 'Salt Warehouse Market'), also known as Klong Luek Market (Thai: ตลาดคลองลึก) is a market in Thailand near the border with Cambodia. It is located in Aranyaprathet District, Sa Kaeo Province 250 kilometers from Bangkok. There are 1380 stores, mostly with goods from the Cambodian side. In this market there are many products such as polished brass, old and new. Porcelain crockery, clothing, cheap electronics, fish baskets, and more.

== History ==
In the past, the border trade market is Khmer (Cambodian) or Poipet market situated opposite the district of Aranyaprathet, Thailand where people know each other well. Poipet market slowed down because of the war in Cambodia in 1975. When the situation calmed down, Poipet was revived again. Meanwhile, the market is shifting, moving across the land border trade to Thailand. The area is sent to the salt storage facility in Cambodia. Local residents sell common salt. The building was a renovated large shopping center and opened on 15 June 1991 by the Management Executive of the province.

== Interesting thing of Rong Kluea Market ==
- Spacious approximately 66 acres of land sheds lined and neatly divided into 40 panels, Each panel has dozens of shops. The market has hundreds of stores. The salt-like atmosphere in a large common market. People crowded the female customers and visitors.
- Aranyaprathet Monument

Locals call this an arch located at the border between the salt immigration on both sides - Thailand, Cambodia. It was built in 1939s to commemorate the event, the Indochina War - the battle between Thailand and France. This event is a continuation of the crisis in 1893, where the Thailand lost some lands to the French.

== Zoning ==
=== Old Rong Kluea Market ===
Focus on Second-hand Product, and Wholesale product.

=== Dayt Thai Market ===
Most of products are shoes, fashion, military even old and new one or fix.

=== New Rong Kluea Market ===
Selling fashion bag, handbag, and other

=== Golden Gate Market ===
Mixing product and retail shop.

=== Bayn-ja wan Market ===
Full of new products with factory price, such as bag, cloth and shoes.

== Transportation ==
From the city of Aranyaprathet, Take highway 33 to the border about 5.5 km. through the police station, Before the intersection, turn left about 200 metres into the market, the market is on the right and left hand.
