= Kabin Buri railway station =

Railway station in Kabin, Thailand

Coordinates: 13.9898°N 101.7228°E

Kabin Buri กบินทร์บุรี
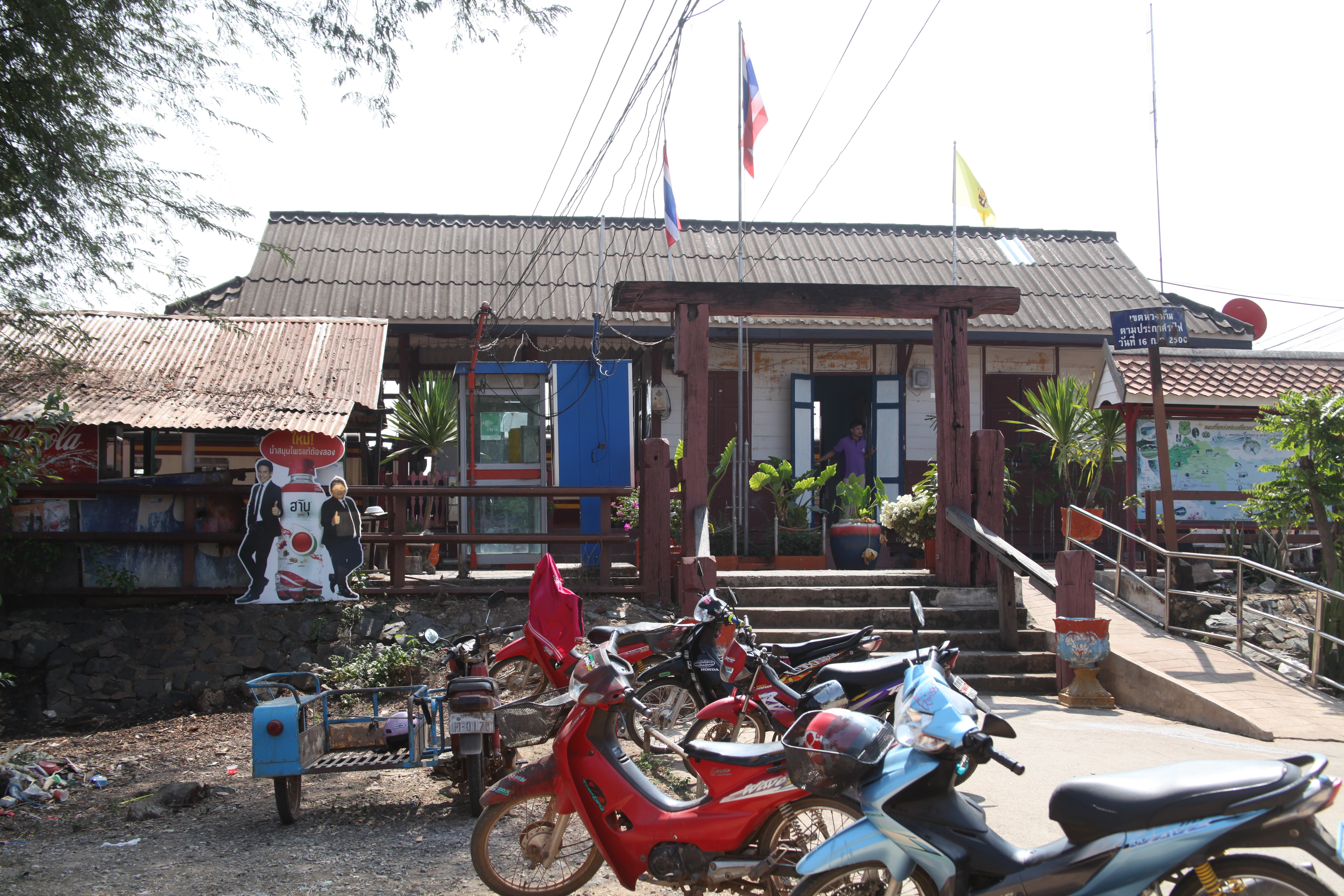
- Kabin Buri Station

General information
- Location: Kabin Subdistrict, Kabin Buri District, Prachinburi
- Owner: State Railway of Thailand
- Line: Eastern Line
- Platforms: 1
- Tracks: 4

Other information
- Station code: กบ.

History
- Opened: January 1925

Services
Preceding station	State Railway of Thailand	Following station
Ban Ko Daeng Halt towards Hua Lamphong	Eastern Line	Kabin Kao Halt towards Poipet (Cambodia)
Location

Kabin Buri railway station is a railway station in Kabin Subdistrict, Kabin Buri District, Prachinburi, Thailand. A class 2 railway station owned by Thailand's state railway, it is 161.260 km (100.2 mi) from the Bangkok railway station. Kabin Buri Station opened in January 1925 as part of the Eastern Line Chachoengsao Junction-Kabin Buri section. In November 1926, the line extended to Aranyaprathet. There was once a railway turntable on site, but it has been converted into a park.
