= Aranyaprathet district =

Aranyaprathet อรัญประเทศ
- District
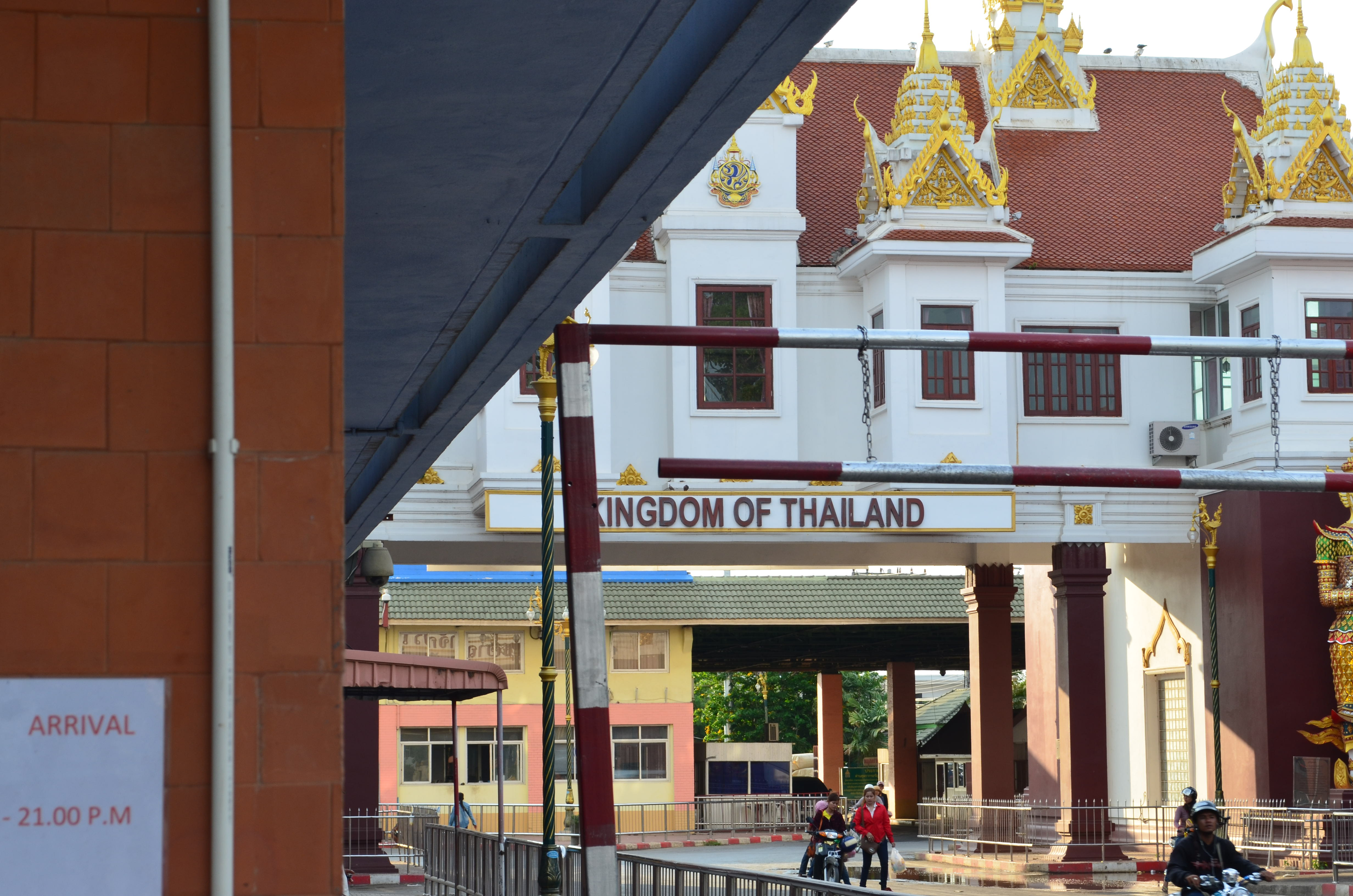
- Boundary at Aranyaprathet

- District location in Sa Kaeo province
- Coordinates: 13°42′3″N 102°30′42″E
- Country: Thailand
- Province: Sa Kaeo
- Seat: Ban Mai Nong Sai

Area
  - Total: 821.265 km^{2} (317.092 sq mi)

Population (2024)
  - Total: 93,451
  - Density: 101.3/km^{2} (262/sq mi)
- Time zone: UTC+7 (ICT)
- Geocode: 2706

Aranyaprathet (Thai: อรัญประเทศ, pronounced [ʔā.rān.já.prā.tʰêːt]) is a district (amphoe) in Sa Kaeo province in Thailand. It borders Cambodia to the east and the busiest border crossing between Cambodia and Thailand is located in this district. The largest town in the district is also called Aranyaprathet.

== History ==
The ancient town of Mueang Phai, which gives its name to one of the district's subdistricts, is one of four central towns in a survey of fifteen moated sites of eastern Thailand by Patcharaporn Ngernkerd and colleagues, measuring 1.28 km² within its moat. A temple, Prasat Muang Phai, stands inside the moat, and the town lies at the eastern end of the overland route their least-cost analysis reconstructs from Si Mahosot in Prachin Buri. Dvaravati material, including a dharmachakra and Buddhist sculpture, has been reported from the district. Prasat Kao Noi in the same district yielded the inscription K. 506 of 637. Paul Lavy and Wesley Clarke hold that the ground around that hill, together with Mueang Phai, probably corresponds to the polity the inscriptions call Jyeṣṭhapura.

In modern times Aranyaprathet was a district of Kabin Buri Province. On 1 April 1926 the province was abolished and the two districts Mueang Kabin Buri and Aranyapathet became districts of Prachinburi province. In 1993 it was one of the districts that formed the new Sa Kaeo province.

== Economy ==
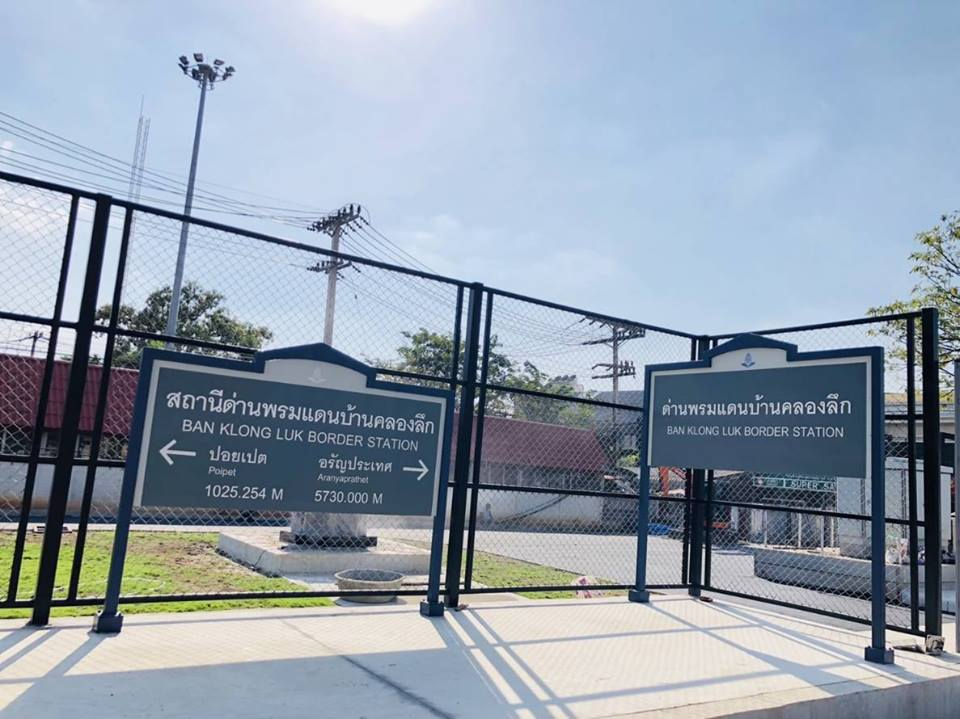
Border (railway) station Ban Klong Luk

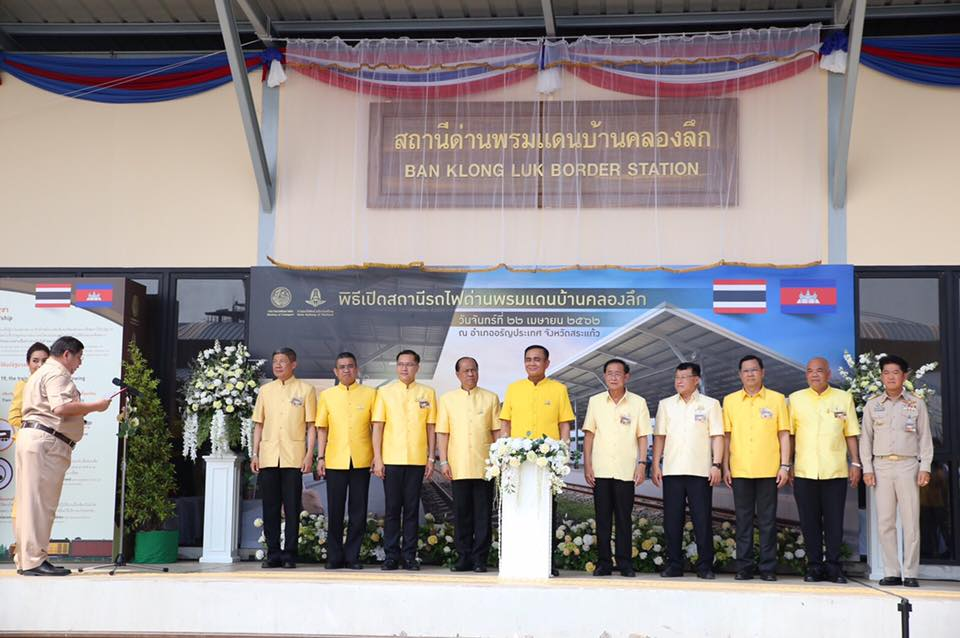
Opening of border station (2019)

Until the Khmer Rouge disrupted neighbouring Cambodia in 1975, Aranyaprathet was a stop on the railroad connecting Bangkok with the Cambodian capital Phnom Penh. Aranyaprathet maintains its rail link with Bangkok but Poipet, the neighbouring Cambodian town, has still yet to see any rail activity since the Khmer Rouge destroyed the track.

Six kilometres southeast of Aranyaprathet town, at Ban Klong Luk (also spelled Ban Khlong Luek), is the busiest border crossing between Cambodia and Thailand. In addition to being on a major trade route, the border sees much tourist activity as it is on the road between Bangkok and Siem Reap, the town nearest Angkor Wat.

Aran, as the town is known in Thailand, has been affected by the growth of the gambling industry in Poipet. Despite gambling being illegal in both Thailand and Cambodia, the Cambodian government has granted concessions for casinos to be built at many of its land crossings. Cambodians are not permitted to gamble in the casinos. Poipet's proximity to Bangkok (3-5 hrs by road) has made it the most popular of these border casino areas. It now hosts seven casinos.

== Administration ==
Aranyaprathet is divided into 13 sub-districts (tambons), which are further subdivided into 114 administrative villages (mubans).

No.	Name	Thai	Villages	Pop.
1.	Aranyaprathet	อรัญประเทศ	-	16,211
2.	Mueang Phai	เมืองไผ่	8	4,307
3.	Han Sai	หันทราย	10	5,644
4.	Khlong Nam Sai	คลองน้ำใส	12	5,432
5.	Tha Kham	ท่าข้าม	11	4,845
6.	Pa Rai	ป่าไร่	9	6,338
7.	Thap Phrik	ทับพริก	7	3,658
8.	Ban Mai Nong Sai	บ้านใหม่หนองไทร	8	9,634
9.	Phan Suek	ผ่านศึก	13	6,592
10.	Nong Sang	หนองสังข์	8	7,009
11.	Khlong Thap Chan	คลองทับจันทร์	10	4,713
12.	Fak Huai	ฟากห้วย	11	6,940
13.	Ban Dan	บ้านด่าน	7	4,780

== Stadium ==
Aranyaprathet District Stadium
- Interactive map of Aranyaprathet District Stadium
- Location: Aranyaprathet, Sa Kaeo, Thailand
- Coordinates: 13°41′46″N 102°30′36″E
- Surface: Grass

Tenant
- Sa Kaeo F.C. 2010

Aranyaprathet District Stadium (Thai: สนามกีฬาอำเภออรัญประเทศ สวนกาญจนาภิเษก) is a multi-purpose stadium used mostly for football matches and was the home stadium of Sa Kaeo F.C.

== Notable people ==
- Kwanchai Fuangprakob: Footballer.
- Tara Tipa: Model and actor.
- Phloen Phromdaen: Luk Thung singer, 2012 National Artist winner.
