= Chachoengsao Junction railway station =

Railway station in Na Mueang, Thailand

Coordinates: 13°41′44″N 101°03′28″E

Chachoengsao Junction ชุมทางฉะเชิงเทรา
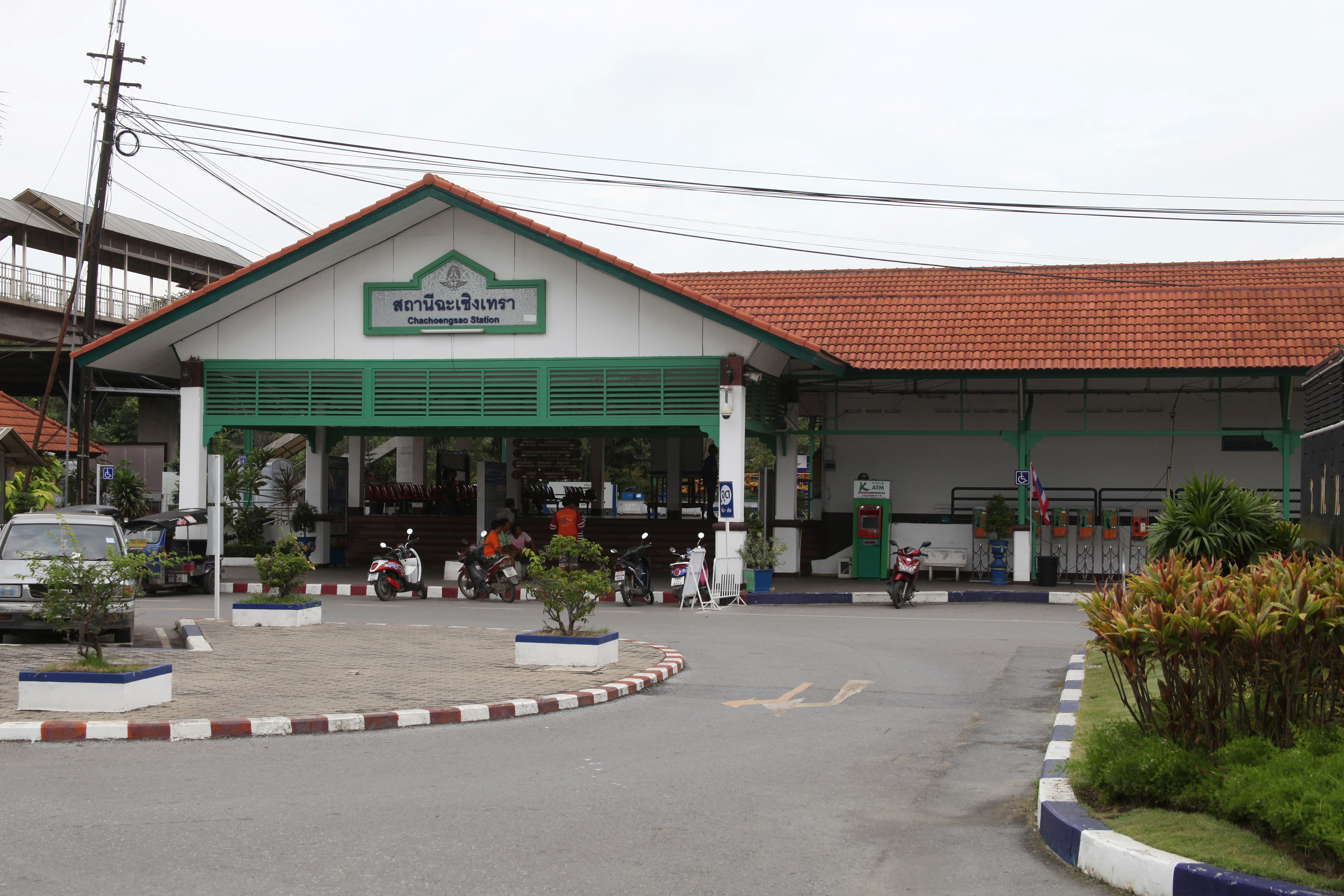

General information
- Location: Na Mueang Subdistrict, Mueang Chachoengsao District; Chachoengsao Province; Thailand
- Operator: State Railway of Thailand
- Manager: Ministry of Transport
- Lines: Aranyaprathet Main Line; Chuk Samet Main Line
- Distance: 70 km (43.5 mi) from Hua Lamphong
- Platforms: 2
- Tracks: 9

Construction
- Structure type: At-grade
- Parking: Yes

Other information
- Station code: ฉท.
- Classification: Class 1

History
- Opened: 27 January 1907
- Rebuilt: 1953
- Former names: Paet Riu

Services
Preceding station	State Railway of Thailand	Following station
Bang Toei Halt towards Hua Lamphong	Eastern Line	Phrong Akat Halt towards Poipet (Cambodia)
Bang Toei Halt towards Hua Lamphong	Eastern Line	Paet Riu Halt towards Chuk Samet
Location

Chachoengsao Junction station (Thai: สถานีชุมทางฉะเชิงเทรา, RTGS: Sathani Chumthang Chachoengsao) is a railway station in eastern Thailand on the State Railway of Thailand's Eastern Line. It is located in Na Mueang Sub-district, Mueang Chachoengsao District, Chachoengsao Province. Its former name was Paet Riu. The station is a class 1 railway station 70 km (43.5 mi) from Bangkok railway station.
