= Eastern Line (Thailand) =

Railway line in Thailand

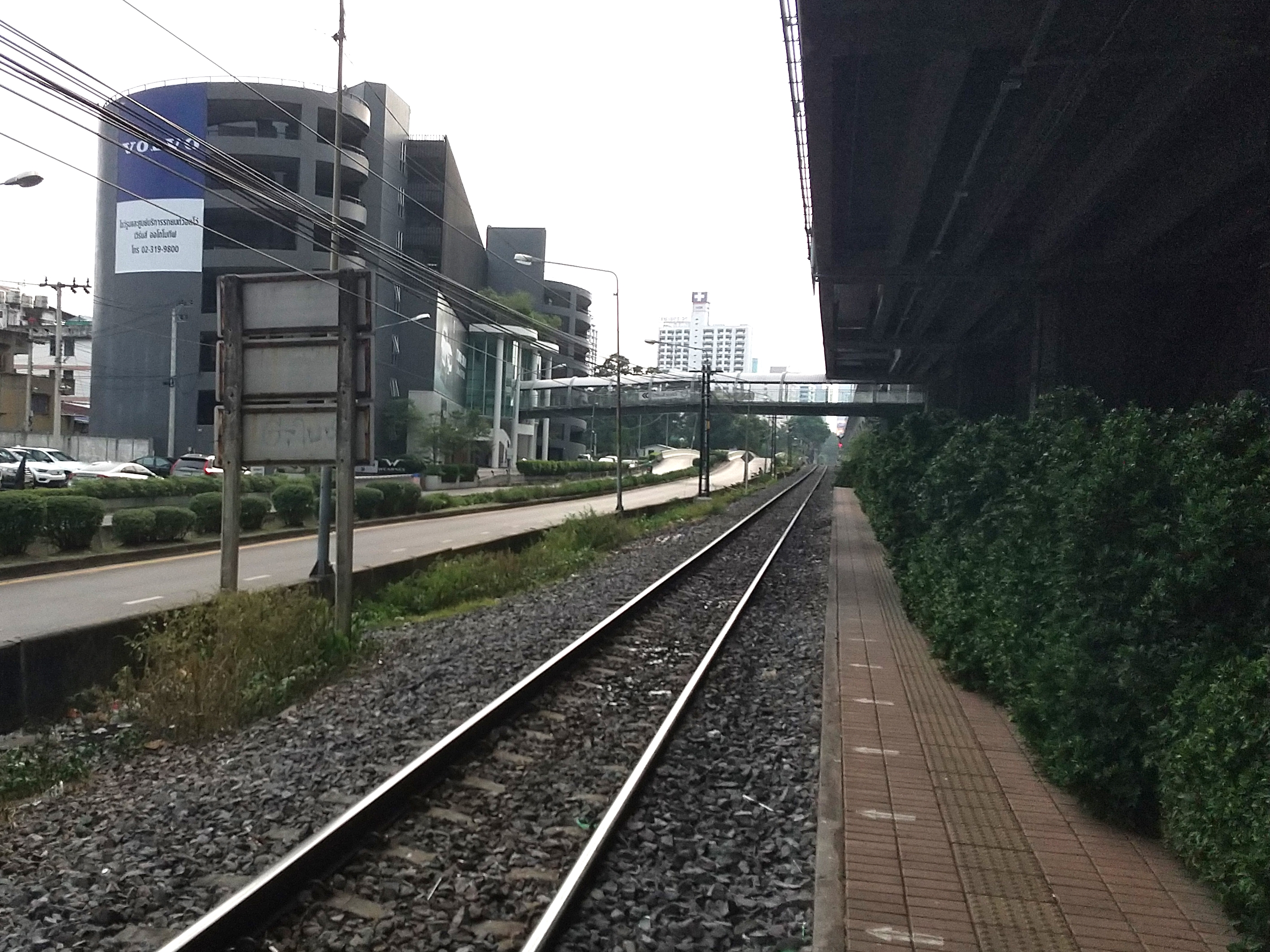
- Aranyaprathet Main Line near Sukhumvit 71 in Suan Luang district, Bangkok

Overview
- Status: Operational
- Owner: Government of Thailand
- Locale: Central and Eastern Thailand
- Termini: Bangkok (Hua Lamphong); Chuk Samet; Kaeng Khoi Junction; Poipet (Cambodia)
- Connecting lines: Aranyaprathet Main Line; Chuk Samet Main Line; Phra Phutthachai Line

Service
- Type: Inter-city rail; Regional rail; Commuter rail; Freight rail
- Operator(s): State Railway of Thailand
- Depot(s): Makkasan; Siracha

History
- Opened: 24 January 1907; 118 years ago
- Last extension: 10 November 2023; 23 months ago
- Completed: 14 July 1989; 36 years ago

Technical
- Line length: 255 km (158 mi)
- Number of tracks: 1
- Track gauge: 1,000 mm (3 ft 3 3/8 in) metre gauge

Eastern Line (Thai: ทางรถไฟสายตะวันออก) is a railway line in Thailand, built and owned by State Railway of Thailand (SRT), located in Bangkok, Chachoengsao Province, Nakhon Nayok Province, Saraburi Province, Prachinburi Province, Sa Kaeo Province, Chonburi Province, and Rayong Province. It is the most important freight transport line in Thailand because there are many freight trains on the line. It was opened on 24 January 1907.

There are plans to incorporate the line as part of the eastern branch line on the Kunming–Singapore railway.

== Route description ==
The lines are divided into three main lines:

- Aranyaprathet Main Line: from Bangkok to Aranyaprathet, Sa Kaeo Province (with an extension to Poipet, Cambodia)
- Chuk Samet Main Line: from Bangkok to Sattahip District, Chonburi Province, there is only one passenger train per day.
- Phra Phutthachai Line: shortcut linking Eastern Line and the Northeastern Line (Thailand), there are only freight trains on this line, and there is one tunnel, Phra Phutthachai Tunnel.

Other branch lines:

- Makkasan – Mae Nam – Bang Chak Oil Refinery
- Lat Krabang – Inland Container Deport (ICD)
- Si Racha Junction – Laem Chabang Port
- Khao Chi Chan Junction – Map Ta Phut Port

== Timeline ==
- 24 January 1907: Hua Lamphong – Chachoengsao Junction
- 1 January 1924: Chachoengsao Junction – Kabin Buri
- 8 November 1926: Kabin Buri – Aranyaprathet
- 14 July 1989: Chachoengsao Junction – Sattahip Commercial Port
- 22 April 2019: Aranyaprathet – Ban Klong Luk – Poipet (Cambodia)
- 10 November 2023 : Ban Phlu Ta Luang – Chuk Samet (reopening of line)

=== Aranyaprathet Main Line ===
In 1941, SRT built a 17-kilometer railway line into Cambodia, but five years later, that line was removed because of World War II ending. In 1953, the SRT rebuilt the 6-kilometer rail line into Cambodia upon Cambodia's request and opened it on 22 April 1955, though it was closed again in 1961 due to strained Cambodia-Thailand relations. The cross-border link between Aranyaprathet Poipet briefly opened in April 2019, but closed again in April 2020 due to the COVID-19 pandemic. In 2023, the border was reopened for freight transport.

=== Chuk Samet Main Line ===
In July 1989, the Eastern Line Chachoengsao Junction–Sattahip Commercial Port section opened. Freight trains continued to end of the line to Sattahip Commercial Port (Chuk Samet) until the early 2000s when the port's commercial role decreased. This resulted in passenger services terminating at Ban Phlu Ta Luang railway station and freight trains stopped operating on the line entirely. In 2002–2003, some services continued down the line to Jamboree Station, built specially for the 20th World Scout Jamboree held in Sattahip. In the 2010s, Samae San railway halt was constructed with some weekend tourist rail services terminating here, but this was short-lived.

On 10 November 2023, the line between Ban Phlu Ta Luang and Chuk Samet reopened, in the hopes of boosting tourism by providing closer access to U-Tapao International Airport, as well as direct rail access to HTMS Chakri Naruebet located at Sattahip Naval Base.

== Notable railway stations ==
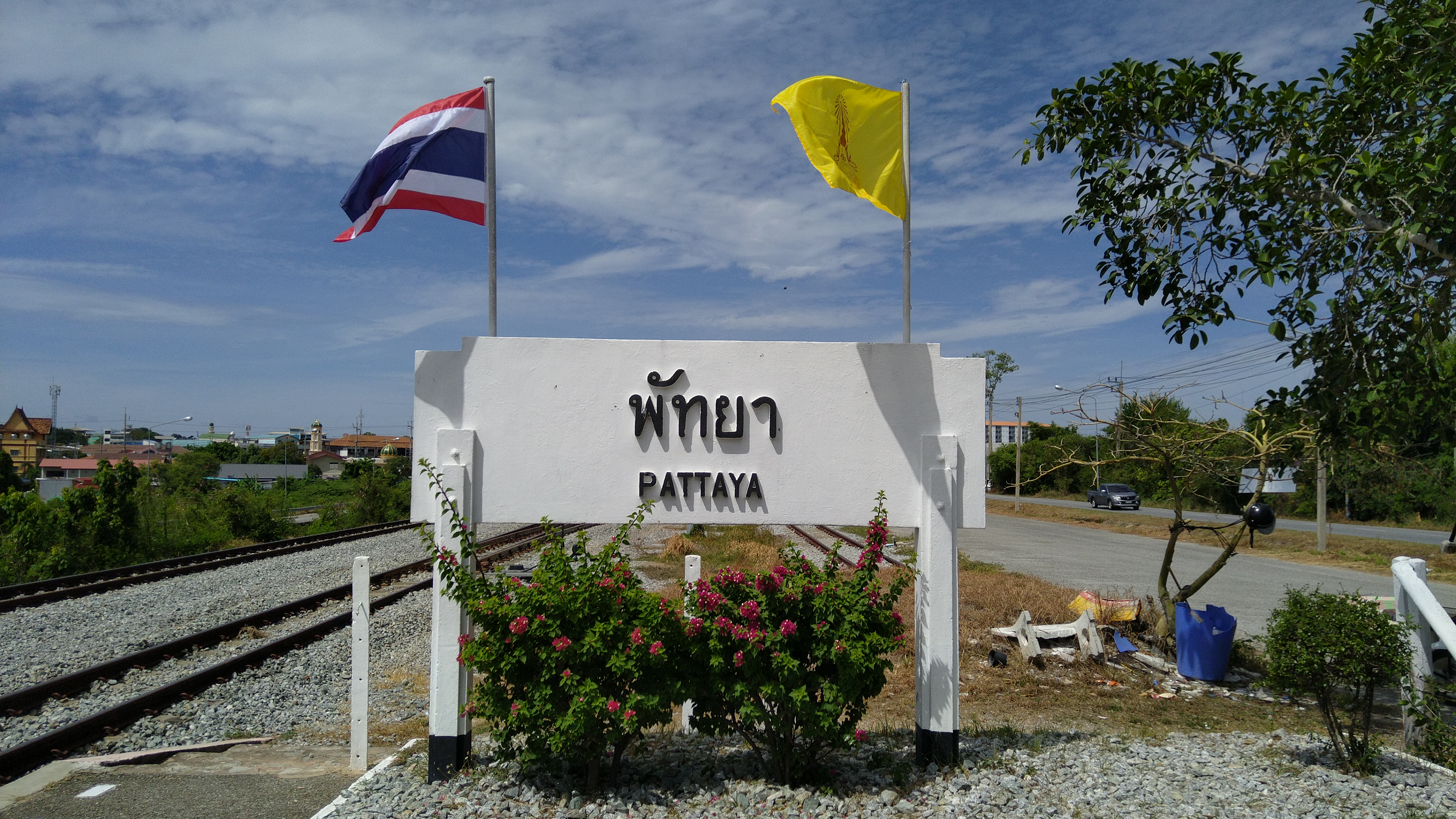
Nameboard of Pattaya station, in July 2023.

The Eastern Line begins at Bangkok before heading through Chachoengsao, Prachinburi to terminate at Aranyaprathet in Sa Kaew Province, 255 kilometers from Bangkok. There is a reopened rail link to Cambodia from Aranyaprathet. A branch line also connects Khlong Sip Kao Junction to the Northeastern Line at Kaeng Khoi Junction. At Chachoengsao Junction, there is another branch to Sattahip. Along the route to Sattahip, at Si Racha Junction, there is yet another branch towards Laem Chabang Deep Sea Port and further at Khao Chi Chan Junction for Map Ta Phut Port, in Rayong.

- Makkasan station - the main depot of SRT (Makkasan Works)
- Hua Mak station - Bangkok suburban station
- Hua Takhe station - Junction for ICD.
- Chachoengsao Junction - Junction for Laem Chabang (double track opened January 2012) and Aranyaprathet Line. Main Chachoengsao station.
- Khlong Sip Kao Junction - Junction for the Aranyaprathet Line and the Cargo Link to Kaeng Khoi Junction.
- Prachin Buri station - Main Prachin Buri Province Rail Station.
- Kabin Buri station - Half of long-distance Aranyaprathet Line services terminate here. In Prachin Buri Province.
- Sa Kaeo station - Main Sa Kaeo station
- Ban Klong Luk Border station - Terminus of Aranyaprathet Main Line, located at the Thai-Cambodian border. (only freight trains cross the border).
- Chonburi station- Main Chonburi station
- Si Racha Junction - Junction for Laem Chabang Deep Sea Port.
- Pattaya station - Railway station for Pattaya City.
- Khao Chi Chan Junction- Junction for Sattahip Commercial Port and Map Taphut Freight Line
- Ban Phlu Ta Luang station - Former terminus for Sattahip.
- U Taphao station - One of railway stations for Sattahip. Serves U-Tapao International Airport.
- Chuk Samet station - Terminus for current, operational, ordinary train from Hua Lumphong.
- Map Ta Phut station - Terminus of East Coast Line - freight trains only.

== See also ==
- Northern Line (Thailand)
- Northeastern Line (Thailand)
- Southern Line (Thailand)
- Airport Rail Link (Bangkok)
- Don Mueang–Suvarnabhumi–U-Tapao high-speed railway
