= Chuk Samet railway station =

Railway station in Chonburi, Thailand

Chuk Samet จุกเสม็ด
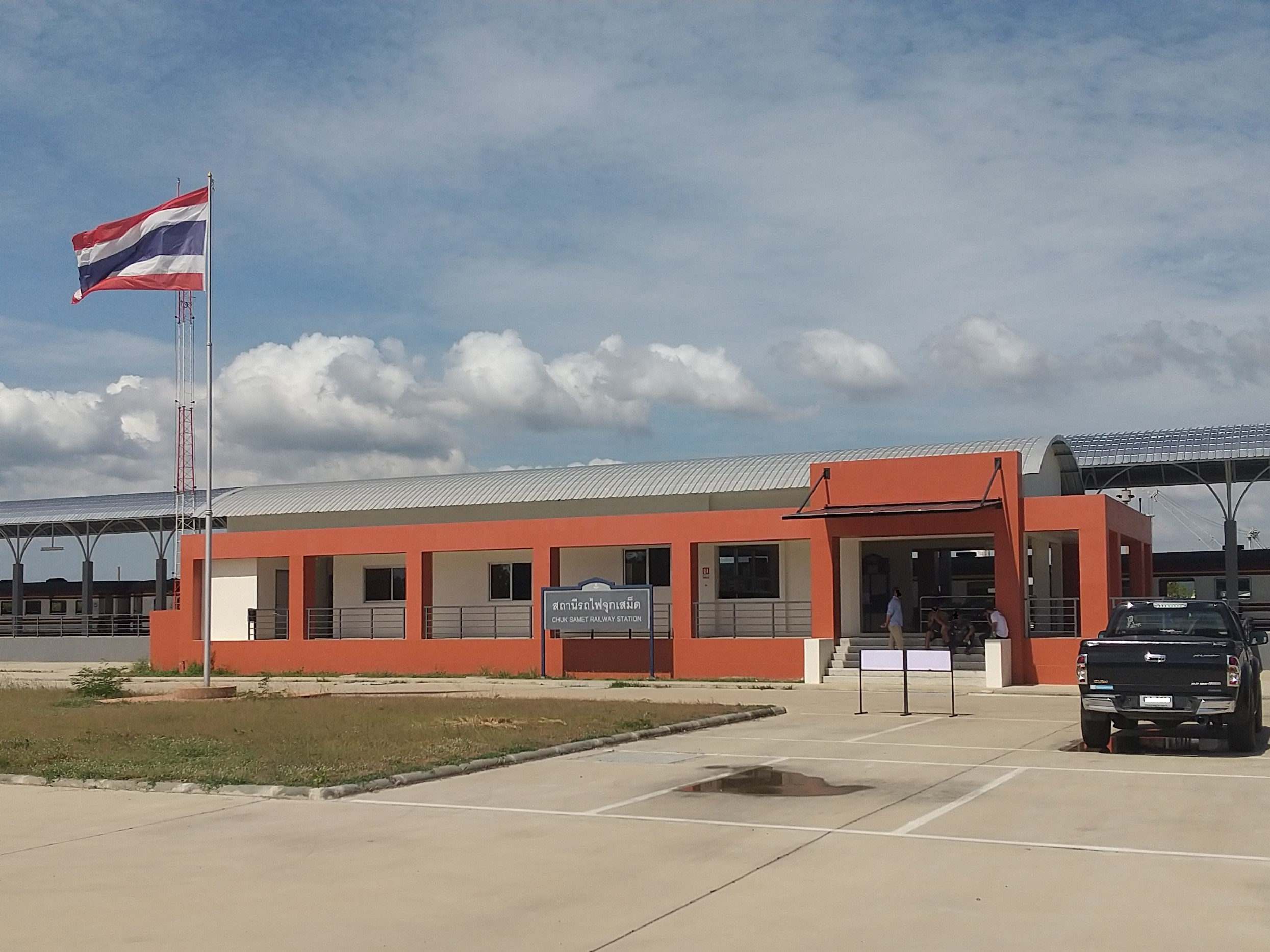

General information
- Location: Sattahip Subdistrict, Sattahip District; Chon Buri Province; Thailand
- Coordinates: 12.6247°N 100.9216°E
- Operator: State Railway of Thailand
- Manager: Ministry of Transport
- Line: Chuk Samet Main Line
- Platforms: 1
- Tracks: 2

Construction
- Structure type: At-grade

Other information
- Station code: จเ.
- Classification: Class 1

History
- Opened: 10 November 2023
- Former names: Sattahip Commercial Port

Services
Preceding station	State Railway of Thailand	Following station
U Taphao towards Hua Lamphong	Eastern Line	Terminus
Location

Chuk Samet railway station is a railway station located in Sattahip Subdistrict, Sattahip District, Chon Buri. It is a class 1 railway station located 195.00 km from Bangkok (Hua Lamphong) railway station. It is the railway station closest to Sattahip town and serves Sattahip Naval Base, including HTMS Chakri Naruebet.

== Background ==
The railway section initially opened in July 1989 as part of the Eastern Line Chachoengsao Junction–Sattahip Commercial Port section, with the terminal rail yard opening as "Sattahip Commercial Port". In the past, only freight trains ran here until the role of Sattahip as a commercial port was decreased and railway operations ceased. This resulted in passenger trains terminating at Ban Phlu Ta Luang station and freight trains disusing the line altogether. The railway section reopened on 10 November 2023, with a new railway station rebuilt at the site of the former Sattahip Commercial Port rail yard and renamed "Chuk Samet".
