= Poipet railway station =

Railway station in Poipet, Cambodia

Poipet ប៉ោយប៉ែត
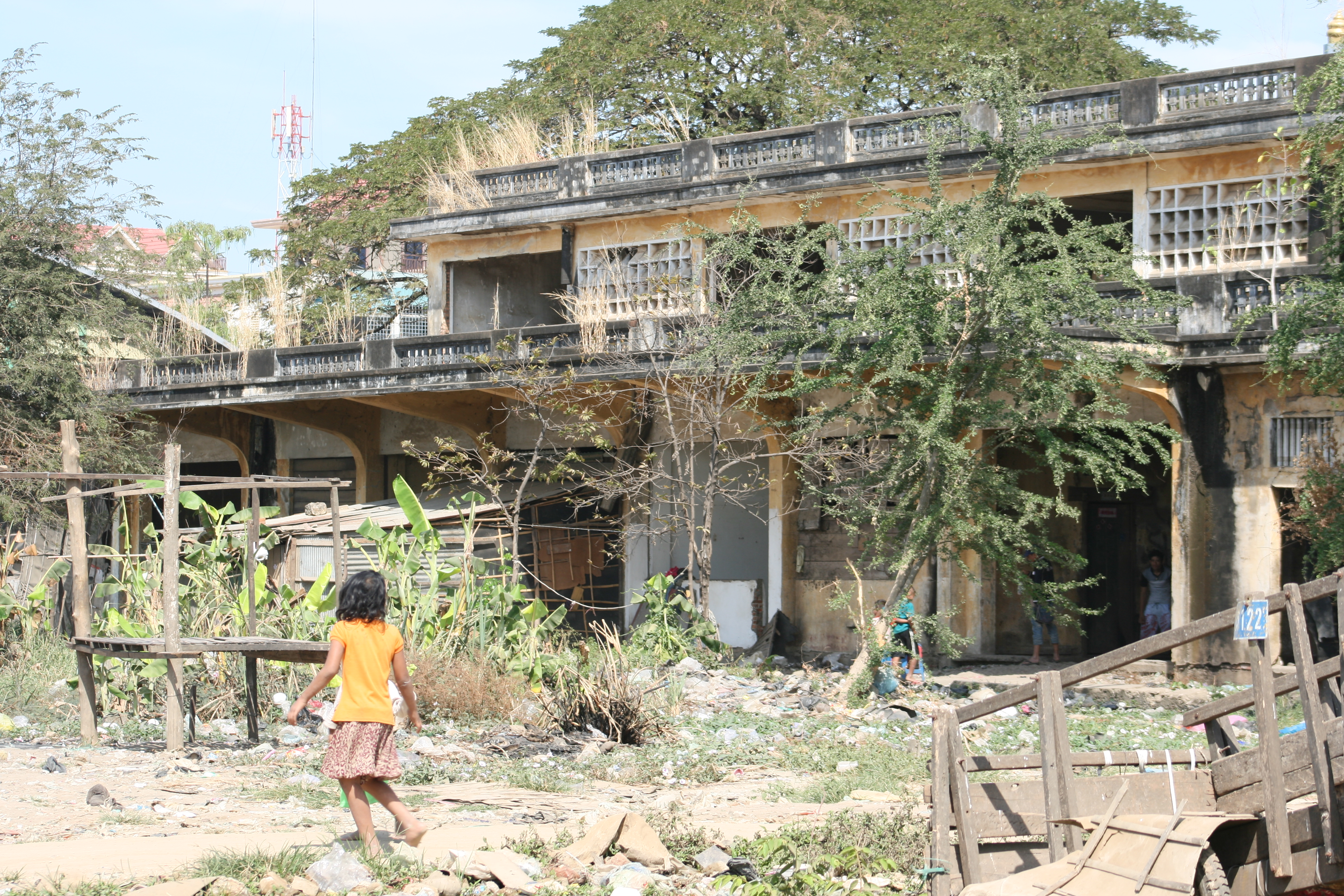
- Poipet railway station in 2012

General information
- Location: 5, Krong Poi Pet; Banteay Meanchey Province; Cambodia
- Coordinates: 13.6573°N 102.5561°E
- Operator: Royal Railways of Cambodia
- Line: Phnom Penh–Poipet Line
- Platforms: 1
- Tracks: 3

Construction
- Structure type: At-grade
- Parking: Yes

History
- Opened: 1942; 84 years ago

Services
Preceding station	Royal Railways	Following station
Terminus	Northern Line	Serei Sophon towards Phnom Penh
Preceding station	State Railway of Thailand	Following station
Ban Klong Luk Border towards Hua Lamphong	Eastern Line	Terminus
Location

Poipet railway station is a railway station in Poipet, Banteay Meanchey Province, Cambodia located 850 metres (2,790 ft) from the border of Thailand. It is the railway terminus of the Phnom Penh–Poipet Line and also connects to the State Railway of Thailand via Eastern Line.

== History ==
The Phnom Penh-Poipet railway linking to Thailand and the station was built in 1942. However five years later, it was removed after the World War II ends and it was rebuilt in 1953, upon Cambodia's request and opened it on 22 April 1955, though it was closed again in 1961 due to strained Cambodia–Thailand relations. The cross-border link between Aranyaprathet and Poipet was reopened in April 2019, and temporarily suspended between 2020-21 due to the COVID-19 pandemic.
