= Rail transport in Thailand =

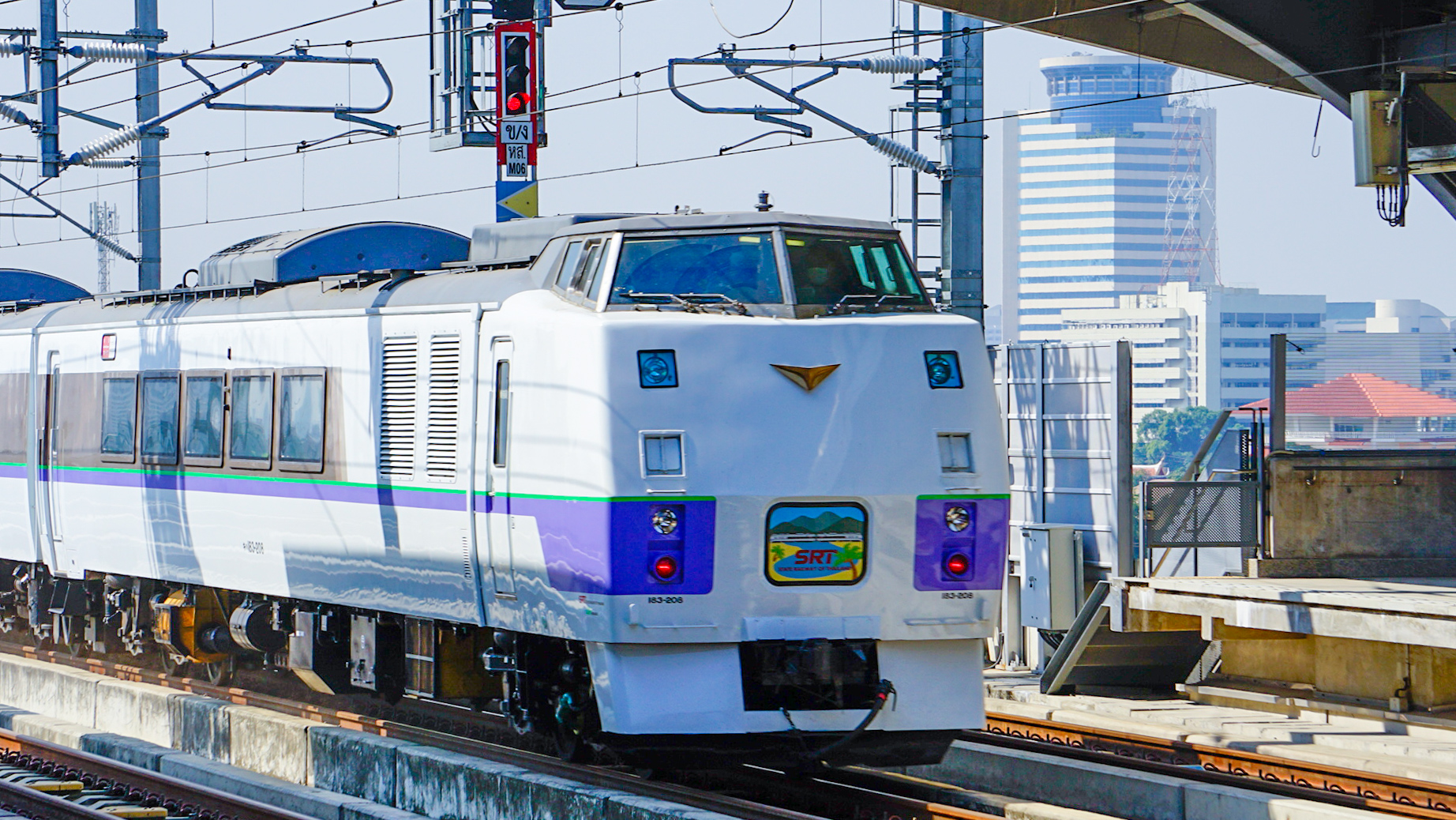
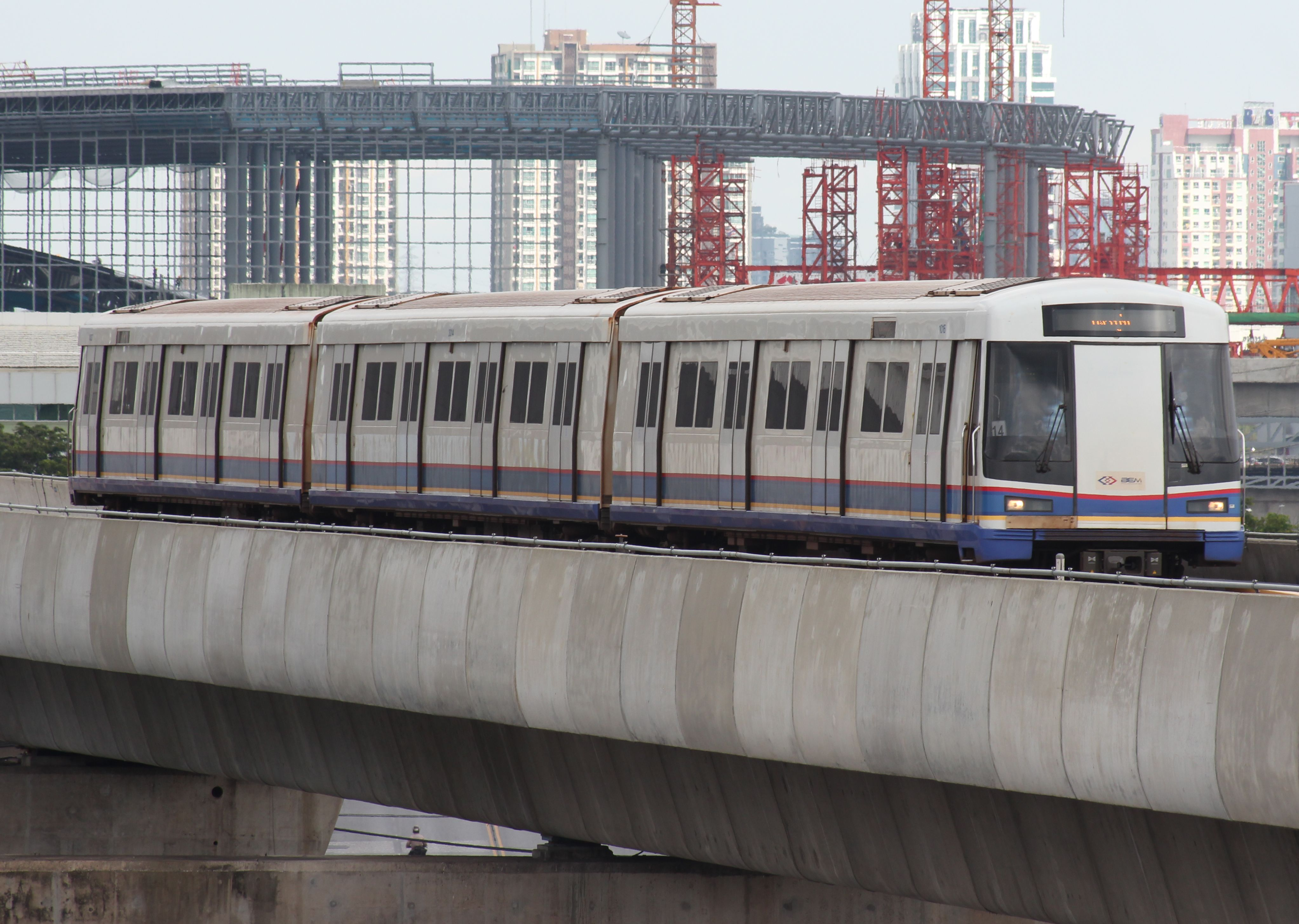
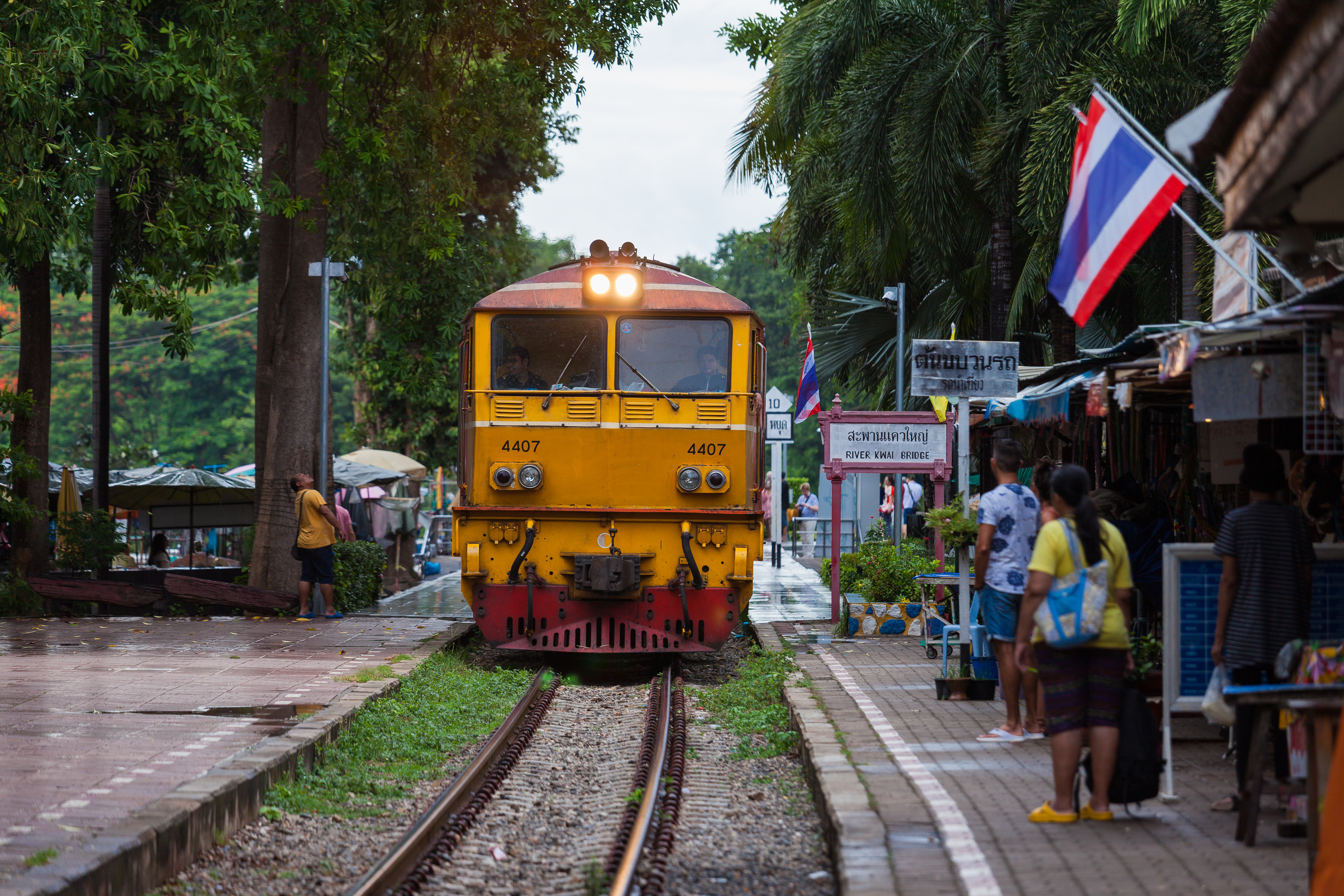
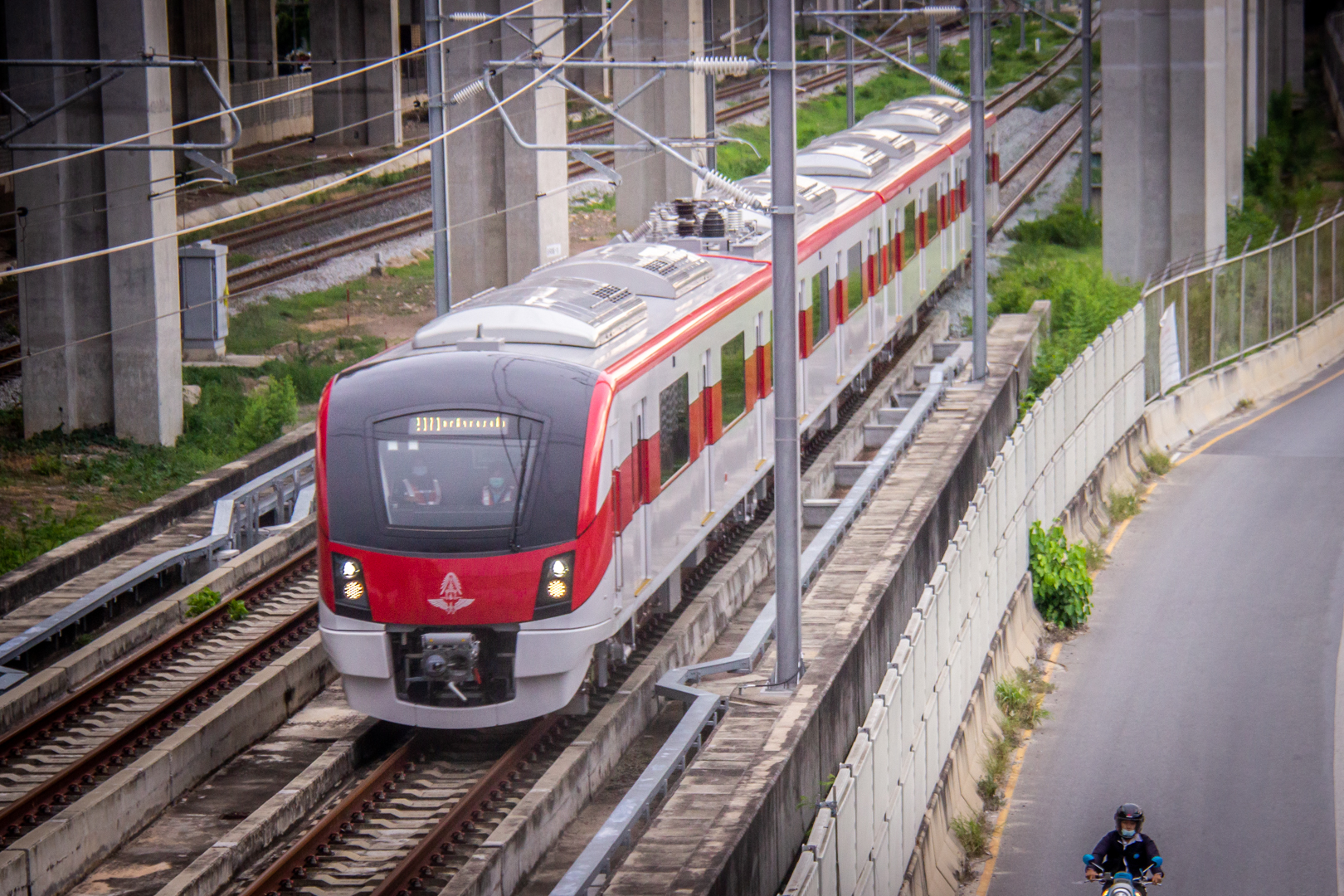
- Clockwise from top: KiHa 183 at Thung Song Hong station, MRT Blue Line, SRT Red Lines, Alstom AD24C at Kanchanaburi

Operation
- National railway: State Railway of Thailand
- Major operators: BTSC; Silom Sukhumvit Gold; BEM; Blue Purple Orange; AERA1; ARL; SRTET; Light Red Dark Red; Eastern Bangkok Monorail Company Limited and Northern Bangkok Monorail Company Limited; MRT MRT

Statistics
- Ridership: 488.74 million a year (2023)

System length
- Total: 4,845.1 km (3,010.6 mi) (2023)
- Electrified: 276.15 km (171.59 mi) (2025)

Track gauge
- Main: 1,000 mm (3 ft 3 3/8 in); 1,435 mm (4 ft 8 1/2 in)

Features
- Longest tunnel: Dong Phaya Yen Tunnel; 5.850 km (3.635 mi)
Map
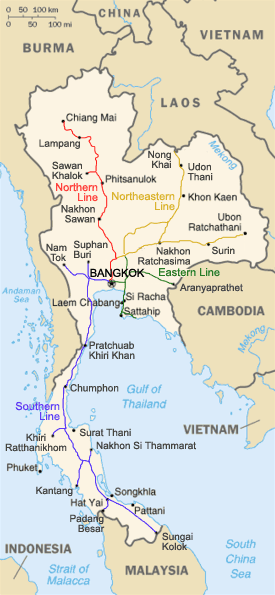

Rail transport plays a crucial role in connecting various regions of Thailand, transporting both goods and passengers through a range of transportation options that include inter-city and commuter rail, mass rapid transit, monorails, and airport rail links. The State Railway of Thailand (SRT) operates a network of intercity railways spanning 4,845.1 kilometers, covering 47 provinces across the country. SRT is committed to developing railway lands through its subsidiary, SRT Asset (SRTA), which focuses on transit-oriented development (TOD) initiatives. The Krung Thep Aphiwat Central Terminal in Bangkok serves as the primary transportation hub for rail transport in Thailand, connecting various types of rail transportation throughout the country. It covers an area of 274,192 square meters, making it the largest railway station in Southeast Asia, and is situated in a new central business district (CBD) that is currently being developed.

To further expand and improve its railway network, particularly through the construction of double-track railways, Thailand has invested in several expansion projects. The first phase of this expansion project covers seven routes, two of which have been completed, while the remaining five are under construction. The second phase of the expansion project is expected to begin construction in 2023. There are also plans for 12 new railway routes with a total distance of 2,419 kilometers, which will increase the number of provinces with railways passing through them to 61.

The mass rapid transit system in Bangkok and its surrounding areas has been operating since 1999. It comprises elevated, ground-level, underground, and under-river electric trains, spanning 211.94 kilometers with 11 routes and 141 stations. The network is expanding with five new lines and six extensions currently under construction, bidding, or preparation.

Thailand is also investing in high-speed rail to enhance its rail transport system. Currently, the Bangkok–Nong Khai route and the Bangkok–U-tapao route are under construction, covering 608 kilometers and 220 kilometers, respectively. There are also plans to construct two more high-speed rail lines, the Bangkok-Chiangmai route and the Bangkok-Padang Besar route, in the near future.

== History ==
Rail transport in Thailand has a long and varied history. Its earliest recorded railway-related event dates back to 1855, when King Rama IV received a model railway as a gift from Queen Victoria. The country's first railway line, the Paknam Railway, was built under a 50-year concession with a Danish company and opened to the public in 1894, after being constructed in 1891. Alongside the Paknam Railway, Bangkok also had an early form of rail transport in the form of a tram system. It was initially a horse tram system that started operating on 22 September 1888, and was later electrified in 1892, becoming the first electrified tram system in Asia. The tram system, however, ceased operations on 11 October 1968, after nearly 80 years of service. On the other hand, the Paknam Railway was electrified in 1925 and operated for almost 68 years until its closure on 1 January 1959.

In 1890, King Rama V established the Department of Railways under the Ministry of Public Works to oversee the construction of a railway network in the country. The construction of the Bangkok-Ayutthaya railway began in 1891 and was completed on 26 March 1896, which marked the establishment of the railway business in Thailand. Subsequently, the railway service was extended to Nakhon Ratchasima in 1900, forming the original section of what is now known as the Northeastern Line. The Northern Line, which extended to Chiang Mai, was constructed from Ayutthaya, and the Lopburi segment was the first part of this railway route to become operational, opening for service in 1901. The line to Phetchaburi, later known as the Southern Line, was inaugurated on 19 June 1903, while the Eastern Line connecting Bangkok and Chachoengsao began operations in 1907.

Initially, the Northern, Northeastern, and Eastern Lines were constructed to standard gauge (1,435 mm.) while the Southern Line was built to meter gauge (1,000 mm.). However, in September 1919, a decision was made to regauge all lines to meter gauge, which took 10 years to complete. On 5 June 1917, King Rama VI issued a royal command to change the name of the Department of Railways to Royal State Railways of Siam (RSR) by merging the Northern Railway Department and the Southern Railway Department together. The RSR was later renamed the State Railway of Thailand (SRT) on 1 July 1951, under Prime Minister Plaek Phibunsongkhram.

In 1916, the construction of Bangkok railway station, also known as Hua Lampong railway station, was finished and it was inaugurated during the reign of King Rama VI. Initially erected under the reign of King Rama V, the station served as a crucial railway transportation center in Thailand until Krung Thep Aphiwat Central Terminal was constructed.

In the late 1990s, Thailand's rail transport underwent a modernization with the introduction of rapid transit systems. To organize mass transportation systems in Bangkok and its surrounding areas by electric train, the Mass Rapid Transit Authority of Thailand (MRTA) was established in 1992. The BTS Skytrain, which was the first rapid transit system in Bangkok, is owned by the Bangkok Metropolitan Administration (BMA), began operations in 1999 and is operated under a concession from the BMA granted to Bangkok Mass Transit System (BTSC). The Bangkok Metro, with its first line being the Blue Line, is the first underground railway that opened in 2004. It is owned by the MRTA and operated by the Bangkok Expressway and Metro (BEM) under a concession granted by the MRTA. The Airport Rail Link, which opened in 2010 and has transformed commuting in the capital city, is owned by the State Railway of Thailand and operated by its subsidiary, the SRT Electric Train (SRTET). Since then, the government has embarked on several high-speed rail projects to connect different parts of the country. The Bangkok–Nong Khai route, a 606-kilometer line, was initiated in 2014 with an MOU between Thailand and China for co-financing. However, in 2016, the Thai government decided to finance the entire project, and it is 100% Thai invested and operated for construction. China is assisting in the civil works, including the design, supervision, and installation of electrical and mechanical systems. The first section, from Bangkok to Nakhon Ratchasima, is already under construction and expected to be completed in 2026, with the second section, from Nakhon Ratchasima to Nong Khai, scheduled to begin construction in 2023. The Don Mueang–Suvarnabhumi–U-Tapao route, a 220-kilometer line connecting three major airports, was signed in 2019 with construction scheduled to start in 2023. The Bangkok–Chiang Mai route, which covers a distance of 688 kilometers, has been the focus of joint efforts by Thailand and Japan since the signing of a Memorandum of Cooperation (MOC) in 2015. As of 8 March 2023, the project's economic and financial feasibility study has now been completed, and the results show that it is worth the investment. The section of the project will connect Bangkok to Phitsanulok, while the second section will connect Phitsanulok to Chiang Mai.

Since 2017, Thailand has been upgrading its railway signaling systems with the implementation of the European Train Control System (ETCS), starting with the Eastern Line and followed by the Red Line. This upgrade has gradually been extended to mainlines throughout the country, with Automatic Train Protection (ATP) being put in place to ensure the highest safety standards for railway transportation. On 15 April 2019, the Department of Rail Transport (DRT) was established as a government agency under the Ministry of Transport to oversee the national rail transport system in Thailand. The DRT is responsible for regulating and standardizing policies, strategies, and plans for supervising rail transport businesses throughout the country, with the goal of improving safety, efficiency, and reliability.

As of 2020, the State Railway of Thailand (SRT) operates a total of 4,814.862 kilometers of intercity railways across the country, and is working on upgrading its lines to double-track railways. Double-track railways have several advantages over single-track railways, such as higher capacity, safety, and speed. Passenger trains on double-track railways can travel at an average speed of 100-120 kilometers per hour, while freight trains can travel at an average speed of 60 kilometers per hour. Double-track railways also eliminate level crossings and install fences along the line, which help to reduce accidents and improve safety. The SRT has embarked on several expansion projects to further extend and enhance its railway network. The first phase of the expansion project covers seven routes, two of which have been completed, while the remaining five are under construction. The second phase of the expansion project, which is expected to begin construction in 2023. Furthermore, there are plans for 12 new railway routes with a total distance of 2,419 kilometers. As a result, the number of provinces with railways passing through them will increase to 61.

On 30 April 2021, SRT Asset was established, following the approval of the Cabinet on 29 September 2020, with the main objectives of managing and developing the assets of State Railway of Thailand, and developing transit-oriented development (TOD) projects to increase connectivity and accessibility within the country. The company is currently focusing on the areas around Krung Thep Aphiwat Central Terminal, Thonburi, and Mae Nam with plans to develop them into major mixed-use projects. In the same year, the first phase of the Red Lines, a commuter rail line in the Bangkok Metropolitan Region, opened for service after several years of construction. And in 2022, the newly constructed Krung Thep Aphiwat Central Terminal replaced Bangkok railway station as the country's central railway transportation hub. The terminal is the largest station in Southeast Asia, with a total floor space of over 274,000 square meters, and it has 24 platforms: 12 for inter-city and commuter rail, 12 for future high-speed rail and airport rail link. It also has an underground connection to the MRT Blue Line.

== Operators ==
=== State Railway of Thailand ===
State Railway of Thailand (SRT) is responsible for overseeing the operation of intercity railways in Thailand, offering diesel-hauled and electric-powered passenger trains, as well as freight services across the nation. However, the SRT has gained a reputation for inefficiency and poor maintenance, resulting in delayed trains and outdated equipment. In 2010, the SRT reported a preliminary loss of 7.58 billion baht. Despite multiple attempts at restructuring and privatization in the 2000s, strong union opposition has prevented significant changes. As of a 2022 report, the SRT has taken measures to improve safety by closing 122 level crossings and illegal crossings throughout Thailand and constructing overpasses and underpasses in double-track railway project to address level crossing issues.

=== BTS Group Holdings ===
BTS Group Holdings is the majority share holder of Bangkok Mass Transit System (BTSC) who operates the BTS Skytrain (Sukhumvit Line, Silom Line and Gold Line) in Bangkok under a concession granted by the Bangkok Metropolitan Administration (BMA). The investment for the structure and system were fully supported by BTSC. The Bangkok BRT is also operated by BTSC.

Eastern Bangkok Monorail (EBM) and Northern Bangkok Monorail (NBM) operate the Yellow and Pink monorail lines respectively. The companies were established by the BSR consortium consisting of BTS Group Holdings (BTSG) with Sino-Thai Engineering and Construction (STEC), and Ratchaburi Electricity Generation Holding (RATCH), who won the bid to construct and operate both monorail systems in early December 2016, and signed contracts with the Mass Rapid Transit Authority of Thailand in June 2017.

=== Bangkok Expressway and Metro ===
Bangkok Expressway and Metro (BEM) operates two metro lines in Bangkok, the MRT Blue Line and MRT Purple Line, under 25-year concession agreements with the Mass Rapid Transit Authority of Thailand (MRTA). BEM was formed in 2015 by the merger of Bangkok Expressway Public Company Limited (BECL) and Bangkok Metro Public Company Limited (BMCL).

=== Asia Era One ===
Asia Era One (AERA1) currently operates the Airport Rail Link, which was previously operated by the SRT Electrified Train (SRTET), a subsidiary of the State Railway of Thailand (SRT). However, in October 2021, the operation of the line was transferred to a new entity led by a consortium including Charoen Pokphand (CP) and partners such as Ch. Karnchang (CK), Bangkok Expressway and Metro (BEM), Italian-Thai Development (ITD), and China Railway Construction Corporation (CRCC). This new entity rebranded the service as AERA1 and will also operate the upcoming Don Mueang–Suvarnabhumi–U-Tapao high-speed railway.

=== SRT Electrified Train ===
SRT Electrified Train (SRTET) is a wholly owned subsidiary of the State Railway of Thailand (SRT) and operates the Red Lines, a commuter rail service in the Bangkok Metropolitan Region. The company also formerly operated the Airport Rail Link until the operation of the line was transferred to Asia Era One (AERA1) in October 2021.

== Network ==
=== Inter-city rail ===
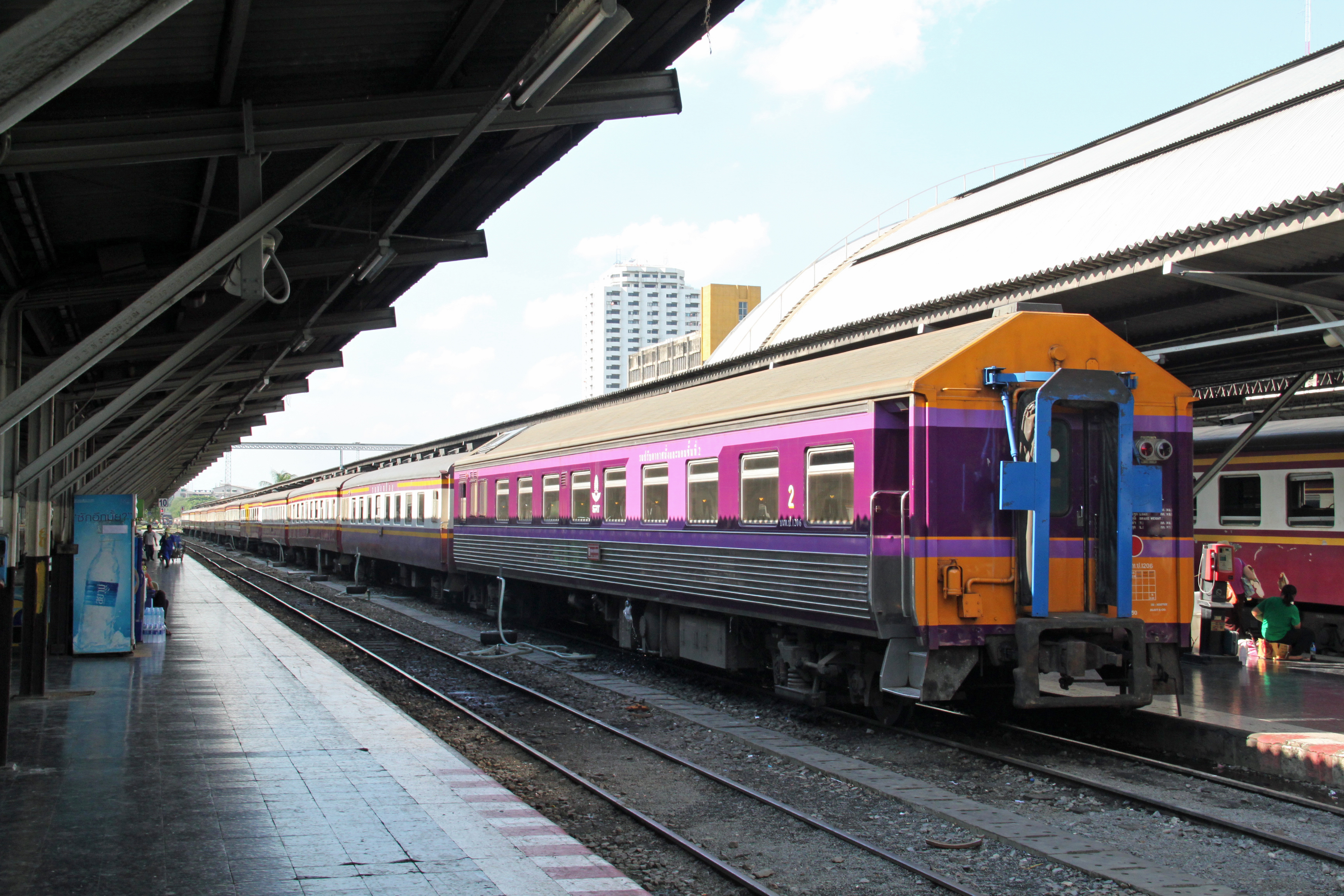
Second-class carriage of the State Railway of Thailand at Bangkok railway station

Thailand's inter-city rail network covers a distance of 4,814.862 kilometers, serving 47 provinces, and is managed by the State Railway of Thailand (SRT). The network is divided into four main routes: Northern Line, Northeastern Line, Eastern Line, and Southern Line, with single tracks covering 3,391.513 kilometers, (Note: This number includes the 65.283 kilometers of the Maeklong Railway, which is classified as a single track.) double tracks covering 1,103.192 kilometers, and triple tracks covering 320.157 kilometers.

The country is currently expanding its railway network through the double-track railway project, which aims to upgrade existing single tracks to double tracks. The project covers a total of 3,157 kilometers, with Phase 1 already completed for two out of seven lines spanning 993 kilometers. Phase 2 is currently underway, consisting of seven routes totaling 1,483 kilometers. Double-track railway project is expected to significantly increase transportation capacity, with annual railway freight transport projected to rise from 11 million to 46 million tons by 2027.

Two new railway lines covering 681 kilometers are also currently under construction, and the next phase of the new railway project will add 12 new routes covering 2,419 kilometers. Upon completion of all phases, the railway will pass throughout a total of 61 provinces.

==== Current ====
Line		Route	Stations (Note: Including halts)	Length (Note: Might not be accurate)		Opening	Tracks	Gauge	Notes
Line		Route	Stations	km	mi	Opening	Tracks	Gauge	Notes
Northern	Chiang Mai Main Line	Bangkok–Chiang Mai	122	751.480 km	466.948 mi	1922	Single; Double; Triple	Metre gauge	
Northern	Sawankhalok Branch Line	Ban Dara Junction–Sawankhalok	3	29.007 km	18.024 mi	1910	Single	Metre gauge	
Northeastern	Ubon Ratchathani Main Line	Bangkok–Ubon Ratchathani	71 (Note: From Ban Phachi Junction)	575 km	357 mi	1930	Single; Double; Triple	Metre gauge	
Northeastern	Bua Yai Branch Line	Kaeng Khoi Junction–Bua Yai Junction	40	249.887 km	155.273 mi	1967	Single	Metre gauge	
Northeastern	Nong Khai Main Line	Bangkok–Nong Khai	44 (Note: From Thanon Chira Junction)	624 km	388 mi	1958	Single; Double; Triple	Metre gauge	
Northeastern	Nong Khai Main Line	Nong Khai–Thanaleng, Laos	2	6 km	3.7 mi	2009	Single	Metre gauge	Opened by Princess Sirindhorn
Eastern	Aranyaprathet Main Line	Bangkok–Aranyaprathet	53	255 km	158 mi	1926	Single; Double; Triple	Metre gauge	Ban Klong Luk Border railway station at km 260 opened on 25 June 2019 even though the actual traffic started on 1 July 2019.
Eastern	Ban Phlu Ta Luang Main Line	Chachoengsao Junction–Chuk Samet-	20	134 km	83 mi	1989	Single; Double	Metre gauge	Section from Ban Phlu Ta Luang railway station to Sattahip intermittently closed and reopened.
Eastern	Laem Chabang Line	Si Racha Junction–Laem Chabang	2	13.457 km	8.362 mi		Single; Double	Metre gauge	
Eastern	Map Ta Phut Line	Khao Chi Chan Junction–Map Ta Phut	3	24.070 km	14.956 mi		Single	Metre gauge	
Eastern	Kaeng Khoi Junction Branch Line	Khlong Sip Kao Junction–Kaeng Khoi Junction	7	81.358 km	50.554 mi	1995	Double	Metre gauge	The line was originally a single track but was later upgraded to a double track, with construction beginning on 19 February 2016 and completed on 18 February 2019 It also connects with Northeastern Line.
Eastern	Mae Nam Line	Makkasan–Mae Nam	2	6.600 km	4.101 mi	1909	Single	Metre gauge	Freight only
Southern	Su-ngai Kolok Main Line	Thonburi–Su-ngai Kolok	204	1,144.160 km	710.948 mi	1921	Single; Double; Triple	Metre gauge	
Southern	Suphanburi Branch Line	Nong Pladuk Junction–Suphanburi	16	78.090 km	48.523 mi	1963	Single	Metre gauge	
Southern	Nam Tok Branch Line	Nong Pladuk Junction–Nam Tok	29	130.989 km	81.393 mi	1958	Single	Metre gauge	
Southern	Khiri Rat Nikhom Branch Line	Ban Thung Pho Junction–Khiri Rat Nikhom	9	31.250 km	19.418 mi	1956	Single	Metre gauge	
Southern	Kantang Branch Line	Thung Song Junction–Kantang	6	92.802 km	57.664 mi	1913	Single	Metre gauge	
Southern	Nakhon Si Thammarat Branch Line	Khao Chum Thong Junction–Nakhon Si Thammarat	9	35.081 km	21.798 mi	1914	Single	Metre gauge	
Southern	Padang Besar Branch Line	Hat Yai Junction–Padang Besar, Malaysia	4	45 km	28 mi	1918	Single	Metre gauge	Connecting to the Western Coast Line of FMSR

==== Proposed and under construction ====
===== New =====
Route	Stations	Length		Tracks	Gauge	Start	Completion	Status
Route	Stations	km	mi	Tracks	Gauge	Start	Completion	Status
Den Chai–Chiang Rai–Chiang Khong	26	323.1 km	200.8 mi	Double	Metre gauge	2022	2028	Under construction
Ban Phai–Mukdahan–Nakhon Phanom	18	355 km	221 mi	Double	Metre gauge	2023	2028	Under construction
Mae Sot–Tak–Kamphaeng Phet-Nakhon Sawan	27	250.875 km	155.886 mi	Double	Metre gauge			Proposed
Nakhon Sawan–Ban Phai	15	304.318 km	189.094 mi	Double	Metre gauge			Proposed
Sisaket–Yasothon–Roi et		162 km	101 mi	Double	Metre gauge			Proposed
Ubon Ratchathani–Chong Mek	4	87 km	54 mi	Double	Metre gauge			Proposed
Kanchanaburi–Ban Phu Nam Ron		36 km	22 mi	Double	Metre gauge			Proposed
Kanchanaburi–Suphanburi–Ban Phachi Junction		221 km	137 mi	Double	Metre gauge			Proposed
Si Racha–Rayong	5	136 km	85 mi	Double	Metre gauge			Proposed
Map Ta Phut–Rayong–Chanthaburi–Trat–Khlong Yai	29	197 km	122 mi	Double	Metre gauge			Proposed
Chumphon–Ranong	9	109 km	68 mi	Double	Metre gauge			Proposed
Surat Thani–Phang Nga–Tha Nun	12	163 km	101 mi	Double	Metre gauge			Proposed
Tha Nun–Phuket international Airport	3	20 km	12 mi	Double	Metre gauge			Proposed
Surat Thani–Don Sak	14	77 km	48 mi	Double	Metre gauge			Proposed
Thap Put–Krabi	10	68 km	42 mi	Double	Metre gauge			Proposed
Chatturat-Chaiyaphum-Loei-Nong Bua Lamphu	30	333 km	207 mi	Double	Metre gauge			Proposed
Lam Narai-Phetchabun-Loei-Nong Bua Lamphu	35	392 km	244 mi	Double	Metre gauge			Proposed
Phare-Nan	10	90 km	56 mi	Double	Metre gauge			Proposed
Nan-Huai Kon		120 km	75 mi	Double	Metre gauge			Proposed
Phayao-Huai Kon	14	142 km	88 mi	Double	Metre gauge			Proposed

===== Upgrade =====
Route	Stations	Length		Tracks	Gauge	Start	Completion	Status
Route	Stations	km	mi	Tracks	Gauge	Start	Completion	Status
Chachoengsao Junction–Kaeng Khoi Junction	7	106 km	66 mi	Double	Metre gauge	2016	2019	Completed
Thanon Chira Junction–Khon Kaen	19	187 km	116 mi	Double	Metre gauge	2016	2019	Completed
Map Kabao–Thanon Chira Junction	19	134 km	83 mi	Double	Metre gauge	2019	2023	Under construction
Lopburi–Pak Nam Pho	21	148 km	92 mi	Double	Metre gauge	2019	2025	Completed
Nakhon Pathom–Hua Hin	27	169 km	105 mi	Double	Metre gauge	2019	2024	Completed
Hua Hin–Prachuap Khiri Khan	12	84 km	52 mi	Double	Metre gauge	2019	2024	Completed
Prachuap Khiri Khan–Chumphon	20	167 km	104 mi	Double	Metre gauge	2019	2024	Completed
Pak Nam Pho–Den Chai	38	281 km	175 mi	Double	Metre gauge			Prepared for Cabinet approval
Den Chai–Chiang Mai	17	189 km	117 mi	Double	Metre gauge			Prepared for Cabinet approval
Khon Kaen–Nong Khai	15	167 km	104 mi	Double	Metre gauge	2024		Under construction
Thanon Chira Junction–Ubon Ratchathani	35	308 km	191 mi	Double	Metre gauge			Prepared for Cabinet approval
Chumphon–Surat Thani	21	168 km	104 mi	Double	Metre gauge			Prepared for Cabinet approval
Surat Thani–Songkhla	48	321 km	199 mi	Double	Metre gauge			Prepared for Cabinet approval
Hat Yai Junction–Padang Besar	3	45 km	28 mi	Double	Metre gauge			Prepared for Cabinet approval
Hat Yai Junction–Su-ngai Kolok	27	216 km	134 mi	Double	Metre gauge			Proposed

==== Defunct ====
Route	Length	Gauge	Established	Closed	Notes
Hat Yai–Songkhla	30 km (19 mi)	Metre gauge	1913	1 July 1978	Began operations in 1913. In 1978 the Cabinet has approved the cancellation of Hat Yai–Songkhla lines, but preserve the railways. Now are under study to rebuild again as part of the Surat Thani-Hat Yai-Songkhla double tracking project.
Nam Tok–Thanbyuzayat, Myanmar (Burma Railway)	285 km (177 mi)	Metre gauge	25 December 1944	–	Ceased operations after World War II. Also known as the Burma Railway or Death Railway.
Bangkok–Samut Prakan (Paknam Railway)	21 km (13 mi)	Narrow gauge	11 April 1893	1960	It is the first railway in Thailand. Open in 1893, operated by Paknam Railway Co.Ltd. In 1943, It is operated by State Railway of Thailand. In 1960 the cabinet approved the closure of the Paknam Railway to make Rama IV road.
Bang Phlat–Bang Bua Thong	68 km (42 mi)	Narrow gauge (75 cm)	1909	1943	
Chumphon–Kraburi (Kra Isthmus Railway)	90 km (56 mi)	Metre gauge	1943	1945	Constructed by the Imperial Japanese Army for transport across the Kra Isthmus. Demolished after the Second World War.
Bung Wai–Ban Pho Mun	7 km (4.3 mi)	Metre gauge	1 August 1930	1954	Closed due to inconvenience of transport of goods
Nong Khai–Talat Nong Khai	2 km (1.2 mi)	Metre gauge	1958	19 March 2008	
Su-ngai Kolok–Rantau Panjang	3 km (1.9 mi)	Metre gauge	1921	–	Closed due to increased tensions between SRT and KTM in operating cross-border rail services. There are plans to reopen the line.
Wongwian Yai–Pak Khlong San	–	Metre gauge	1904	1 January 1961	Closed following Field Marshal Sarit Thanarat's cabinet agreement. Asphalt road paved on top of the existing tracks
Tha Ruea–Phra Phutthabat	20 km (12 mi)	Narrow gauge	1902	1942	Operated by the Tha Ruea Company Limited. Closed due to regular derailments and huge financial losses.
Phetchaburi–Bang Thalu	15 km (9.3 mi)	Narrow gauge	15 April 1921	31 May 1923	Served as a supply route for King Vajiravudh's residence at Chao Samran Beach. Closed and demolished after relocation of residence to Mrigadayavan Palace
Hua Wai–Tha Tako	53 km (33 mi)	Metre gauge	1940	1967	
Wang Kaphi–Wang Kaphi Sugar Mill	8 km (5.0 mi)	Narrow gauge	1940	–	Closed due to improved road links to the sugar mill.

=== Regional rail transport ===
==== Rail transport in Bangkok ====
===== Commuter rail =====
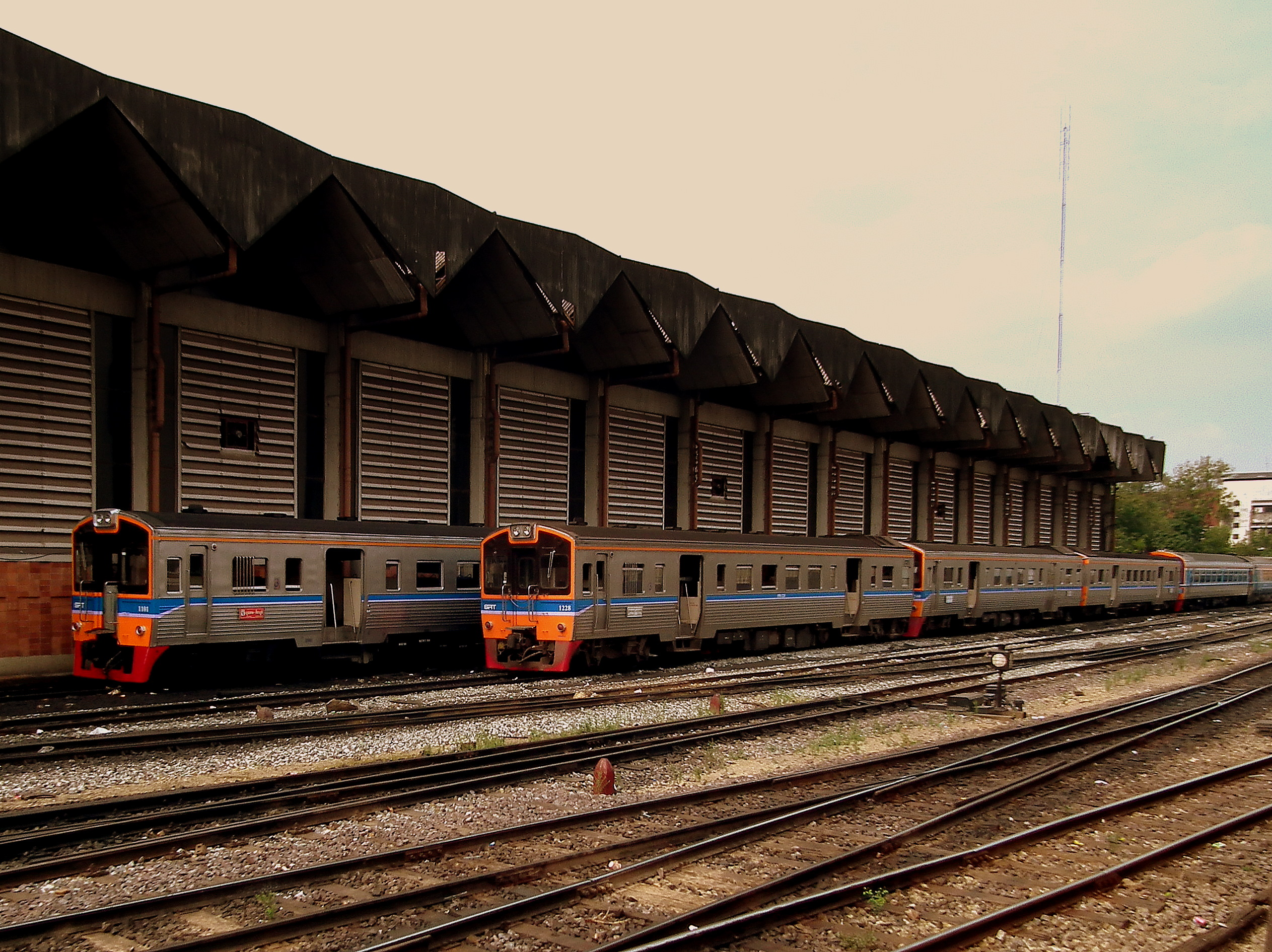
Commuter rail at Hua Lamphong Railway Station

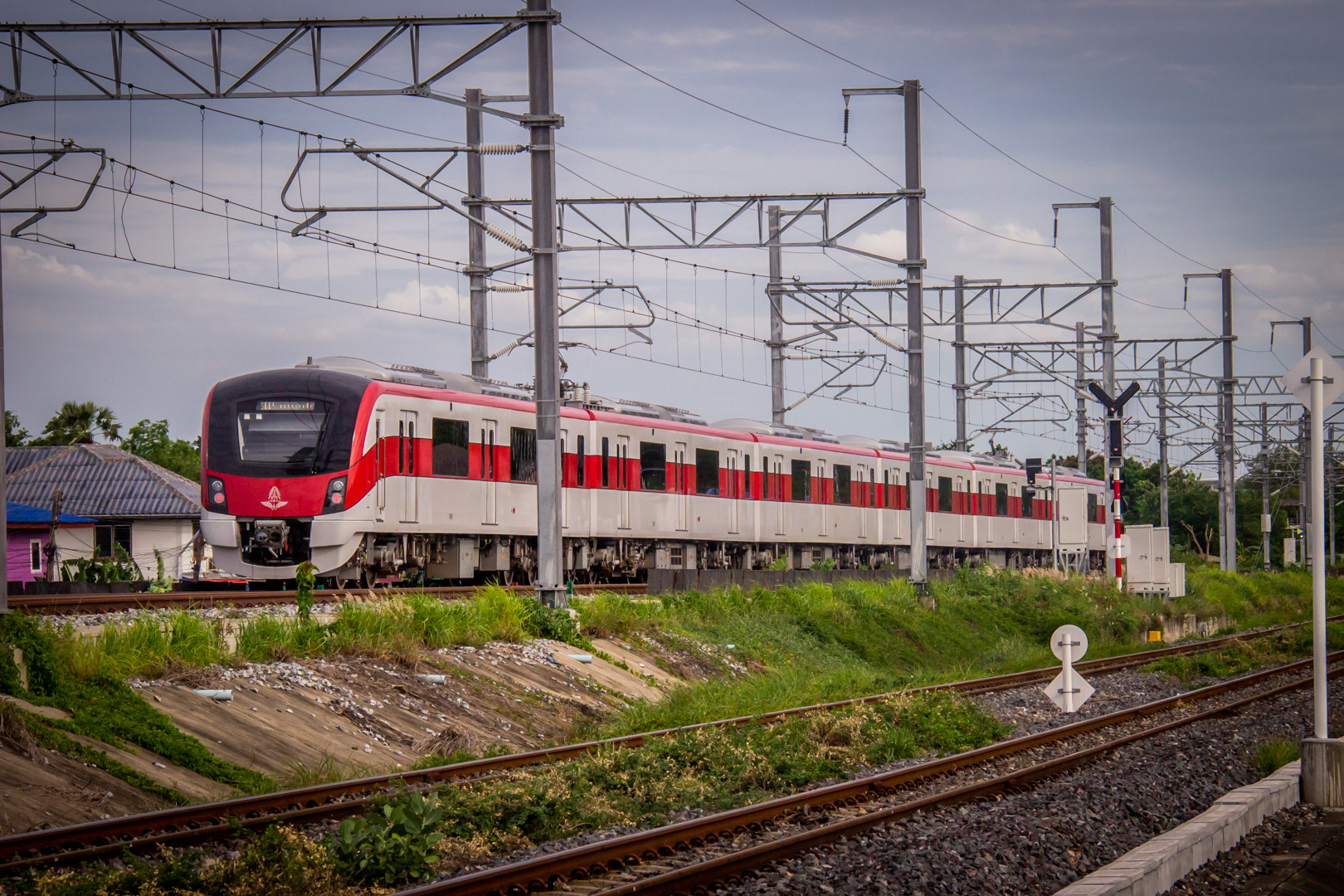
The SRT Dark Red Line, an electrified commuter rail line, features the Hitachi AT100 model train in its fleet, capable of reaching speeds of up to 160 km/h.

The State Railway of Thailand (SRT) manages the commuter rail system in the Bangkok Metropolitan Region, which primarily serves individuals traveling to work, school, or business within a 150-kilometer radius of Bangkok. With stops at every station along the way, several commuter rail lines are available for passengers, such as the Northern Line connecting to Lopburi, the Northeastern Line connecting to Kaeng Khoi Junction, the Eastern Line connecting to Prachinburi, and the Southern Line connecting to Ratchaburi and Suphanburi. The fully electrified Red Lines, which is powered by overhead lines, is a commuter rail system consisting of two lines: the Dark Red Line and the Light Red Line. Both lines fall under the category of commuter rail. The Maeklong Railway, on the other hand, is a separate entity consisting of two sections that are not connected to the main commuter rail lines. The first section links Wongwian Yai to Samut Sakhon, while the second section connects Ban Laem, Samut Sakhon, Maeklong, Samut Songkhram.

The SRT has plans to upgrade the existing railway system by electrifying the metre-gauge railway, with the aim of moving away from the current diesel-powered system. The proposed electrification plan will begin by transforming the commuter rail lines within a 100-kilometer radius of Bangkok in Phase 1, expanding to a 250-kilometer radius in Phase 2, and eventually to a 500-kilometer radius in Phase 3.

Line		Route	Type	Stations	Length		Opening	Gauge	Notes
Line		Route	Type	Stations	km	mi	Opening	Gauge	Notes
Northern	Lopburi Line	Route	Bangkok–Lopburi	Commuter rail		133 km	83 mi		Metre gauge
Northeastern	Kaeng Khoi Line	Bangkok–Kaeng Khoi Junction	Commuter rail		125 km	78 mi		Metre gauge	
Eastern	Prachinburi Line	Bangkok–Prachinburi	Commuter rail		122 km	76 mi		Metre gauge	
Southern	Ratchaburi Line	Bangkok–Ratchaburi	Commuter rail		117 km	73 mi		Metre gauge	
Southern	Suphanburi Line	Bangkok–Suphanburi	Commuter rail		158 km	98 mi		Metre gauge	
Mae Klong Branch Line	Wongwian Yai Line	Wongwian Yai–Maha Chai	Commuter rail Local	20	31.22 km	19.40 mi	1904	Metre gauge	
Mae Klong Branch Line	Ban Laem–Mae Klong Line	Ban Laem–Mae Klong	Commuter rail Local	15	33.75 km	20.97 mi	1905	Metre gauge	
Red Lines	Dark Red Line	Krungthep Aphiwat–Rangsit	Commuter rail Rapid transit	10	26 km	16 mi	2021	Metre gauge	
Red Lines	Light Red Line	Krungthep Aphiwat–Taling Chan	Commuter rail Rapid transit	4	15 km	9.3 mi	2021	Metre gauge	

===== Rapid transit =====
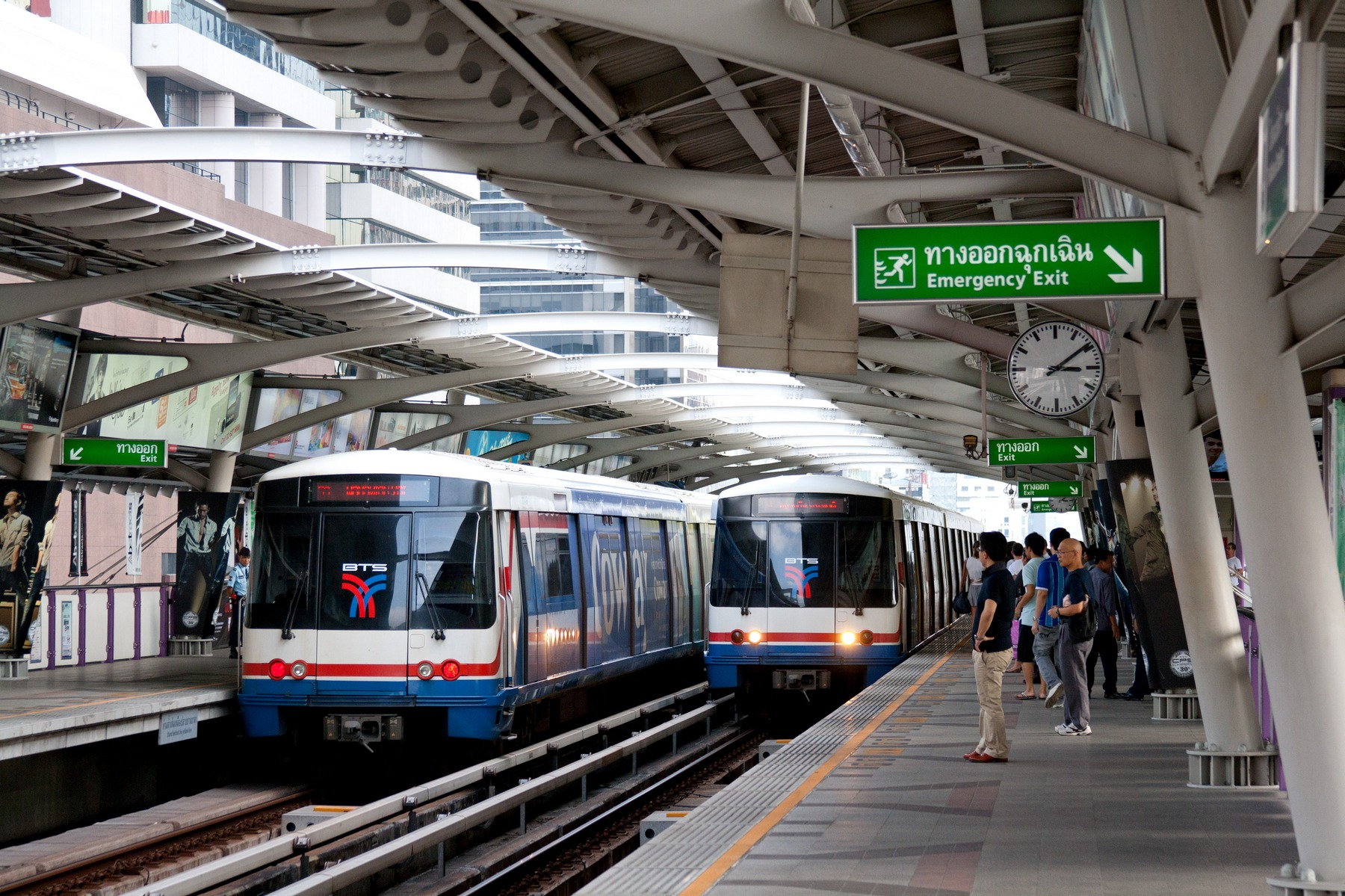
Chong Nonsi Station, an elevated station on the BTS Skytrain Silom Line, which is served by Siemens Modular Metro trains.

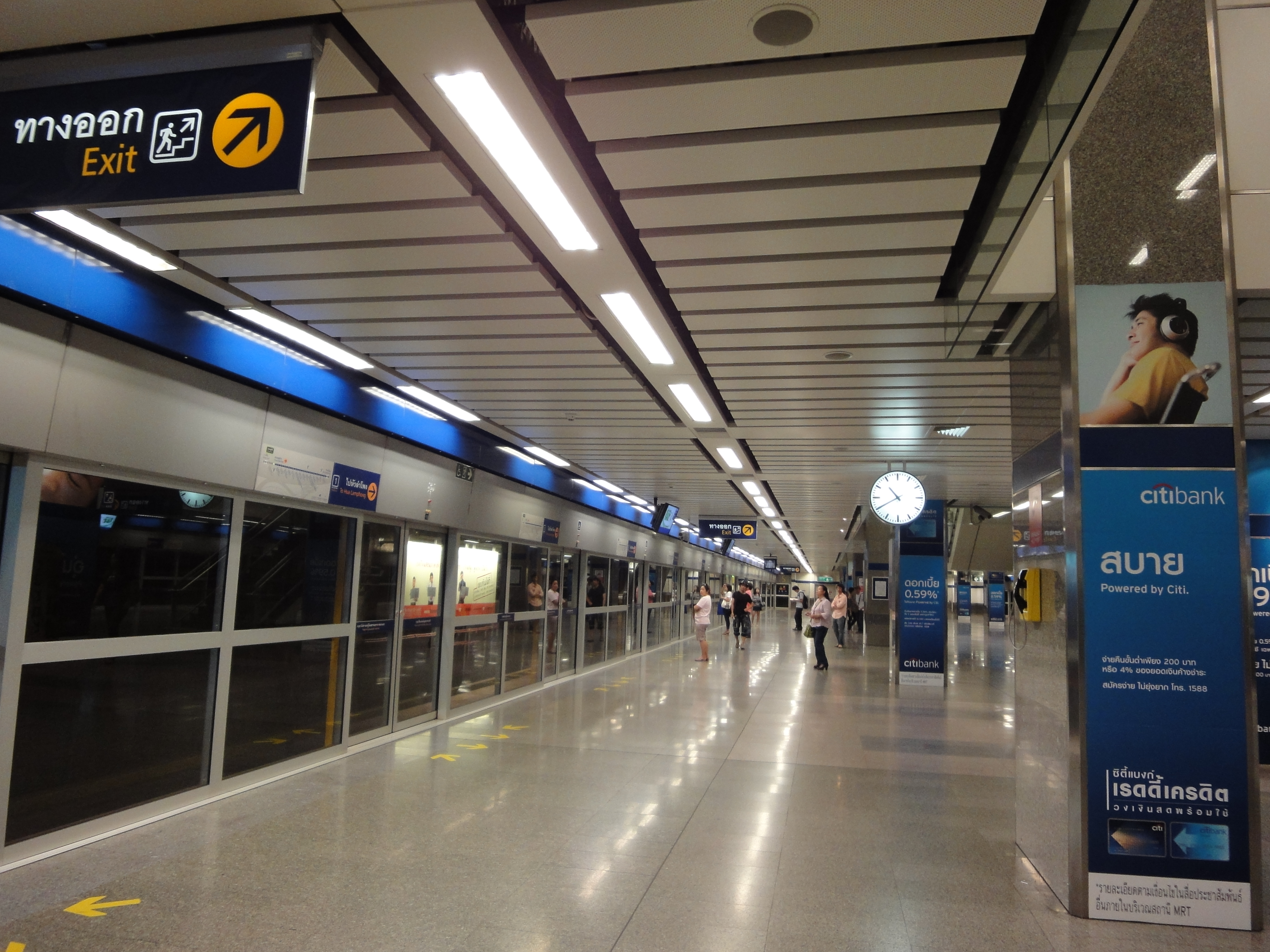
Chatuchak Park Station, an underground station on the MRT Blue Line located in the Chatuchak district.

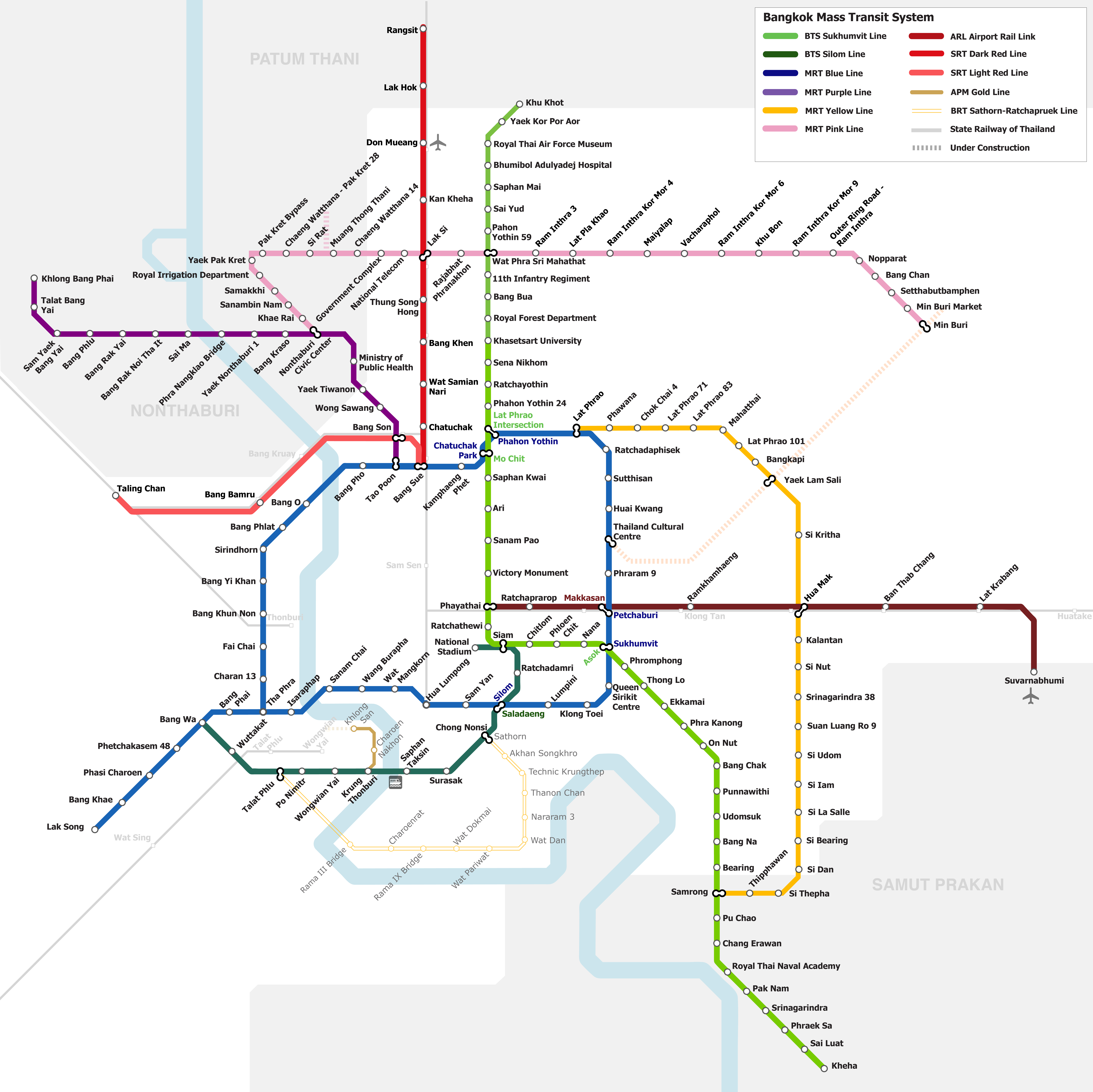
Map of Bangkok urban transit systems

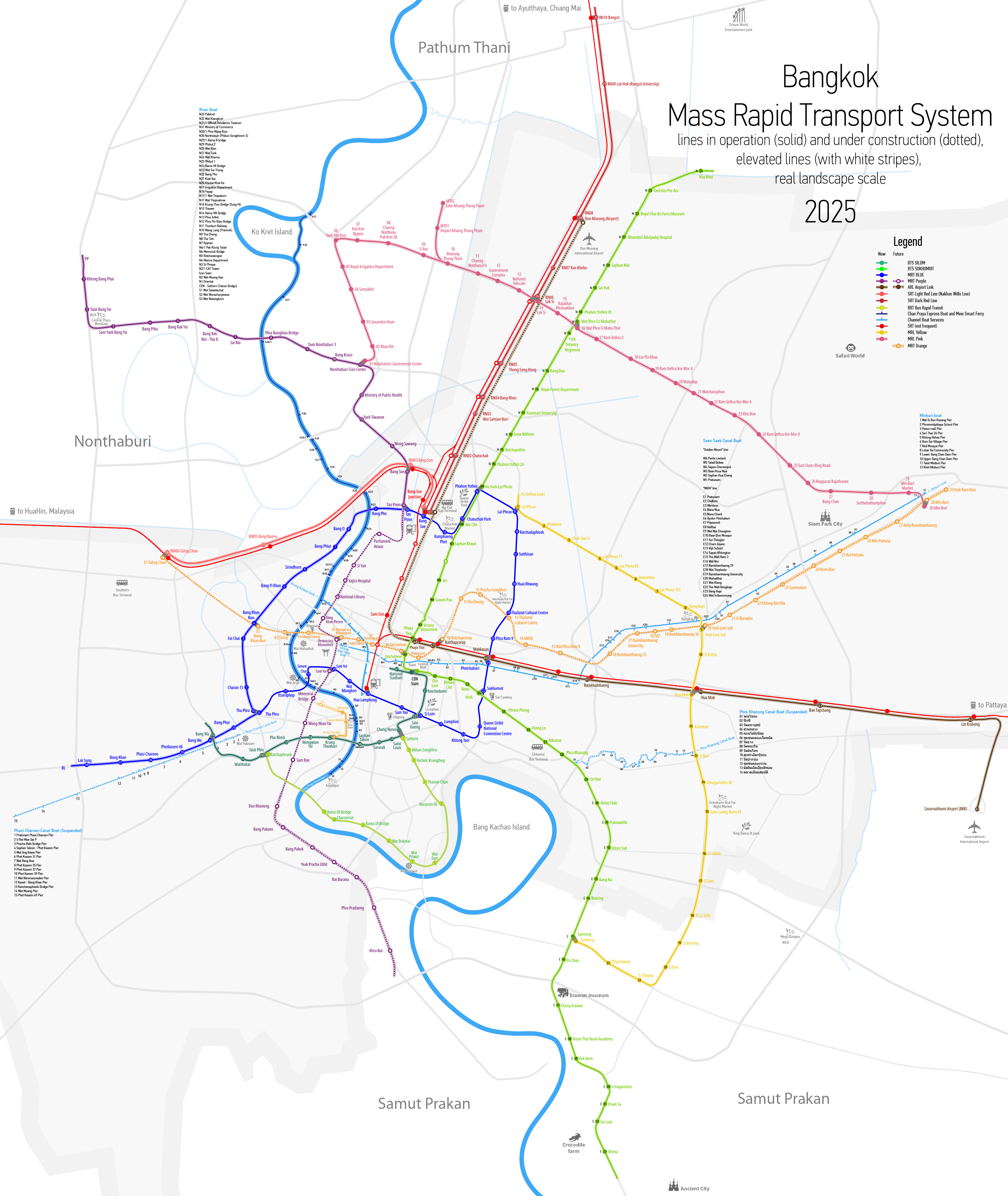
The M-Map details plans for additional rapid transit lines in Bangkok and Metropolitan Region.

Bangkok's rapid transit system comprises several lines, including the BTS Skytrain (Silom Line and Sukhumvit Line and Gold Line ), MRT (Blue Line and Purple Line and Yellow Line), Airport Rail Link, and Red Lines. While the Mass Rapid Transit Authority of Thailand (MRTA) was established in 1992 to oversee the planning and development of the city's rapid transit system, each line is operated by a different company under concession agreements with various government entities.

The BTS Skytrain, which started operating in 1999, was the first rapid transit system to be launched in Bangkok. The system is a public-private partnership between the Bangkok Metropolitan Administration (BMA) and the Bangkok Mass Transit System (BTSC). The BMA signed an agreement with the BTSC in February 1992 to launch city's first elevated railway. The BTS Skytrain includes two lines, the Sukhumvit Line and the Silom Line, and serves the city's central business district, commercial areas, and major tourist destinations. The initial investment for the system was 50 billion baht, with the BTSC as the main investor for 30 years. The BMA oversaw land procurement and appropriation, while the BTSC invested in infrastructure such as tracks, station buildings, maintenance centers, rolling stock, signaling systems, and electrical systems, as well as system operations and maintenance.

The MRT was launched in 2004 with the first line being the Blue Line, which was the first line to have underground stations. The second line, the Purple Line, was opened in 2016. Both lines are operated by Bangkok Expressway and Metro (BEM) under a 25-year concession agreement with the MRTA. The Yellow Line while also part of the MRT is instead operated by Eastern Bangkok Monorail, and opened in 2023.

The Airport Rail Link connects Phaya Thai to Suvarnabhumi Airport and was launched in 2010. Initially operated by the SRT Electrified Train (SRTET), a subsidiary of the State Railway of Thailand (SRT), the operation of the line was transferred to Asia Era One in October 2021.

The Red Lines are a fully electrified commuter rail system that operates as part of the rapid transit network, using overhead contact system (OCS) and operates on a meter gauge rather than standard gauge, making it the first in Bangkok to use OCS for electrification on a meter gauge railway. It is operated by SRT Electrified Train, a subsidiary of the State Railway of Thailand (SRT). The Cabinet approved the project in May 2007, and it finally opened in August 2021. The lines are the fastest meter gauge railways in Thailand, with a maximum speed of 160 km/h. The Red Lines consist of two lines: the Dark Red Line and the Light Red Line. The plan for future expansion is to connect suburban areas in all directions and adjacent provinces. Once the expansions are complete, the Dark Red Line will cover a distance of 185 kilometers from Ayutthaya in the north, through Bangkok, to Ratchaburi in the southwest, while the Light Red Line will span a distance of 124 km, running from Nakhon Pathom to Chachoengsao in the east–west direction.

As of 2023, Bangkok's rapid transit system consists of a total of 9 lines covering 289 kilometers and 163 stations. As of 2022 there were five projects currently under construction covering 112.20 kilometers and 74 stations, two projects under bid covering 31 kilometers and 28 stations, six projects under PPP covering 71.49 kilometers and 38 stations, and nine planned projects covering 120.78 kilometers and 81 stations.

The plan for rapid transit in Bangkok has been in existence since 1994 when the Thai cabinet approved the Mass Rapid Transit System Master Plan (MTMP) for Bangkok. The plan aimed to extend the mass transit lines and build new constructions to achieve a total length of 103 kilometers, including the Bangkok Elevated Road and Train System (BERTS). When the BERTS project was canceled, the MTMP was renamed the Urban Rail Transportation Master Plan in Bangkok and Surrounding Area (URMAP). URMAP proposed a mass transit system with 375 kilometers in total length, separated into three phases. The first phase of 141.9 kilometers was scheduled to finish from 2001 to 2011, followed by the second and third phases of 158.2 kilometers and 75.3 kilometers, respectively. However, the plan's implementation was postponed, and the Bangkok Mass Transit Master Plan (BMT) replaced it in 2004. BMT proposed seven lines with a total length of 291 kilometers, but only 41 kilometers of new tracks were added. Thus, the Office of Transport and Traffic Policy and Planning (OTP) revised the plan again in 2009, calling it the Mass Rapid Transit Master Plan in Bangkok Metropolitan Region (M-MAP), with 12 lines, including eight primary and five feeder lines. However, the Thai government faced some issues with M-MAP, including inaccurate demand forecasting and lack of integration with urban development plans. As a result, they formulated the Second Mass Rapid Transit Master Plan in Bangkok Metropolitan Region (M-MAP2), with a new route development plan, and JICA assisted in its formulation. In March 2017, JICA and the OTP agreed to create the Blueprint for M-MAP2.

====== Current ======
Line			Route	Type	Owner	Operator	Stations	Length		Gauge	Opening		Notes		
Line			Route	Type	Owner	Operator	Stations	km	mi	Gauge	First Section	Last Expansion	Notes		
Line			BTS Skytrain		Sukhumvit Line	Khu Khot – Kheha	Rapid transit	BMA	BTSC	47	54.25 km	33.71 mi	Standard gauge	1999	2020
	Silom Line	National Stadium – Bang Wa	BTS Skytrain	14	14.0 km	8.7 mi	Rapid transit	BMA	BTSC	Standard gauge	1999	2021			
	Gold Line	Krung Thonburi – Khlong San	BTS Skytrain	People Mover	3	1.80 km	1.12 mi	BMA	BTSC	Standard gauge	2020	–	Opened as a test run on 16 December 2020 and began commercial operation on 16 January 2021.		
MRT		Blue Line	Tha Phra–Thailand Cultural Centre–Lak Song	Rapid transit	MRTA	BEM	38	48.0 km	29.8 mi	Standard gauge	2004	2019			
MRT		Purple Line	Khlong Bang Phai–Tao Poon	Rapid transit	MRTA	BEM	16	23.0 km	14.3 mi	Standard gauge	2016	–			
MRT		Pink Line	Nonthaburi Civic Center–Min Buri	Monorail	MRTA	NBM	30	34.5 km	21.4 mi	Guideway beam 30m	2023	–			
MRT		Yellow Line	Lat Phrao–Samrong	Monorail	MRTA	EBM	23	30.4 km	18.9 mi	Guideway beam 30m	2023	–			
ARL		City Line	Suvarnabhumi station–Phaya Thai	Airport rail link	SRT	AERA1	8	28.6 km	17.8 mi	Standard gauge	2010	–			
SRT		Dark Red Line	Krungthep Aphiwat–Rangsit	Commuter rail	SRT	SRT Electrified Train	10	26.3 km	16.3 mi	Metre gauge	2021	–			
SRT		Light Red Line	Krungthep Aphiwat–Taling Chan	Commuter rail	SRT	SRT Electrified Train	3	15.2 km	9.4 mi	Metre gauge	2021	–			

====== Under construction ======
Line			Route	Type	Owner	Operator	Stations	Length		Gauge	Start	Completion	Status			
Line			Route	Type	Owner	Operator	Stations	km	mi	Gauge	Start	Completion	Status			
Line			MRT		Pink Line	Muang Thong Thani–Lake Muang Thong Thani	Monorail	MRTA	NBM	2	2.8 km	1.7 mi	Guideway beam 30m	2021	2025	Under construction
	Orange Line Eastern Section	Bang Khun Non–Thailand Cultural Centre–Yeak Rom Klao	MRT	Rapid transit	BEM	29	34.1 km	MRTA	21.2 mi	Standard gauge	2017	2028	Under construction			
	Purple Line Southern Section	Tao Poon–Kru Nai	MRT	Rapid transit	BEM	17	23.6 km	MRTA	14.7 mi	Standard gauge	2022	2027	Under construction			
ARL		City Line Don Mueang Extension	Phaya Thai–Don Mueang	Airport rail link	SRT	AERA1	1	7.8 km	4.8 mi	Standard gauge	2023	2024	Under construction			
ARL		HSR Line	Suvarnabhumi–U-Tapao	Airport rail link High-speed rail	SRT	AERA1	6	183.6 km	114.1 mi	Standard gauge	2023	2029	Under construction			

====== Planned ======
Line			Route	Type	Owner	Stations	Length		Gauge	Status			
Line			Route	Type	Owner	Stations	km	mi	Gauge	Status			
Line			BTS Skytrain		Sukhumvit Line	Khu Khot–Eastern Outer Ring	Rapid transit	BMA	4	6.5 km	4.0 mi	Standard gauge	Proposed
Kheha–Bang Pu	4	7 km	BTS Skytrain		Sukhumvit Line	4.3 mi	Rapid transit	BMA	Standard gauge	Proposed			
	Silom Line	Bang Wa–Taling Chan	BTS Skytrain	Rapid transit	6	7.50 km	4.66 mi	BMA	Standard gauge	Proposed			
	Silom Line	National Stadium–Yot Se	BTS Skytrain	Rapid transit	1	1.0 km	0.62 mi	BMA	Standard gauge	Proposed			
MRT		Blue Line Western Extension	Lak Song–Phutthamonthon Sai 4	Rapid transit	MRTA	4	8.0 km	5.0 mi	Standard gauge	Proposed			
MRT		Orange Line Western Extension	Thailand Cultural Centre–Bang Khun Non	Rapid transit	MRTA	12	17.5 km	10.9 mi	Standard gauge	Proposed			
MRT		Brown Line	Nonthaburi Civic Center–Lam Sali	Monorail	MRTA	21	22.0 km	13.7 mi	Standard gauge	Proposed			
SRT		Dark Red Line	Krung Thep Aphiwat–Hua Lamphong	Commuter rail	SRT	5	6.9 km	4.3 mi	Metre gauge	Proposed			
SRT		Dark Red Line	Rangsit–Thammasat	Commuter rail	SRT	4	8.84 km	5.49 mi	Metre gauge	Cabinet approval			
SRT		Dark Red Line	Hua Lamphong–Bang Bon	Commuter rail	SRT	8	13.18 km	8.19 mi	Metre gauge	Proposed			
SRT		Dark Red Line	Bang Bon–Maha Chai	Commuter rail	SRT	12	21.00 km	13.05 mi	Metre gauge	Proposed			
SRT		Light Red Line	Krung Thep Aphiwat–Hua Mak	Commuter rail	SRT	6	25.9 km	16.1 mi	Metre gauge	Proposed			
SRT		Light Red Line	Taling Chan–Sala Ya	Commuter rail	SRT	6	12.98 km	8.07 mi	Metre gauge	Cabinet approval			
SRT		Light Red Line	Taling Chan–Siriraj	Commuter rail	SRT	3	5.38 km	3.34 mi	Metre gauge	Cabinet approval			
BMA		Grey Line	Vatcharapol–Rama 9 Bridge	Monorail	BMA	21	26.0 km	16.2 mi	Standard gauge	Proposed			
BMA		Silver Line	Bang Na–Suvarnabhumi	Light rail	BMA	14	24.0 km	14.9 mi	Standard gauge	Proposed			

===== Tram =====
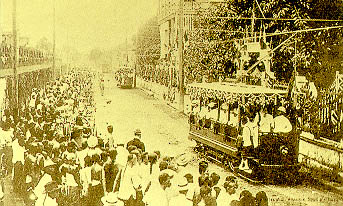
Trams in Bangkok, 1905

The first tram in Bangkok was introduced in 1888 by a Danish company under government concession. Initially, horse-drawn trams were used, but in 1894, the system was electrified, making Bangkok the first city in Asia to have an electric tram system. By 1903, the system carried approximately 10 million passengers annually. However, the tram service ceased on 11 October 1968, after 80 years of operation, in order to make room for automobile traffic.

A short-lived tram service operated in Lopburi between 1955 and 1962.

==== Rail transport in other provinces ====
Currently, Bangkok is the only city in Thailand that has urban rail transit. However, other major cities in the country are planning to implement light rail projects to address their growing urban transport challenges. These include Phuket, Phitsanulok, Chiang Mai, Khon Kaen, and Nakhon Ratchasima. Pattaya is also planning a light rail project which is currently under a public consultation process. The project will also link to the Don Mueang–Suvarnabhumi–U-Tapao high-speed railway.

=== Airport Automated People Mover ===
The Suvarnabhumi Airport Automated People Mover is an automatic people mover in Suvarnabhumi Airport, first opened for service on 28 September 2023, running between the main terminal building and Satellite-1 terminal (SAT-1), with a distance of 1 kilometer. Currently, there is only one service in Suvarnabhumi Airport.

=== High-speed rail ===
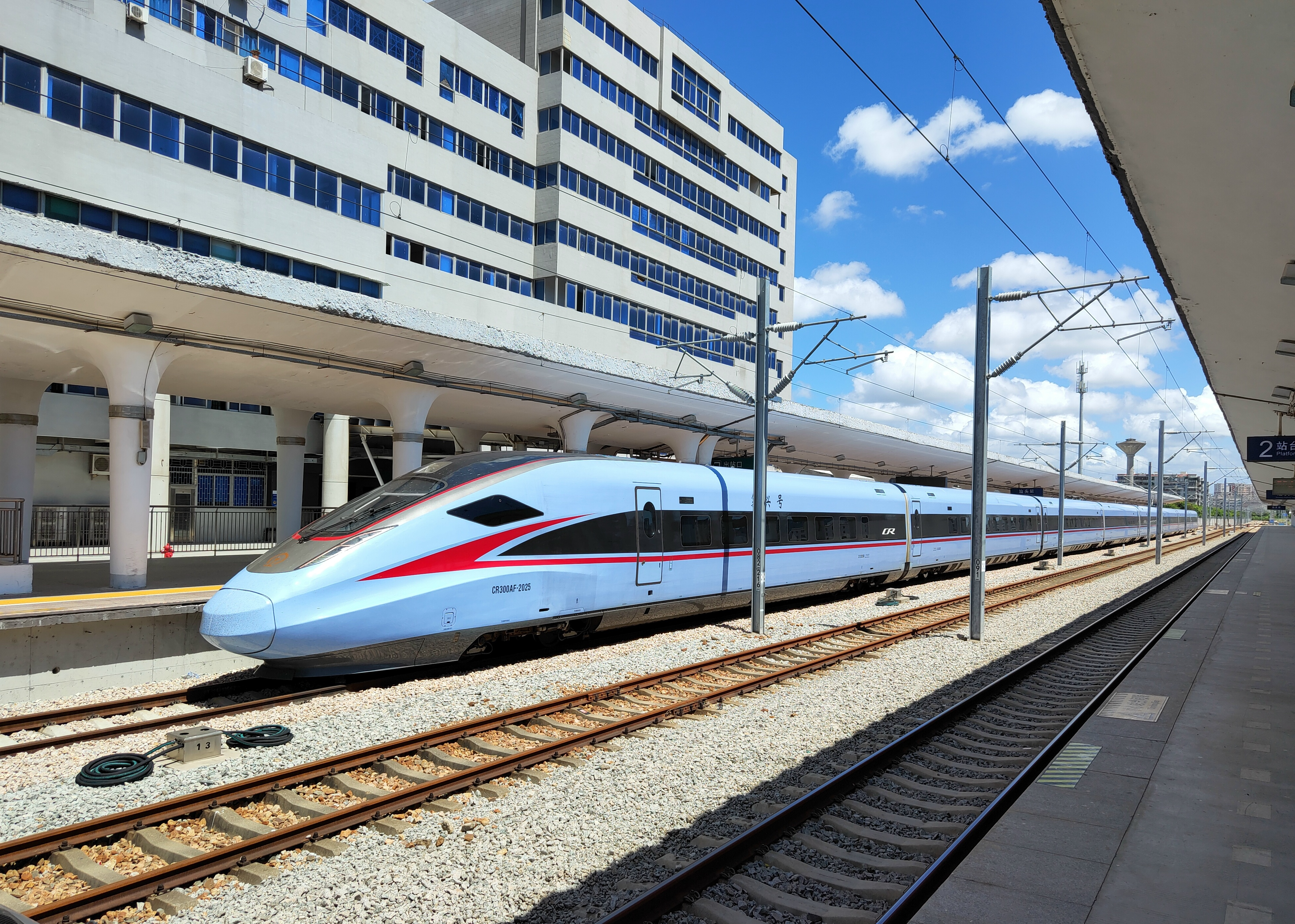
The Fuxing Hao CR300AF will be used on the Northeastern Line from Bangkok to Nong Khai, with an operating speed of 250 km/h.

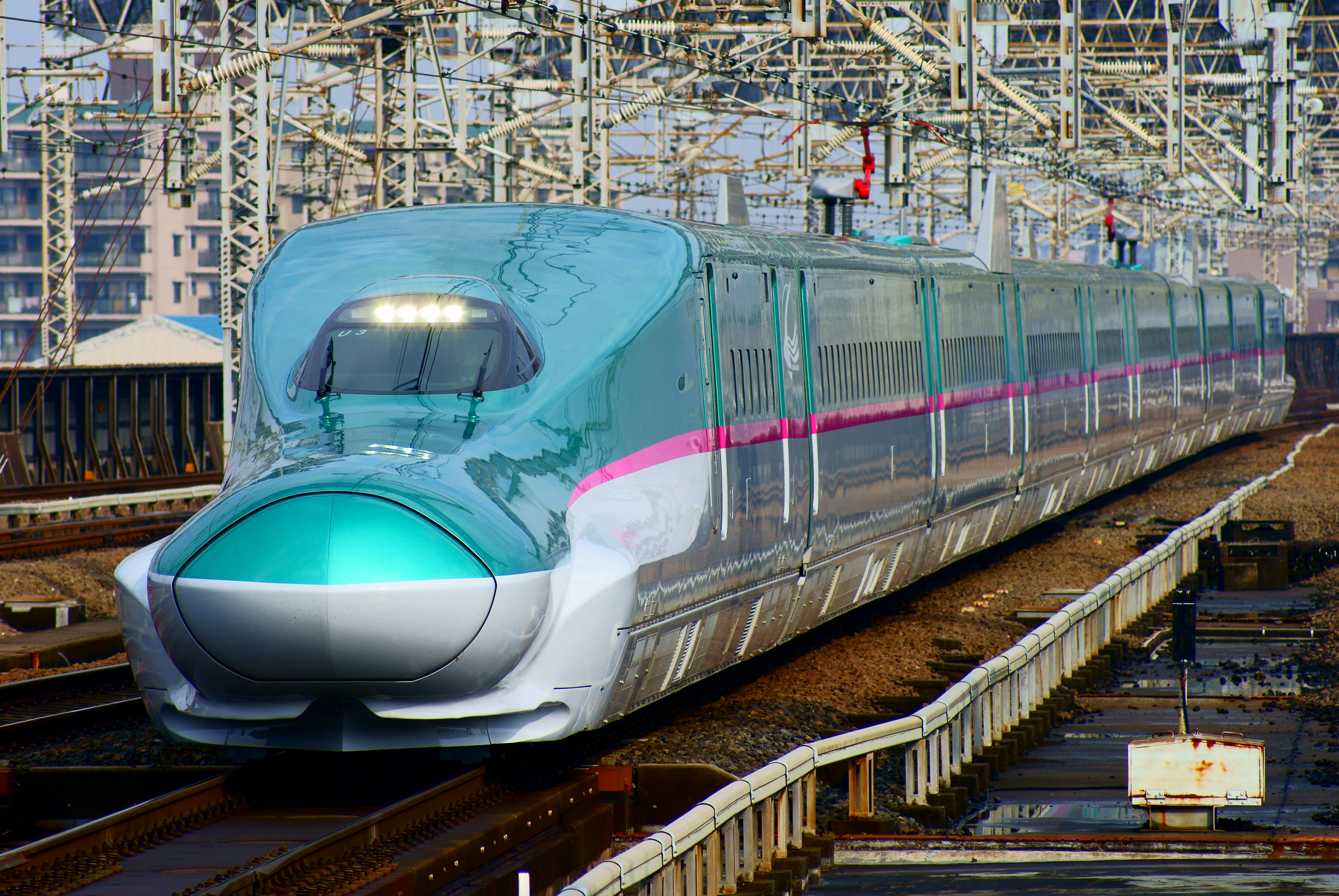
Shinkansen trains capable of reaching a maximum speed of 300 km/h will be used on the Northern Line from Bangkok to Chiang Mai.

While there is currently no high-speed rail in Thailand, The State Railway of Thailand has carried out a high-speed rail project to connect different regions of the country in order to improve inter-regional travel, promote economic growth, and enhance trade markets between countries. The project comprises four lines that cover all regions of the country: the northern, eastern, northeastern, and southern. The project has been divided into three phases: urgent, medium, and long-term. In the urgent phase, which includes 4 routes covering a total of 1,208 kilometers, the focus is on developing three main lines: the Northeastern Line from Bangkok to Nakhon Ratchasima, which second section will be extended to Nong Khai; the Eastern Line from Don Mueang to U-Tapao; and the Northern Line from Bangkok to Phitsanulok. The medium phase, covering 3 routes and a total of 689 kilometers, aims to connect the Southern Line from Bangkok to Hua Hin, the Eastern Line from Rayong to Trat, and the Northern Line from Phitsanulok to Chiang Mai. In the long-term phase, covering 2 routes and a total of 759 kilometers, the plan is to further extend the Southern Line, first from Hua Hin to Surat Thani and then further to Padang Besar.

The Bangkok-Nong Khai route, which covers a distance of 606 kilometers, is a joint venture project between Thailand and China that started in 2014. However, in 2016, the Thai government decided to fully finance and operate the construction of entire project itself, and China is now assisting in the civil works. The construction of the project commenced on 21 December 2017. The first section of the project, from Bangkok to Nakhon Ratchasima, is currently under construction and expected to be completed in 2026, while the second section, from Nakhon Ratchasima to Nong Khai, is scheduled to begin construction in 2023, both of which are part of the urgent phase.

The Don Mueang-Suvarnabhumi-U-Tapao route, connecting three major airports over a distance of 220 kilometers, signed a joint venture agreement on 24 October 2019. The agreement was signed with Eastern High-Speed Rail Linking Three Airports, a consortium led by The Charoen Pokphand (CP) and consisting of Italian-Thai Development, China Railway Construction Corporation, CH. Karnchang, and Bangkok Expressway and Metro. In September 2021, the consortium changed its name to Asia Era One, which will operate the route. Construction is expected to begin in 2023, with the second section to Trat included as part of the medium phase of the project.

The Bangkok-Chiang Mai route spans 688 kilometers, is a joint effort between Thailand and Japan since the signing of a Memorandum of Cooperation (MOC) in 2015. The project has been divided into two phases: urgent and medium. The urgent phase includes the first section connecting Bangkok to Phitsanulok, for which a feasibility study has been conducted by the Japan International Cooperation Agency (JICA) since 2017. On 8 March 2023, JICA completed an economic and financial feasibility study which analyzed the direct and indirect benefits of the project. The study found that the project is worth investing in, with an economic return (EIRR) of 17.3 percent, 12 percent higher than the threshold, and a positive net present value (NPV) over the period of operation. Japan has suggested using Shinkansen trains, which are capable of reaching a maximum speed of 300 km/h. The medium phase will include the second section connecting Phitsanulok to Chiang Mai.

The Bangkok-Padang Besar route spans 759 kilometers and is divided into three sections and two phases. The medium phase includes the Bangkok-Hua Hin section, which is the first section of the route. The long-term phase includes the second section from Hua Hin to Surat Thani and the third section extending to Padang Besar. All of which are currently being prepared for study.

Line		Route	Operator	Stations	Operation Speed		Length		Gauge	Start	Completion	Status		
Line		Route	Operator	Stations	km	mph	km	mi	Gauge	Start	Completion	Status		
Line		Northeastern Line	First Section	Krung Thep Aphiwat–Nakhon Ratchasima	State Railway of Thailand	6	250 km/h	160 mph	253 km	157 mi	Standard gauge	2017	2027	Under construction
Second Section	Nakhon Ratchasima–Nong Khai	Northeastern Line	State Railway of Thailand	5	250 km/h	160 mph	355 km	221 mi	Standard gauge	–	2029	Cabinet approval		
Eastern Line	First Section	Don Mueang–Suvarnabhumi Airport–U-Tapao	AERA1	15	250 km/h	160 mph	220 km	140 mi	Standard gauge	2023	2029	Under construction		
Eastern Line	Second Section	Rayong–Chanthaburi–Trat	State Railway of Thailand	4	250 km/h	160 mph	190 km	120 mi	Standard gauge	–	2028	Reviewing suitability study report.		
Northern Line	First Section	Krung Thep Aphiwat–Phitsanulok	State Railway of Thailand	7	250 km/h 300 km/h	160 mph 190 mph	380 km	240 mi	Standard gauge	–	2029	Currently considering project format/design.		
Northern Line	Second Section	Phitsanulok–Chiang Mai	State Railway of Thailand	5	250 km/h 300 km/h	160 mph 190 mph	288 km	179 mi	Standard gauge	–	2029	Reviewing suitability study report.		
Southern Line	First Section	Krung Thep Aphiwat–Hua Hin	State Railway of Thailand	5	250 km/h	160 mph	211 km	131 mi	Standard gauge	–	2032	Budgeting for study review		
Southern Line	Second Section	Hua Hin–Surat Thani	State Railway of Thailand	3			424 km	263 mi	Standard gauge	–	2032	Currently preparing for a study		
Southern Line	Third Section	Surat Thani–Padang Besar	State Railway of Thailand	3			335 km	208 mi	Standard gauge	–	2044	Currently preparing for a study		

=== Rail links to adjacent countries ===
- Malaysia - yes - same 1,000 mm (3 ft 3 3/8 in) gauge
- Laos - yes - 1,000 mm (3 ft 3 3/8 in) gauge across Mekong River on Thai-Lao Friendship Bridge
- Cambodia - yes - same 1,000 mm (3 ft 3 3/8 in) gauge
- Myanmar - no - defunct - (see Death Railway). But projected extension will rebuild the route.

== Rolling stock ==
=== Locomotives ===
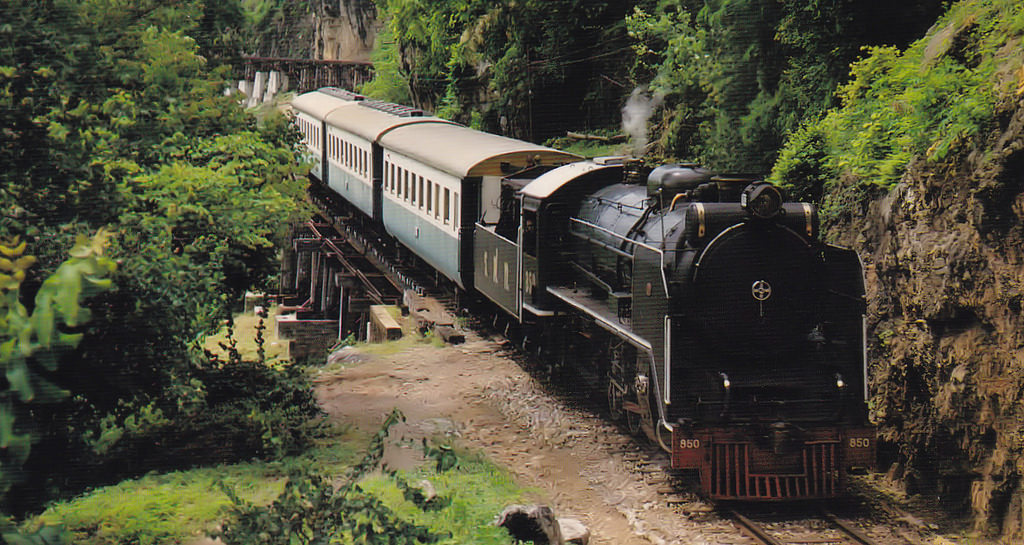
The Japanese Pacific steam locomotive, numbered 850, was leading a train on the Death Railway line, passing through the Krasae Cave in Kanchanaburi province, Thailand, during the year 1998.

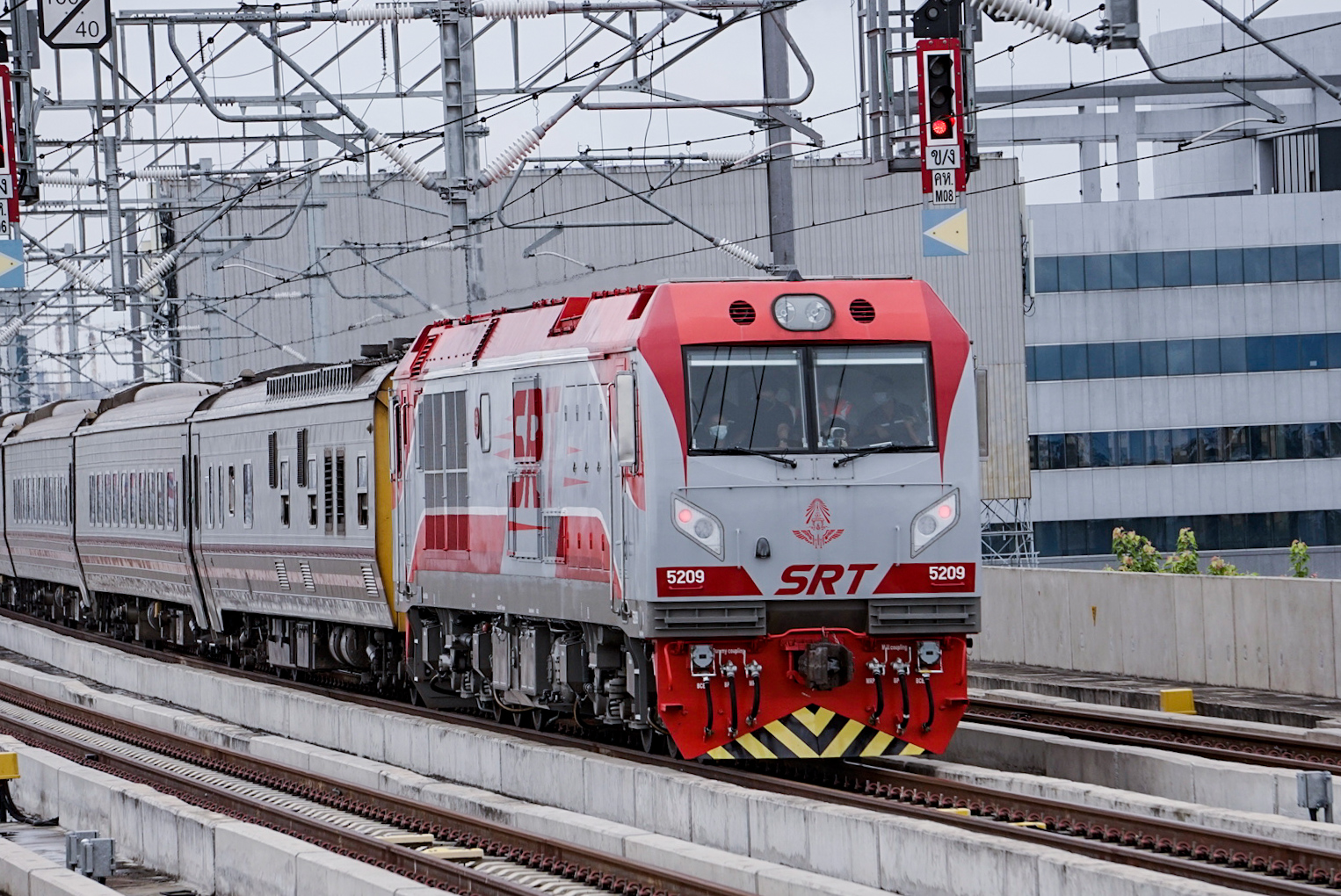
CDA5B1, a diesel-electric locomotives from CRRC Qishuyan that will replace decade-old locomotives.

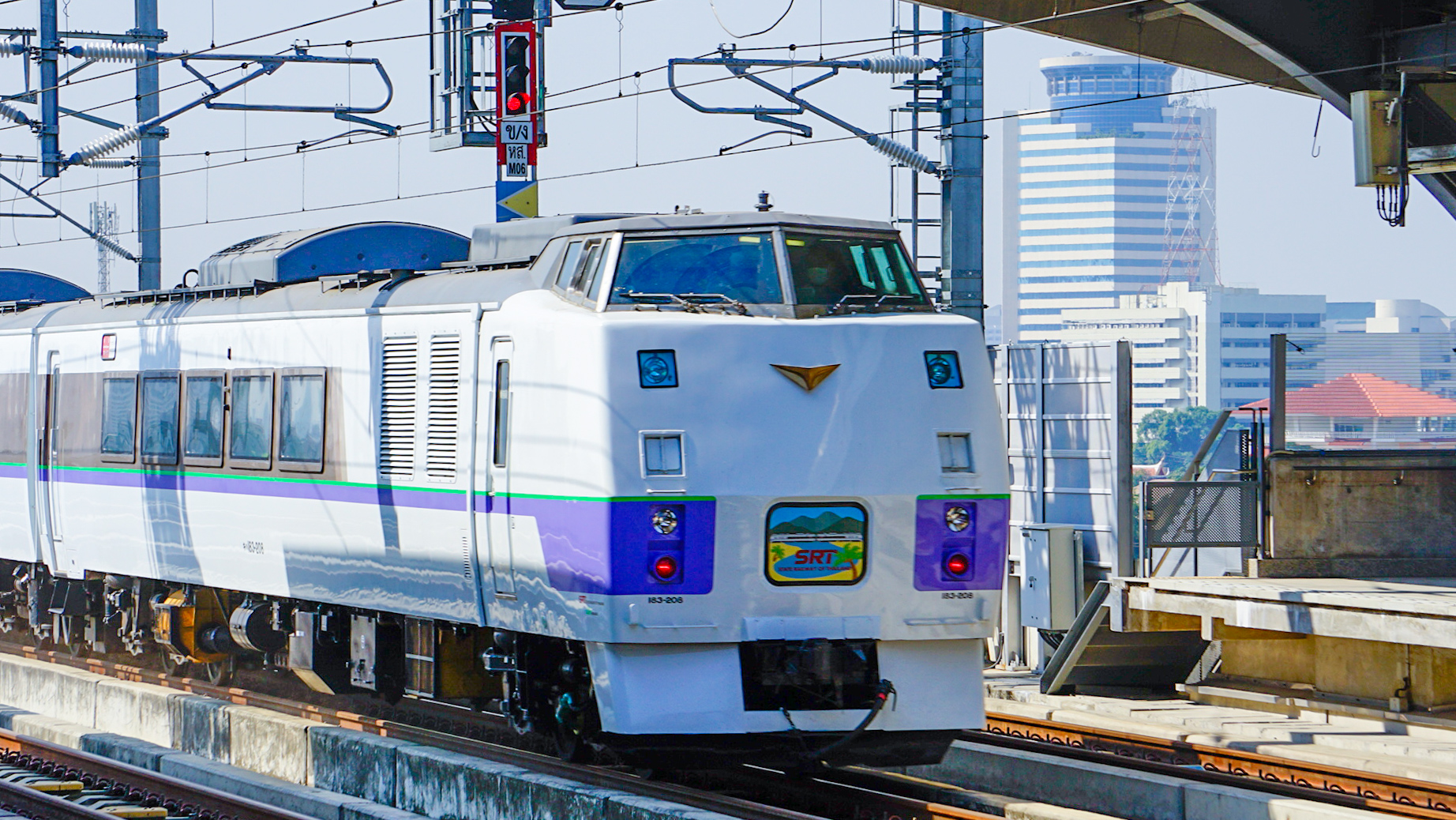
KiHa 183 series, a diesel multiple units donated by JR Hokkaido

The State Railway of Thailand (SRT) operates both diesel and electric locomotives for long-distance passenger and freight train transportation. The SRT also reserves steam locomotives for special services only, such as the SRT Class Japanese Mikado (DX50), JNR Class C56, and SRT Class Japanese Pacific (CX50), which are used on special excursion services on specific days. The first steam locomotive was used in 1893, and in 1961, the SRT established a railway museum to preserve and display steam locomotives.

In 2020, the SRT procured 50 diesel-electric locomotives, model CDA5B1, from CRRC Qishuyan. These locomotives have a top speed of 120 kilometers per hour for passenger trains and 70 kilometers per hour for freight trains. Weighing 16 tons per axle, the CDA5B1 locomotives are equipped with modern safety features, including an Automatic Train Protection (ATP) system and closed-circuit television (CCTV) cameras that also produce low emissions and are fully compatible with the European Train Control System (ETCS) level 1. The first 20 units were delivered on 4 February 2022, and another 30 units delivered in February 2023. They will be allocated for use in towing convoys of passenger and freight trains throughout the country., which will increase the efficiency of train operations and support the opening of the double-track railway during 2023–2024, replacing the aging engines that have been in service for almost half a century.

In December 2021, the SRT received 17 air-conditioned KiHa 183 series diesel multiple unit trains from JR Hokkaido, paying only for shipping. These trains, consisting of four sets with four vans and a backup car each, offer a total of 216 seats per train and can travel up to 110 kilometers per hour. They feature facilities for tourists, including air conditioning, reclining seats, and closed-system bathrooms. Currently, the trains are utilized for one-day travel routes, and all 17 units are expected to be operational by the end of 2023.

The SRT has collaborated with King Mongkut's Institute of Technology Ladkrabang (KMITL) and Energy Absolute (EA) to develop a locally made battery-electric locomotive prototype under the "EV on Train" project. The prototype was finalized in 2022, and the SRT plans to produce three more battery locomotives and procure another 50 from other sources this year to replace its aging fleet of diesel engines. By the end of 2023, Thailand is expected to have around 54 battery-powered trains, with four of them being domestically produced. This effort aligns with the government's commitment to reduce greenhouse gas emissions by 25% by 2030.

=== Electric multiple units ===
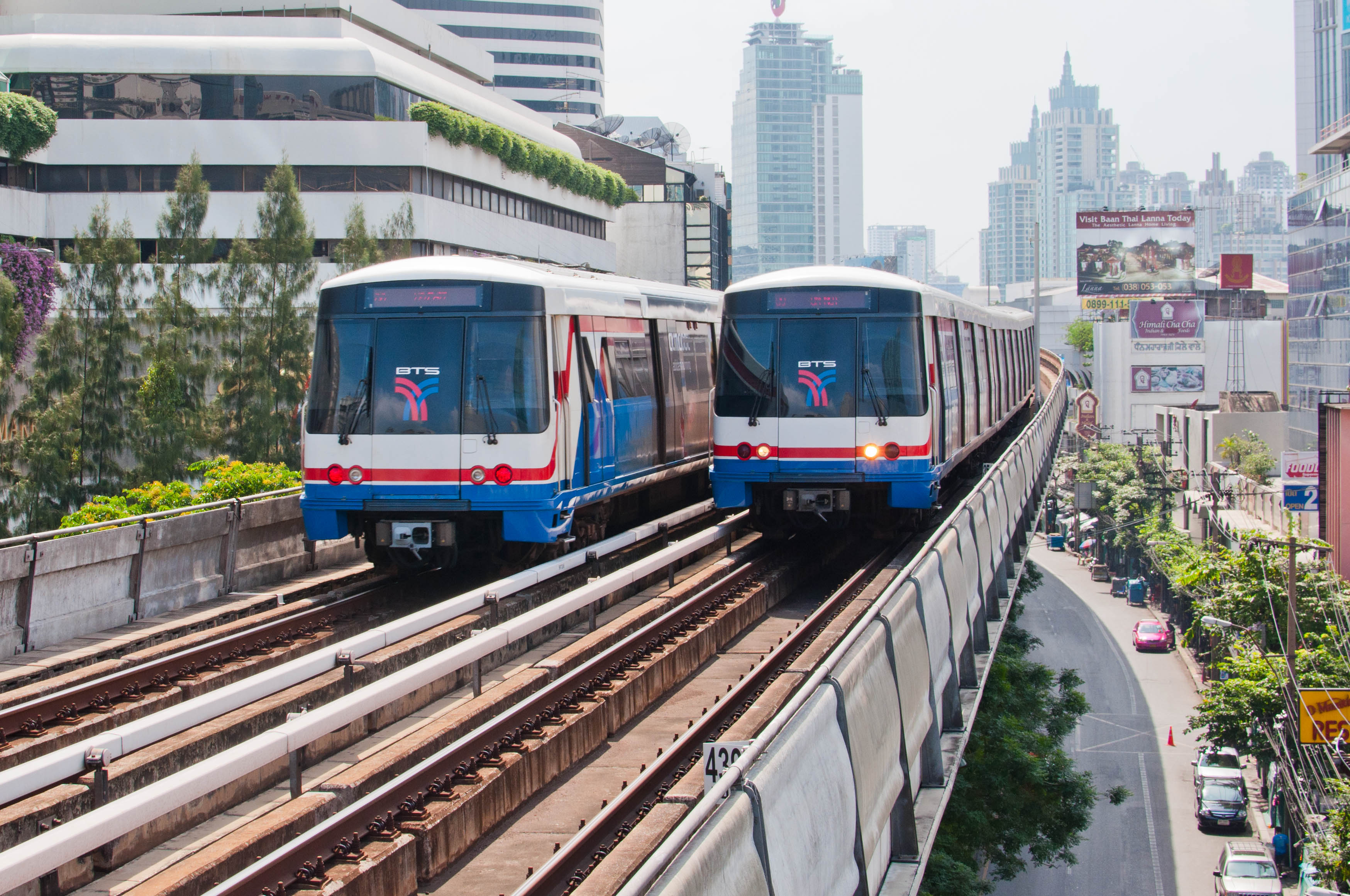
The Siemens Modular Metro is used on both the Silom Line and Sukhumvit Line of the BTS Skytrain, as well as on the Blue Line of the MRT system.

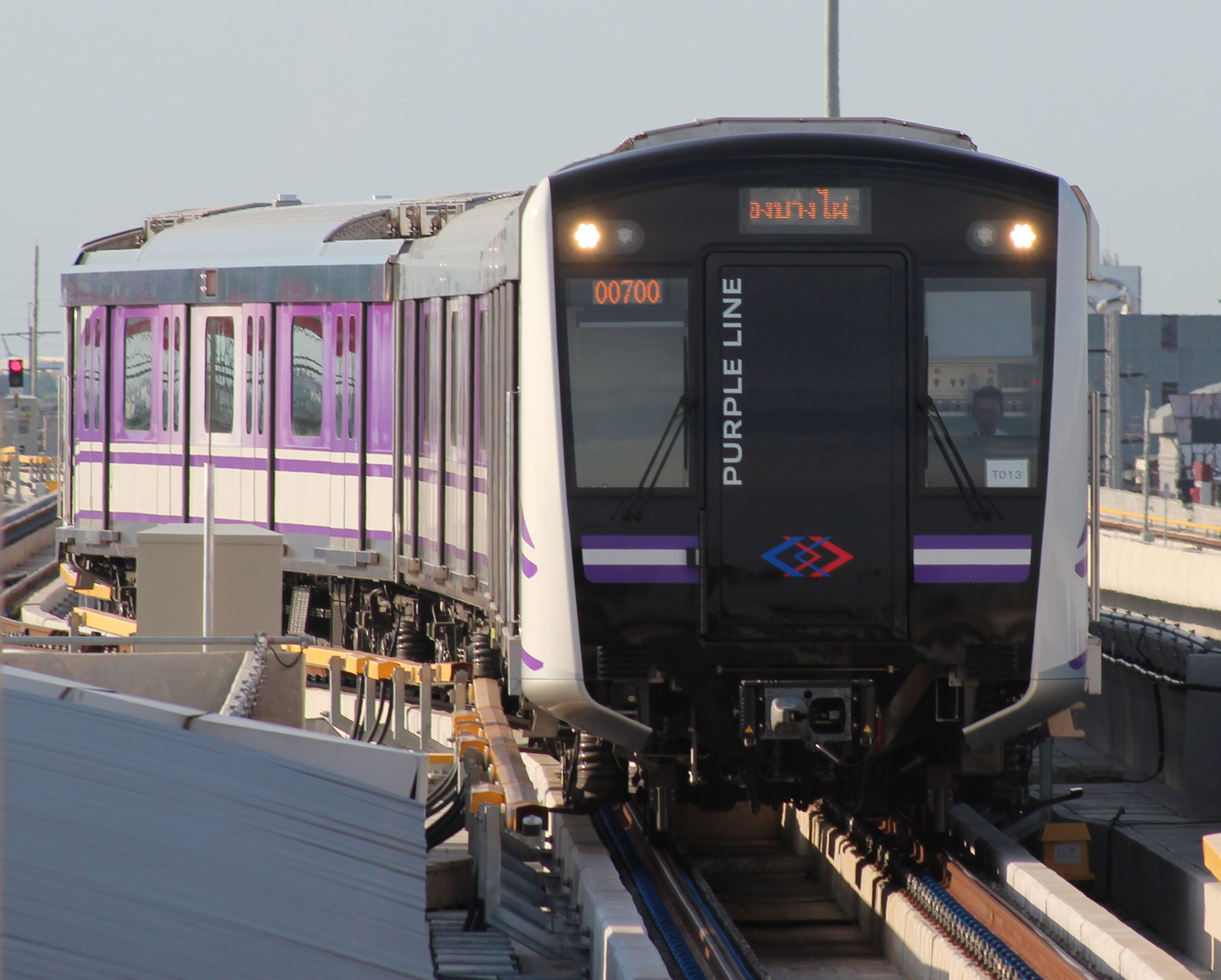
J-TREC Sustina S24m are operating on the Purple Line.

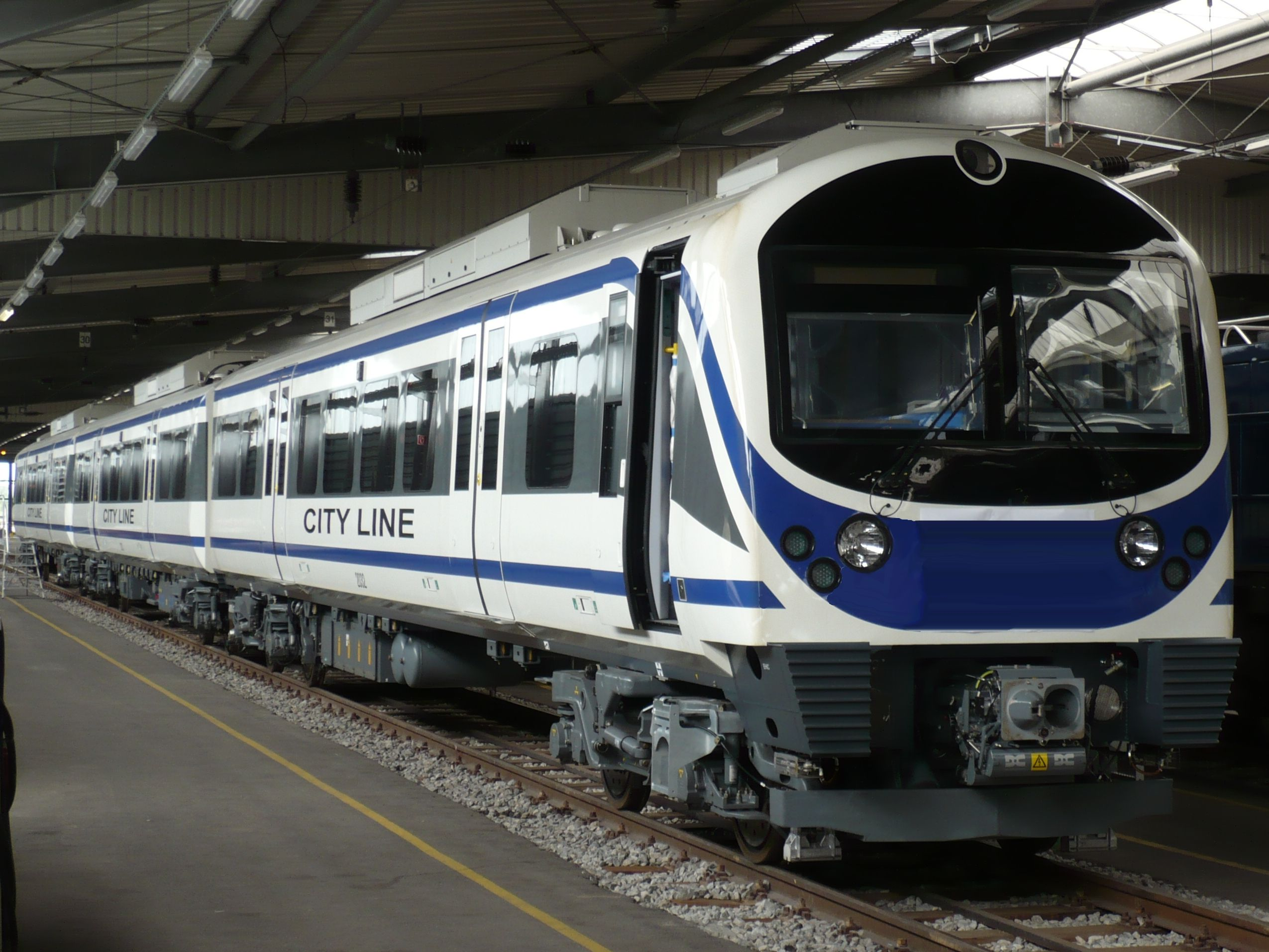
The Siemens Desiro, a type of electric multiple unit train that is used on the Airport Rail Link

Electric multiple units (EMUs) are the primary type of rolling stock used in Bangkok's rapid transit systems due to their environmental sustainability and efficiency. These trains can draw power from both overhead wires and third rails, allowing them to provide rapid and reliable service to passengers. EMUs are used by different rapid transit systems in Bangkok, each with its unique features.

The BTS Skytrain uses a variety of electric multiple units (EMUs) including the Siemens Modular Metro, Siemens Bozankaya, and CRRC Changchun. The Siemens Modular Metro, which operates on the Silom and Sukhumvit Lines, was first introduced in 1999. The newer Siemens Bozankaya model, introduced in 2018, features advanced safety and energy-saving features such as regenerative braking and a lightweight design. Both models have an air-conditioning system that responds to weather conditions, high temperatures, and humidity levels. They also utilize interior and exterior LED lights to reduce maintenance costs and energy consumption.

The MRT system uses Siemens Modular Metro and Siemens Bozankaya EMUs on its Blue Line. Meanwhile, the J-TREC Sustina S24 EMUs are used exclusively on the Purple Line and feature a lightweight stainless steel design, making them more energy-efficient and reducing maintenance costs.

The Red Lines commuter rail employs the Hitachi AT100, which is capable of reaching a maximum speed of 160 km/h. The train's electric car design incorporates Aluminum Plate and Aluminum Extrusion materials. The State Railway of Thailand awarded the Red Line Project contract to Hitachi, Mitsubishi Heavy Industries, and Sumitomo Corporation on 30 March 2016. The first and second completed rolling stocks for the project were shipped out from Hitachi Kasado Works in Kudamatsu, Yamaguchi Prefecture in September 2019. Hitachi was contracted to ship a total of 25 train sets, comprising 130 rolling stock units, by the end of June 2020.

Siemens Desiro EMUs are utilized by the Airport Rail Link. A total of nine Siemens Desiro sets were purchased, with five three-car trains operating the city services and four trainsets with a fourth car designated for check-in baggage handling the express services. The first trains were shipped from Germany in September 2007, and testing was initiated in Bangkok in March 2008.

=== Monorail ===
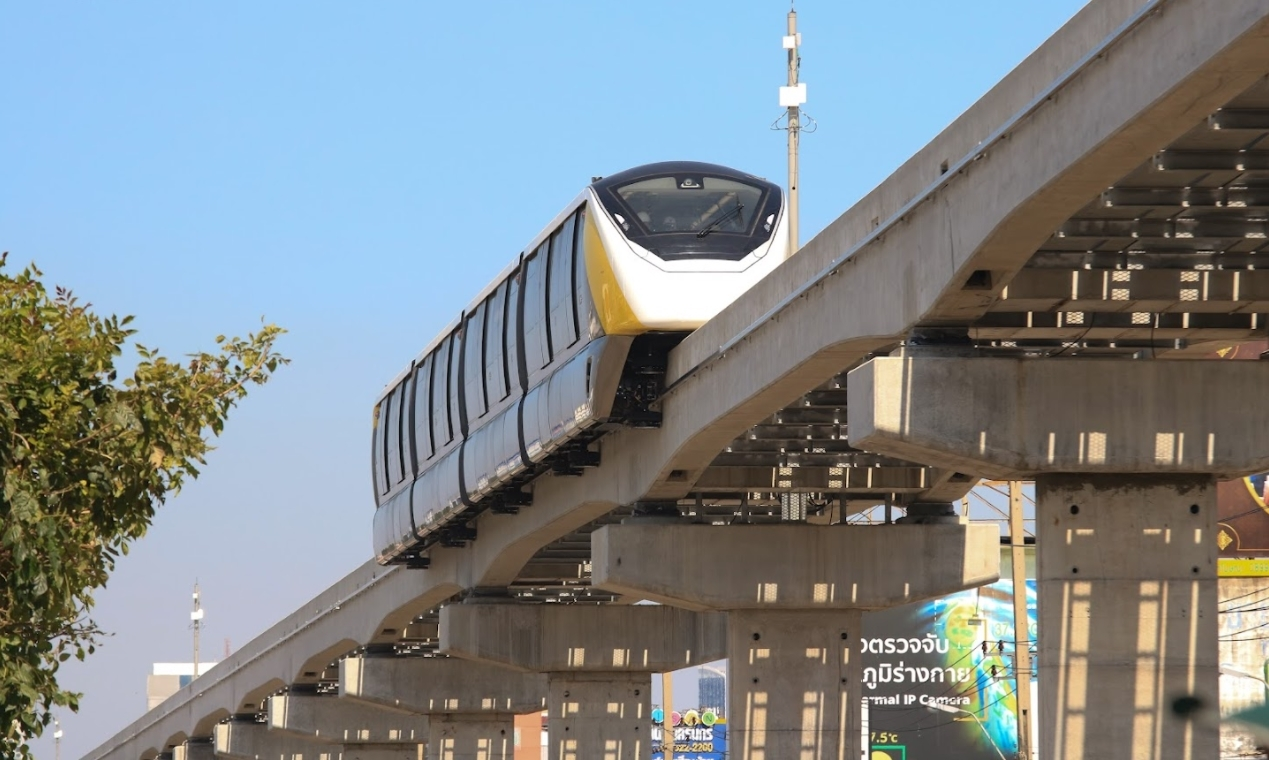
Innovia Monorail 300 systems, will be operating on Yellow Line and Pink Line

Monorail will be used for a secondary mass transit system in Bangkok, designed to feed passengers into the main line. The Pink Line and Yellow Line are two such systems, with a total of 42 Innovia Monorail 300 model trains. The first branch of trains arrived in Thailand on 28 September 2020, and the second branch arrived in November 2020. The trains are controlled by an unmanned CITYFLO 650 signaling system, and inside the cabin of the train, there are safety equipment such as CCTV cameras, smoke detectors, and communication buttons for passengers to interact with car operators.

=== People mover ===
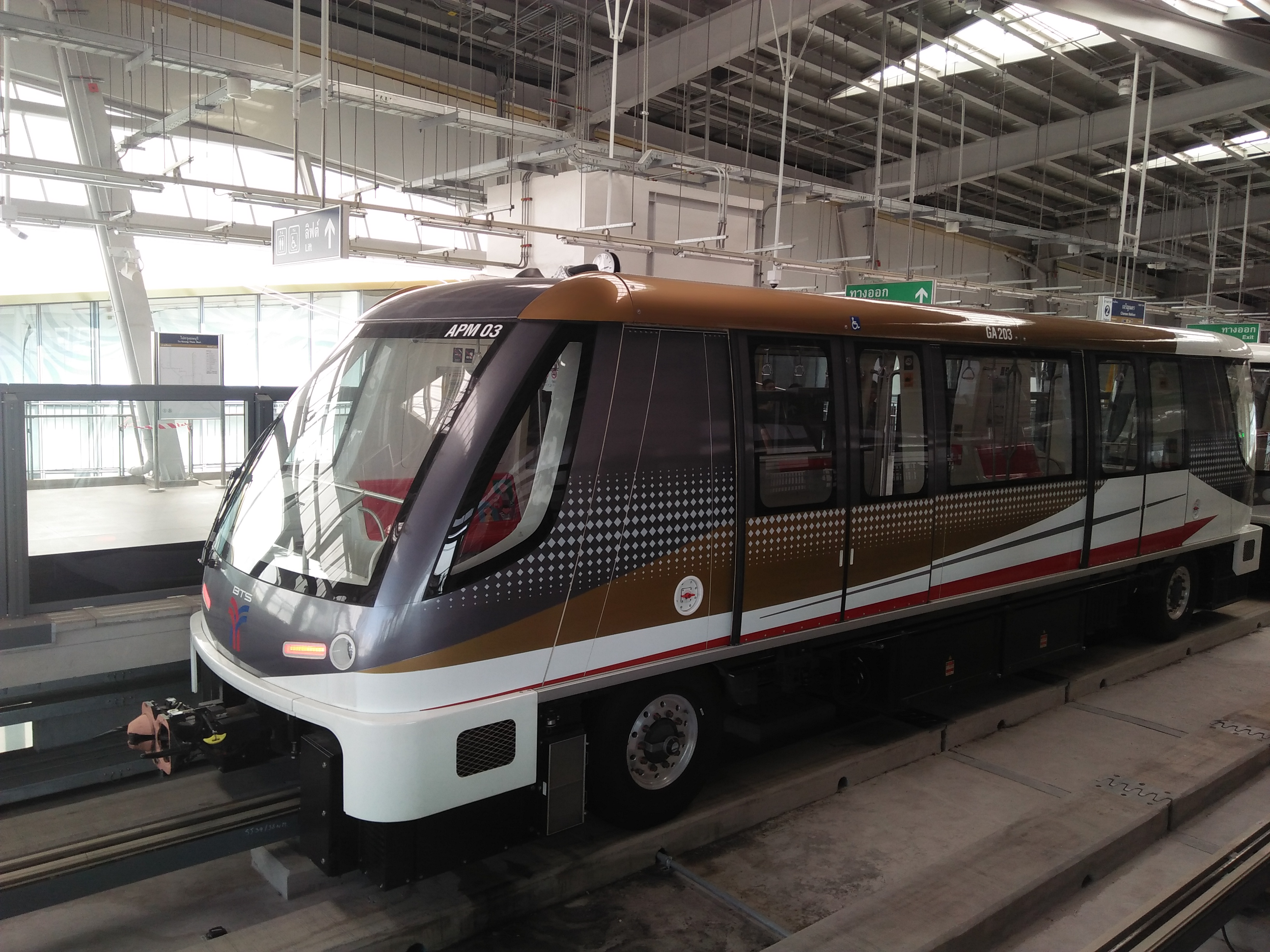
Innovia APM 300 systems are operating on Gold Line

The Innovia APM 300 is the only people mover currently in operation on Bangkok's Gold Line, introduced in June 2020. It uses a central rail-guided system and rubber tires, offering passengers a smooth and noiseless ride. This unmanned electric vehicle can reach speeds of up to 80 km/h. On the other hand, the Siemens AirVal model arrived in Thailand in July 2020 and is set to commence operations on the Suvarnabhumi Airport Automated People Mover at Suvarnabhumi Airport's terminals in September 2023. This model has the capacity to transport up to 3,590 passengers per hour and direction during peak periods, operating 24/7 to accommodate varying demand. It also features spacious aisles and large doors, making it easy for passengers to board and disembark, and providing ample room for luggage.

=== High-speed trains ===
Thailand's first high-speed train service on the Northeastern Line, connecting Bangkok to Nong Khai, will be powered by the Fuxing Hao CR300, which is expected to arrive in 2024. The service will operate on a double-track designed for high-speed travel, with an operating speed of 250 km/h. Each of the six trains will feature eight passenger cars, offering a total of 594 seats, including 96 first-class seats and 498 standard-class seats. Meanwhile, on the Northern Line connecting Bangkok to Chiang Mai, Japan has suggested employing Shinkansen trains, which can reach a maximum speed of 300 km/h.

== Infrastructure ==
=== Tracks ===
Thailand's railway tracks come in two types: metre gauge and standard gauge. The majority of railway tracks in the country use metre gauge, but in Bangkok, the Mass Rapid Transit System operates on standard gauge tracks, with the exception of the Red Lines, which are electrified and run on metre gauge tracks. As of 2020, the total length of metre gauge tracks in Thailand, excluding the Red Lines, is 4,814.862 km. This includes 3,326.230 km of single tracks, 1,103.192 km of double tracks, 320.157 km of triple tracks, and 65.283 km of separated tracks on the Maeklong Railway.

The Mass Rapid Transit System in Bangkok consists of several lines, with most of the tracks being standard gauge. As of 2022, the total length of standard gauge tracks in the system, excluding the Red Line, is 170.438 km. The Red Lines include the Dark Red Line, which is 26.30 km long, and the Light Red Line, which is 15.26 km long, and both are electrified and run on metre gauge tracks.

=== Railway stations ===
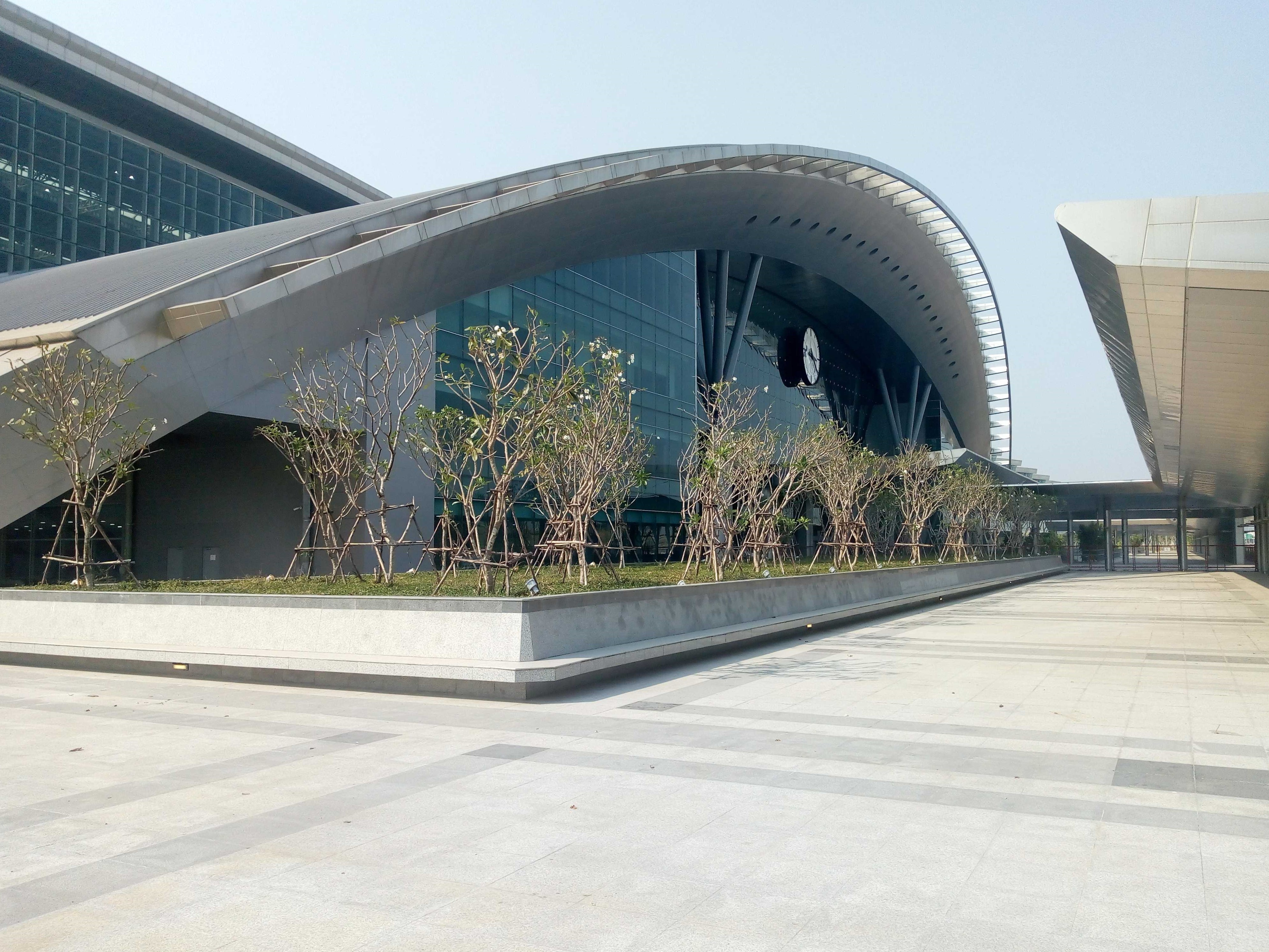
Krung Thep Aphiwat Central Terminal, the current central rail transportation hubs in Thailand.

There are approximately 650 open railway stations and halts in Thailand, with the Krung Thep Aphiwat Central Terminal being the largest in both Thailand and Southeast Asia. The terminal covers an area over 270,000 square meters and has three floors, as well as a mezzanine and an underground level. It serves up to 800,000 passengers per day and has replaced the Bangkok (Hua Lamphong) railway station, as the primary rail transportation hub. The name Krung Thep Aphiwat Central Terminal was bestowed by King Rama X, signifying the prosperity of Krung Thep, which is the official name of Bangkok. The station has 24 platforms, including 10 for high-speed rail, 2 for the Airport Rail Link, 8 for inter-city rail, and 4 for Red Lines. It is also linked to the Blue Line

To further improve the station's accessibility and convenience for all passengers, including those with disabilities and the elderly, a double-track railway project is currently underway. The project will apply universal design principles, making the station more user-friendly and accommodating to everyone.

=== Bridges ===
Thailand's railway system features approximately 1,000 bridges, varying in size from small overpasses to large viaducts. One noteworthy construction is the railway bridge over the Mae Klong River, which runs parallel to the Chulalongkorn Bridge in Ratchaburi Province. The former railway bridge over the Mae Klong River has been replaced by an extradosed railway bridge, the first of its kind in Thailand. Spanning 340 meters, the bridge includes a 160-meter-long cable-stayed section with a height of 16 meters from the rail ridge to the top of the cable-stayed pole. Another remarkable project is the Lopburi-Pak Nam Pho double-track railway, featuring a 19-kilometer-long elevated railway that bypasses Lopburi city, making it Thailand's longest elevated railway.

=== Tunnels ===
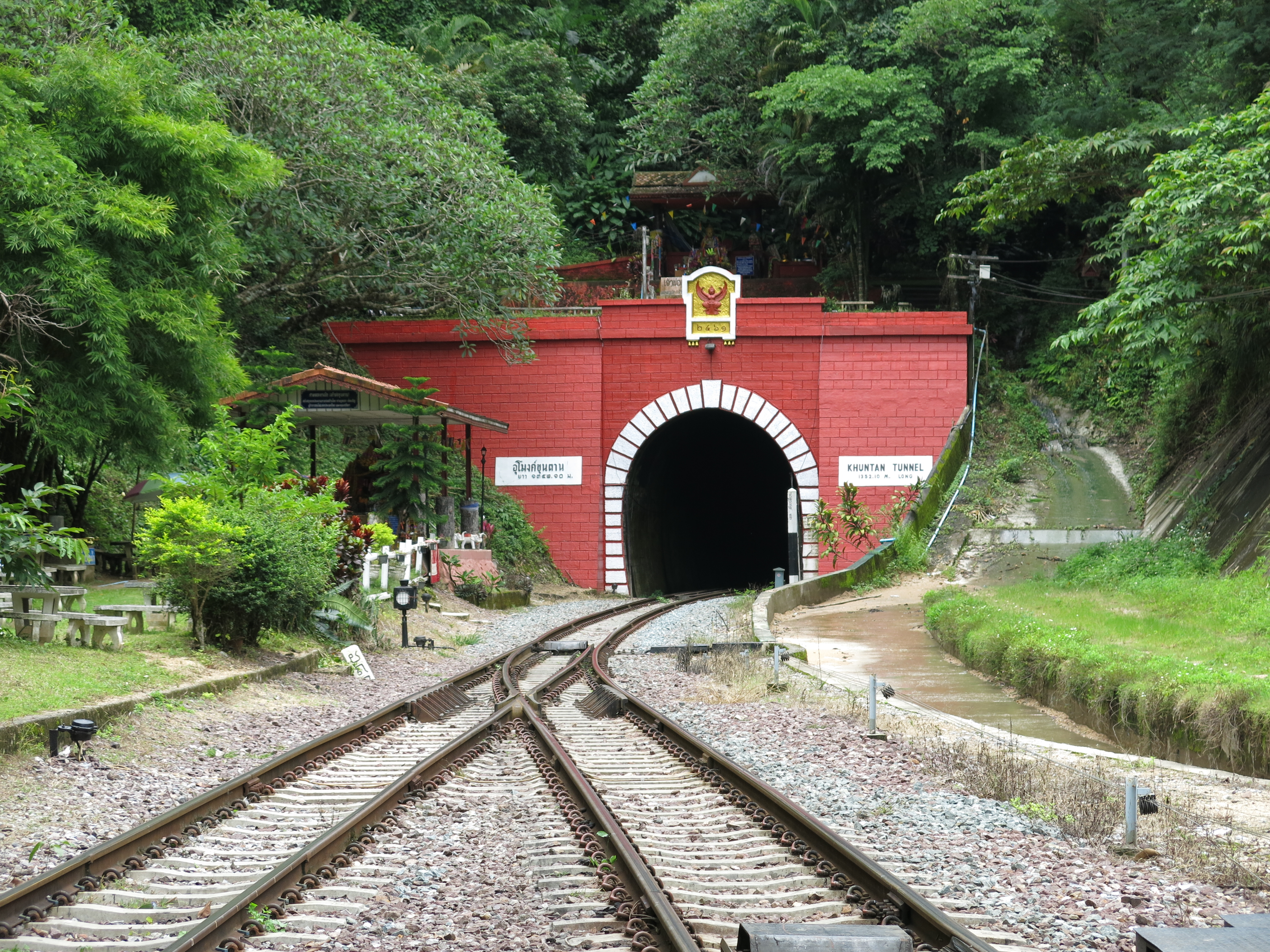
Khun Tan Railway Tunnel once longest railway tunnel in Thailand, from 1925 to 2021

There are currently 8 railway tunnels in Thailand. The Khun Tan Railway Tunnel, measuring 1,352.10 meters, located between Hang Chat District, Lampang Province and Mae Tha District, Lamphun Province, held the title of Thailand's longest railway tunnel for several decades, from 1925 to 2021.

In 2021, the record for the longest railway tunnel in Thailand was surpassed by the construction of the Dong Phaya Yen Railway Tunnel, which spans a distance of 5.85 kilometers between Map Kabao Station, Pha Sadet Station, and Hin Lap Station in Saraburi Province. The Dong Phaya Yen Railway Tunnel is part of the Map Kabao–Thanon Chira Junction double-track railway project and runs through the Dong Phaya Yen Mountains.

=== Level crossings ===
As of 2022, there are 2,630 level crossings across the country. These crossings are categorized into 195 overpasses, 215 underpasses, 1,409 level crossings with rail barriers, 5 private level crossings, 186 crossings with traffic signs, and 620 illegal crossings. The lack of proper safety features, such as crossing barriers, has resulted in frequent accidents, particularly at the unauthorized crossings created by villagers without authorization from the railway authority. To address this issue, the State Railway of Thailand has implemented a policy to close unauthorized crossings, established 122 safety passages, and constructed overpasses and underpasses in double-track railway project to prevent accidents.

=== Signalling ===
The State Railway of Thailand (SRT) has been pushing upgrades to the signalling system. The new signalling mandate being adopted is the European Train Control System (ETCS), a standard that boosts capacity and increases the reliability of rail networks. Thales, has been supporting SRT's efforts by introducing its ETCS technology since 2017, and has designed, delivered, and installed the ETCS Level 1 Automatic Train Protection (ATP) system covering a total of 48 stations across four sections of track in the Bangkok area. The Cityflo 650 Communications-based train control (CBTC) system, developed by Alstom, has been in use on the Purple and Gold Line, and will be used on the Pink Line and Yellow Line. Meanwhile, the older signalling system is in use on most parts of the rail network, relying on colour light signals, semaphore signals and token signalling.

== See also ==
- Transport in Thailand
- List of rail accidents in Thailand
- Siam Park City Railway
