= Makkasan station =

Makkasan station may refer to:

- Makkasan station (Airport Rail Link)
- Makkasan railway station
