= Mae Nam railway station =

Railway station in Bangkok, Thailand

Mae Nam แม่น้ำ
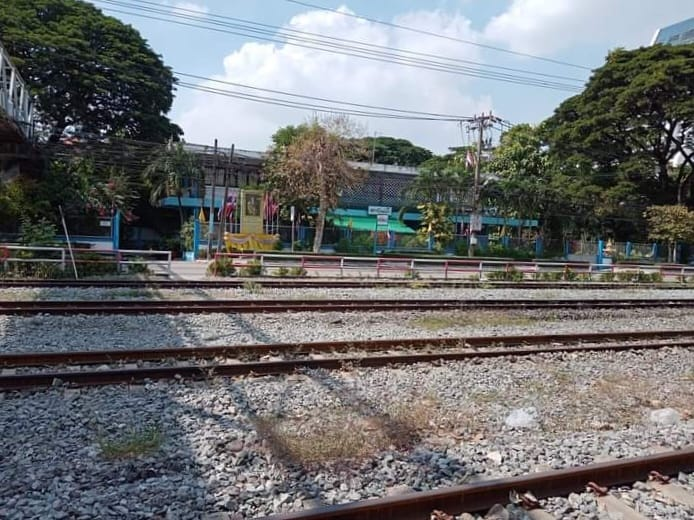

General information
- Location: 1049 Chuea Phloeng Road, Chong Nonsi Subdistrict, Yan Nawa District; Bangkok; Thailand
- Coordinates: 13.713958°N 100.553610°E
- Operator: State Railway of Thailand (SRT)
- Line: Mae Nam Branch
- Platforms: 1
- Tracks: 4

Construction
- Structure type: At-grade

Other information
- Status: Freight
- Station code: มน.
- Classification: Class 1

History
- Opened: 12 October 1970; 55 years ago

Services
Preceding station	State Railway of Thailand	Following station
Makkasan Terminus	Eastern Line Mae Nam Freight Line	Tha Rua Mai towards Bang Chak Oil Refinery
Location

Mae Nam Station (Thai: สถานีแม่น้ำ, pronounced [sā.tʰǎː.nī mɛ̂ːnáːm]) is a railway station of eastern line located in Chong Nonsi Subdistrict, Yan Nawa District, Bangkok's east bank of Chao Phraya River. The station is a special railway station and is located 9.87 km (6.13 mi) from Hua Lamphong railway station and considered to be the next station of Makkasan railway station to south, the distance is about 4.7 km (2.9 mi) and is close to Khlong Toei Port, Khlong Toei Market and Queen Sirikit National Convention Center in Khlong Toei District.

This station is a special station of the State Railway of Thailand (SRT). The station is not used for passenger services. It is a place for transporting cargoes and parcels includes fuels. There is a Chuea Phloeng Road (ถนนเชื้อเพลิง; lit. 'fuel road') between the platform and railway including no station sign like other stations. However, it is possible to book tickets in advance for general passengers. This and Thon Buri railway station are the only stations in Bangkok to use Lever frame Interlocking system.

Moreover, the area around the station is approximately 227 rai (about 89.72 acres). It is considered as a suitable area for many real estate investment projects.
