= Makkasan railway station =

Railway station in Bangkok

Coordinates: 13.7537°N 100.5474°E

Makkasan มักกะสัน

General information
- Location: Makkasan Road, Makkasan Subdistrict, Ratchathewi District; Bangkok; Thailand
- Operator: State Railway of Thailand
- Manager: Ministry of Transport
- Lines: Aranyaprathet Main Line; Mae Nam Branch
- Platforms: 2
- Tracks: 3 (station); 8 (depot)

Construction
- Structure type: At-grade

Other information
- Station code: มส.
- Classification: Class 1

History
- Opened: January 1908; 118 years ago

Services
Preceding station	State Railway of Thailand	Following station
Phaya Thai Halt towards Hua Lamphong	Eastern Line	Asok Halt towards Chuk Samet or Poipet (Cambodia)
Terminus	Eastern Line Mae Nam Freight Line	Mae Nam towards Bang Chak Oil Refinery
Location

Makkasan railway station is a railway station in Makkasan Subdistrict, Ratchathewi District, Bangkok. It is a class 1 railway station 5.171 km (3.2 mi) from Bangkok railway station. The station opened in January 1908 as part of the Eastern Line Bangkok–Chachoengsao Junction section. It is the location of the Makkasan Depot, which opened in 1897 when the railway started operations. Makkasan Depot was destroyed during the Second World War, and was rebuilt using loans from the World Bank.

Despite not having official status as a junction, a freight-only branch line to Mae Nam station, Bangkok Port, and the Bang Chak Oil Refinery branches off from here. A few container and oil trains use the line daily.

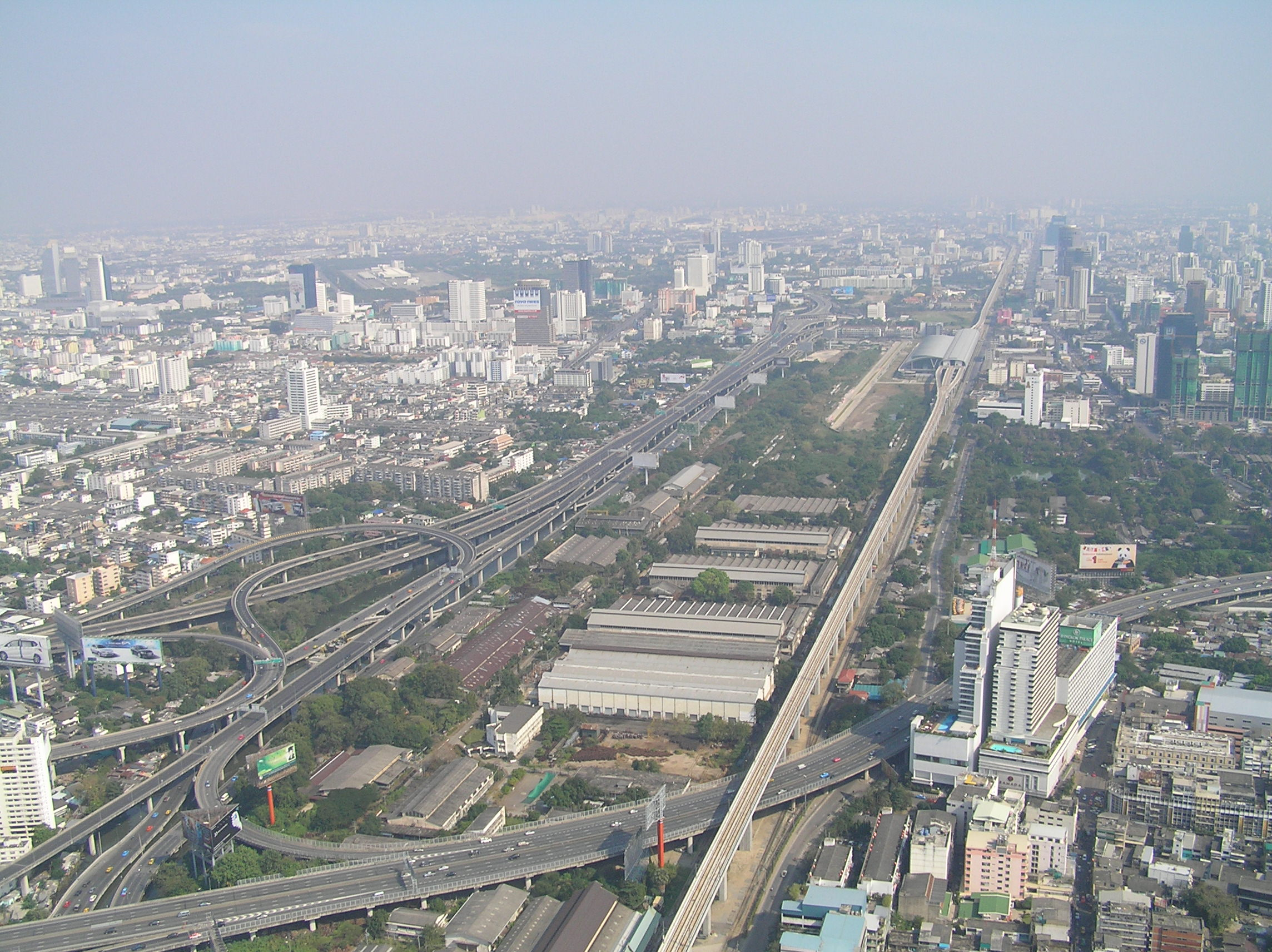
Aerial view of Makkasan railway station (bottom-right structure with red roof next to the Airport Rail Link) and Makkasan depot

== Train services ==
- Ordinary train No. 275/276 Bangkok – Aranyaprathet – Bangkok
- Ordinary train No. 277/278 Bangkok – Kabin Buri – Bangkok
- Ordinary train No. 279/280 Bangkok – Aranyaprathet – Bangkok
- Ordinary train No. 281/282 Bangkok – Kabin Buri – Bangkok
- Ordinary train No. 283/284 (Note: No. 283/284, 383/384, 376/378, 379/380 runs on weekdays only) Bangkok – Ban Phlu Ta Luang – Bangkok
- Ordinary train No. 285/286 (Note: No. 285/286 runs on weekends only) Bangkok – Chachoengsao Junction – Bangkok
- Ordinary train No. 367/368 Bangkok – Chachoengsao Junction – Bangkok
- Ordinary train No. 371/372 Bangkok – Prachin Buri – Bangkok
- Ordinary train No. 376/378 Rangsit – Hua Takhe – Bangkok
- Ordinary train No. 379/380 Bangkok – Hua Takhe – Bangkok
- Ordinary train No. 381/382 (Note: No. 381 runs every one day before the end of a national holiday only) Bangkok – Chachoengsao Junction – Bangkok
- Ordinary train No. 383/384 Bangkok – Chachoengsao Junction – Bangkok
- Ordinary train No. 385/388 (Note: No. 385/386 runs on national working days only) Bangkok – Chachoengsao Junction – Bangkok
- Ordinary train No. 389/390 Bangkok – Chachoengsao Junction – Bangkok
- Ordinary train No. 391/394 (Note: No. 394 runs every one day before the start of a national holiday only) Bangkok – Chachoengsao Junction – Bangkok
