= Don Mueang–Suvarnabhumi–U-Tapao high-speed railway =

Planned high speed rail line in Thailand

Overview
- Status: Under negotiation for termination of the contract
- Locale: Thailand
- Termini: Don Mueang, Bangkok; U-Tapao, Ban Chang, Rayong
- Stations: 9

Service
- Type: High-speed rail
- Operator: Asia Era One Company Limited
- Depot: Khlong Tan (Urban route) Chachoengsao (Inter city route)
- Rolling stock: Siemens Desiro Class 360/3 (Urban route) CR300AF (Inter city route)

History
- Planned opening: 2029

Technical
- Line length: 220 km (140 mi)
- Track gauge: 1,435 mm (4 ft 8 1/2 in)
- Operating speed: Urban: 160 km/h (100 mph); Intercity: 250 km/h (155 mph)
Route map
Map

The Don Mueang–Suvarnabhumi–U-Tapao high-speed railway, officially known as the High-Speed Rail Linking Three Airports Project (Thai: โครงการรถไฟความเร็วสูงเชื่อม 3 สนามบิน) is the second High-Speed rail line project in Thailand, being due to open in 2029 between Don Mueang International Airport, Suvarnabhumi Airport and U-Tapao International Airport. It will be operated by Asia Era One Company Limited, a special-purpose vehicles by the consortium of Charoen Pokphand Group Company, Limited (CP) and partners Ch. Karnchang PLC. (CK), Bangkok Expressway and Metro PLC. (BEM), Italian-Thai Development PLC. (ITD) and China Railway Construction Corporation Limited (CRCC).

This project is part of the Eastern Economic Corridor of Thailand.

The project has made virtually no progress as of the end of 2025. In July 2026, the State Railway of Thailand confirmed that Asia Era One submitted a formal notice invoking its right to terminate the joint investment contract. According to SRT governor, the consortium stated that it could not obtain all required Board of Investment (BOI) privileges within the contractual deadline, preventing SRT from issuing the Notice to Proceed.

== History ==
A HSR line to the eastern seaboard was first proposed in 1996, but there was no progress for over a decade. In 2009, the government requested the Office of Transport and Traffic Policy and Planning (OTP) to create a plan for new HSR network in Thailand that included an eastern HSR line to Rayong. The route was finalised before the 2011 election with the promise to begin construction the next year if the government was re-elected, but they lost the election. After the 2011 election, the new government reviewed all HSR plans and the SRT stated that the line would be tendered in early-2014. After the May 2014 coup there were further delays while the military government reviewed all HSR lines, initially deferring all projects. In early-2016, the government agreed to proceed with the eastern HSR route and suggested that it could be extended to Don Mueang International Airport beyond the terminus at Bang Sue Intercity Terminal thus providing a link with three airports. Extending the line would provide a link between Don Mueang Airport, Suvarnabhumi Airport, and U-Tapao International Airport in Ban Chang District.

During 2017, OTP and the Ministry of Transport in consultation with the SRT agreed that by extending the line to terminate at Don Mueang it would effectively include the long delayed extension of the Airport Rail Link (Bangkok) from Makkasan Station to Don Mueang Airport as part of the project. The Eastern Economic Corridor Office (EEC Office) in October 2017 finalised previous OTP plans to build the 10 station Eastern HSR line linking Don Mueang Airport, Bang Sue, Makkasan, Suvarnabhumi Airport, Chonburi, Si Racha, Pattaya, U-Tapao Airport, and Rayong. In early-2018, the section to Rayong was excluded due to environmental and safety concerns and it was decided that the line would terminate at U-Tapao Airport.

The SRT stated that the first tenders for the Eastern HSR line are expected to be tendered by May 2018 with a four month auction period before the contract is awarded. The cost of the project was estimated to be over 200 billion baht, of which the Thai Government would fund 123 billion baht and the private sector estimated to contribute 90 billion baht.

=== Impact ===
Trains on the route are projected to have a speed of 250 kilometres per hour over the 220 km distance when it opens. According to Kanit Sangsubhan, Secretary-General of the Eastern Economic Corridor (EEC) Office, tourist numbers will increase by eight percent due to the train. "It will handle 15 million passengers in the next five years, 30 million passengers in the next 15 years and 60 million passengers in the next 20 years," Mr Kanit said. Without specifying a time frame, he said the route will generate a return of 700 billion baht. It is expected to create 19,000 new jobs in the EEC according to the Employers Confederation of Thai Trade and Industry.

=== Construction contracts and progress ===
Two rival consortia vied for the airport link contract. The Charoen Pokphand (CP) Group-led consortium consisting of Italian-Thai Development, China Railway Construction Corporation Ltd, CH. Karnchang, and Bangkok Expressway and Metro, won the project with a 224 billion baht bid in December 2018. Their winning bid is valid until 8 November 2019. Until 16 October 2019, the consortium had refused to sign the contract, citing land expropriation and eviction problems and the consortium's request that the government share the risk in the project. Negotiations were further complicated by the resignation of the entire board of the State Railway. On 16 October 2019, news reports announced that the CP consortium intends to sign the rail deal on 25 October. The project was eventually approved in October 2019 as a public private partnership between the Thai government and Charoen Pokphand/China Railway Construction Corporation. The assets will revert to state ownership after 50 years.

== Construction project ==
The high-speed rail project connecting three airports involves constructing a route over the existing Airport Rail Link to connect to the three main airports in Bangkok and its surrounding areas: Don Mueang Airport, Suvarnabhumi Airport, and U-Tapao Airport in Rayong Province. This also includes connections between Bangkok and the Eastern Economic Corridor (EEC). The construction details are as follows:

=== Phase One (Don Mueang - Suvarnabhumi - U-Tapao) (Preparation for construction) ===
==== Don Mueang Airport - Krung Thep Aphiwat ====
- Distance: 14 kilometers

After leaving Bangkok Central Station, the train will run along Vibhavadi Rangsit Road, parallel to the Dark Red Line suburban railway, passing through Laksi district, intersecting with the Pink Line at the intersection with Chaeng Wattana Road, and ending at Don Mueang Station.

==== Krung Thep Aphiwat - Phaya Thai ====
- Distance: 7.8 kilometers

After passing Phaya Thai Station, the train line gradually descends to underground level, then turns right and runs along Chitralada Palace, Ramathibodi Hospital Faculty of Medicine, at Kamphaeng Phet 5 Road, passing Chitralada Royal Railway Station, Ratchawithi Railway Station, and Sam Sen Railway Station, before elevating back to level 4 to enter the platform at Bangkok Central Station.

This extension was planned to accommodate passengers from Bangkok Central Station Aphiwat, allowing them to connect to the city's airport transfer station and Suvarnabhumi Airport. Passengers from Suvarnabhumi Airport would also be able to access Bangkok Central Station Aphiwat as well. However, the latest plan has cancelled the stop at Ratchawithi Station because the MRT Orange Line no longer connects to this project at that station, making a stop there unnecessary.

Phaya Thai - Lat Krabang

Distance: 23.4 kilometers

This section already exists as part of the Airport Raillink.

==== Lat Krabang - U-Tapao ====
The areas the route passes through are: Chachoengsao Province (Mueang Chachoengsao District, Ban Pho District), Chonburi Province (Mueang Chonburi District, Si Racha District, Bang Lamung District, Sattahip District), and Rayong Province (Ban Chang District).

The route, after leaving Suvarnabhumi Airport, would turn right and run along the Eastern Railway line, entering Chachoengsao province. It would then change direction, running along the Eastern Railway line on the coast, entering Chonburi and Rayong provinces. Before turning right and descending to an underground level, it would pass under Sukhumvit Road in the U-Tapao Airport commercial area and stop under Terminal 3 of U-Tapao Airport. From there, it would exit U-Tapao and turn right, terminating at Rayong railway station. The total distance was 193.5 kilometers. However, due to environmental control issues in the section passing through the Map Ta Phut Industrial Estate, a new environmental impact assessment is required. Therefore, the U-Tapao - Rayong section has become a future study route instead, reducing the total distance to 170 kilometers from Lat Krabang station.

12 stations

The train service is divided into two main types and three sub-types:

- City Line adds 7 stations, running from Suvarnabhumi Station to Chachoengsao Station and then returning to Don Mueang Station.
- HST is divided into the Standard Line, which is a service that picks up and drops off passengers at every station from Chachoengsao onwards, except for the stations between Hua Takhe and Bang Toei, and the Airport Express, which is the service that goes non-stop to U-Tapao Airport Station only.

=== Phase two (currently under detailed route study). ===
==== U-Tapao - Trat ====
- The areas that the route passes through include Ban Chang District, Mueang Rayong District, and Klaeng District in Rayong Province; Mueang Chanthaburi District in Chanthaburi Province; and Mueang Trat District in Trat Province.
- After leaving U-Tapao Airport, the route turns right, passing through the Map Ta Phut Industrial Estate, entering Rayong Railway Station and Klaeng Railway Station, crossing into Chanthaburi Province, entering Chanthaburi Railway Station, and ending the entire route at Trat Railway Station in Mueang Trat District, Trat Province.
- Four educational stations .
- The train service operates exclusively on the HST Standard Line.

== Service ==
=== Local connections ===
Station	Thai	City Route	Standard Train	Airport Express	Type	Distance (km)	Transfers	Location
Phase 1: Don Mueang - Phaya (Airport Rail Link Extension)
Don Mueang	ดอนเมือง	●	●	●	elevated	-20.122	SRT Dark Red Line; Northeastern HSR Line	Don Mueang, Bangkok
Krung Thep Aphiwat	กรุงเทพอภิวัฒน์	●	●	●	ground level with elevated platforms	-6.375	SRT Dark Red Line; SRT Light Red Line; MRT Blue Line	Chatuchak, Bangkok
Phase 2: Airport Rail Link
Phaya Thai	พญาไท	●			elevated	0.179	SRT Light Red Line; BTS Sukhumvit Line	Ratchathewi, Bangkok
Ratchaprarop	ราชปรารภ	●			elevated	0.982	MRT Orange Line	Ratchathewi, Bangkok
Makkasan	มักกะสัน	●	●	●	ground level with elevated platforms	3.000	SRT Light Red Line; MRT Blue Line	Ratchathewi, Bangkok
Ramkhamhaeng	รามคำแหง	●			elevated	7.399	SRT Light Red Line	Suan Luang, Bangkok
Hua Mak	หัวหมาก	●			elevated	12.305	SRT Light Red Line; MRT Yellow Line	Suan Luang, Bangkok
Ban Thap Chang	บ้านทับช้าง	●			elevated	17.267		Prawet, Bangkok
Lat Krabang	ลาดกระบัง	●			elevated	23.498		Lat Krabang, Bangkok
Suvarnabhumi	สุวรรณภูมิ	●	●	●	underground	28.812		Bang Phli, Samut Prakan
Phase 3 : Suvarnabhumi - U-Tapao (Intercity Rail)
Hua Takhe (King Mongkut's University of Technology)	หัวตะเข้ (พระจอมเกล้าลาดกระบัง)	●			elevated			
Khlong Luang Phaeng	คลองหลวงแพ่ง	●			elevated			
Khlong Udom Chon Chon	คลองอุดมชลจร	●			elevated			
Preng	เปรง	●			elevated			
Khlong Khwaeng Klan	คลองแขวงกลั่น	●			elevated			
Bang Phra Canal	คลองบางพระ	●			elevated			
Bang Toei	บางเตย	●			elevated			
Chachoengsao	ฉะเชิงเทรา	●	●		ground level with elevated platforms	64.839		Mueang Chachoengsao, Chachoengsao
Chonburi	ชลบุรี		●		ground level with elevated platforms	113.449		Mueang Chonburi, Chonburi
Si Racha	ศรีราชา		●		ground level with elevated platforms	136.119		Si Racha, Chonburi
Pattaya	พัทยา		●		ground level with elevated platforms	160.929		Pattaya, Chonburi
U-Tapao	อู่ตะเภา		●	●	underground	196.410		Ban Chang, Rayong

== Extension ==
A future phase 2 extension could extend as far as Trat. However, a 2020 feasibility study raised questions about its value.

== Present status ==
- 2025 Dec: Construction has not commenced due to the pending cabinet approval for the revised financial terms of the contract and lack of required land acquisition. Construction will take 5 years, with the revised target completion date of 2030.

== See also ==
- High-speed rail in Thailand
