= On Nut Road =

Street in Bangkok, Thailand

Coordinates: 13°42′41.07″N 100°36′35.98″E

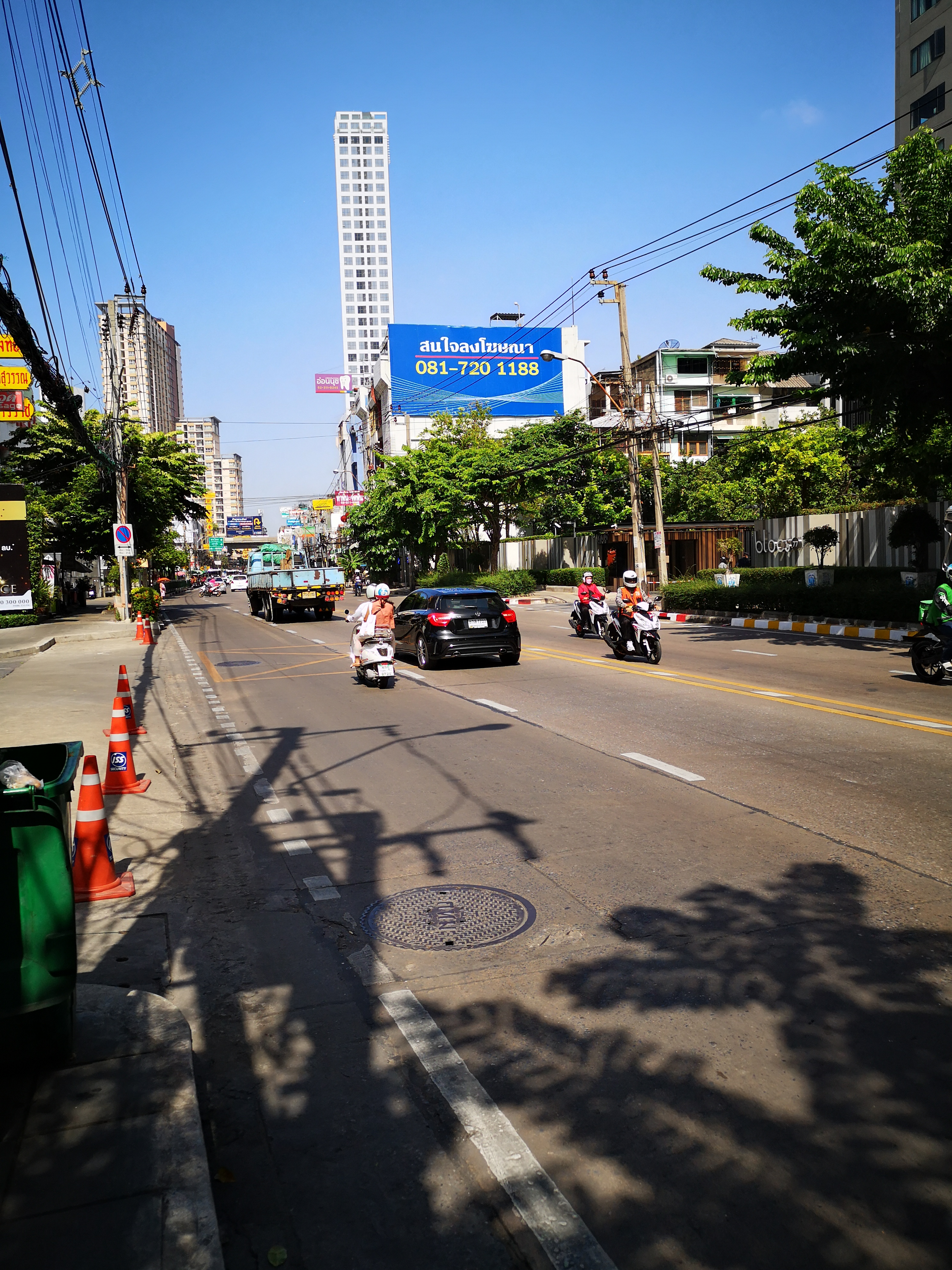
On Nut Road view toward Sukhumvit Road

On Nut Road (Thai: ถนนอ่อนนุช, pronounced [tʰā.nǒn ʔɔ̀ːn nút]) is the name of a road in Bangkok and the neighbourhood that it passes through. Its name "On Nut", was set in honour of the surname of the land donor to build the early section of the road. As a soi (side street) branching off Sukhumvit Road (Highway 3), the road is also known as Soi Sukhumvit 77 (ซอยสุขุมวิท 77). On Nut is considered an important street in eastern Bangkok, providing a shortcut connecting various main roads. Communities of both Thai and foreign residents can be found along On Nut, which passes many condominiums and international schools.

== Route ==
On Nut Road branches off from Sukhumvit Road at On Nut Junction, about 300 m (984.3 ft) north of On Nut BTS Station in the area of Phra Khanong Nuea Subdistrict, Watthana District. From there, it runs parallel to Khlong Phra Khanong and Khlong Prawet Burirom to the northeast, crossing Khlong Bang Nang Chin into On Nut Subdistrict, Suan Luang District. Upon reaching Soi On Nut 7 (Wat Mahabut), it bends to the southeast, before continuing to the east and northeast. It intersects with Srinagarindra Road (Highway 3344) at Suan Luang (Si Nut) Junction and continues in the same direction, crossing Khlong Nong Bon into Prawet District. This section also serves as the administrative demarcation line between the subdistricts of Nong Bon and Dokmai.

The road continues running northeast and intersects Phatthanakan Road at the On Nut-Phatthanakan Interchange, then cuts eastward across Chaloem Phra Kiat Ratchakan Thi 9 Road at Prawet Intersection and intersects with Kanchanaphisek Road, the outer ring road of Bangkok, at On Nut Intersection. Finally, it cuts across Sukhaphiban 2 Road at Sirindhorn Hospital Junction before terminating at Soi On Nut 90 (Sirindhorn Hospital) at a tripoint between the Prawet and Dokmai Subdistricts of Prawet District and Lat Krabang Subdistrict in Lat Krabang District. Past this point, it becomes Lat Krabang Road, which runs continuously with it. Total distance is about 12 km (7.5 mi).

=== Notable locations ===
Wat Mahabut in Soi On Nut 7 is the site of the shrine dedicated to Mae Nak Phra Khanong, a well-known Thai female ghost.

Saphan San Samran (สะพานแสนสำราญ, pronounced [sā.pʰāːn sɛ̌ːn sǎm.rāːn], "joyfully bridge") is a bridge over Khlong Phra Khanong in Soi On Nut 1/1 (Habito Road). Due to the beautiful scenery with high-rise condominium complexes as a backdrop, it became a popular photo check-in point for teenagers.

== See also ==
- On Nut Subdistrict – administrative district of Suan Luang District is named after the road
