= Lat Krabang station =

Metro station in Bangkok, Thailand

Lat Krabang ลาดกระบัง
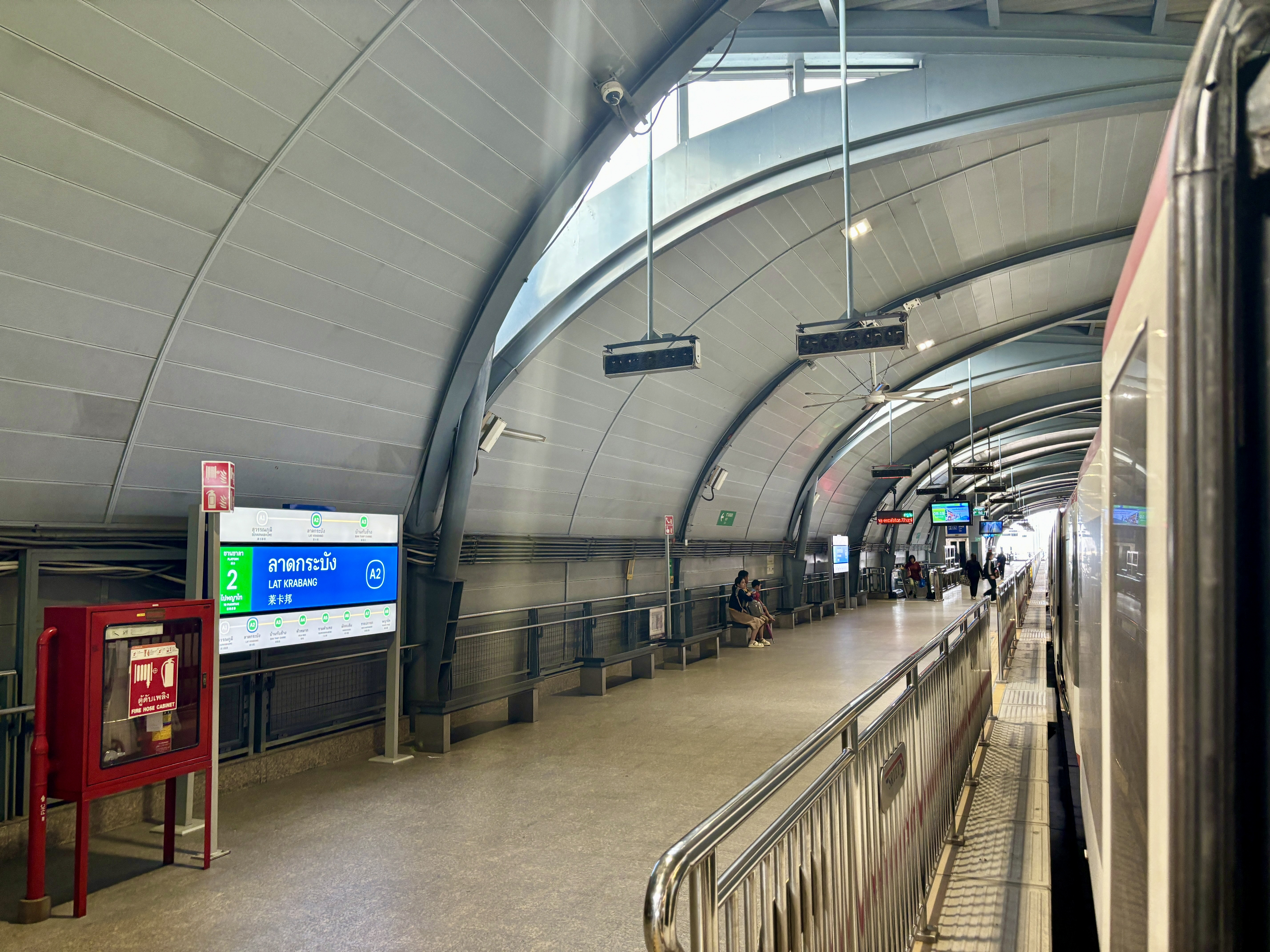
- ARL Platforms

General information
- Location: Lat Krabang District; Bangkok; Thailand
- Coordinates: 13°43′39.43″N 100°44′55″E
- Owner: State Railway of Thailand
- Operator: State Railway of Thailand (SRT); Asia Era One Company Limited (AERA1) (ARL)
- Platforms: 2 side platforms (ARL); 3 (SRT)
- Tracks: 2 (ARL); 3 (SRT)

Construction
- Parking: Yes
- Accessible: Yes

History
- Opened: 14 January 1907; 119 years ago (SRT); 23 August 2010; 16 years ago (ARL)
- Electrified: 25 kV 50 Hz AC

Services
Preceding station	Airport Rail Link	Following station
Ban Thap Chang towards Phaya Thai	City Line	Suvarnabhumi Terminus
Preceding station	State Railway of Thailand	Following station
Ban Thap Chang towards Hua Lamphong	Eastern Line	Phra Chom Klao Halt towards Chuk Samet or Poipet (Cambodia)
Location

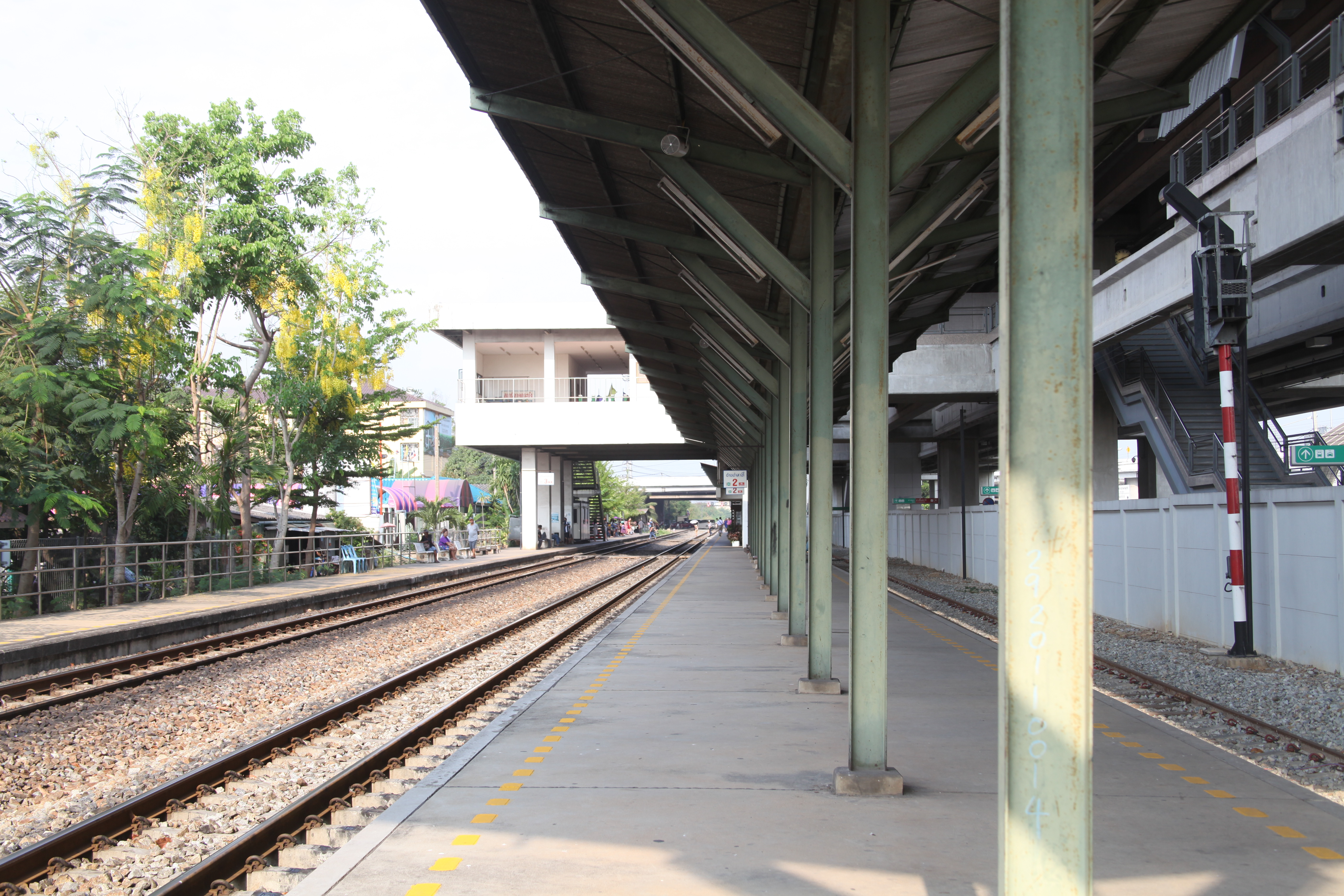
SRT station

Lat Krabang Station (Thai: สถานีลาดกระบัง) is an Airport Rail Link station and a station on the Eastern Line of the State Railway of Thailand, located on Rom Klao Road (Thai: ถนนร่มเกล้า) in Lat Krabang District, Eastern Bangkok.

== History ==
Lat Krabang opened as a railway station on 24 January 1907 on the Eastern Line between Hua Lamphong (named simply as "Bangkok" at the time) and Chachoengsao Junction, operated by the State Railway of Thailand.

The ARL station opened on 23 August 2010. The ARL is intended to be the backbone of the future High Speed Rail line (HSR) to Chonburi and Rayong. This would use the current ARL tracks, and would connect all three nearby airports; starting at Don Mueang International Airport and passing through Krung Thep Aphiwat Central Terminal, Makkasan Station, Suvarnabhumi International Airport, Chachoengsao, Chonburi, Si Racha, Pattaya and terminating at U-Tapao International Airport.

== Station layout ==
Platform
Platform	Side platform
Platform	Platform 1	City Line towards Suvarnabhumi
Platform	Platform 2	City Line towards Phaya Thai
Platform	Side platform
Concourse		Exits, ticket machines, shops
Ground	-	Lat Krabang railway station, bus stop, parking lot
