= Nong Bon Water Sports Center =

Public park in Bangkok

- Interactive map of Nong Bon Water Sports Center
- Type: Public park
- Location: Nong Bon, Prawet, Bangkok
- Coordinates: 13°41′34.9″N 100°39′44.1″E
- Area: 254 acres (103 ha)
- Created: 2008
- Operator: Bangkok Metropolitan Administration (BMA)
- Status: Open year round
- Public transit: Udom Suk BTS station

Nong Bon Water Sports Center (Thai: ศูนย์กีฬาทางน้ำบึงหนองบอน) is the largest public park in Bangkok with an area of 644 rai (103 ha; 255 acres), it is considered larger than the adjacent well-known Suan Luang Rama IX.

Bueng Nong Bon (Nong Bon Lake) is an artificial lake built to support the amount of water runoff from the east to prevent flooding during the flood season (around October). It is one of the royal projects initiated by King Rama IX.

The area of the reservoir has been developed into a public park and water sports center of Bangkok Metropolitan Administration (BMA), open to the general public. It offers windsurfing, kayaking and sailing.

Also, there is a 4 km (2.5 mi) long bike and jogging trail that circles the lake. For those who bring pets, there is also a dog park zone available.

Nong Bon Water Sports Center is in the Chaloem Phra Kiat Ratchakan Thi 9 Soi 43, about 700 m (2,296.6 ft) from the main road (Chaloem Phra Kiat Ratchakan Thi 9 Rd), next to the northwest corner of Suan Luang Rama IX. Open daily from 5:30 am – 6:00 pm.
