= Wanatham Park =

Park in Bangkok

- Interactive map of Wanatham Park
- Type: Public park
- Location: Soi Premier 1, Nong Bon, Prawet, Bangkok
- Coordinates: 13°40′59″N 100°39′25″E
- Area: 15 acres (6.1 ha)
- Created: 2002
- Operator: Bangkok Metropolitan Administration (BMA)
- Status: Open daily from 05.00 am to 09.00 pm
- Website: http://office.bangkok.go.th/publicpark/park17.asp

Wanatham Park, also written as Wanadharm (Thai: สวนวนธรรม) is a public park in Bangkok.

== History ==
Wanatham Park is the first public park to address mental development in Bangkok. Started in 2002, the park was opened for service on 26 February 2009. Apart from its function as a public park, it also aims to enhance mental development through Dharma or religious studies. The park was founded to honour the Queen Sirikit's 70th birthday.

== Park components ==
Encompassing 38 rai, 3 ngan, and 46 square wa it is divided by ponds, into three main parts connected by bridges. The first hosts the Klang Panya Building or library which is a comprehensive respository of general and religious knownledge, an office building, and the School of Trees where information about ecosystems is available; family activities and held at weekends or holidays.

The second is the Dharma Puzzle Ground, Community Faith Ground, and Valley of Wisdom. This area is arranged for group activities, including making merit, giving alms, listening to Buddhist sermons as well as study of simplified Buddhist doctrine.

The last second, the inner area, houses the Dharma Practice Hall and Lodging Hall which were designed as serene sites for Dharma practice. People can stay overnight and conduct religious practices here. The park also houses a collection of trees associated with the Buddhist faith such as sacred fig, sal tree, banyan, Indian oak, and Burmese sal species. Botanical information on each species is provided.

== Location ==
The park is situated behind larger and more well-known Rama IX Park, Prawet District, Bangkok's eastern suburb.
