= Wat Krathum Suea Pla =

Buddhist temple in Bangkok, Thailand

- Location within Bangkok

Religion
- Affiliation: Buddhism
- Sect: Theravāda Mahā Nikāya
- Status: Civil temple

Location
- Location: 5 Soi On Nut 67, On Nut rd, Prawet, Prawet, Bangkok 10250
- Country: Thailand
- Coordinates: 13.7237541679°N 100.689014735°E

Architecture
- Founder: unknown
- Completed: 1772

Wat Krathum Suea Pla (Thai: วัดกระทุ่มเสือปลา) is a Buddhist temple in Bangkok.

== History and denomination ==
The temple's founder is unknown but it was presumably built in 1772 in the late Ayutthaya period. There is evidence that Khun Prawet Chanarak (magnate Eiew), a rich Chinese immigrant who served in the royal court and his wife Son Kittikowit restored this temple in 1924.

The name Krathum Suea Pla was derived from the krathum trees (Neolamarckia cadamba), which grew in abundance around the area as well as the numerous Suea Pla or fishing cats (Prionailurus viverrinus) inhabited the site.

== Highlights ==
The temple has many interesting things including Principle Buddha image named Luang Pho Phet is a replica of the Sukhothai style Buddha image, Phra Phuttha Chinnarat of Phitsanulok. Its robe elaborately decorated with thousands of Russian diamonds, is recorded as part of unseen Bangkok.

Wax museum, which houses magnificent and lifelike wax sculptures of various famous monks i.e. Somdet Phra Phutthachan (To Phrommarangsi), also familiarly known as Somdet To, Luang Pho Ruesi Lingdam, Luang Pu Thuat etc.

Museum of 80 Buddha image postures, displays Buddha images in various postures with detailed explanation of them, some of them are postures are hard to find in modern times. Both museums are important learning resources about Buddhism.

In addition, there also is Chao Pho Suea (tiger god) Shrine, is believed to have been situated in the temple for several hundred years. It was originally just a small spirit house with painting of a tiger. The shrine and the tiger god statue were built at a later stage. The canal at the back of the temple is full of fish and serves as a recreation area.

The temple's Phra Pariyatti Dhamma School (Buddhist school for novice and monks) was founded in 1945. Also situated in the temple's compound is Wat Krathum Suea Pla School, which is the primary school under the BMA's supervision.

== Location ==
The temple is located in Soi On Nut 67 on the southern side of Khlong Prawet Burirom canal in the southeastern part of Bangkok.
