= Dok Mai, Bangkok =

Dok Mai ดอกไม้
- Khwaeng
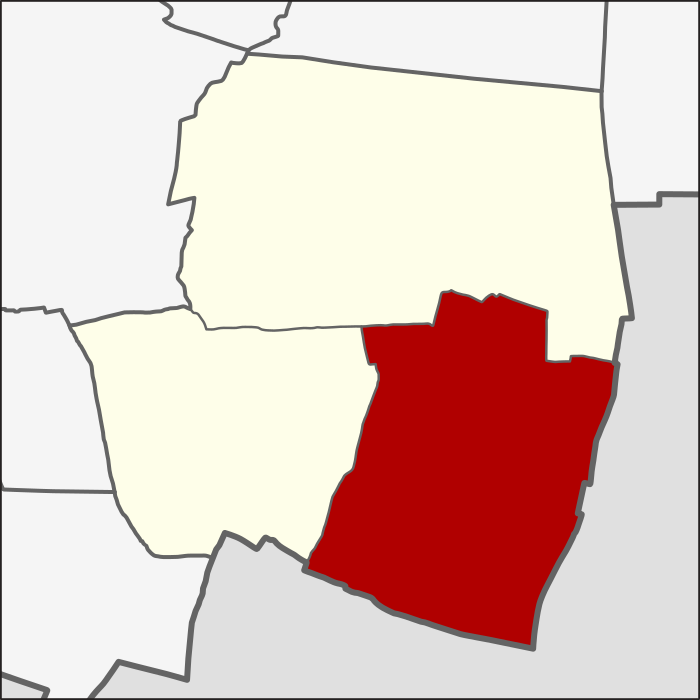
- Location in Prawet District
- Coordinates: 13°40′04.8″N 100°41′02.8″E
- Country: Thailand
- Province: Bangkok
- Khet: Prawet

Area
  - Total: 15.172 km^{2} (5.858 sq mi)

Population (2021)
  - Total: 53,343
  - Density: 3,515.89/km^{2} (9,106.1/sq mi)
- Time zone: UTC+7 (ICT)
- Postal code: 10250
- TIS 1099: 103203

Dok Mai also written as Dokmai (Thai: ดอกไม้, pronounced [dɔ̀ːk máːj]) is a khwaeng (sub-district) of Prawet District, Bangkok.

Dok Mai is a southeast part of the district. Its name translates to "flower". Neighbouring sub-districts are (from the north clockwise): Prawet in its district (Khlong Makham Thet, Khlong Chorakhe Khop, Khlong Pak Lak, and Khlong Khan Taek are the borderlines), Racha Thewa, Bang Phli Yai in Bang Phli District of Samut Prakan Province (Khlong Khan Taek, Khlong Sing To, Khlong Paknam, and Khlong Salut are the borderlines), Bang Kaeo in Bang Phli District of Samut Prakan Province (farm dike and Khlong Ton Tan are the borderlines), Nong Bon in its district (Khlong Palat Priang is a borderline).
