= Ramkhamhaeng station =

Metro station in Bangkok, Thailand

Coordinates: 13.7429°N 100.6000°E

Ramkhamhaeng รามคำแหง
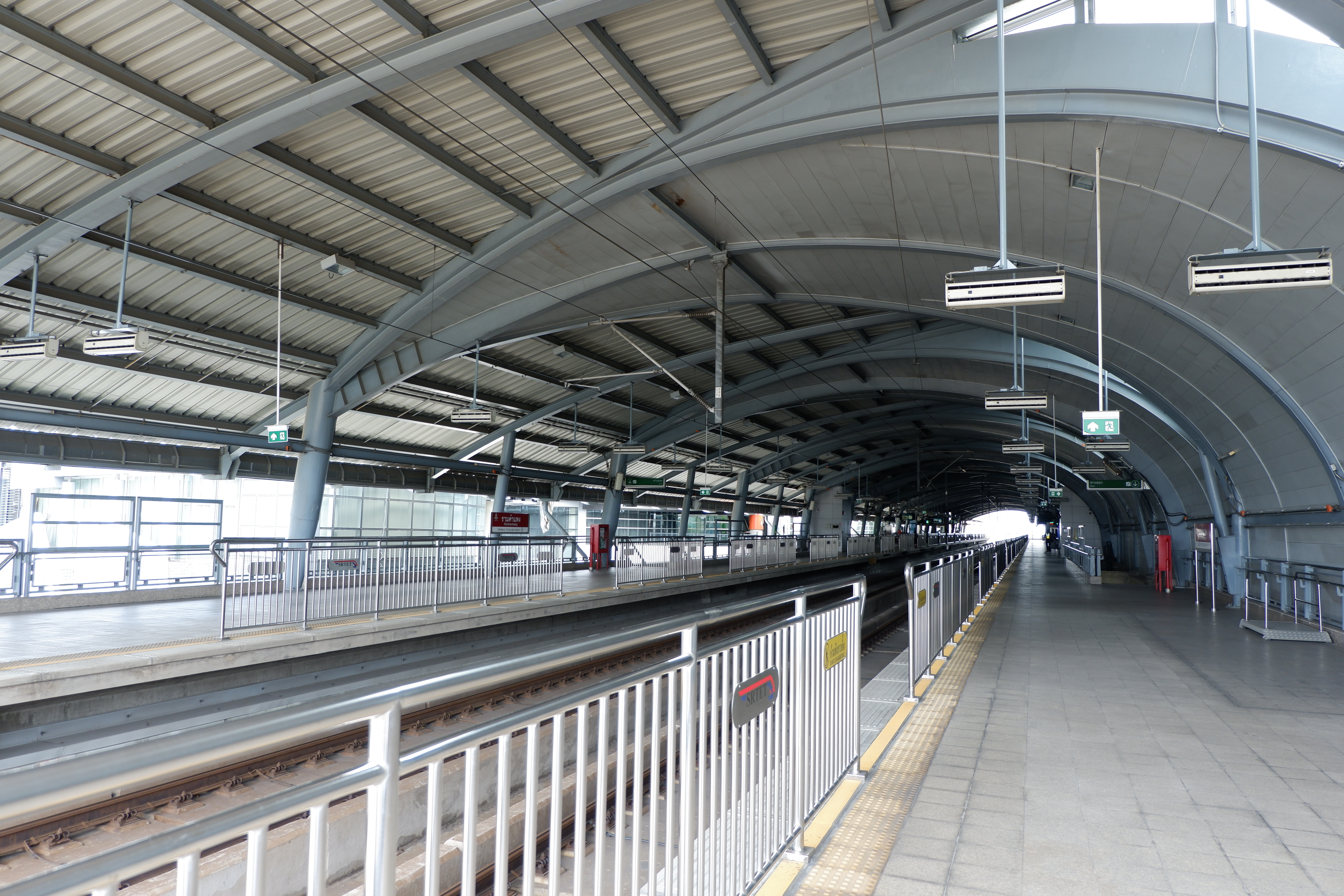
- ARL Platforms

General information
- Location: Suan Luang, Bangkok, Thailand
- System: ARL
- Operator: State Railway of Thailand (SRT); Asia Era One Company Limited (AERA1) (ARL)
- Platforms: 2 side platforms
- Tracks: 2

Construction
- Structure type: Elevated
- Parking: Yes
- Accessible: Yes

Other information
- Station code: A5

History
- Opened: 23 August 2010; 16 years ago

Services
Preceding station	Airport Rail Link	Following station
Makkasan towards Phaya Thai	City Line	Hua Mak towards Suvarnabhumi
Out-of-system intercharge
Preceding station	State Railway of Thailand	Following station
Khlong Tan towards Hua Lamphong	Eastern Line transfer at Sukhumvit 71 Halt	Hua Mak towards Chuk Samet or Poipet (Cambodia)
Location

Ramkhamhaeng station (Thai: สถานีรามคำแหง RTGS: Satani Ramkhamhaeng) is an elevated Airport Rail Link station located on Ramkhamhaeng Road (also known as Sukhumvit Road branch 71) in Suan Luang District, Bangkok, Thailand. It serves as a key connection point for commuters traveling between Suvarnabhumi Airport and central Bangkok, with nearby access to local buses and the Saen Saep Express Boat.

== History ==
The station opened on 22 August 2010 as part of the Airport Rail Link's City Line, which connects Suvarnabhumi Airport to Phaya Thai in the city center. An infill station named Sun Wichai was planned between Makkasan Station and Ramkhamhaeng but was ultimately not constructed. Beneath the ARL station is the Sukhumvit 71 railway halt operated by the State Railway of Thailand, providing additional commuter rail access.

== Services ==
The station is served by the Airport Rail Link's City Line, with trains running every 10 minutes during peak hours (06:00–09:00 and 16:00–20:00) and every 15 minutes off-peak and on weekends. Fares from Ramkhamhaeng to Suvarnabhumi Airport are 30 THB, while to Phaya Thai it's 25 THB. The station is approximately 6 miles (10 km) from central Bangkok stations like Hua Lamphong.

Nearby connections include:

- Bus routes such as 40 (from Hua Lamphong) and 58/113 (from Makkasan).
- Saen Saep Express Boat along the parallel canal, with stops every 5–10 minutes.
- Future integration with the MRT Orange Line's Ramkhamhaeng station (IVS12) and nearby Ramkhamhaeng 12 station (under construction, expected 2027–2028).

=== Operational time ===
To	First service	Last service
City Line Weekdays
SVB	06.09	00.09
Phaya Thai	06.19	00.08
City Line Weekend
SVB	06.09	00.09
Phaya Thai	06.28	00.08
City Line Peak Hour
Phaya Thai	06.59	08.59

== Sukhumvit 71 railway halt ==
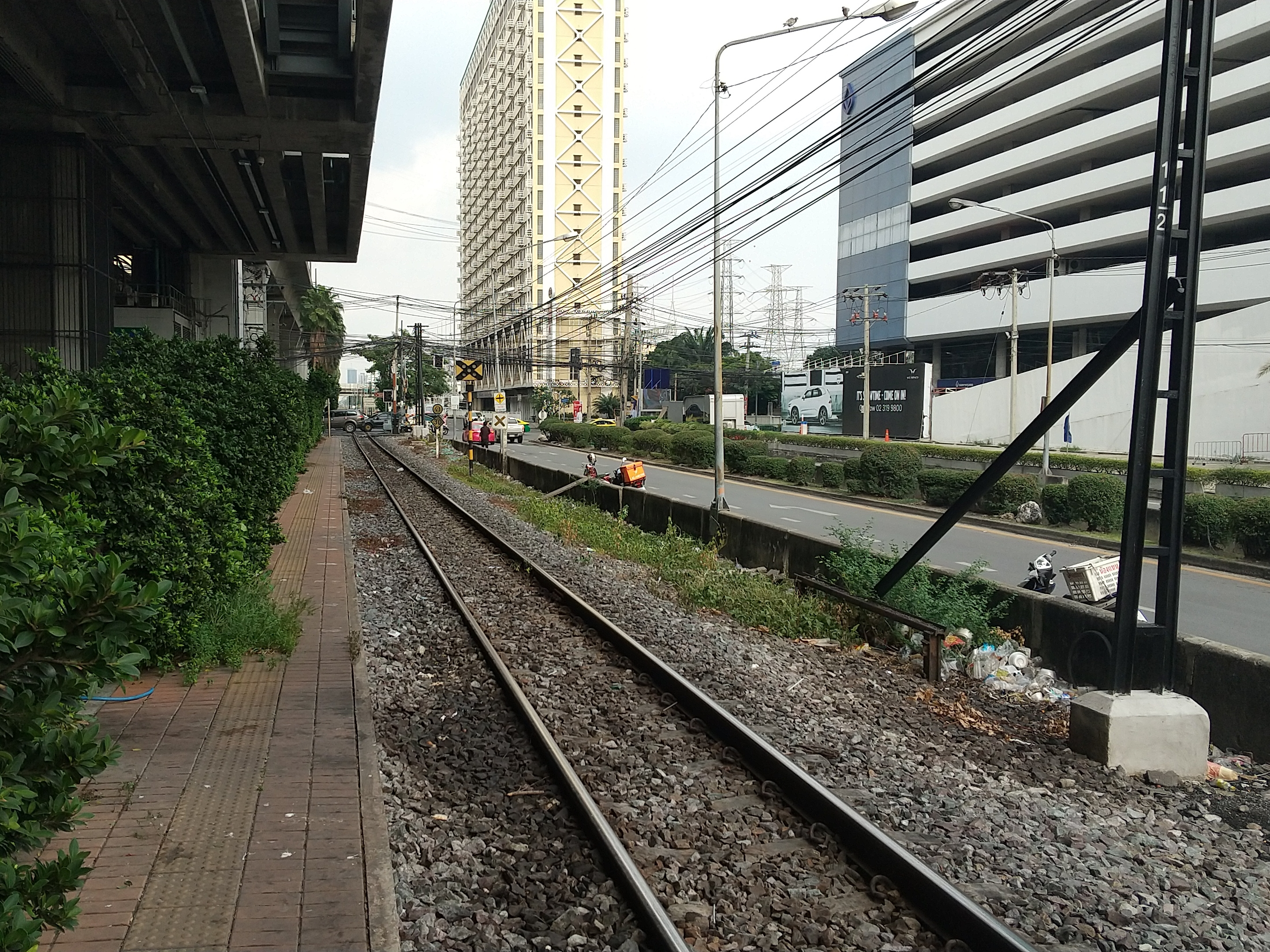
Sukhumvit 71 railway halt

Beneath the station is the Sukhumvit 71 railway halt operated by the State Railway of Thailand. It operates intercity services on the Eastern Line.

== Station layout ==
Platform
Platform	Side platform
Platform	Platform 1	Airport Rail Link towards Suvarnabhumi
Platform	Platform 2	Airport Rail Link towards Phaya Thai
Platform	Side platform
Concourse	Concourse	Exits, ticket machines, shops
Ground	-	Sukhumvit 71 railway halt, bus stop, parking lot
