= Ban Thap Chang station =

Railway station in Bangkok, Thailand

Coordinates: 13.7328°N 100.6911°E

Ban Thap Chang บ้านทับช้าง
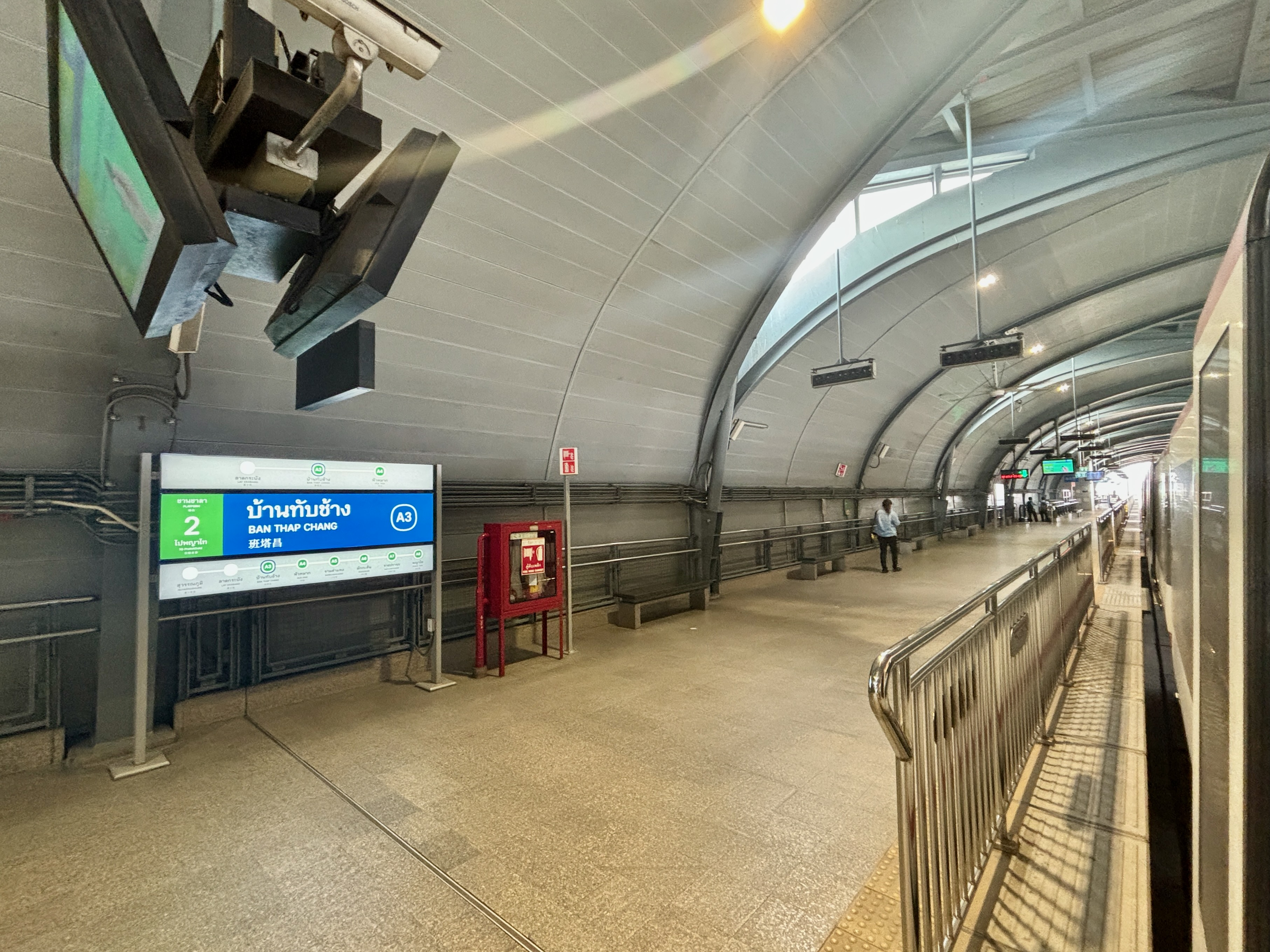
- Airport Link station

General information
- Location: Prawet, Bangkok, Thailand
- System: ARL
- Owner: State Railway of Thailand
- Operator: State Railway of Thailand (SRT); Asia Era One Company Limited (AERA1) (ARL)
- Platforms: 2 side platforms
- Tracks: 2

Construction
- Structure type: Elevated
- Parking: Yes
- Accessible: Yes

Other information
- Station code: A3

History
- Opened: 23 August 2010; 16 years ago

Services
Preceding station	Airport Rail Link	Following station
Hua Mak towards Phaya Thai	City Line	Lat Krabang towards Suvarnabhumi
Preceding station	State Railway of Thailand	Following station
Hua Mak towards Hua Lamphong	Eastern Line	Soi Wat Lan Boon Halt towards Chuk Samet or Poipet (Cambodia)
Location

Ban Thap Chang station (Thai: สถานีบ้านทับช้าง, pronounced [sā.tʰǎː.nīː bâːn tʰáp t͡ɕʰáːŋ]) is a railway station on the Airport Rail Link and the Eastern Line located adjacent to the Bangkok–Chonburi Motorway in Prawet District, Bangkok.

== History ==
=== SRT ===
Ban Thap Chang opened as a railway station on 24 January 1907 on the Eastern Line between Bangkok (Hua Lamphong) and Chachoengsao Junction, operated by the State Railway of Thailand.

=== ARL ===
Ban Thap Chang ARL station opened on 23 August 2010, located a short distance to the east of the ground-level station.

== Station layout ==
ARLPlatforms
ARLPlatforms	Side platform
ARLPlatforms	Platform 1	Airport Rail Link towards Suvarnabhumi
ARLPlatforms	Platform 2	Airport Rail Link towards Phaya Thai
ARLPlatforms	Side platform
Concourse	Concourse	Exits, ticket machines, shops
Ground	-	Ban Thap Chang railway station, bus stop, parking lot
