= Prawet subdistrict =

Prawet ประเวศ
- Khwaeng
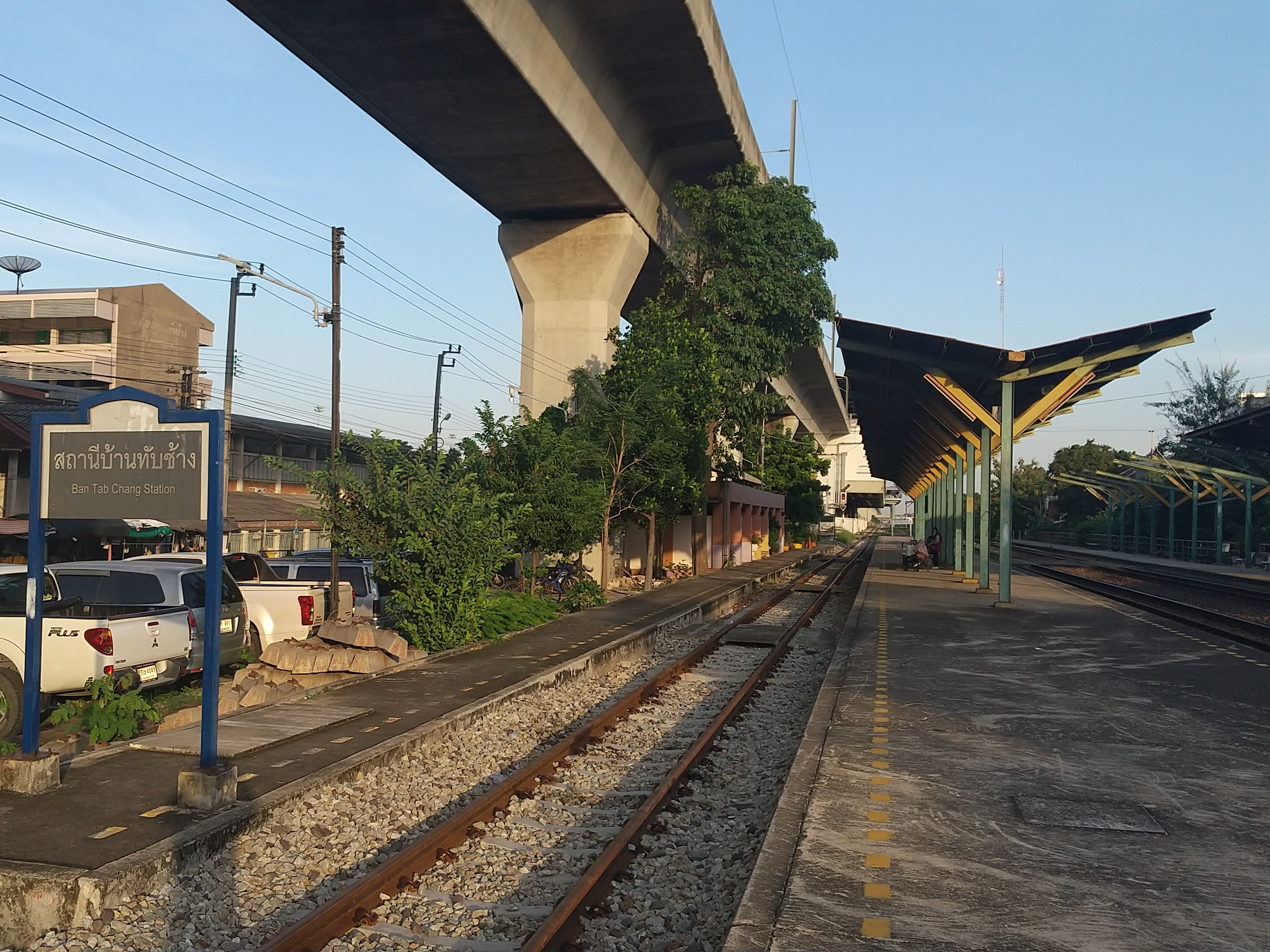
- Ban Thap Chang station, the main railway station of eastern line located in the subdistrict

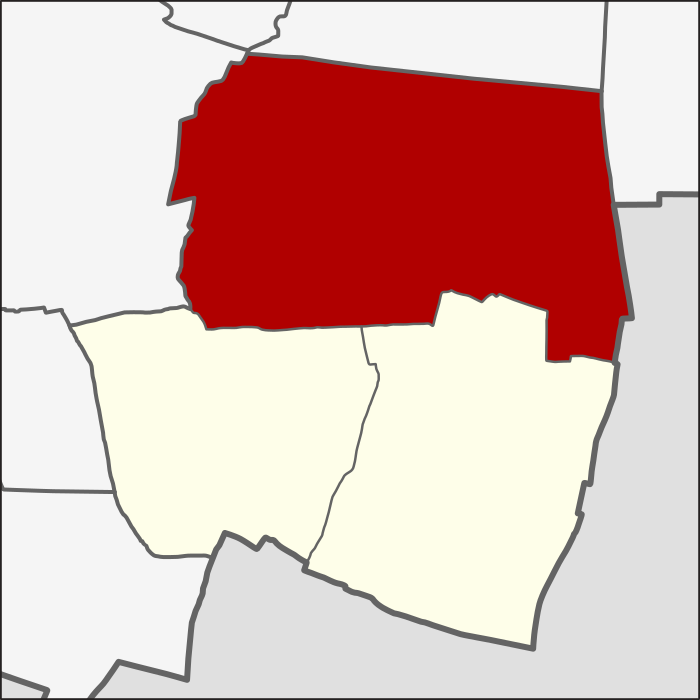
- Location in Prawet District
- Coordinates: 13°43′59.4″N 100°41′19.3″E
- Country: Thailand
- Province: Bangkok
- Khet: Prawet

Area
  - Total: 22.805 km^{2} (8.805 sq mi)

Population (2020)
  - Total: 87,676
- Time zone: UTC+7 (ICT)
- Postal code: 10250
- TIS 1099: 103201

Prawet (Thai: ประเวศ, pronounced [prā.wêːt]) is a khwaeng (subdistrict) of Prawet District, in Bangkok, Thailand. In 2020, it had a total population of 87,676 people.

The word "Prawet" is the shortened of "Prawet Burirom", a khlong (canal) dug through the area in the 19th century. The name mean "entrance to a blissful city".
