= Asia Era One =

Company of Thailand

Asia Era One Company Limited
- Native name: บริษัท เอเชีย เอรา วัน จำกัด
- Headquarters: Bangkok, Thailand
- Area served: Bangkok Metropolitan Area, Thailand
- Owner: Charoen Pokphand

Asia Era One Company Limited (Thai: บริษัท เอเชีย เอรา วัน จำกัด; AERA1) is a Thai consortium and train operator, led by the Charoen Pokphand Group. AERA1 won the bid to construct the high speed rail linking three airports, and has operated the Airport Rail Link line in Bangkok since 2021. In 2019, AERA signed an agreement with the State Railway of Thailand to operate the Airport Rail Link as a concession.

In 2024, AERA1 announced a major overhaul for the Airport Rail Link, including major maintenance to improve the rail system, increase passenger seats, and hiring outside consultants from overseas.
