= Metro Forest =

Park in Bangkok, Thailand

Coordinates: 13°41′30″N 100°42′11″E

Metro Forest Learning Center
- ศูนย์เรียนรู้ป่าในกรุง
- Interactive map of Metro Forest Learning Center
- Type: Urban park
- Location: Prawet district, Bangkok, Thailand
- Area: 12 rai (1.9 ha)
- Opened: 2014

Metro Forest Learning Center (Thai: ศูนย์เรียนรู้ป่าในกรุง) is a park in Prawet district, Bangkok, Thailand. Opened in 2014, the 12 rai (1.9 ha) park was financed by the PTT Reforestation and Ecology Institute and is 6 kilometres (3.7 mi) from Suvarnabhumi Airport. The park was constructed on abandoned land owned by PTT.

The park's landscaping was designed using the Miyawaki method, where native trees are densely planted to foster fast growth.
