= Ratchaprarop station =

Airport Rail Link station in Bangkok, Thailand

Coordinates: 13.7548°N 100.5430°E

Ratchaprarop ราชปรารภ
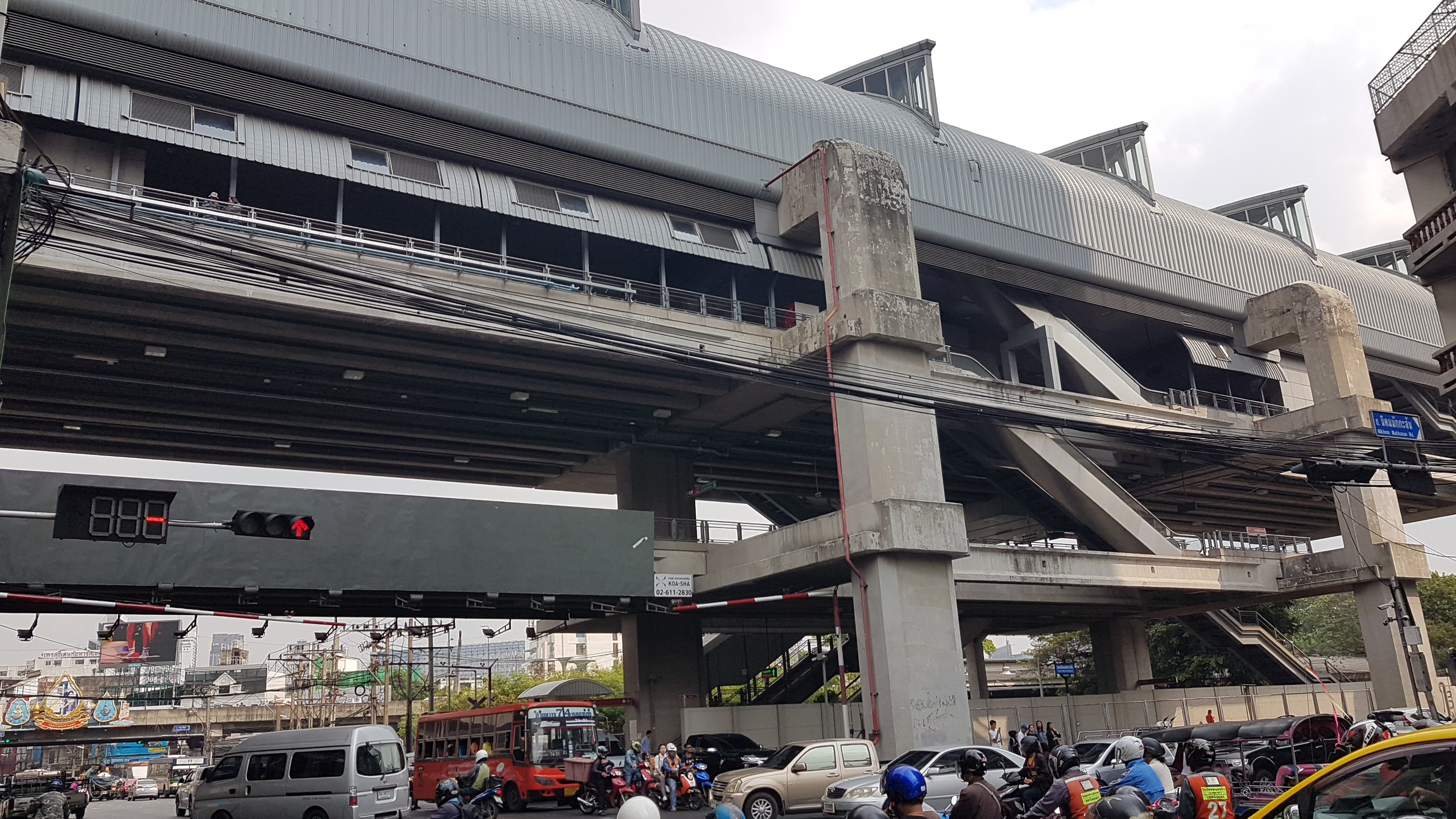

General information
- Location: Ratchathewi, Bangkok, Central Thailand; Thailand
- System: ARL MRT
- Owner: State Railway of Thailand
- Operator: Asia Era One Company Limited (AERA1) (ARL)
- Lines: ARL Airport Rail Link; MRT MRT Orange Line (future)
- Platforms: 2 side platforms
- Tracks: 2
- Connections: BMTA Buses

Construction
- Structure type: Elevated
- Accessible: Yes

Other information
- Station code: A7; OR10

History
- Opened: 23 August 2010; 16 years ago
- Opening: 2030 (Orange Line)
- Electrified: 25 kV AC

Services
Preceding station	Airport Rail Link	Following station
Phaya Thai Terminus	City Line	Makkasan towards Suvarnabhumi
Preceding station	Metropolitan Rapid Transit	Following station
Under construction
Pratunam towards Taling Chan	Orange Line	Din Daeng towards Yaek Rom Klao
Location

Ratchaprarop Station (Thai: สถานีราชปรารภ) is an Airport Rail Link station on Ratchaprarop Road, Ratchathewi, Bangkok, Thailand. In the future, it will become an interchange station for the MRT Orange Line following the opening of the western extension in 2030. The station serves the Pratunam area.

Ratchaprarop was a railway halt on the Eastern Line of the State Railway of Thailand but this has been closed.

== Station layout ==
Platform
Platform	Side platform
Platform	Platform 1	Airport Rail Link towards Suvarnabhumi
Platform	Platform 2	Airport Rail Link towards Phaya Thai
Platform	Side platform
Concourse	Concourse	Ticket machines, tourism office
U2	-	Exits
Ground	-	Bus stop, parking lot, State Railway of Thailand Eastern Line

== Operational time ==
To	First service	Last service
City Line (Weekdays)
Suvarnabhumi	06.03	00.03
Phaya Thai	06.26	00.15
City Line (Weekend)
Suvarnabhumi	06.03	00.03
Phaya Thai	06.35	00.15
City Line (peak hour)
Phaya Thai	07.06	09.06

== Bus connection ==
- Ratchaprarop/Din Daeng Triangle line 13 14 17 54 62 74 77 204 513 539
- Ratchaprarop/Pratunam line 13 14 17 54 62 72 74 77 183 204 513
- Si Ayutthaya line 14 17 62 72 74 77 183 204 513 539
