= Airport Rail Link (Bangkok) =

Rapid transit line in Thailand

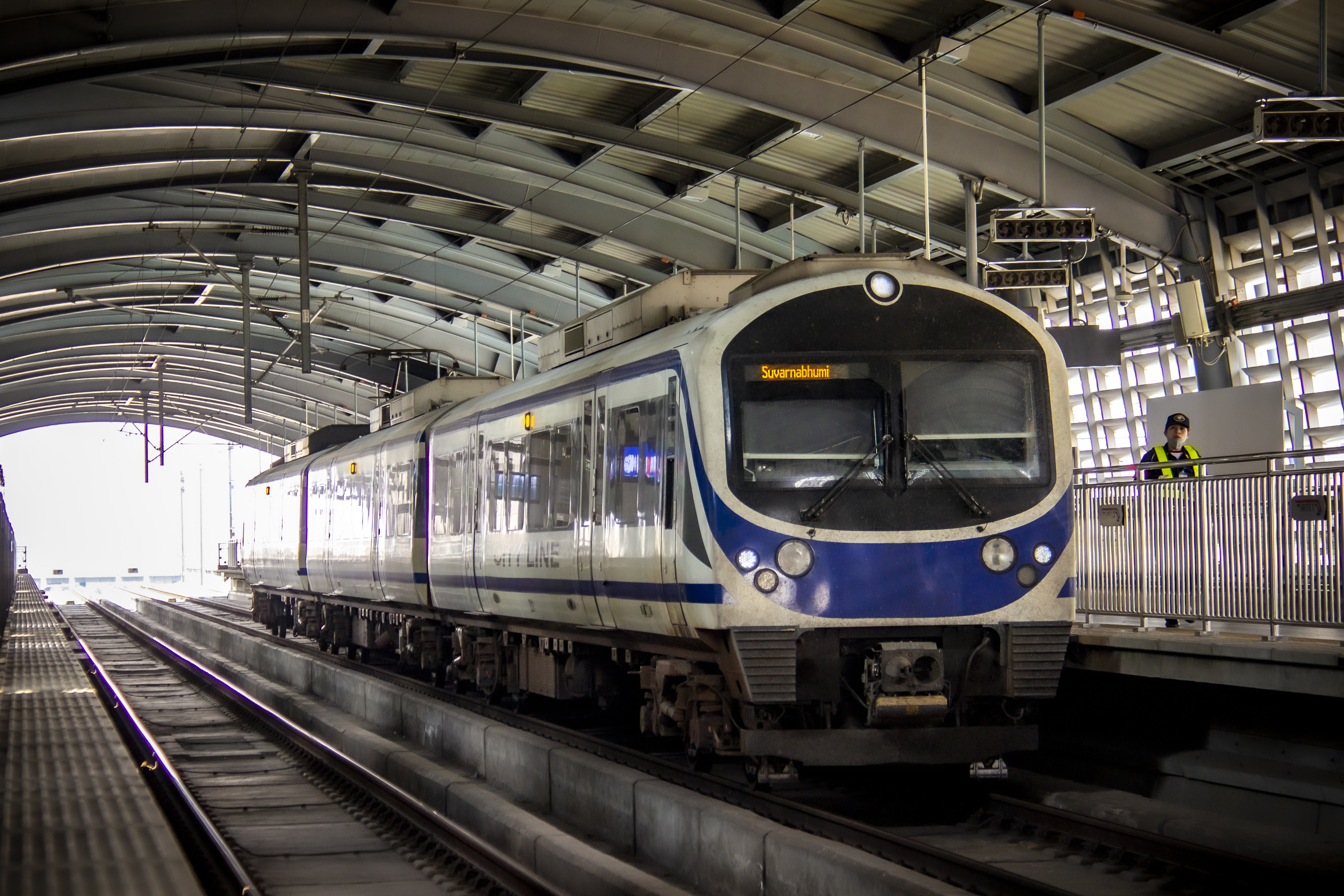
- Airport Rail Link train at Phaya Thai station

Overview
- Other name: Suvarnabhumi Airport Link
- Native name: รถไฟฟ้าเชื่อมท่าอากาศยานสุวรรณภูมิ
- Status: Operating (City Line only) (Note: Express Services will resume once the extension is completed.)
- Owner: State Railway of Thailand
- Locale: Bangkok
- Termini: Suvarnabhumi Airport; Phaya Thai
- Stations: 8
- Website: srtet.co.th/index.php/en

Service
- Type: Commuter rail; Airport rail link
- Services: AERA1 City
- Operator: Asia Era One Company Limited
- Rolling stock: Siemens Desiro Class 360/3
- Daily ridership: 70,000

History
- Opened: 23 August 2010; 16 years ago

Technical
- Line length: 28.4 km (17.6 mi) (estimated); 48.6 km (30.2 mi) (planned)
- Num of tracks: 2
- Character: Elevated
- Track gauge: 1,435 mm (4 ft 8 1/2 in) standard gauge
- Electrification: 25 kV 50 Hz AC overhead catenary
- Operating speed: 120 km/h (75 mph)
- Signalling: Siemens Trainguard LZB700M fixed block ATC under ATO GoA 2 (STO)

The Airport Rail Link (ARL) (Thai: รถไฟฟ้าแอร์พอร์ต เรล ลิงก์) is an airport rail link line in Bangkok Metropolitan Region connecting Suvarnabhumi Airport to the city center. The commuter rail line starts at Suvarnabhumi station underneath the airport terminal, before ascending onto an elevated viaduct to Lat Krabang station where it meets the eastern line railway station of the same name. (Each Airport Rail Link station, except Suvarnabhumi and Ratchaprarop stations, is located above an eastern line railway station.) The line continues west, directly running above the eastern line railway for the rest of the line. It runs towards Ban Thap Chang station, then towards Hua Mak station where it meets Yellow Line, then towards Ramkhamhaeng station, then towards Makkasan station where it meets Blue Line, then towards Ratchaprarop station, then towards Phaya Thai station where the line terminates and meets Sukhumvit Line. It is owned by State Railway of Thailand (SRT) and, since 2021, operated by Asia Era One Company Limited. The 28.6-kilometer (17.8 mi)-long Airport Rail Link opened for service on 23 August 2010.

In the future, Airport Rail Link will extend from Phaya Thai towards Krung Thep Aphiwat Central Terminal and Don Mueang International Airport. Its rail will also be used for the proposed Don Mueang–Suvarnabhumi–U-Tapao high-speed railway.

== History ==
The airport link contract was signed in January 2005, and construction began in July 2005. The line was built by a consortium of B.Grimm, STECON, and Siemens. The cost of the project was 25.9 billion baht.

The line is built largely along the same alignment as the failed Bangkok Elevated Road and Train System (BERTS) project, which was started by Hopewell Holdings and ceased construction in 1997, when only 10 percent of the project had been completed. Many idle pillars left from BERTS stood in the way of the new system. After an extensive debate and an engineering review on their suitability for use in the ARL project—and demands for compensation from Hopewell—the SRT eventually decided to demolish the pillars and build new ones.

Originally scheduled to be completed by 2007, the Hopewell debacle, an extended bidding process, and a series of legal challenges from squatters and property owners who had encroached on SRT's land, repeatedly delayed the project. Initial test runs were conducted in October 2009, with a free limited trial service open to the public running from April 2010. Full commercial services were launched on 23 August 2010. It was initially operated by the S.R.T. Electrified Train Company (SRTET), a wholly owned subsidiary of the State Railway of Thailand (SRT).

In October 2021, operation of the line was transferred to a new special-purpose vehicle led by the consortium of Charoen Pokphand (CP) Holding and partners including Ch. Karnchang PLC. (CK), Bangkok Expressway and Metro PLC. (BEM), Italian-Thai Development PLC. (ITD) and China Railway Construction Corporation (CRCC) and the service rebranded as AERA1 City. The consortium will also operate the Don Mueang–Suvarnabhumi–U-Tapao high-speed railway.

=== High speed train Connecting 3 airports ===
Since its inception, the ARL was intended to be extended north to the new Krung Thep Aphiwat Central Terminal and ultimately Don Mueang International Airport (DMK). This would use the SRT Dark Red Line and main SRT north line corridor. The 21.8 km (13.5 mi) extension—3.5 km (2.2 mi) underground and 18.3 km (11.4 mi) elevated—would consist of five stations beyond the current terminus at Phaya Thai: Ratchawithi (underground), Krung Thep Aphiwat Central Terminal, Bang Khen, Laksi, and Don Mueang.

Originally, it was thought that work on the extension would not commence until after 2016. However, the Thai Cabinet designated a two-airport policy in March 2012 encouraging airlines, particularly low-cost carriers, to move to Don Muang Airport. This resulted in an advance of the ARL extension timeline. The SRT budgeted for the extension in its 2013 budget and the 27 billion baht extension was planned to be tendered in the latter half of 2013. The political crisis in the last three months of 2013 and early-2014 delayed any further progress of the project. The military coup of May 2014 resulted in a military administration which did not fund the project in 2014. The ARL was intended to be the backbone of a future high speed rail line (HSR) to Chonburi and Rayong – originally scheduled to be completed by 2018. The military coup of May 2014 subsequently resulted in deferring all HSR line proposals for a period of two years. Construction resumed along the elevated line to the station at Don Mueang International Airport in late 2016.

In February 2015, the Thai Cabinet approved a budget for land appropriation with the expectation that the extension would be tendered later in 2015. However, this did not occur and there was no advance on the project in 2016. In 2017 that the Thai Government decided that the new Eastern high speed line would originate at Don Muang Airport, and not Krung Thep Aphiwat Central Terminal. Thus, this project effectively became the ARL extension to Don Muang Airport as it will use the ARL track and stations.

In early 2018, the SRT stated that the Eastern HSR line section from Phaya Thai to Krung Thep Aphiwat and Don Mueang Airport is expected to be tendered by May 2018 with a 4 months auction period before the successful bidder is awarded. The cost of the project is estimated to be over 200 billion baht, of which the Thai Government will fund 123 billion baht and the private sector estimated to contribute 90 billion baht.

As of April 2020, the Don Mueang–Suvarnabhumi–U-Tapao rail connection was still described as is a "proposed railway". It has been envisaged to partly run as a high-speed line. In October 2021, state authorities announced that the link connecting all three airports will be ready in four years. In July 2022, the government announced construction would begin in October 2022, and be competed in 2026. However, as of 2024, construction has not yet started.

== Stations ==
The line is 28.6 km (17.8 mi) long and is elevated, running above the existing eastern railway, with an underground terminal at the airport. Commuter trips take 27 minutes from Phaya Thai to Suvarnabhumi Airport. Unlike most railways in Thailand, which use meter-gauge railways, the Airport Rail Link uses standard-gauge railways.

The Airport Rail Link is electrified via overhead lines at 25 kV 50 Hz AC. All stations were built to accommodate 10-car trains, and the express train platform of Makkasan station and all platforms at Suvarnabhumi are fitted with platform automatic screen doors. The top speed is 160 km/h (99 mph), but the short distances between the stations do not permit commuter services to reach that speed.

At Makkasan and Suvarnabhumi, both lines have their own tracks and platforms. At Hua Mak the express line can bypass the city line via a passing loop.

Services		Code	Station Name		Image	Opened	Platform Type	Transfers	Notes
City	Express	Code	English	Thai	Image	Opened	Platform Type	Transfers	Notes
●	●	A1	Suvarnabhumi	สุวรรณภูมิ		23 August 2010; 16 years ago	Double Island		Exit to Suvarnabhumi Airport
●	｜	A2	Lat Krabang	ลาดกระบัง.		23 August 2010; 16 years ago	Side	Connecting station to • SRT Eastern Line • SRT (future)	Exit to: • Wat Lat Krabang • Wat Lat Krabang School
●	｜	A3	Ban Thap Chang	บ้านทับช้าง		23 August 2010; 16 years ago	Side	Connecting station to • SRT Eastern Line • SRT (future)	
●	｜	A4	Hua Mak	หัวหมาก		23 August 2010; 16 years ago	Double Island	Connecting station to • SRT Eastern Line • MRT • SRT (future)	Exit to MaxValu Supermarket
●	｜	A5	Ramkhamhaeng	รามคำแหง		23 August 2010; 16 years ago	Side	Connecting station to • SRT Eastern Line • SRT (future)	Exit to: • UM Tower • Bang Kapi electrical substation • MEA Bang Kapi
●	●	A6	Makkasan	มักกะสัน		23 August 2010; 16 years ago	Double Island	Connecting station to • SRT Eastern Line • SRT (future) and Phetchaburi for • MRT • MRL (future)	Exit to: • Singha Complex • Don Bosco Technological College • Saint Dominic School • Srinakharinwirot University
●	｜	A7	Ratchaprarop	ราชปรารภ		23 August 2010; 16 years ago	Side	Connecting station to • SRT Eastern Line • SRT (future) • MRT (under construction)	Exit to: • Pratunam Market • Indra Square • Baiyoke Tower.
●	●	A8	Phaya Thai	พญาไท		23 August 2010; 16 years ago	Side	Connecting station to • BTS • SRT Eastern Line • SRT (future)	Exit to: • Phayathai Plaza • Bangkok Area Revenue Office 5 • C.P. Tower 3 • Department of Livestock Development

== Rolling stock ==
Nine four-car and three-car Siemens Desiro EMUs based on the British Rail Class 360 are used. The only significant difference from the UK units is a much larger air conditioning pod on the roof, providing extra cooling to cope with the Thai climate. As with other Class 360 units, the trains were built in Krefeld, Germany – and were delivered from 2007, and testing in Bangkok began in March 2008. On 15 May 2012 the Thai Cabinet approved a budget of 5.2 billion baht for the SRT to order seven new, four car sets of Siemens Desiro rolling stock to be delivered by 2014. However, as of June 2013 no orders for new rolling stock had been placed.

Four Express trains—four cars, red colour—were used for the two separate express service between Makkasan and Phaya Thai and Suvarnabhumi Airport. The fourth car is a baggage car with no passenger seating The other five City Line trains—three cars, blue colour—are used for commuter City Line service stopping at all eight stations on the Airport Line. Since the suspension of the Express Services in September 2014, all Express sets have been used as all stop City Line services. In 2017, the SRTET commenced refurbishment of the four Express trains to install seating in the fourth car in order to increase passenger capacity.

=== New rolling stock order ===
Approval was granted by the Transport Ministry (MOT) for the SRT to purchase seven new, four car sets of rolling stock in early 2012 due to overcrowding and the urgent need to provide extra rolling stock. During 2013, the MOT reviewed the purchase intention to consider cheaper Chinese rolling stock. In December 2013, the Thai Cabinet approved 4.9 billion baht for the seven new sets of rolling stock. As of mid-2014, a supplier had not been selected, but the SRT indicated its intention to invite bidders to tender for new rolling stock in September 2014. This was subsequently delayed with the SRT expecting to conduct an e-tender in April 2015 with a schedule to sign the contract by June 2015. However, a subsequent tender was suspended in 2016 after allegations of corruption surrounding the bidding process.

In early 2017, the SRT Deputy Director stated that the new rolling stock would be tendered and a contract signed by the end of 2017. However, in January 2018 the SRT stated that the purchase would be delayed until the finalisation of the Eastern high speed line tender as rolling stock for this line would be used on the extended ARL.

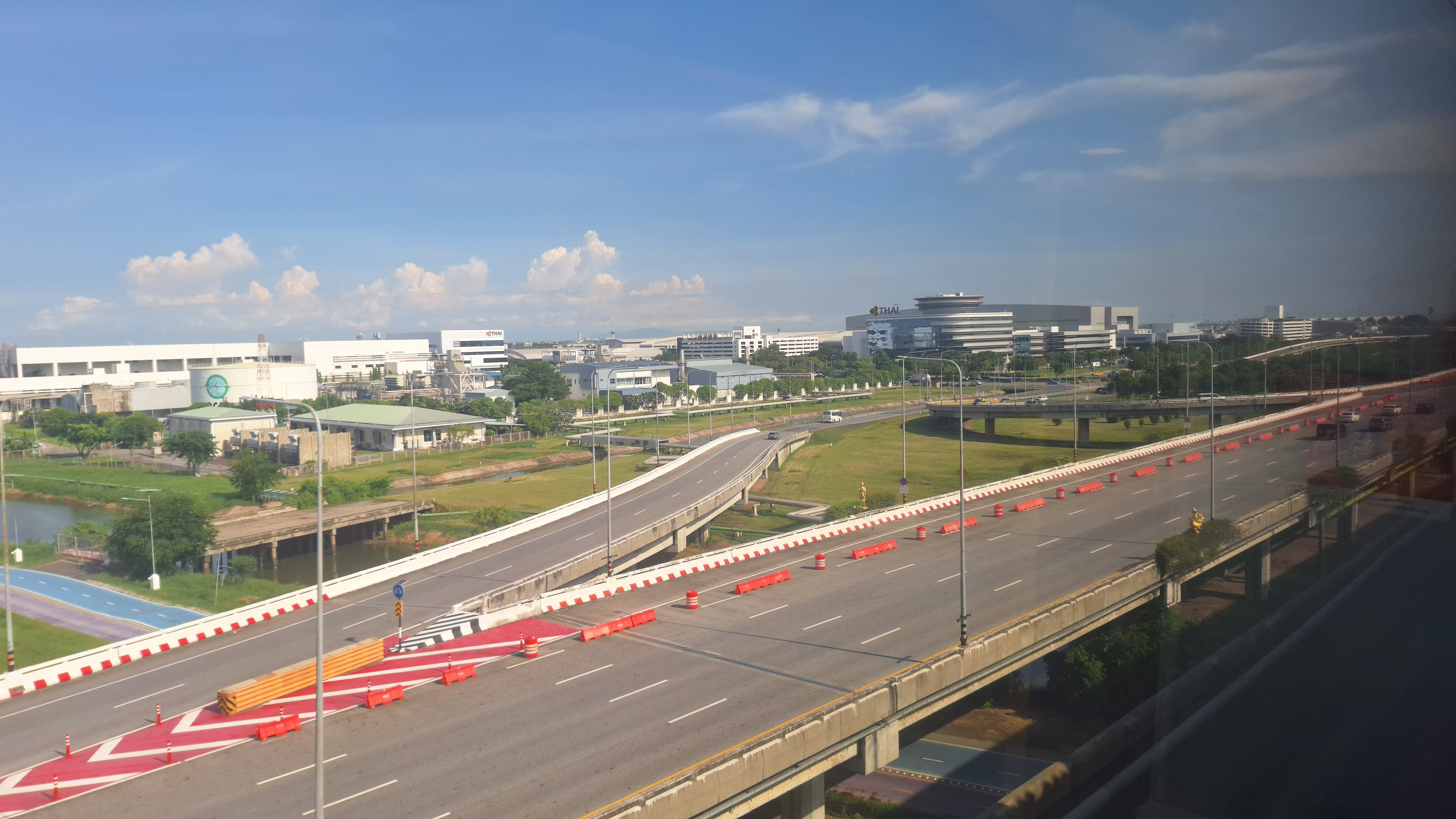
Train approaching Suvarnabhumi International Airport.

== Operation ==
=== Headways ===
Services originally consisted of both express services and the City Line, a commuter rail service with eight stations. However, since September 2014, all express services have been suspended indefinitely due to a shortage of rolling stock availability.

The ARL operates daily from 05:30 to 24:00, with services departing every 10–11 minutes during peak hours (06:00-09:00 and 16:00-20:00) and every 12–13 minutes off peak and weekends.

The number of passengers using the service in the first three years of operation was about half that projected. The SRT estimated about 95,000 passengers total per day, but the actual ridership was about 40,000, including 38,000 for the City Line and 2,500 for the Express Line. Airport Rail Link, a subsidiary of the SRT set up to operate the Airport Link services, has operated at a loss since the start of its operations. The ARL averaged around 56,000 passengers a day on weekdays and 40,000 a day on weekends in 2015.

=== Service patterns ===
==== City Line ====
The commuter/suburban City Line stops at all eight stations. It is used by many residents and students in the eastern suburbs as well as airport staff. The City Line has suffered from significant overcrowding since 2012. City Line units allow passengers to bring bicycles during off peak periods and on weekends, but excessively large bags for trips to the airport can be difficult during peak periods. The system has come under some local scrutiny for this.

==== Express Line ====
On 1 June 2011, additional Express Line services became available between Phaya Thai station and the airport with a journey time of 18 minutes. This resulted in two distinct Express Services: one to/from Phaya Thai with a 60-minute headway; and one to/from Makkasan Terminal also with a 60-minute headway. This was due to a design flaw in the original laying of the rail which meant that the Express Line track terminates at Makkasan and does not connect with the City Line track which run on the outer side of the Express line, to Phaya Thai. The SRT allocated 17m baht in Feb 2012 to rectify this problem. As of early 2018 the two tracks had still not been connected.

At the end of April 2014, the Phaya Thai Express service was suspended for 12 months due to insufficient rolling stock being available while long term, overhaul maintenance of the express rolling stock was undertaken. Thereafter, the hourly Makkasan Express service was only averaging 400 passengers a day. Subsequently, in September 2014 the SRTET decided to suspend the Makkasan Express due to low passenger numbers and insufficient rolling stock. There have been no Express Services since this time. It will eventually be replaced with high speed train services once the Don Mueang–Suvarnabhumi–U-Tapao high-speed railway is complete.

=== Fares ===
The City Line is priced between 15 and 45 baht, depending on distance.

Prior to suspension, the Express Line was priced at 90 baht for a single and 150 baht for a return.

Since 8 November 2025, fare payments can be made by tapping a contactless Visa, Mastercard, JCB or UnionPay credit, debit or prepaid card on the fare gates.

=== City Air Terminal check-in ===
From 4 January 2011, a baggage check-in service began for passengers traveling on flights operated by Thai Airways, 08:00–21:00. Passengers checking in at Makkasan station (the city air terminal) were required to purchase an Express Line ticket and check in at least between 3 and 12 hours prior to flight departure. Bangkok Airways discontinued baggage check-in service in this facility on 13 June 2011. However, very few passengers—20 or fewer per day—used the Makkasan station check-in service. The SRTET stated that they wanted to encourage further airlines to use the City check in service in early 2014 with a target of 1,000 people a day by late 2014. However, in July 2014 the SRTET stated that it would most likely cease check-in operations as only 10 people were using it a day with only 200 pieces of luggage checked in each month. The service was costing SRTET 5.27m baht a month. All check-in services ceased in September 2014 when the Express service was suspended.

=== Ridership ===
Airport Rail Link Ridership
Year	Quarter	Quarterly Ridership	Daily Ridership	Annual Ridership	Remarks
2010	Q1			Data not announced.	
2010	Q2			Data not announced.	
2010	Q3	Data not announced.		Data not announced.	Phaya Thai - Suvarnabhumi section officially opened on 23 August 2010.
2010	Q4	Data not announced.		Data not announced.	
2011	Q1	2,934,622	32,607	12,519,320	
2011	Q2	2,805,508	30,830	12,519,320	
2011	Q3	3,246,229	35,286	12,519,320	
2011	Q4	3,532,961	38,401	12,519,320	
2012	Q1	3,763,879	41,362	14,931,525	
2012	Q2	3,582,709	39,371	14,931,525	
2012	Q3	3,861,363	41,972	14,931,525	
2012	Q4	3,723,574	40,474	14,931,525	
2013	Q1	3,737,557	41,529	15,613,029	
2013	Q2	3,587,352	39,422	15,613,029	
2013	Q3	4,037,184	43,882	15,613,029	
2013	Q4	4,250,936	46,206	15,613,029	
2014	Q1	4,319,470	47,995	17,064,149	
2014	Q2	4,035,584	44,348	17,064,149	
2014	Q3	4,367,023	47,468	17,064,149	
2014	Q4	4,342,072	47,197	17,064,149	
2015	Q1	4,588,969	50,989	19,307,411	
2015	Q2	4,591,370	50,455	19,307,411	
2015	Q3	5,043,614	54,822	19,307,411	
2015	Q4	5,083,458	55,255	19,307,411	
2016	Q1	5,216,955	57,330	21,169,915	
2016	Q2	4,939,953	54,286	21,169,915	
2016	Q3	5,511,778	59,911	21,169,915	
2016	Q4	5,501,229	59,796	21,169,915	
2017	Q1	5,623,299	62,482	22,529,949	
2017	Q2	5,383,195	59,156	22,529,949	
2017	Q3	5,749,213	62,492	22,529,949	
2017	Q4	5,774,242	62,763	22,529,949	
2018	Q1	5,864,122	65,157	23,695,300	
2018	Q2	5,414,586	59,501	23,695,300	
2018	Q3	6,060,351	65,874	23,695,300	
2018	Q4	6,356,241	69,090	23,695,300	
2019	Q1	6,478,231	71,981	26,154,828	
2019	Q2	6,310,391	69,345	26,154,828	
2019	Q3	6,671,340	72,515	26,154,828	
2019	Q4	6,694,866	72,771	26,154,828	
2020	Q1	5,361,912	58,923	14,885,183	1st wave of COVID-19 outbreaks (January 2020 - May 2020)
2020	Q2	1,726,158	18,969	14,885,183	1st wave of COVID-19 outbreaks (January 2020 - May 2020)
2020	Q3	3,708,838	40,314	14,885,183	
2020	Q4	4,088,275	44,438	14,885,183	2nd wave of COVID-19 outbreaks (December 2020 - February 2021)
2021	Q1	2,816,301	31,293	7,997,681	2nd wave of COVID-19 outbreaks (December 2020 - February 2021)
2021	Q2	1,694,210	18,618	7,997,681	3rd wave of COVID-19 outbreaks (April 2021 - June 2021)
2021	Q3	1,088,065	11,827	7,997,681	4th wave of COVID-19 outbreaks (July 2021 - early 2022)
2021	Q4	2,399,105	26,078	7,997,681	
2022	Q1	2,512,790	27,920	15,825,943	
2022	Q2	3,429,651	37,689	15,825,943	
2022	Q3	4,691,205	50,992	15,825,943	
2022	Q4	5,192,297	56,439	15,825,943	
2023	Q1	5,442,591	60,474	22,556,694	
2023	Q2	5,259,244	57,794	22,556,694	
2023	Q3	5,897,634	64,105	22,556,694	MRT Yellow Line opened on 3 July 2023, Hua Mak station became a connecting station.
2023	Q4	5,957,225	64,753	22,556,694	
2024	Q1	6,065,761	66,657	24,193,675	
2024	Q2	5,693,980	62,572	24,193,675	
2024	Q3	6,170,038	67,065	24,193,675	
2024	Q4	6,263,896	68,086	24,193,675	
2025	Q1	6,343,259	70,481	24,501,757	Free public transportation policy was implemented between 25 and 31 January 2025. Train services were temporarily suspended due to the 2025 Myanmar earthquake on 28 March.
2025	Q2	5,655,748	62,152	24,501,757	
2025	Q3	6,122,235	66,547	24,501,757	
2025	Q4	6,380,515	69,354	24,501,757	As of December 2025.
2026	Q1	6,379,810	70,887	17,832,390	
2026	Q2	5,633,298	61,904	17,832,390	
2026	Q3	5,819,282	63,253	17,832,390	As of September 2026
2026	Q4			17,832,390	

== See also ==
- Mass Rapid Transit Master Plan in Bangkok Metropolitan Region
- SRT Dark Red Line
- SRT Light Red Line
- BTS Skytrain
- Sukhumvit Line
- Silom Line
- MRT (Bangkok)
- MRT Blue Line
- MRT Brown Line
- MRT Grey Line
- MRT Light Blue Line
- MRT Orange Line
- MRT Pink Line
- MRT Purple Line
- MRT Yellow Line
- Bangkok BRT
- Suvarnabhumi Airport Automated People Mover
