= Prawet district =

Prawet ประเวศ
- Khet
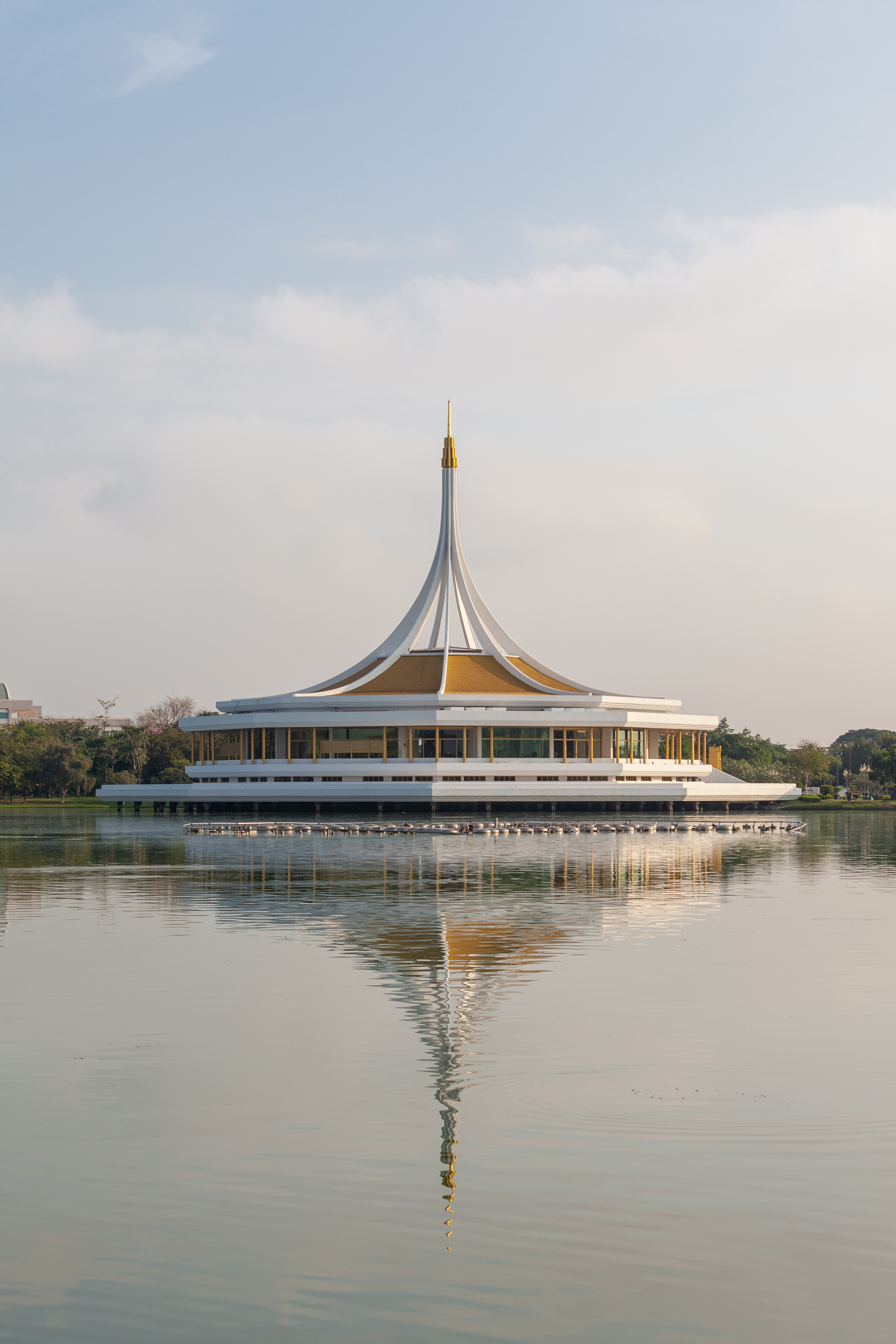
- Suan Luang Rama IX

- Khet location in Bangkok
- Coordinates: 13°43′1″N 100°41′40″E
- Country: Thailand
- Province: Bangkok
- Seat: Prawet
- Khwaeng: 3
- Khet established: 9 November 1989

Area
  - Total: 52.490 km^{2} (20.267 sq mi)

Population (2017)
  - Total: 175,656
  - Density: 3,346.47/km^{2} (8,667.3/sq mi)
- Time zone: UTC+7 (ICT)
- Postal code: 10250 (Dokmai, Mu 2-10 of Nong Bon: 10260)
- Geocode: 1032

Prawet (Thai: ประเวศ, pronounced [prā.wêːt]) is one of the 50 districts of Bangkok, Thailand. It is in the southeast. Neighboring districts are (from the east clockwise) Bang Phli (Samut Prakan province), Bang Na, Phra Khanong, Suan Luang, Bang Kapi, Saphan Sung and Lat Krabang (Bangkok). The district is best known for Paradise Park, Paradise Place, Seacon Square shopping malls; Srinagarindra Train Night Market; as well as Suan Luang Rama IX public park.

== History ==
Prawet was once part of Phra Khanong District. Prawet was elevated to become a separate district in 1989. Part of Prawet, especially the Suan Luang Sub-district, was carved out to establish Suan Luang District on 14 January 1994.

Its name after Khlong Prawet Burirom, a canal that flows through the northern area.

In October 2005 the plan to create the special administrative area Nakhon Suvarnabhumi around the new Bangkok airport became public. Prawet was supposed to be one of five districts to be included in this new area.

== Administration ==
The district is sub-divided into three sub-districts (khwaeng).

No.	Name	Thai	Area (km^{2})	Map
1.	Prawet	ประเวศ	22.805	Map
2.	Nong Bon	หนองบอน	14.513	Map
3.	Dokmai	ดอกไม้	15.172	Map
Total			52.490	Map

== Motto ==
The district's motto is "Prawet is green and shady, of particular note is Suan Luang Rama IX, the open university inculcates high moral values and helps to develop model citizens".

== Places ==
=== Education ===
- Pan-Asia International School
- Wells International School (Wells International Kindergarten Bangna Campus)

=== Place of worship ===
- Masjid Assa'adah
- Wat Kaeo Phithak Charoen Tham
- Wat Krathum Suea Pla
- Wat Taklam
- Yami Ul Ibadah (also known as Masjid Ban Tang Khawi)

=== Public park ===
- Chaloem Phrakiat Mahat Thai Park
- Nong Bon Water Sports Center
- PTT Metro Forest Learning Center
- Suan Luang Rama IX
- Suan Wanatham Park

=== Shopping ===
- Paradise Park (formerly Seri Center)
- Paradise Place
- Seacon Square
- Srinagarindra Train Night Market

== Transportation ==
Srinagarindra Road is a main artery of the district, Chaloem Phra Kiat Ratchakan Thi 9 and Phatthanakan with On Nut (Sukhumvit 77) as well as Sukhaphiban 2 Roads considered as a minor road. Kanchanaphisek Road (Outer Ring Road) passes through the eastern area.

Prawet is served by Ban Thap Chang Station of the State Railway of Thailand, whose eastern line and airport rail link runs past the area.

MRT Yellow Line passes through the district along the Srinagarindra road. Stations are Srinagarindra 38, Suan Luang Rama IX and Si Udom.

== Politics ==
Prawet is regarded as one of the Democrat Party's relatively strong support bases in eastern Bangkok, an area where the party is generally less popular overall, making this constituency a notable exception within the region. In the 2026 Bangkok Metropolitan Council election, which was held concurrently with the Bangkok gubernatorial election, the seat was retained by the incumbent council member, Thanawat Cherdchukitkul of the Democrat Party. He is the younger brother of Kitpol Cherdchukitkul, a long-serving former Bangkok Metropolitan Council (MC) member for Prawet, who also served as President of the Bangkok Metropolitan Council and later contested parliamentary elections in both 2023 and 2026.
