= Suvarnabhumi station =

Rapid transit station in Bangkok, Thailand

Suvarnabhumi Station สถานีสุวรรณภูมิ
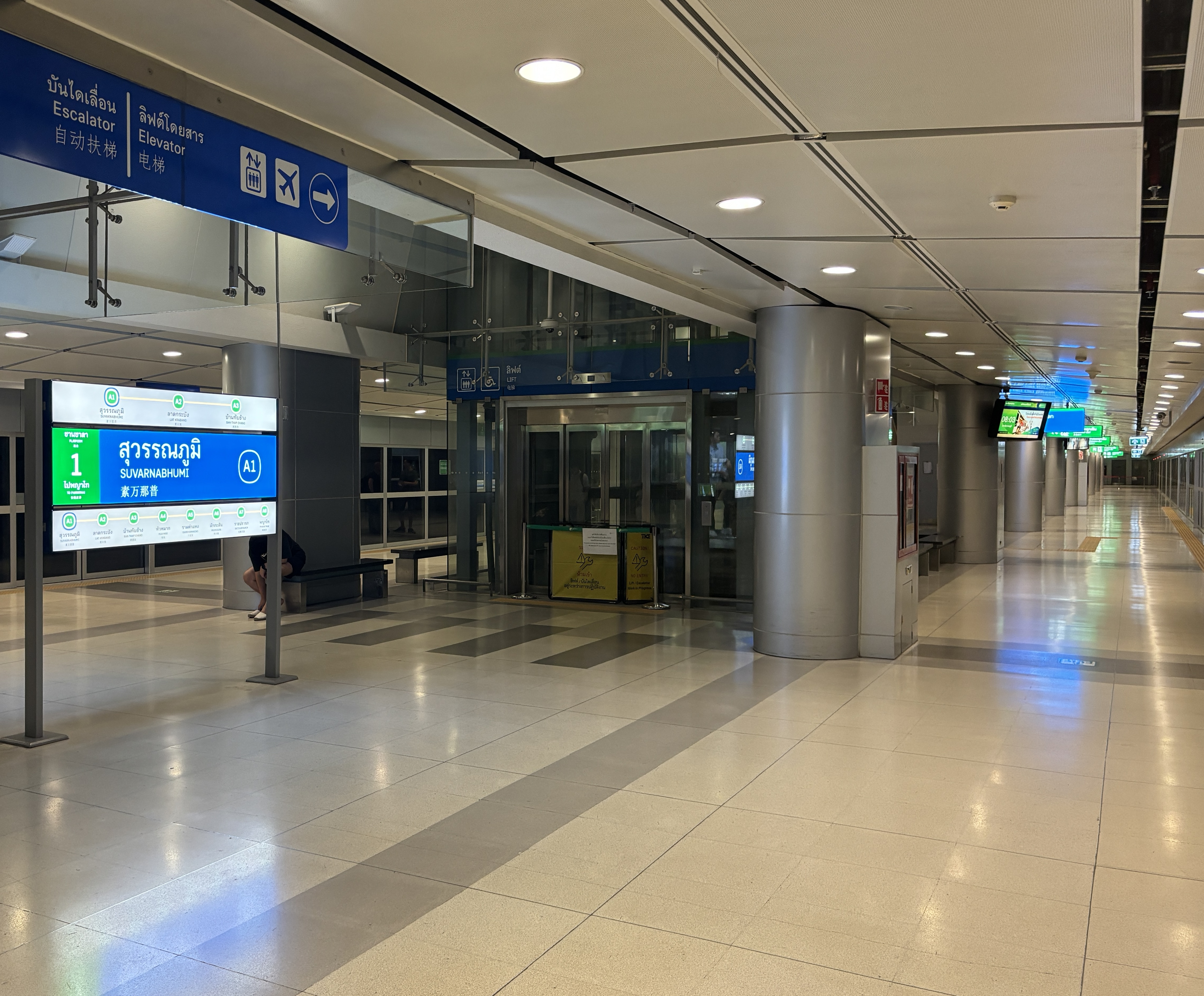

General information
- Location: Nong Prue, Bang Phli District; Samut Prakan; Thailand
- Coordinates: 13.6942°N 100.7511°E
- System: ARL
- Owner: Airports of Thailand
- Platforms: 4
- Tracks: 4

Construction
- Structure type: Underground

Other information
- Station code: A1
- IATA code: BKK
- Website: https://www.srtet.co.th/index.php/th/

History
- Opened: 23 August 2010; 16 years ago
- Electrified: 25 kV AC overhead line

Services
Preceding station	Airport Rail Link	Following station
Lat Krabang towards Phaya Thai	City Line	Terminus
Proposed
Makkasan towards Don Mueang	High-Speed Rail Linking Three Airports	Chachoengsao towards U-Tapao
Location

Suvarnabhumi Station (Thai: สถานีสุวรรณภูมิ, RTGS: Sathani Suwannaphum) is a rapid transit station on the Airport Rail Link. It serves the Suvarnabhumi Airport, Thailand, and is integrated with the passenger terminal. The station was opened in August 2010. It is also the easternmost rapid transit station in Bangkok at the present.

== Future Eastern HSR ==
The station is also considered as part of the High-Speed Rail Linking Three Airports Project that connects between Don Mueang International Airport and U-Tapao International Airport which use Airport Rail Link tracks.

== Layout ==
North ↔ South

B1; Ticket	Ticket counter	Exit 1-2, Ticket machines, Shops, Way to the Novotel
B2; Platforms	Platform 1	City Line towards Phaya Thai
B2; Platforms	Island platform
B2; Platforms	Platform 2	City Line towards Phaya Thai
B2; Platforms	Platform 3	HST Line towards Makkasan (platform out of service)
B2; Platforms	Island platform
B2; Platforms	Platform 4	HST Line towards Makkasan (platform out of service)

== Service time ==
Toward	First	Last
City Line (weekdays)
Phaya Thai	06.02	23.51
City Line (weekends)
Phaya Thai	06.11	23.51

- Note: Express Line is out of operation now.
