= Khlong Prawet Buri Rom =

Canal in Bangkok, Thailand

Coordinates: 13°42′53″N 100°38′19.99″E

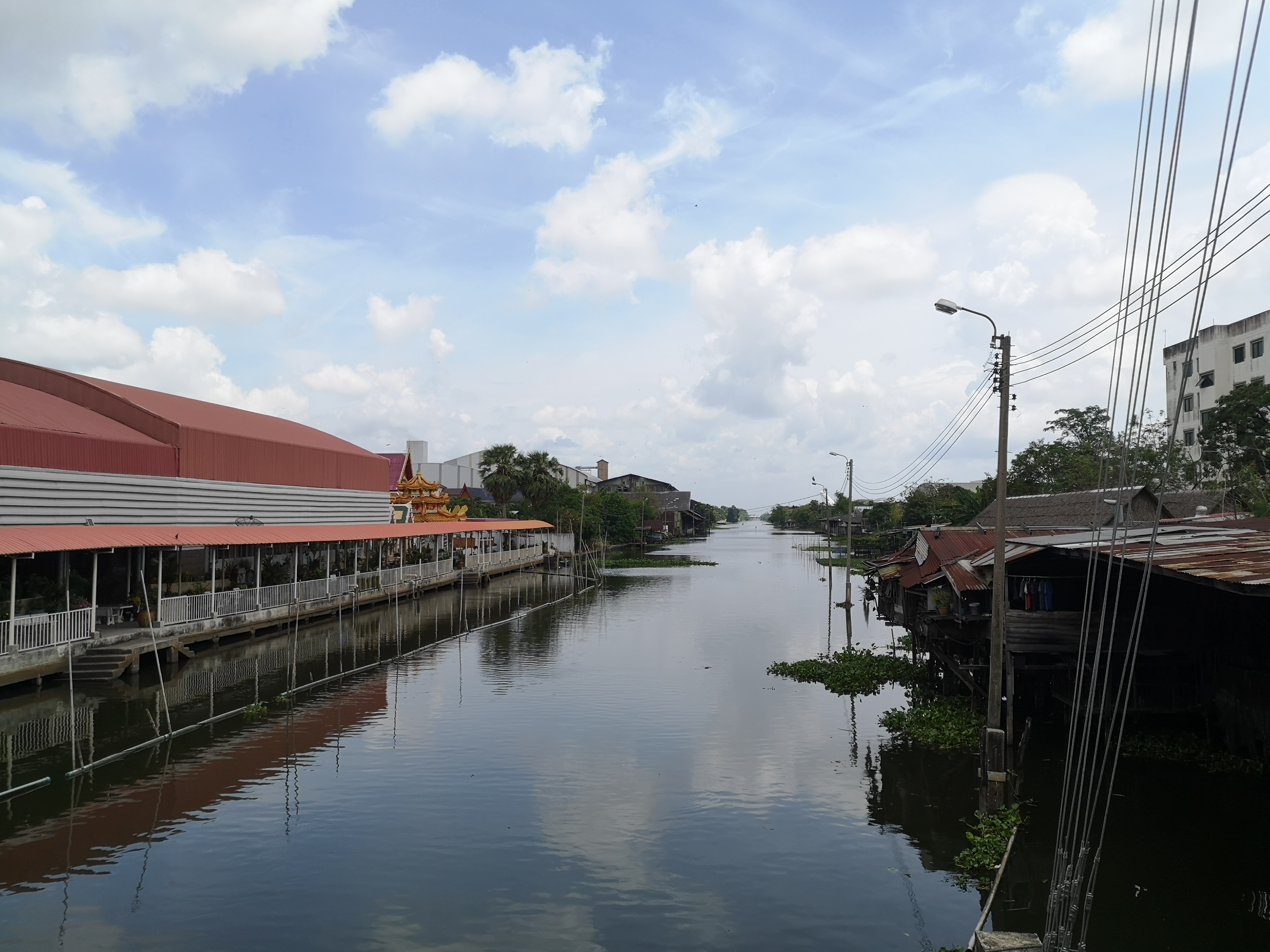
Khlong Prawet Buri Rom behind Wat Phon Mani in the area of Thap Yao

Khlong Prawet Buri Rom (Thai: คลองประเวศบุรีรมย์, pronounced [kʰlɔ̄ːŋ prà.wêːt bu.rīː rom]) is a khlong (canal) in east Bangkok.

After the khlong construction bill was promulgated in 1877, King Chulalongkorn (Rama V) ordered the extension of Khlong Phra Khanong to join Khlong Dan and link to the Bang Pakong River of Chachoengsao Province. The khlong was called Khlong Prawet Buri Rom (literally "canal that leads to the delightful city"). Excavations took three years to complete. The man-made khlong not only enabled water transportation between Nakhon Khuean Khan (present-day Phra Pradaeng) and Chachoengsao, but it opened up new croplands along its banks.

Prawet, one of the 50 districts of Bangkok, named after it.

Although Khlong Prawet Buri Rom has the potential to be a cultural and lifestyle attraction in Bangkok, as recently as 2015 it was avoided by locals "...as the water is too disgusting." The canal flows past Wat Krathum Suea Pla in Prawet District, Hua Takhe Market in Lat Krabang District, and Khlong Suan 100 Years Market, a 100-year-old traditional market on the border of Samut Prakan and Chachoengsao.
