= U-Tapao International Airport =

Commercial airport serving Pattaya, Thailand

U-Tapao–Rayong–Pattaya International Airport ท่าอากาศยานอู่ตะเภา ระยอง–พัทยา

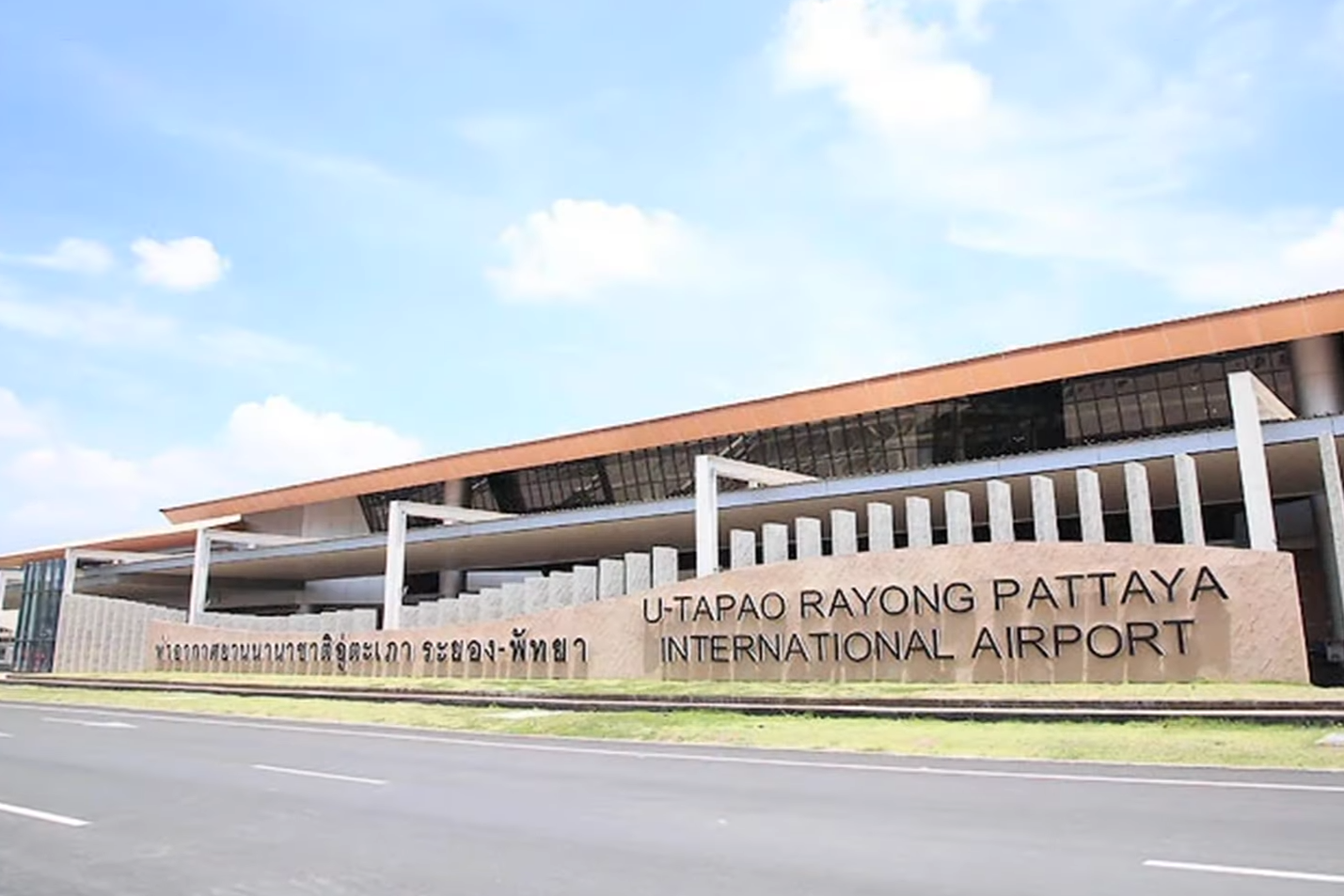
- IATA: UTP; ICAO: VTBU

Summary
- Airport type: Public / military
- Operator: Royal Thai Navy
- Serves: Chonburi and Rayong provinces
- Location: Ban Chang, Rayong, Thailand
- Opened: 2 June 1966; 60 years ago
- Hub for: Budgetline; Pattaya Airways
- Elevation AMSL: 13 m (43 ft)
- Coordinates: 12°40′47″N 101°00′18″E
- Website: www.utapao.com

Maps
- Location in Rayong Province Location in the Bay of Bangkok Location in Thailand
- Interactive map of U-Tapao–Rayong–Pattaya International Airport

Runways
Direction	Length		Surface
Direction	m	ft	Surface
18/36	3,505	11,500	Asphalt

Statistics (October 2023 - September 2024)
- Total passengers: 370,210 ▼0.17%
- International passengers: 227,506 ▼0.26%
- Domestic passengers: 142,704 ▲0.04%
- Aircraft movements: 5,788 ▼0.05%
- Source: DAFIF

U-Tapao–Rayong–Pattaya International Airport (IATA: UTP, ICAO: VTBU), also spelled Utapao and U-Taphao, is a dual-use civil–military public international airport serving the cities of Rayong and Pattaya in Eastern Thailand in the Ban Chang district of Rayong province. It also serves as the U-Tapao Royal Thai Navy Airfield, home of the Royal Thai Navy First Air Wing. U-Tapao is the home of a large Thai Airways maintenance facility, servicing that airline's aircraft as well as those of other customers.

== History ==
=== Vietnam War ===
U-Tapao was built by the United States to accommodate B-52 bombers for missions in Vietnam, Laos, and Cambodia during the Vietnam War. Construction began on 15 October 1965 and was completed on 2 June 1966. U-Tapao was the primary Southeast Asian airfield for USAF B-52 bombers, called "Bee-hasip-sawng" (B-52) by the local Thais. U-Tapao was a front-line base along with the other US bases at Korat, Udon, Ubon, Nakhon Phanom, and Takhli. The USAF B-52s made regular sorties over North Vietnam and North Vietnamese-controlled areas in Laos, carrying an average of 108 500-pound and 750-pound bombs per mission. U-Tapao was a regular stop on Bob Hope's Christmas shows for the troops.

=== Accidents and incidents ===
- On 28 October 1977, a Douglas DC-3 of Vietnam Airlines en route from Tan Son Nhat International Airport, Ho Chi Minh City, to Duong Dong Airport, Phu Quoc, Vietnam, was hijacked and diverted to U-Tapao Air Base to refuel. Two Vietnamese officials on the aircraft were killed in the hijacking.
- In 2008, with the temporary closure of Suvarnabhumi and Don Mueang airports in late November because they had been occupied by anti-government protestors, U-Tapao became for a time Thailand's main supplementary international gateway. Many airlines arranged special flights to and from U-Tapao to ferry international passengers stranded by the closure of the Suvarnabhumi Airport.

=== Concessions ===
In late 2018, King Power was awarded a ten-year contract to operate U-Tapao duty-free shops. A partnership between Thai retailer Central Department Store Company (Central Group) and DFS Group will manage retail shops and services, mainly food and beverage, also for 10 years.

== Airlines and destinations ==
Airlines	Destinations
Bangkok Airways	Koh Samui, Phuket

== Location and transport ==
U-Tapao Airport near Sattahip on the Gulf of Thailand, about 50 kilometres (31 mi) south of Pattaya's Walking Street, is 140 kilometres (87 mi) south of Bangkok's Suvarnabhumi Airport and 190 kilometres (120 mi) south of Bangkok's Don Mueang Airport.

- Bus
  - From Suvarnabhumi Airport Level-1 (Ground Floor) near Gate-8, buses are available to Pattaya's North Pattaya Bus Terminal (6 km north of Walking Street) and the Pattaya Jomtien Bus Station (4 km south of Walking Street).
  - From Don Mueang Airport's (DMK) first-floor of terminal from platform 4-5, buses are available to Pattaya taking 2 hours 30 minutes travel time with drop off points in Pattaya at North Pattaya Junction, Central Pattaya Junction, South Pattaya Junction, and Thepprasit Junction.

- Highway:
  - Motorway 7 connects Pattaya to Bangkok.

- Rail
  - U Tapao Airport will be directly connected to the Suvarnabhumi Airport and Don Mueang International Airport, both in Bangkok, via the under-construction Don Mueang–Suvarnabhumi–U-Tapao high-speed railway linking Thailand's top 3 busiest airports.

== Future: airport expansion plan ==
Expansion plan was envisaged in 2018, project financing for the 6 phase development plan with annual passenger capacity of 60 million was approved in 2022, and partial implementation of phase-1 commenced in November 2025 with commencement of construction of the second runway.

Since Bangkok's two international airports are operating beyond capacity, the government envisaged to expand U-Tapao into a third major airport of Thailand. Consequently, U Tapao Terminal 2 was officially opened in February 2019. The 2022 Thai Government approved 6 phase expansion plan for U-Tapao Airport, envisages its annual passenger capacity to 60 million with runway expansions, several new and better connectivity to the Eastern Economic Corridor. In 2025, the partial implementation of phase-1 of U Tapao Airport expansion plan was scaled down from 6 million to 3 million passengers per year due to the delay in construction of Don Mueang–Suvarnabhumi–U-Tapao high-speed railway (High-Speed Rail Linking Three Busiest Airports of Thailand), and the full phase-1 with 6 million passenger capacity will be implemented once the 80% of High Speed Rail passenger numbers target is achieved.

After much delay, U-Tapao Airport expansion and Eastern Aviation City construction project is reported to begin on 3 April 2026. The project is led by U-Tapao International Aviation Co., Ltd. (UTA), wherein Bangkok Airways and BTS Group each holds 40%, and Stecon Group holds the remaining 20%.

== See also ==
- Airports of Thailand
