= Suan Luang Rama IX =

Public park in Bangkok, Thailand

Coordinates: 13°41′18″N 100°39′48″E

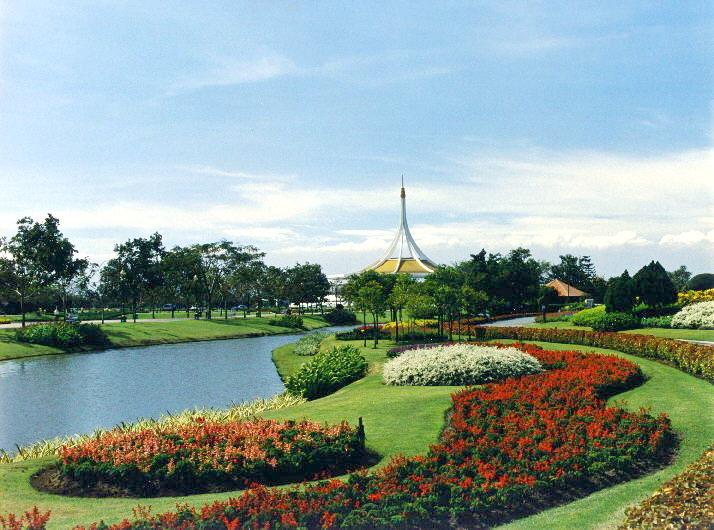
The park in 1998

Suan Luang Rama IX (Thai: สวนหลวง ร.9, pronounced [sǔan lǔaŋ rɔ̄ː kâːw], RTGS: Suan Luang Ro Kao), also referred to as (King) Rama IX Park, is a public park in Bangkok's Prawet District. With an area of 500 rai (80 ha; 200 acres), it is the largest park in the city.

The park was built to celebrate King Bhumibol Adulyadej's sixtieth birthday in 1987, and was opened by the King on 1 December that year. It features extensive botanical gardens, a lake, and a pavilion housing exhibits in honour of the King. The park is managed by the Suan Luang Rama 9 Foundation.

The "Phanmai Ngam Aram Suan Luang Ror Kao" (Beautiful Flora in the Suan Luang Rama IX Park) fair is held annually here in December since 1987, the year it was founded.

Although the park is the namesake of the Suan Luang Rama IX MRT station on the Yellow Line, the distance between the station and the park is over 1km.
