= Phaya Thai station =

Railway station in Bangkok, Thailand

Phaya Thai พญาไท
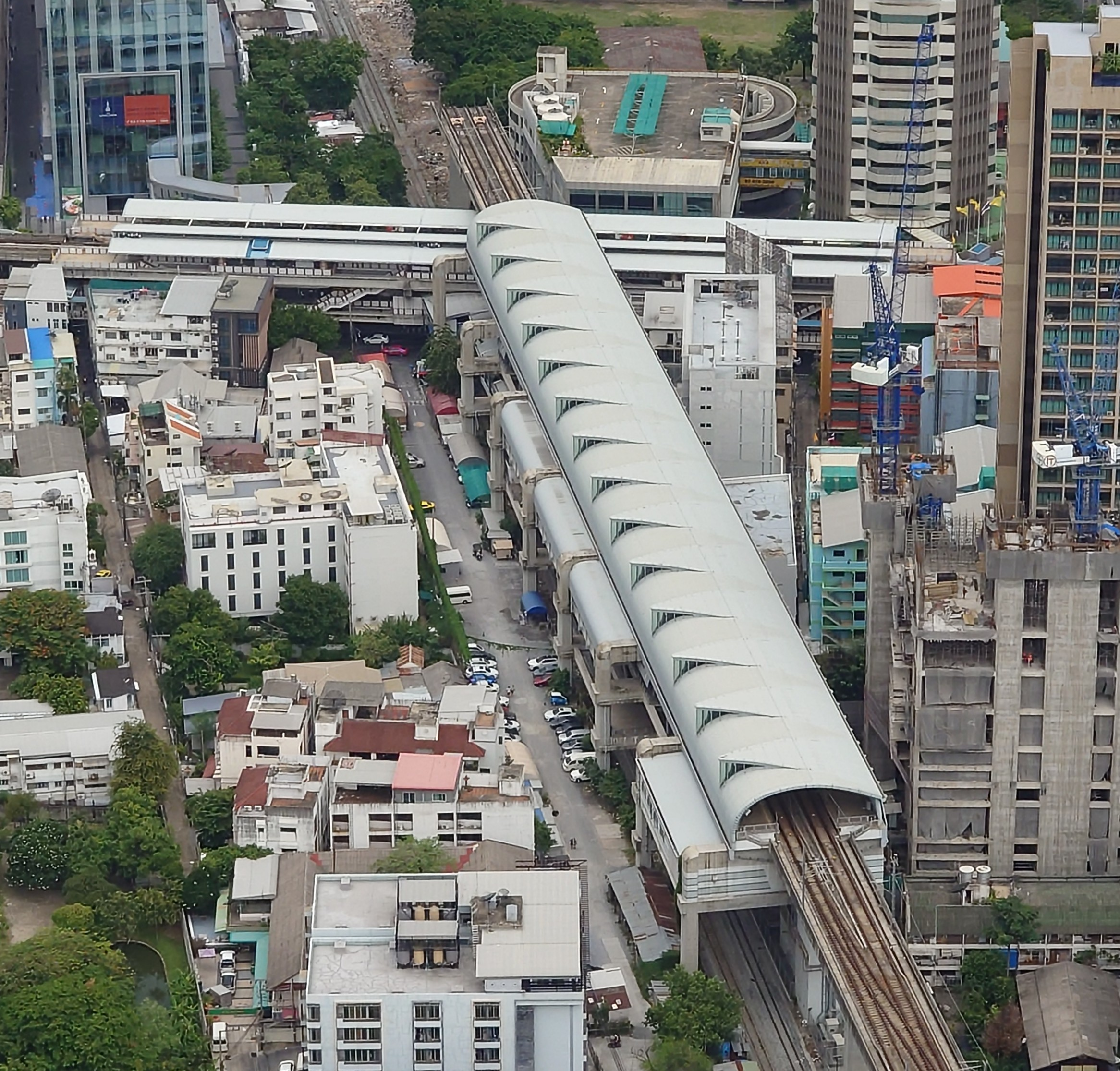
- Station aerial view

General information
- Location: Ratchathewi; Bangkok; Thailand
- Coordinates: 13°45′24.99″N 100°32′1.84″E
- System: ARL BTS
- Owner: Bangkok Metropolitan Administration (BMA); BTS Rail Mass Transit Growth Infrastructure Fund (BTSGIF) (BTS SkyTrain); State Railway of Thailand (SRT) (ARL)
- Operator: Bangkok Mass Transit System; Public Company Limited (BTSC) (BTS SkyTrain); Asia Era One Company Limited (AERA1); State Railway of Thailand (SRT) (Airport Rail Link)

Other information
- Station code: Airport Link: A8; Sukhumvit Line: N2; Eastern Line: ญท.

History
- Opened: 24 January 1907; 119 years ago (SRT); 5 December 1999; 26 years ago (BTS Skytrain); 23 August 2010; 16 years ago (Airport Rail Link)

Passengers
- 2021: 2,475,681 (BTS)

Services
Preceding station	BTS Skytrain	Following station
Victory Monument towards Khu Khot	Sukhumvit Line	Ratchathewi towards Kheha
Preceding station	Airport Rail Link	Following station
Terminus	City Line	Ratchaprarop towards Suvarnabhumi
Preceding station	State Railway of Thailand	Following station
Urupong Halt towards Hua Lamphong	Eastern Line	Makkasan towards Chuk Samet or Poipet (Cambodia)
Location

Phaya Thai station (Thai: สถานีพญาไท, pronounced [sā.tʰǎː.nīː pʰā.jāː tʰāj]) is a rapid transit station on the Airport Rail Link, BTS Sukhumvit Line and a railway halt on the Eastern Line in Ratchathewi District, Bangkok, Thailand. The Airport Rail Link station is located above the intercity Eastern Line at a level crossing on Phaya Thai Road. The station is surrounded by the government buildings, office towers and condominiums along Phaya Thai and Si Ayutthaya Road. Suan Pakkad Palace (Thai: วังสวนผักกาด), a traditional Thai antiques Museum and gallery is located nearby to the east of the station.

The station is the terminus of the Airport Rail Link City Line to Suvarnabhumi Airport.

== History ==
=== SRT ===
Phaya Thai opened as a halt on 24 January 1907 on the Eastern Line between Bangkok (Hua Lamphong) and Chachoengsao Junction, operated by the State Railway of Thailand. In recent years, the halt has been criticised for neglect and poor maintenance by the SRT as the tracks are being handed over for construction of the Don Mueang–Suvarnabhumi–U-Tapao high-speed railway.

=== BTS ===
Phaya Thai BTS station opened as part of the BTS Sukhumvit Line on 5 December 1999.

=== Airport Rail Link ===
Phaya Thai ARL station opened on 23 August 2010, along with a skywalk connecting it to the BTS station.

== Gallery ==
Phaya Thai Station (BTS) Traditional sign

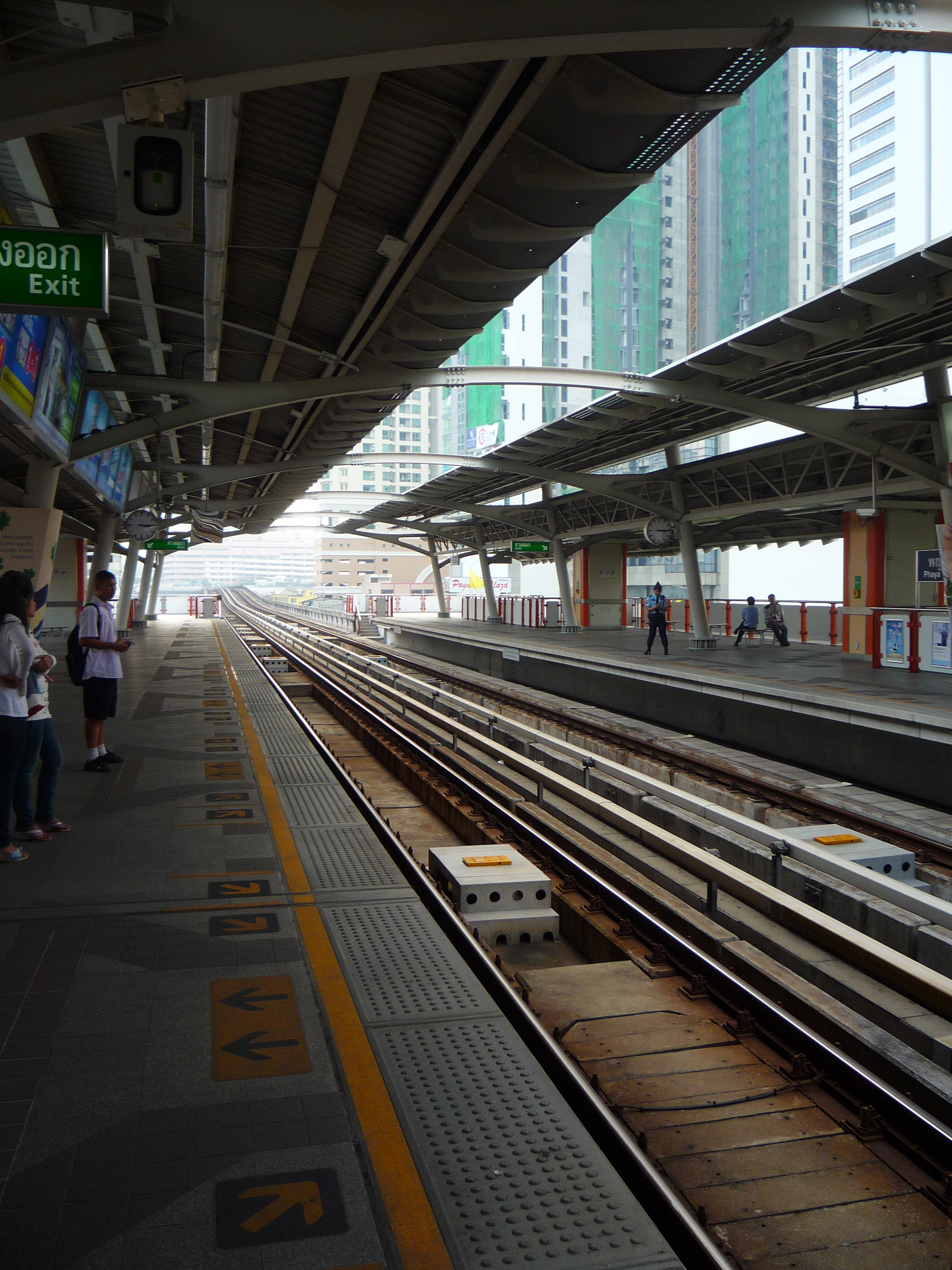
BTS Station platform

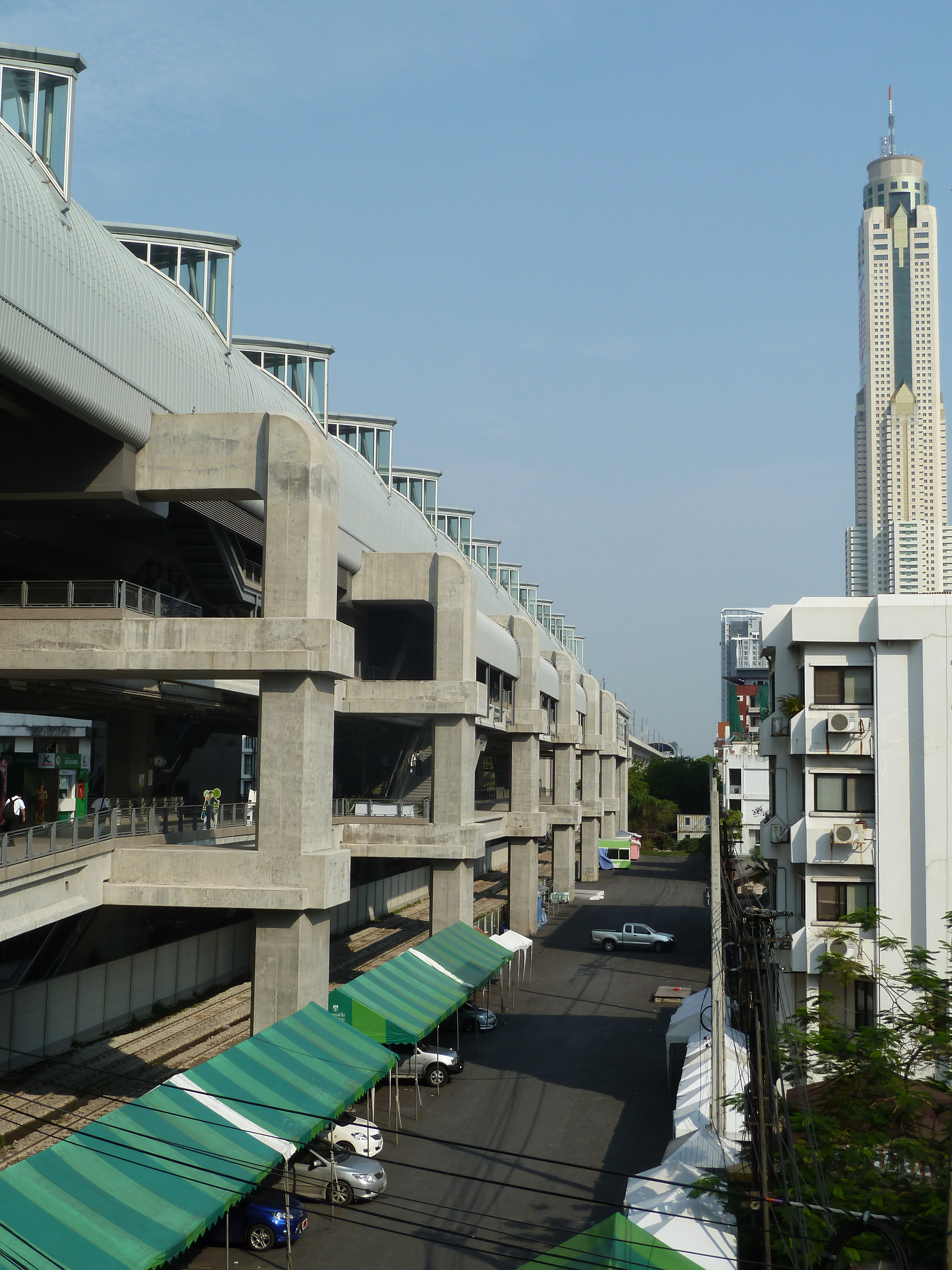
ARL Station

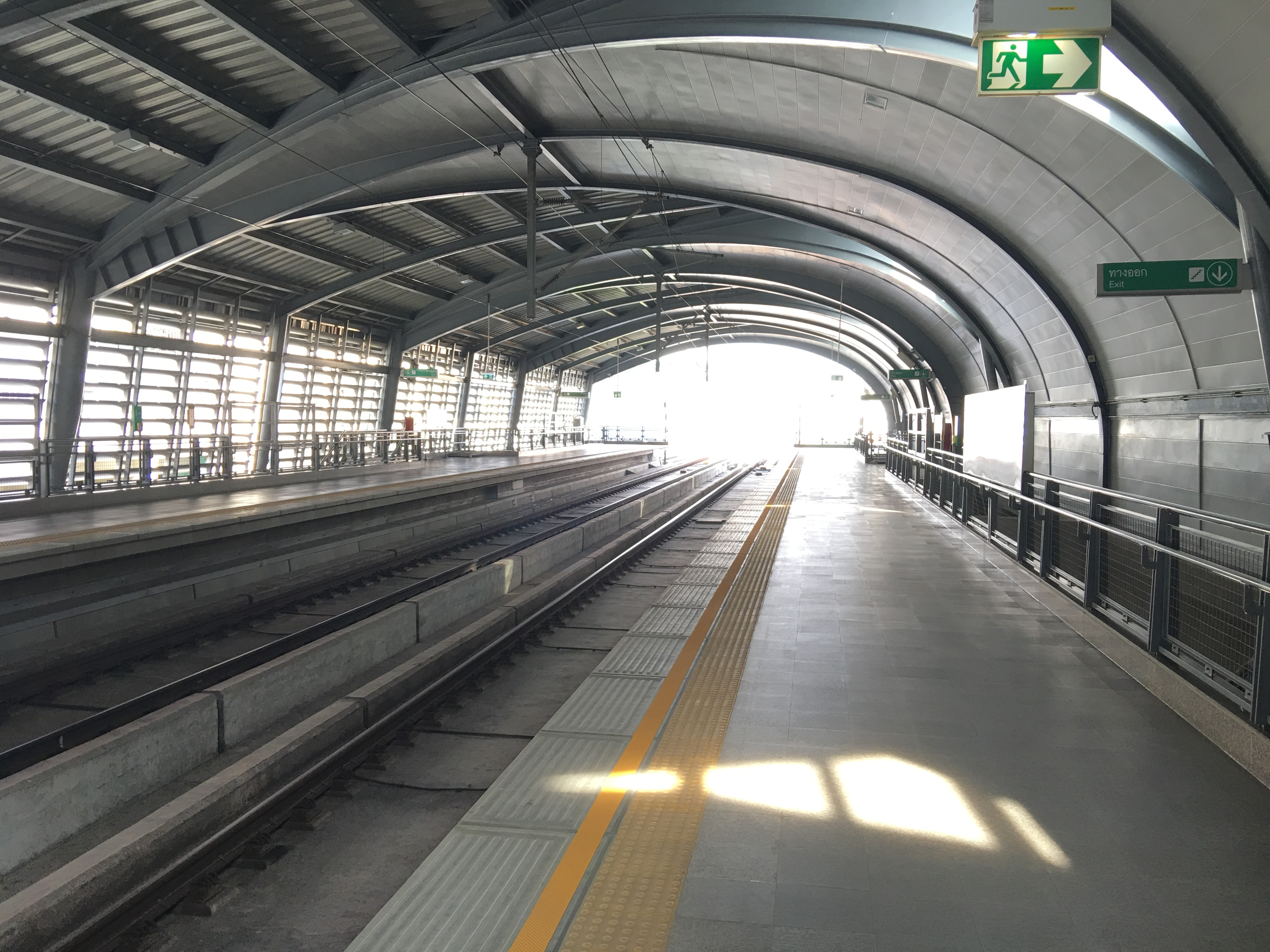
ARL Station platform

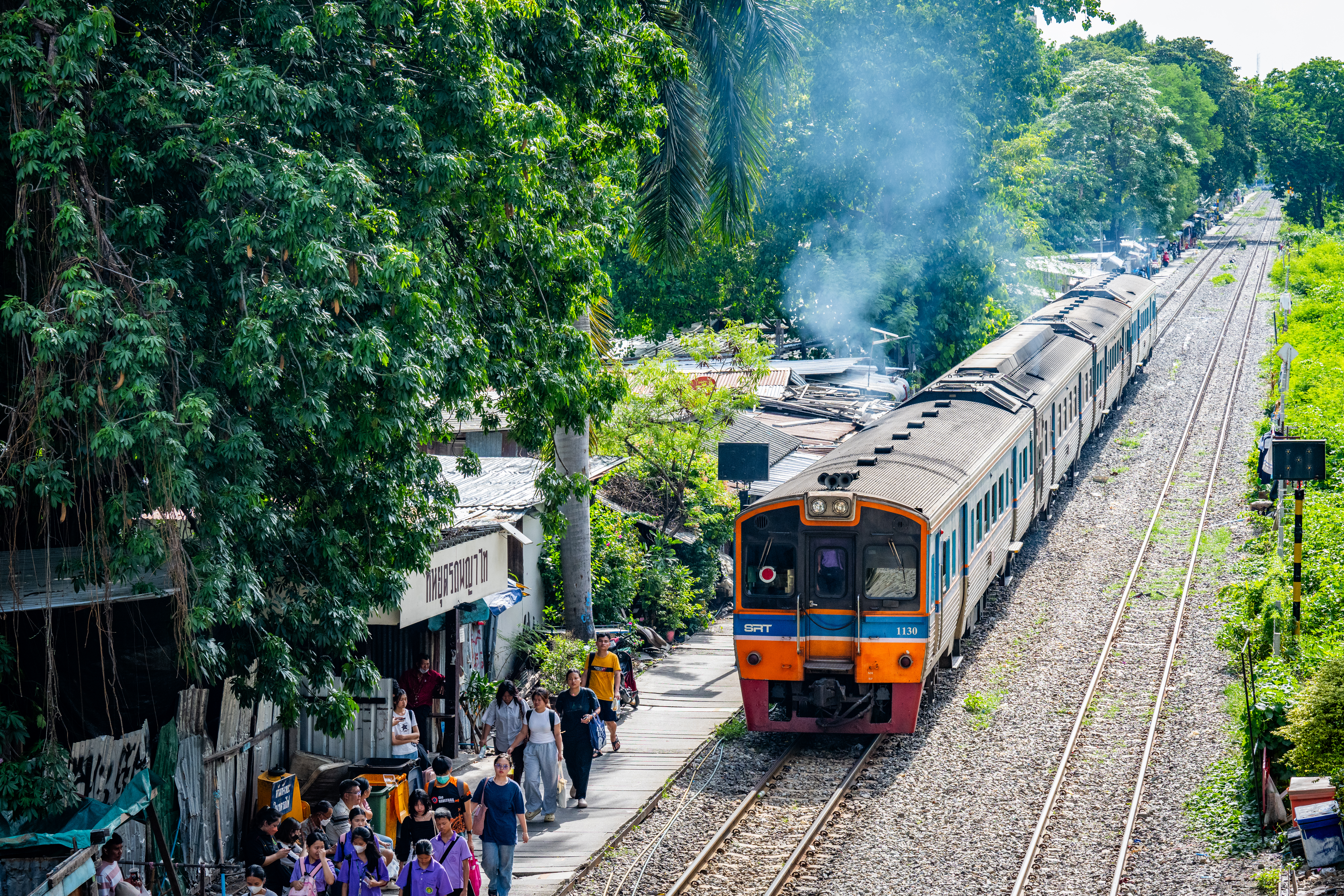
Phaya Thai halt

== See also ==
- Suvarnabhumi Airport Link
