= Nong Bon, Bangkok =

Nong Bon หนองบอน
- Khwaeng
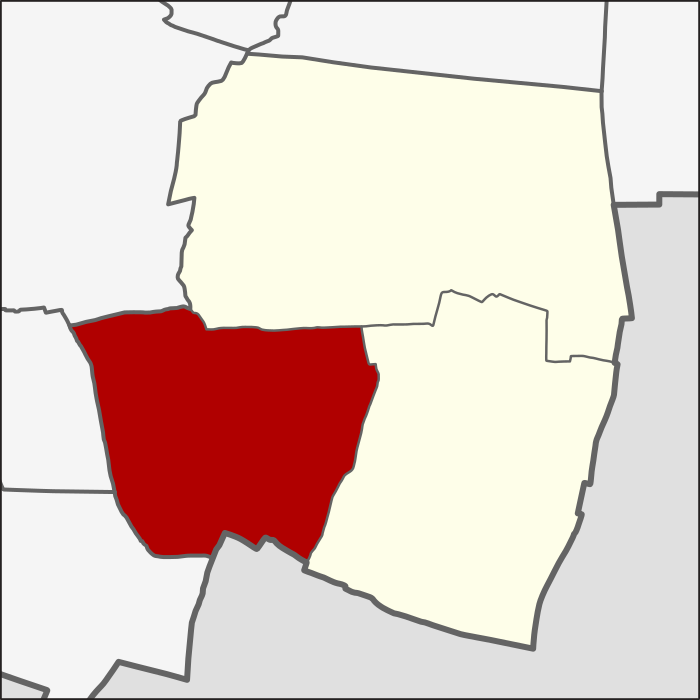
- Location in Prawet District
- Country: Thailand
- Province: Bangkok
- Khet: Prawet

Area
  - Total: 14.513 km^{2} (5.604 sq mi)

Population (2020)
  - Total: 41,429
- Time zone: UTC+7 (ICT)
- Postal code: 10250
- TIS 1099: 103202

Nong Bon (Thai: หนองบอน, pronounced [nɔ̌ːŋ bɔ̄ːn]) is a khwaeng (subdistrict) of Prawet District, in Bangkok, Thailand. In 2020, it had a total population of 41,429 people.
