= State Railway of Thailand THN =

Passenger train used in Thailand

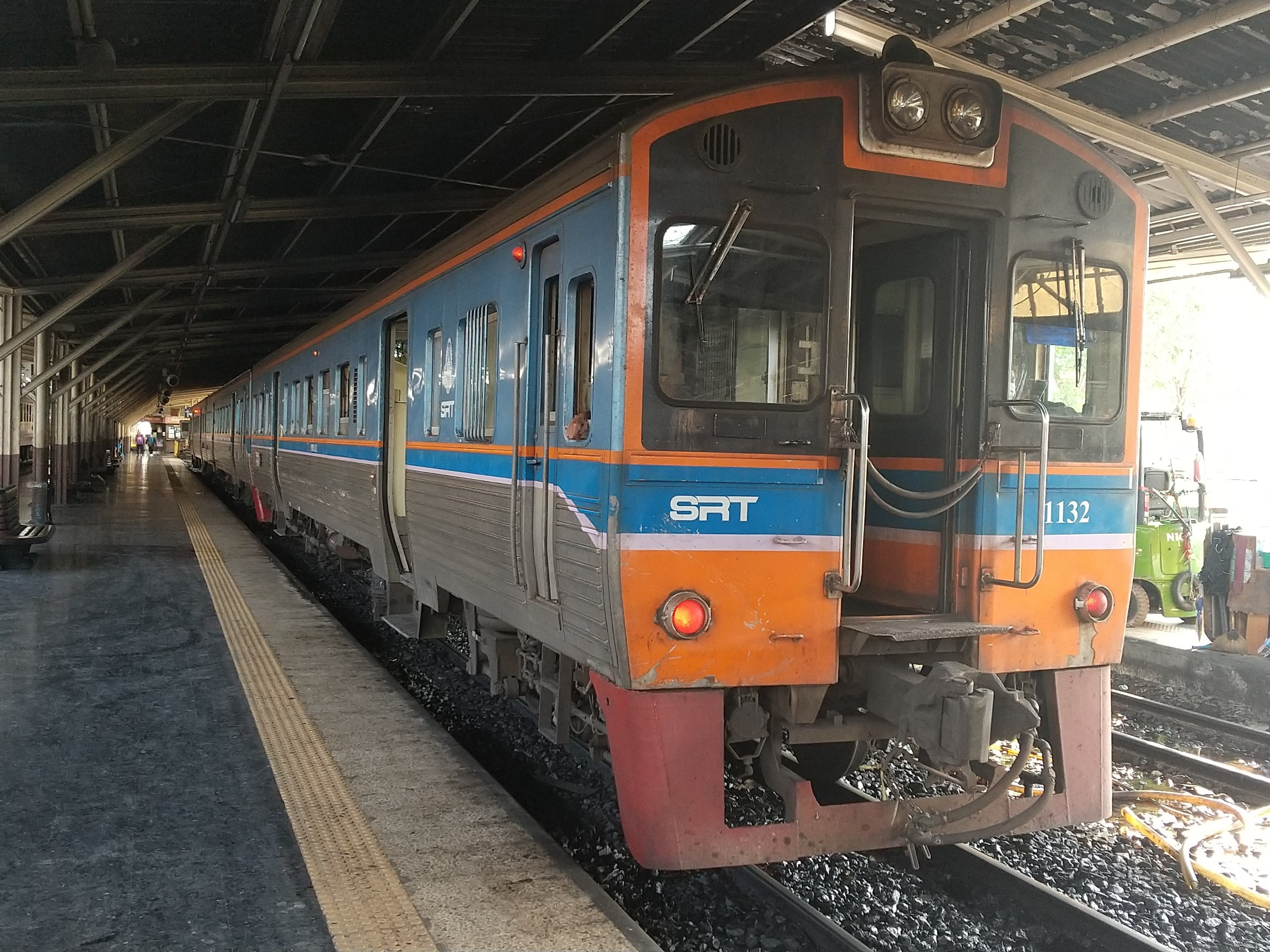
- A Tokyu THN in the 2011 livery at Hua Lamphong (Bangkok) station
- Stock type: Diesel Multiple Unit (DMU)
- In service: 1983 - present
- Manufacturers: Tokyu Car Corporation, Hitachi and Nippon Sharyo
- Number built: 40 units
- Fleet numbers: 1101 - 1140
- Lines served: Southern Line, Northeastern Line, Northern Line, Eastern Line, and the Maeklong Railway

Specifications
- Car body construction: Stainless Steel
- Car length: 20.8 meters
- Width: 3.73 meters
- Height: 2.815 meters
- Doors: automatic, 4 doors/car, 2 on each side
- Maximum speed: 105 km/h
- Prime mover: Cummins N855-R2
- Power output: 235 horsepower at 2100 rpm
- Track gauge: 1000 mm (Meter Gauge)

The THN is a 3rd class fan only Diesel Multiple Unit operated by the State Railway of Thailand (SRT) on all railway lines, including the Wongwian Yai-Mahachai portion of the Maeklong Railway.

== Service history ==
The first THN cars were unloaded at Khlong Toei Port in early 1983, with copyrighted pictures of the delivery on facebook posts in Thai. From July and August of 1983, THN cars, along with the NKF, became the backbone of Northern Line and Northeastern Line Local and Ordinary services. They were also deployed on Suburban and Express trains, running alongside the near identical NKF units. From the late 1990s to 2010s, their role began to shift from Ordinary and Suburban trains out of Hua Lamphong (Bangkok Railway station) to trains out of Thon Buri Railway Station on the Southern Line and the Mahachai-Wongwian Yai section of the Maeklong Line. A few units were still assigned to express trains like 75/76 (Bangkok-Nong Khai-Bangkok). From the mid 2020s onward, they are to be retired from express trains, succeeded by new DEMUs, and cascaded to Local trains, short shuttles and the Maeklong Line Wongwian Yai-Mahachai section.

== Praises and problems ==
Same as the NKF, Passengers praised the THN units for their futuristic look at the time as the stainless steel body was unpainted, fast acceleration, braking, and punctuality compared to locomotive hauled trains. But passengers complained that the stainless steel bodies felt like ovens when the train idled at platforms in the hot afternoon. The passengers also complained of the non-reclining, plastic or leatherette bench seats was extremely uncomfortable for passengers taking the express trains. Elderly passengers even complained of back pain. The trains were also extremely crowded during rush hour commute.

== Prototype TNH unit ==
Before the THNs were put into service, a prototype was made, called the TNH. The TNH had many problems, such as excessive vibrations. The THN was later built with many modifications fixing the issues.

== Use ==
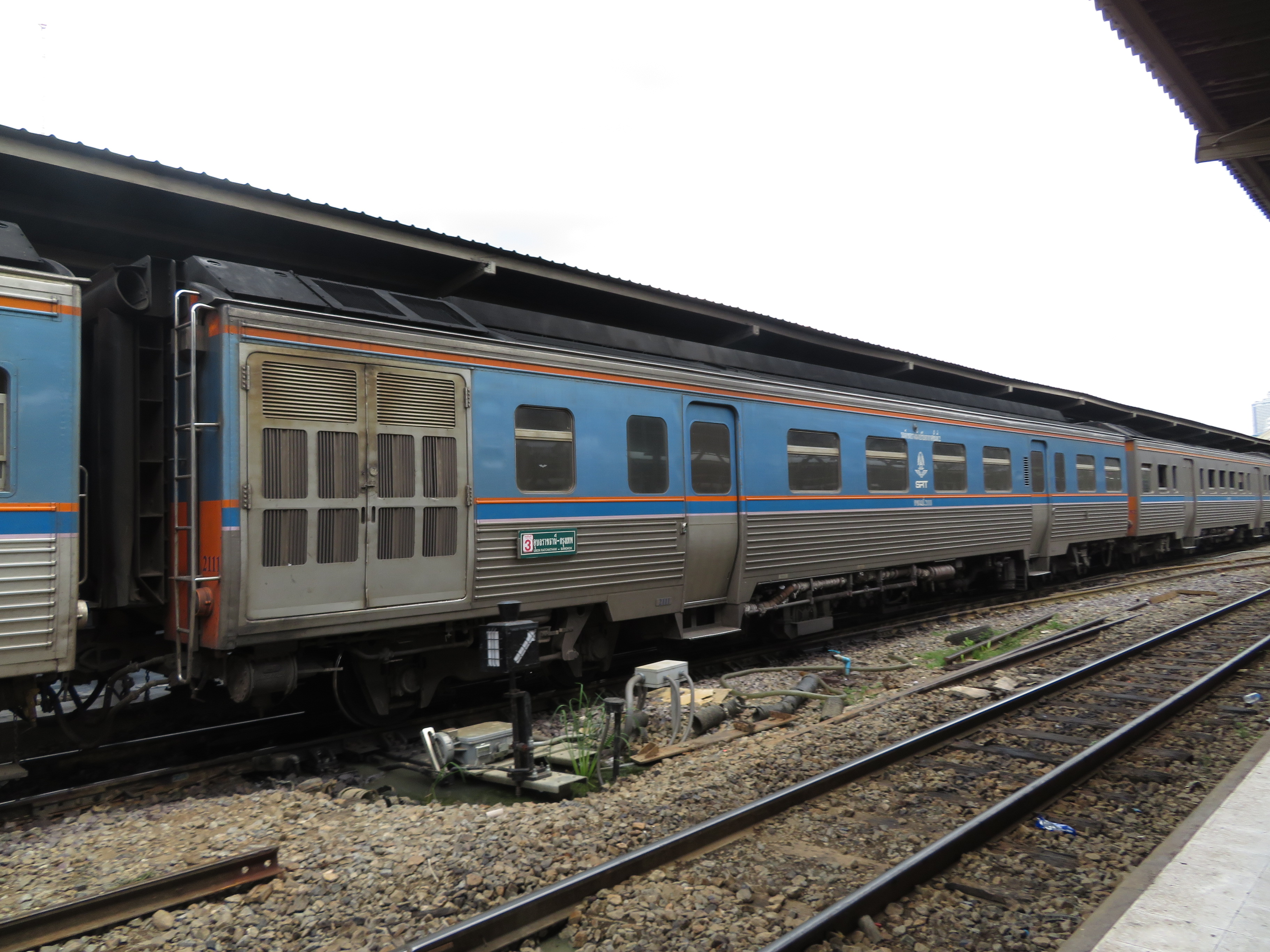
The THN being used in conjunction with the ATR

The THN can be coupled to other THN units, NKF units, ATR units, and RHN units. It is common to see it coupled to NKF units and ATR units on suburban trains and all the time on express trains.

== Recorded accidents ==
=== 1st accident ===
At approximately 5:40 am on 30 May 2016, at the level crossing at Thung Bua-Phanom Thuan road, Moo 2, Thung Bua Subdistrict, Kamphaeng Saen District, Nakhon Pathom Province on the Southern Line, a truck collided with unit number 1112 performing Train 356. The body and frame was twisted and deformed. The NKF unit numbers 1252 and 1254 were derailed and suffured minor damage. Miraculously, only 3 people were injured and no casualties were recorded.

=== 2nd accident ===
On an unknown date and unknown time (info not released by SRT), Unit 1127 caught fire due to a mechanical failure causing the fire. The crew had to make an emergency stop and evacuate passengers and put out the fire. There were 0 injuries and casualties.

== Gallery ==
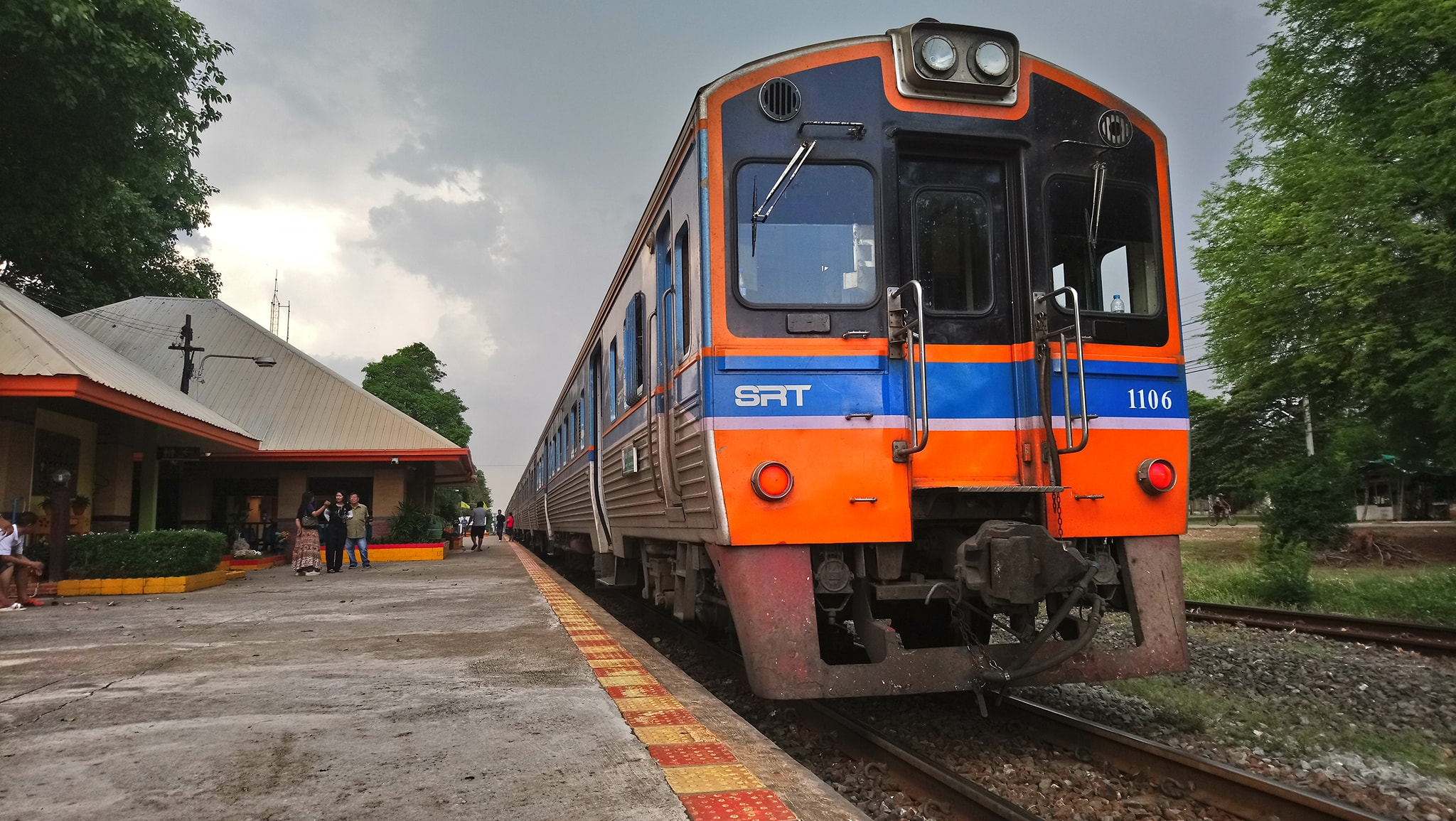
THN Unit 1106 at Sikhio Train Station performing train 71

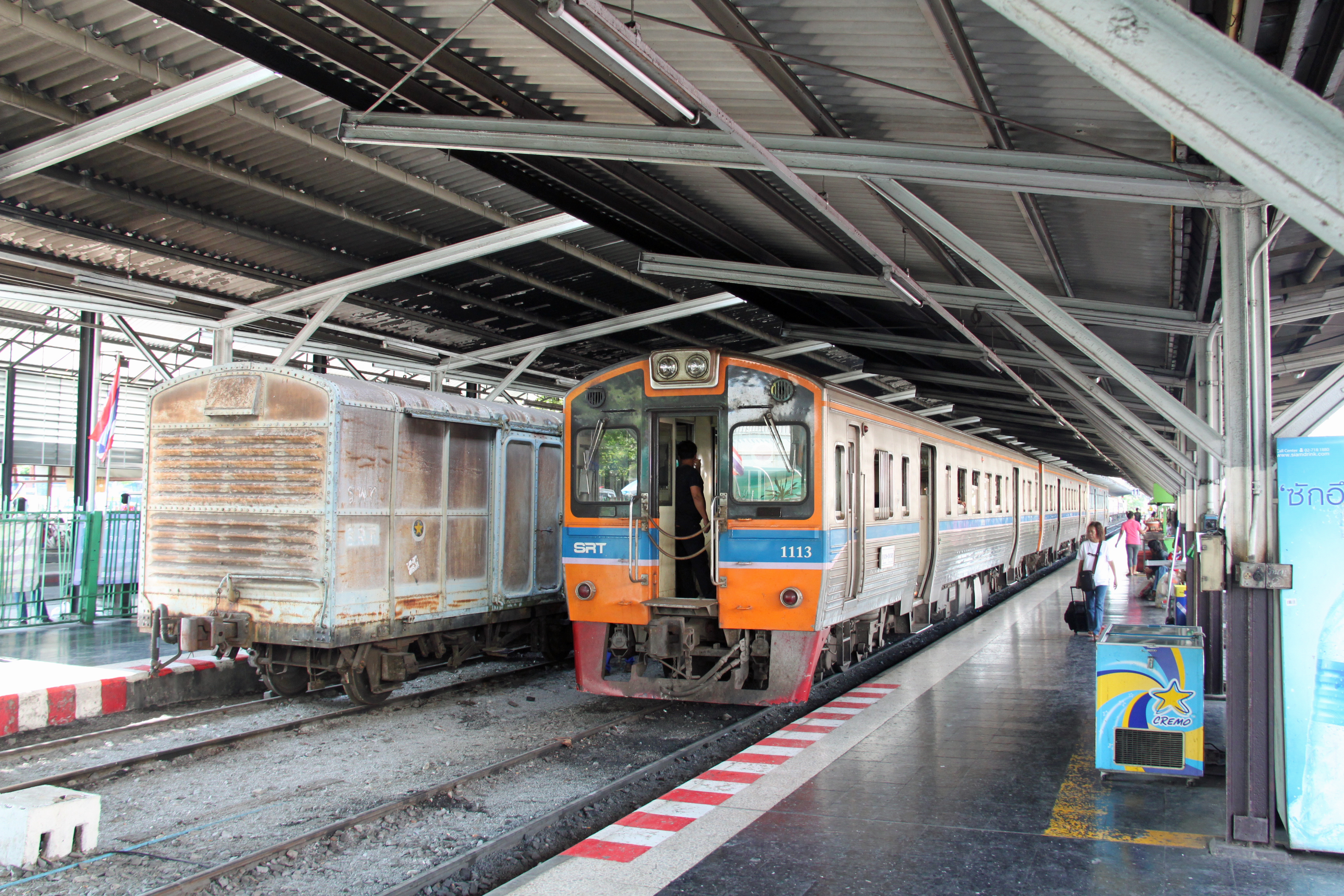
THN Unit 1113 at Bangkok (Hua Lamphong) station

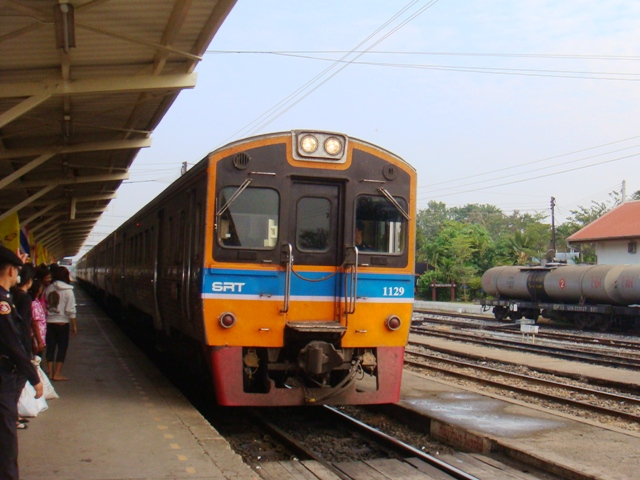
THN Unit 1129 at an unidentified station

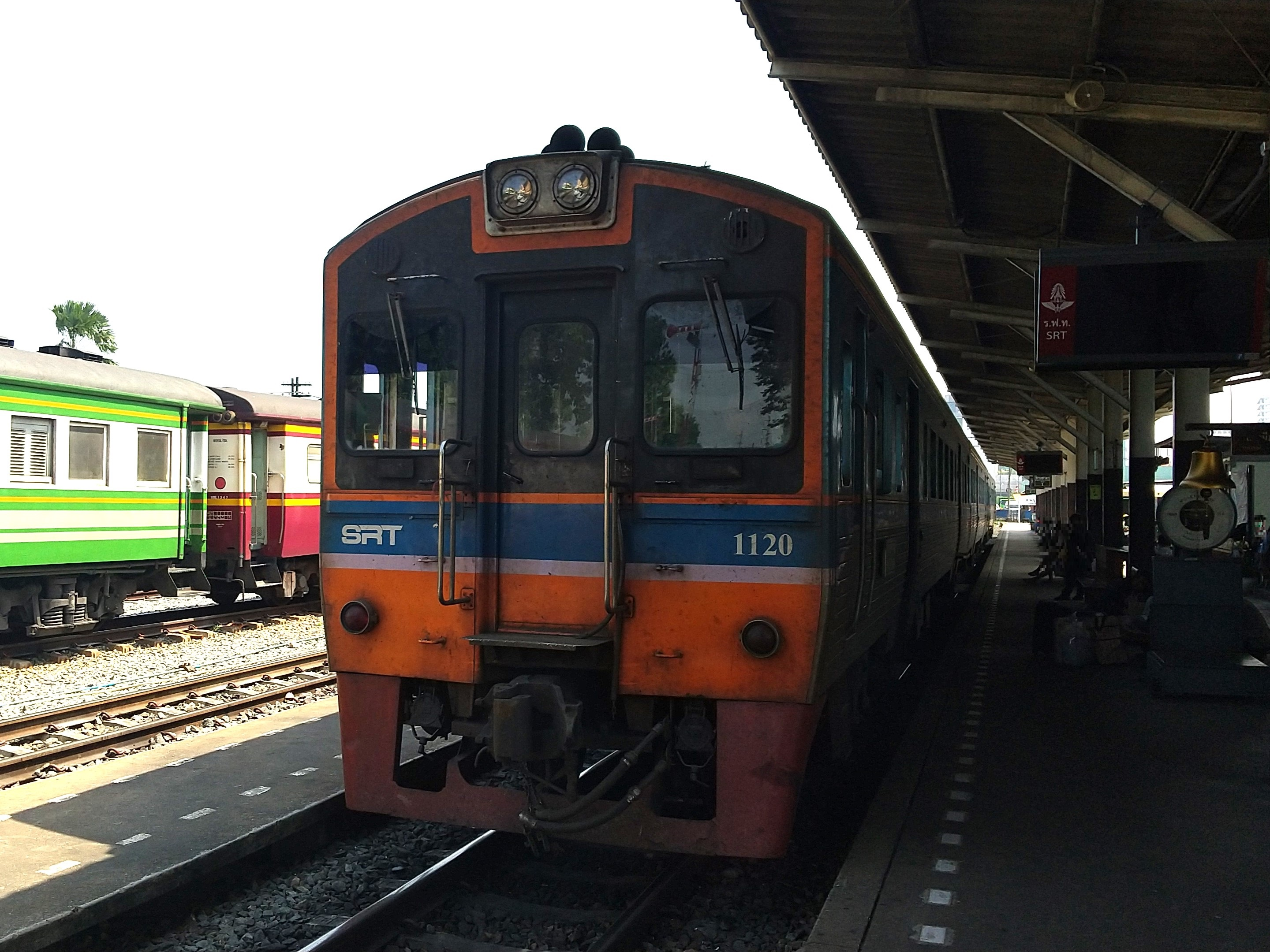
THN Unit 1120 at Thonburi station

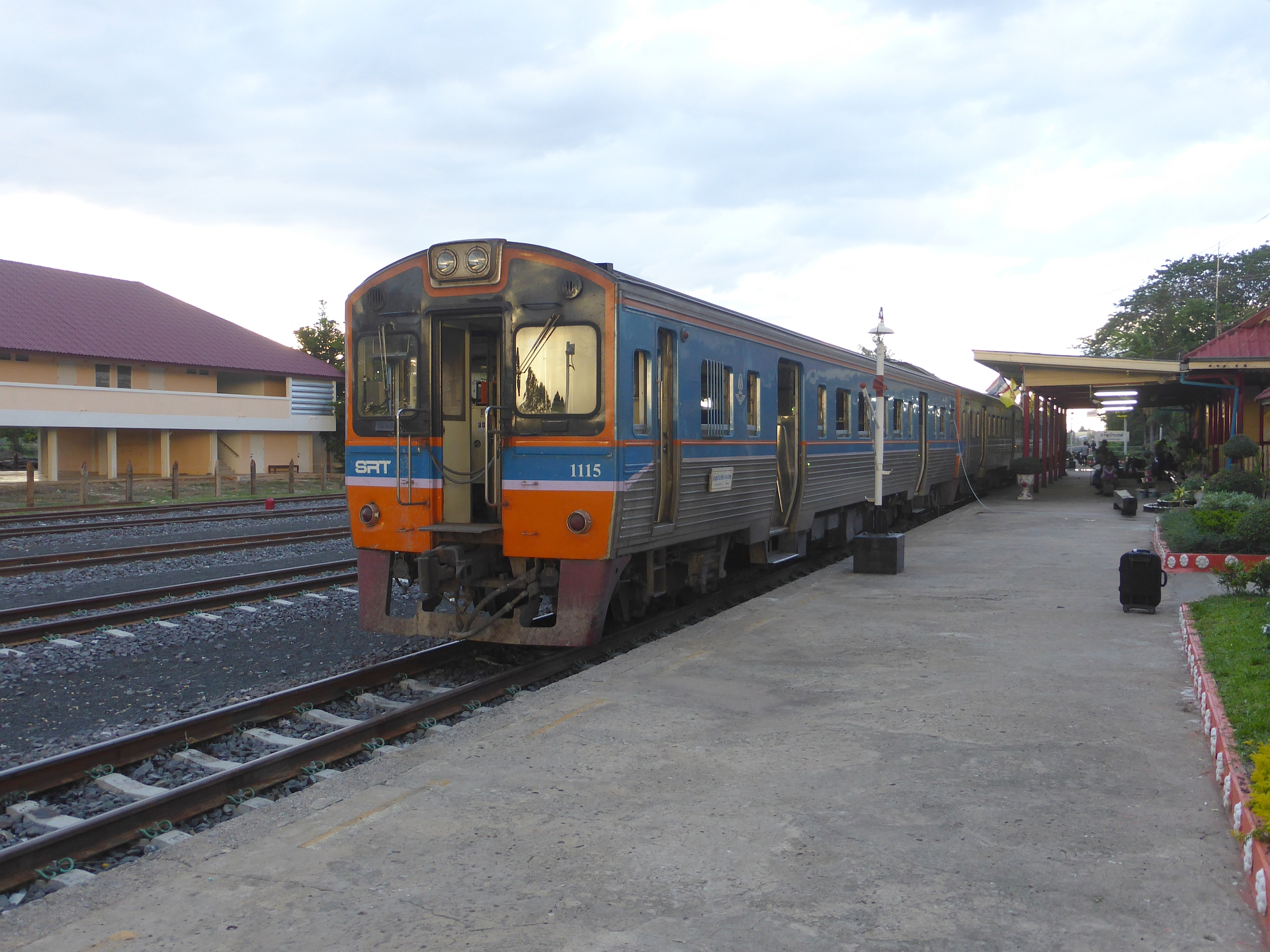
THN Unit 1115 at Aranyaphrathet station at the Thai-Cambodian Border

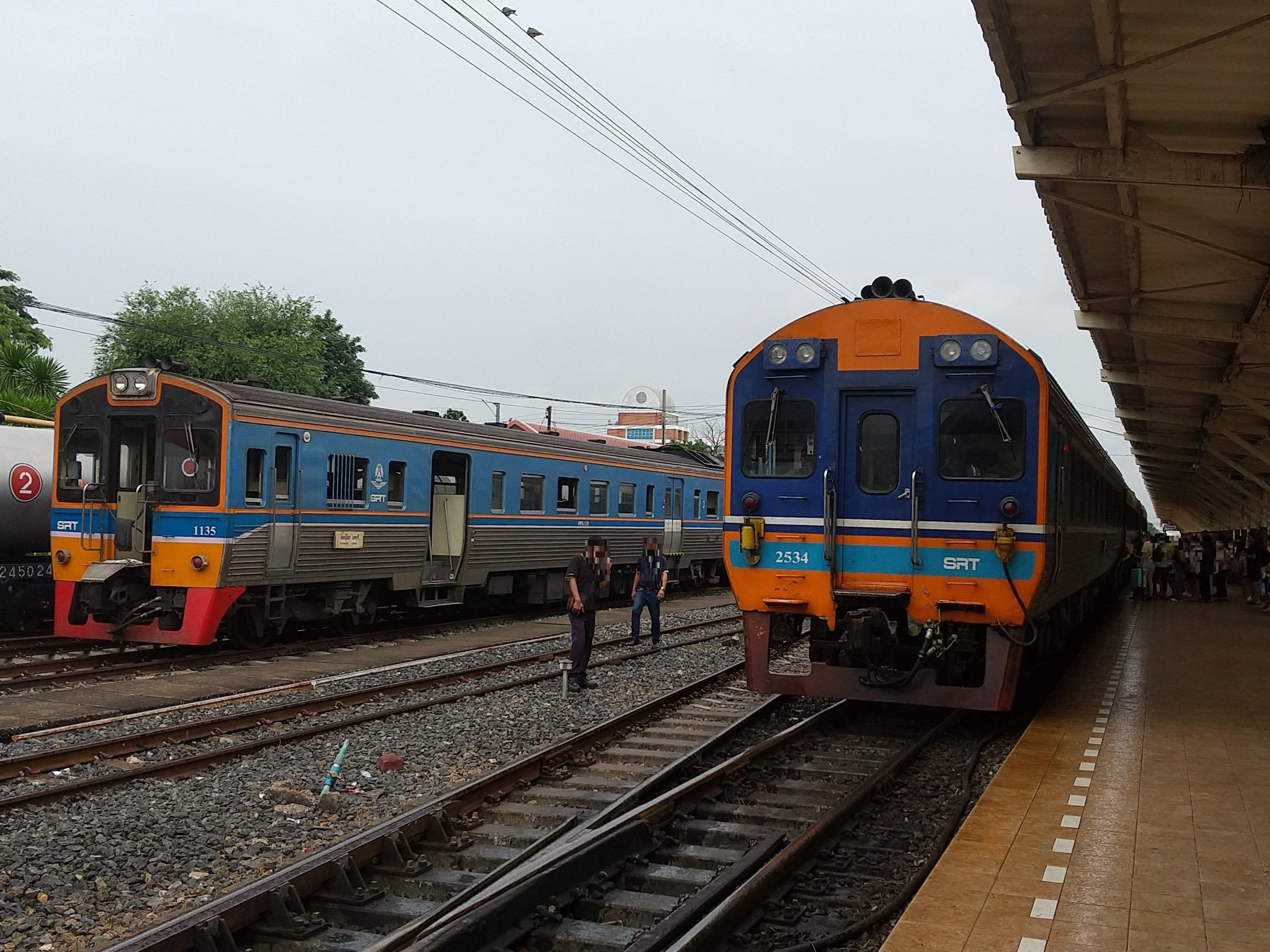
THN Unit 1135 at Phitslunok Train Station with APD .60 Unit 2534
