= State Railway of Thailand =

State-owned rail operator in Thailand

Coordinates: 13.7468°N 100.5170°E

State Railway of Thailand การรถไฟแห่งประเทศไทย
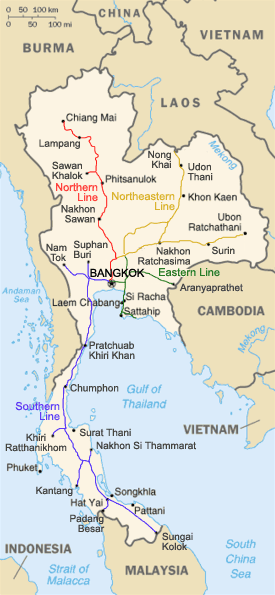
- SRT route map (2006)

Overview
- Headquarters: 1 Rong Mueang Road, Rong Mueang, Pathum Wan, Bangkok 10330
- Key people: Veeris Ammarapala (Governor)
- Reporting mark: SRT
- Locale: Thailand
- Dates of operation: 1951–present
- Predecessors: Royal State Railways of Siam (RSR)

Technical
- Track gauge: 1,000 mm (3 ft 3 3/8 in) meter gauge (Mainline) 1,435 mm (4 ft 8 1/2 in) standard gauge (Airport Rail Link)
- Previous gauge: 1,435 mm (4 ft 8 1/2 in) standard gauge (Mainline)
- Length: 4,044 km (2,513 mi)

Other
- Website: Official website

The State Railway of Thailand (SRT; Thai: การรถไฟแห่งประเทศไทย, abbrev. รฟท., RTGS: kan rot fai haeng prathet thai) is the state-owned rail operator under the jurisdiction of the Ministry of Transport in Thailand.

== History ==
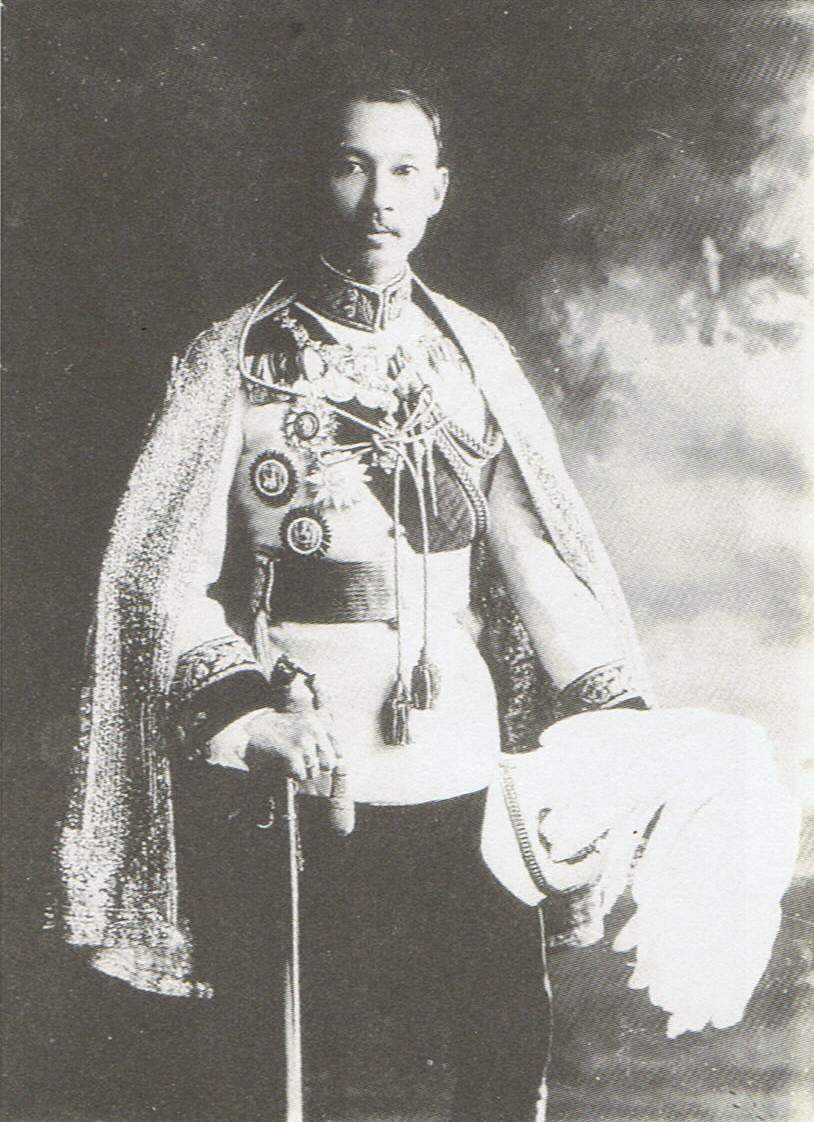
Prince Purachatra Jayakara, the first commissioner general of the Royal State Railways of Siam

The SRT was founded as the Royal State Railways of Siam (RSR) in 1890. King Chulalongkorn ordered the Department of Railways to be set up under the Department of Public Works and Town and Country Planning. Construction of the Bangkok-Ayutthaya railway (71 km or 44 mi), the first part of the Northern Line, was started in 1890 and inaugurated on 26 March 1897. The Thon Buri-Phetchaburi line (150 km or 93 mi), later the Southern Line, was opened on 19 June 1903. The first railway commander of the RSR was Prince Purachatra Jayakara, Prince of Kamphaengphet.

The Northern Line was originally built as 1,435 mm (4 ft 8 1/2 in) standard gauge , but in September 1919 it was decided to standardize on 1,000 mm (3 ft 3 3/8 in) meter gauge and the Northern Line was regauged over the next ten years. On 1 July 1951, RSR changed its name to the present State Railway of Thailand, which has the status of a state enterprise agency.

On 7 April 2020, the Thai cabinet named Nirut Maneephan as the new chief of the SRT, its 29th governor. As of 2020 SRT had 4,044 km (2,513 mi) of track, all of it meter gauge except the Airport Link. Nearly 91% was single-track railway (3,685 km (2,290 mi)) while 6%, mainly important sections around Bangkok, were double-track railway (251 km or 156 mi) and 3% were triple-track railway (107 km or 66 mi). The network serves 47 provinces and around 35 million passengers annually. The passenger count is expected to double by 2032, when the network grows to 6,463 km (4,016 mi) to serve 61 provinces.

== SRT issues ==
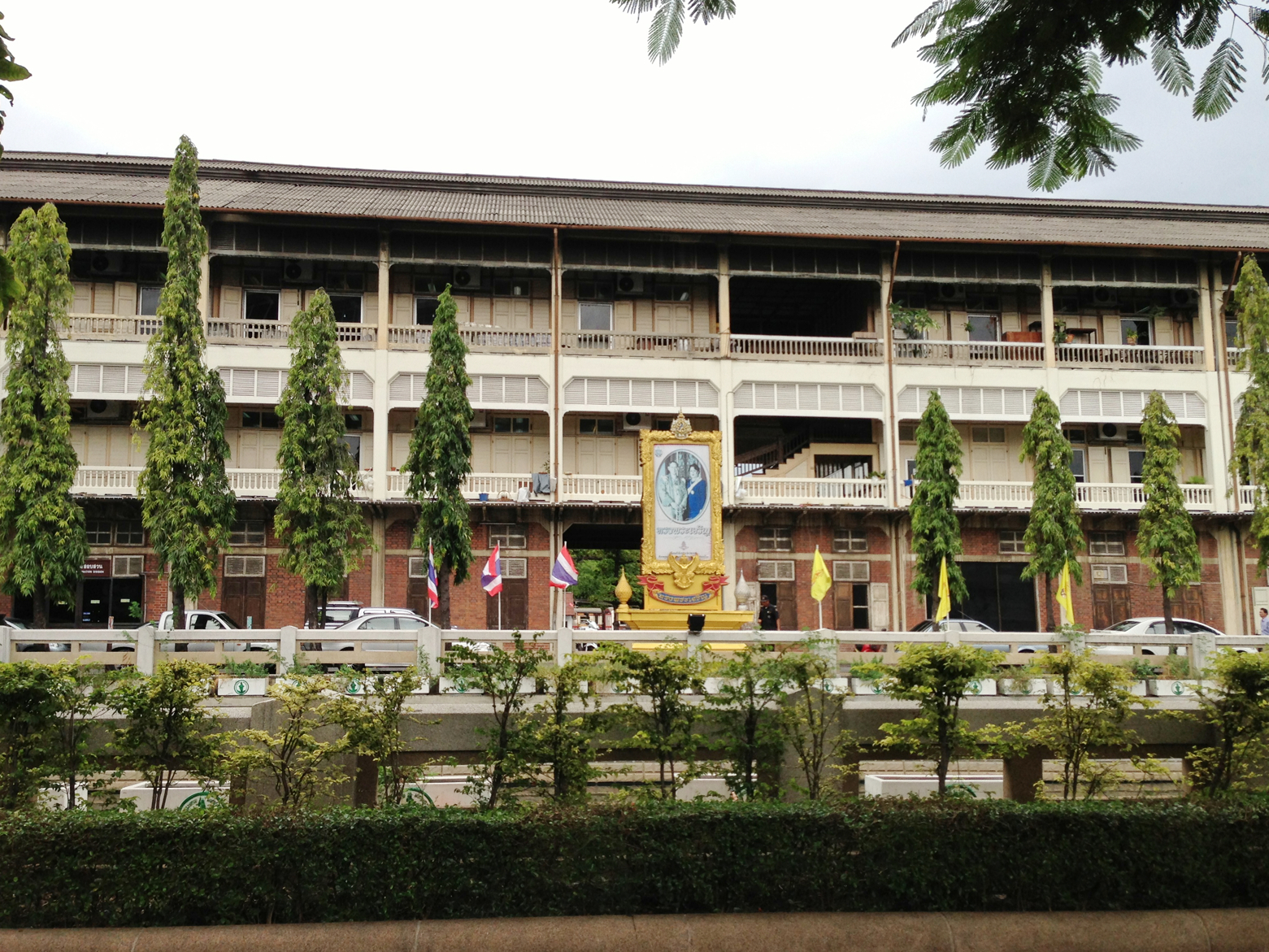
Buildings of the State Railway of Thailand headquarters, near Bangkok (Hua Lamphong) railway station.

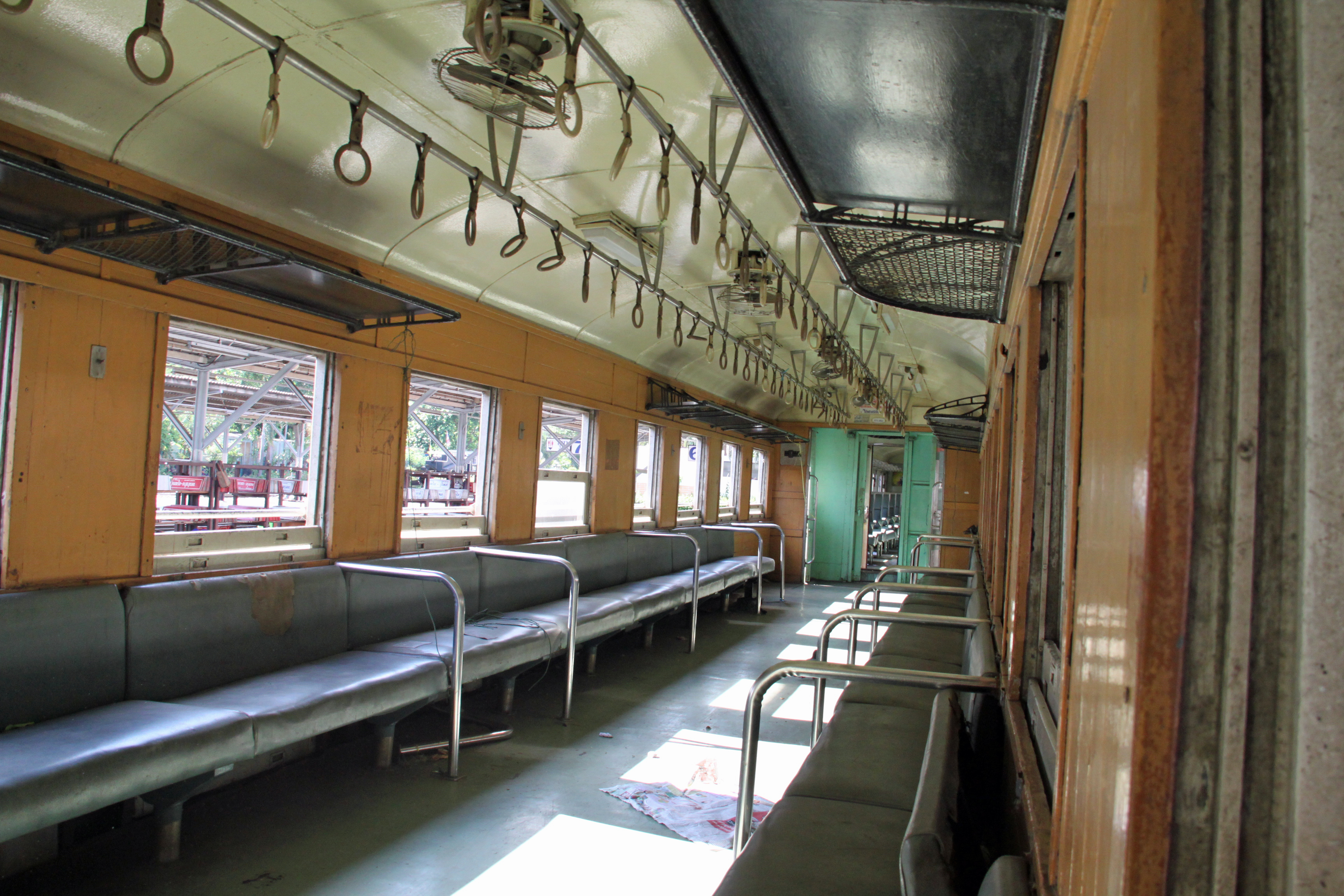
Third-class carriage with 'hall' seating arrangement

=== Financial performance ===
The SRT has suffered a loss every year since it was turned into a state-owned enterprise under the Transport Ministry in 1951. As the worst financially performing state enterprise, it reported a preliminary loss of 7.58 billion baht in 2010. In the fiscal year ending 30 September 2016, the military government budgeted 7,600 million baht for SRT infrastructure investments to be used for track duplication, an extension of Bangkok's elevated railway, and construction of bridges, fences, and track improvements, however, the SRT had managed to disburse only 53 percent of its allotted investment budget of 60 billion baht, compared with an average disbursement rate of 80 percent by Thailand's other 55 state-owned enterprises (SOEs). Disbursement rate is seen as an indicator of efficient management. SRT's budget from government for FY2020 was 13,574.9 million baht, increased from 9,087 million baht in FY2019.

"If you look at the SRT they are a bit like a patient in [intensive care] and everyone is saying to him 'you are the future' and trying to kick him out of bed when he is still moaning and groaning," said Ruth Banomyong, a logistics and transport expert at Thammasat University.

The SRT annual operating losses are estimated at a minimum of 10 billion baht. In 2018 and 2019, the SRT lost 12 and 17 billion baht respectively. As of 2021 the SRT has debts amounting to nearly 190 billion baht. The SRT consistently operates at a loss despite being endowed with large amounts of property—the SRT is one of Thailand's largest land holders, owning an estimated 39,840 hectares— and receiving large government subsidies. SRT's latest property development scheme is the Chao Phraya Gateway project. It capitalises on SRT's 277 rai, 1.16 kilometre stretch of land on the river in the Khlong Toei District. The SRT hopes the project will help clear its 100 billion baht debt. The plan is projected to break even within eight years and deliver profits of 140 billion baht. As of April 2019, SRT's plans are being submitted to the Transport Ministry for approval.

SRT's failings are reflected in passenger numbers, which, according to the Economist Intelligence Unit have dropped from 88 million in 1994 to 44 million in 2014, and 26 million in 2020. The SRT has long been popularly perceived by the public as inefficient and resistant to change. Trains are usually late, and most of its equipment is old and poorly maintained. Although SRT's operational costs amount to two baht per kilometre traveled, SRT fares defray only a fraction of that cost. SRT has not been permitted to hike fares since 1985 which is significantly below market rate.

Under the auspices of the Transport Ministry, the SRT has submitted a rehabilitation plan that will be presented to the State Enterprise Policy Commission on 30 July 2018. The commission, chaired by Prime Minister Prayut Chan-o-cha is expected to approve the plan. The plan calls for SRT to become the largest railway state enterprise in ASEAN. By 2027, anticipating income growth from asset management and cost management, SRT foresees profits of over 20 billion baht.

=== Hopewell litigation ===
Hopewell Holdings of Hong Kong was the lead contractor for SRT's ill-fated Bangkok Elevated Road and Train System. The project commenced in 1990 and was terminated by the Thai government in 1998, only 13% complete. Hopewell and the SRT each blamed the other for the failure of the 80 billion baht project. Both parties sued, and the case has been in litigation since its cancellation. On 23 April 2019, Thailand's Supreme Administrative Court upheld an arbitration committee's ruling in favour of Hopewell. The court ordered SRT to pay Hopewell compensation of 11.88 billion baht, plus 7.5% interest per year. The interest, totaling 13 billion baht, brings SRT's total liability to nearly 25 billion baht, payable within 180 days.

=== Lack of freight revenue ===
Rail freight, which is cheaper—only roughly half the cost of road transport—safer, and more environmentally-friendly than road transport, accounted for only 1.4 percent of freight tonnage carried in 2015. SRT aims to boost its share of cargo transport to six percent with its rail duplication by 2022. Expansion of SRT's freight service, which could earn more money than the heavily subsidized passenger service, has been neglected for decades in favour of Thailand's roads.

=== Workforce ===
The SRT's poor financial performance and resistance to reform, coupled with the 1997 Asian financial crisis, resulted in stringent restraints being placed on SRT staffing. In July 1998, the Thai cabinet issued an order that the SRT could only hire five new employees for every 100 retirees. As of 2018, the order remains in effect. SRT officials estimated in 2017 that the enterprise needed to boost staff by 20 percent to 12,000. In 2018 SRT claims that it needs 18,015 employees to operate efficiently, but only has 10,035 on staff. The train maintenance workforce has dwindled to 500 from 3,000 over the past 30 years.

To make up the shortfall, the SRT hires around 4,000 "yearly staffs", usually on daily wages of 300 baht. It has also caused the SRT to pay massive amounts of overtime pay to current employees. For example, one station master in Pattani was paid 61,210 baht in monthly salary, but also an additional 102,271 baht in overtime pay. As of 2020, the staff employment quota was 4,056 but SRT hired 3,721 staffs.

As of July 2019, SRT employed 10,292 employees and 3,928 yearly staffs, totaling 14,220 while the SRT Board approved the addition of 1,330 new workers to bring the workforce to 15,550, still fewer than needed to address staff shortages. As of 2020, SRT employed 9,204 employees and 3,721 yearly staffs totaling 12,925 while employment quotas respectively was 18,015 and 4,056 totaling 22,071.

=== Management issues ===
To address a long list of complaints accusing SRT of a lack of transparency in bids for projects and procurement deals, Prime Minister Prayut Chan-o-cha fired the governor and board of the State Railway of Thailand in February 2017, using his special powers under Section 44 of the interim constitution.

== Ticketing ==
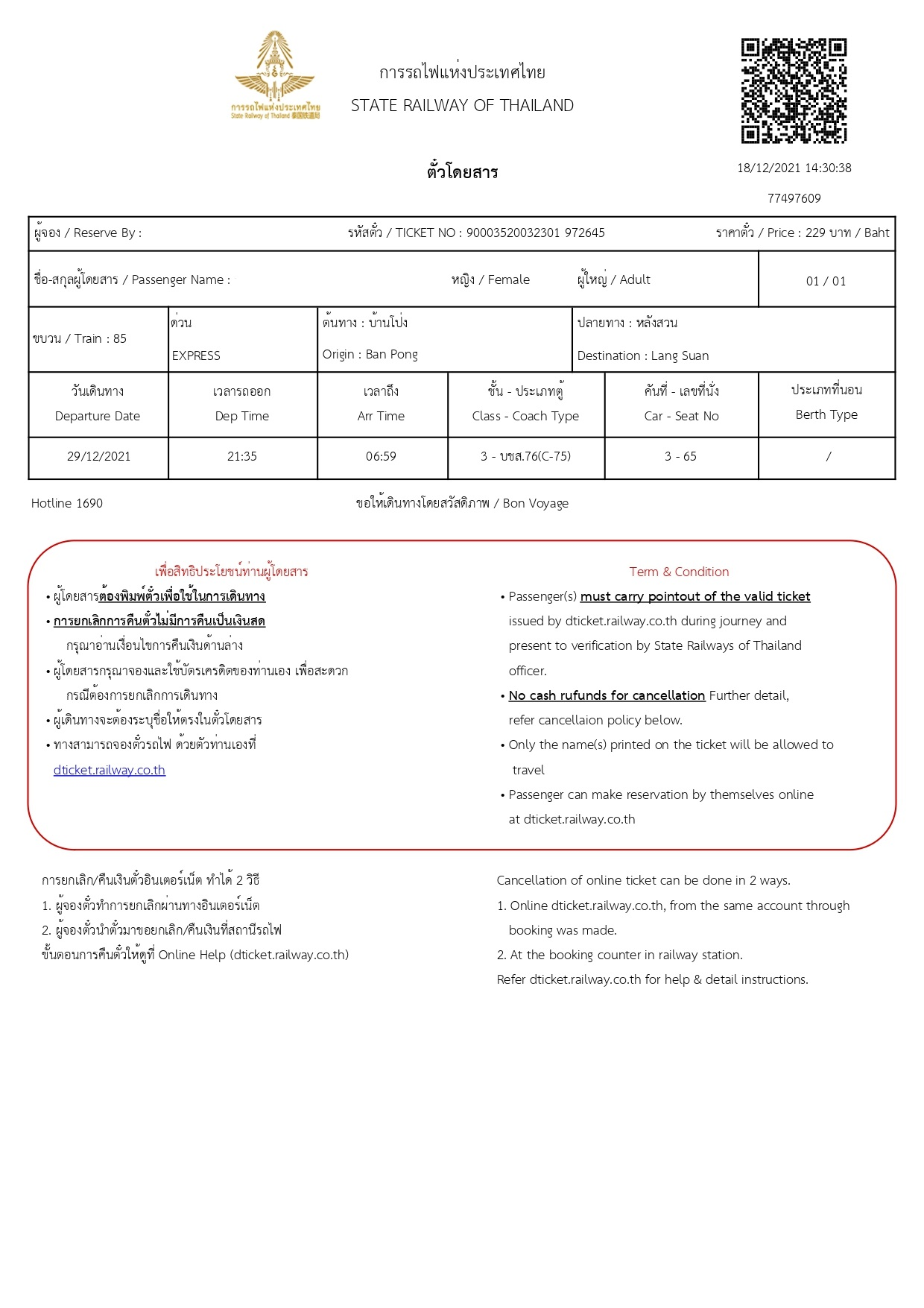
An online purchased ticket

Since 1 February 2017, Tickets can be purchased online, in person, as well was on the phone by dialling 1690.

Since 1 February 2024, all long distance special express and express train tickets open up 90 days in advance. Most other tickets can only be bought up to 30 days in advance. For local ordinary and commuter trains, they only can be bought on the day of travel at the station.

Since May 2024, a waiting list function has been added, allowing registered users to wait for available tickets if they have been sold out.

== Network ==
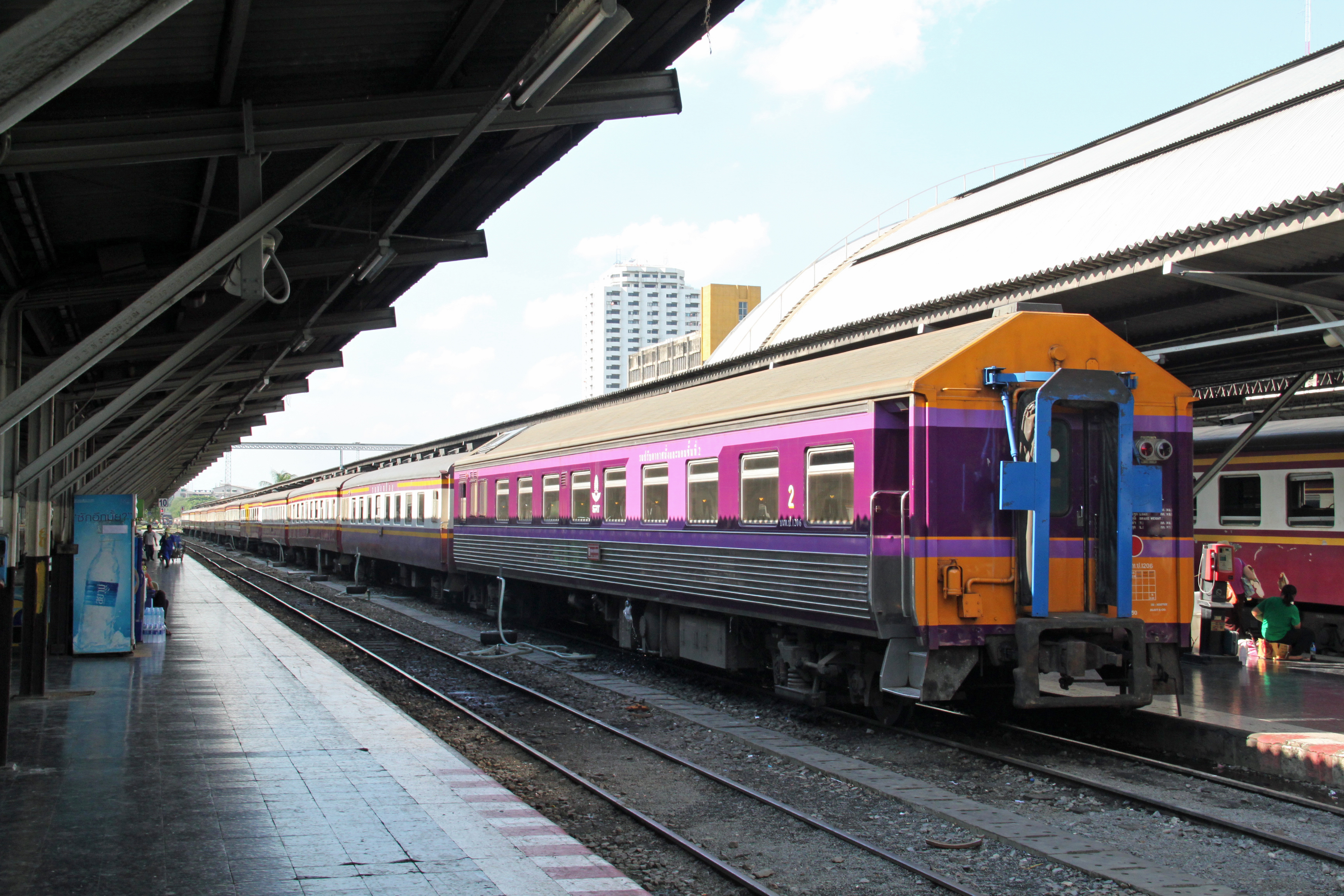
Second-class carriage of the State Railway of Thailand at Bangkok railway station

The SRT operates all of Thailand's national rail lines. As of 2023, Krung Thep Aphiwat Central Terminal is the main terminus of all long-distance services from Bangkok on the Northern, Northeastern and Southern lines, while Bangkok (Hua Lamphong) railway station is the terminus of all Eastern line services and commuter services from Bangkok on the Northern, Northeastern and Southern lines. Phahonyothin and Ladkrabang Inland Container Depot (ICD) are the main freight terminals.

=== Northern Line ===
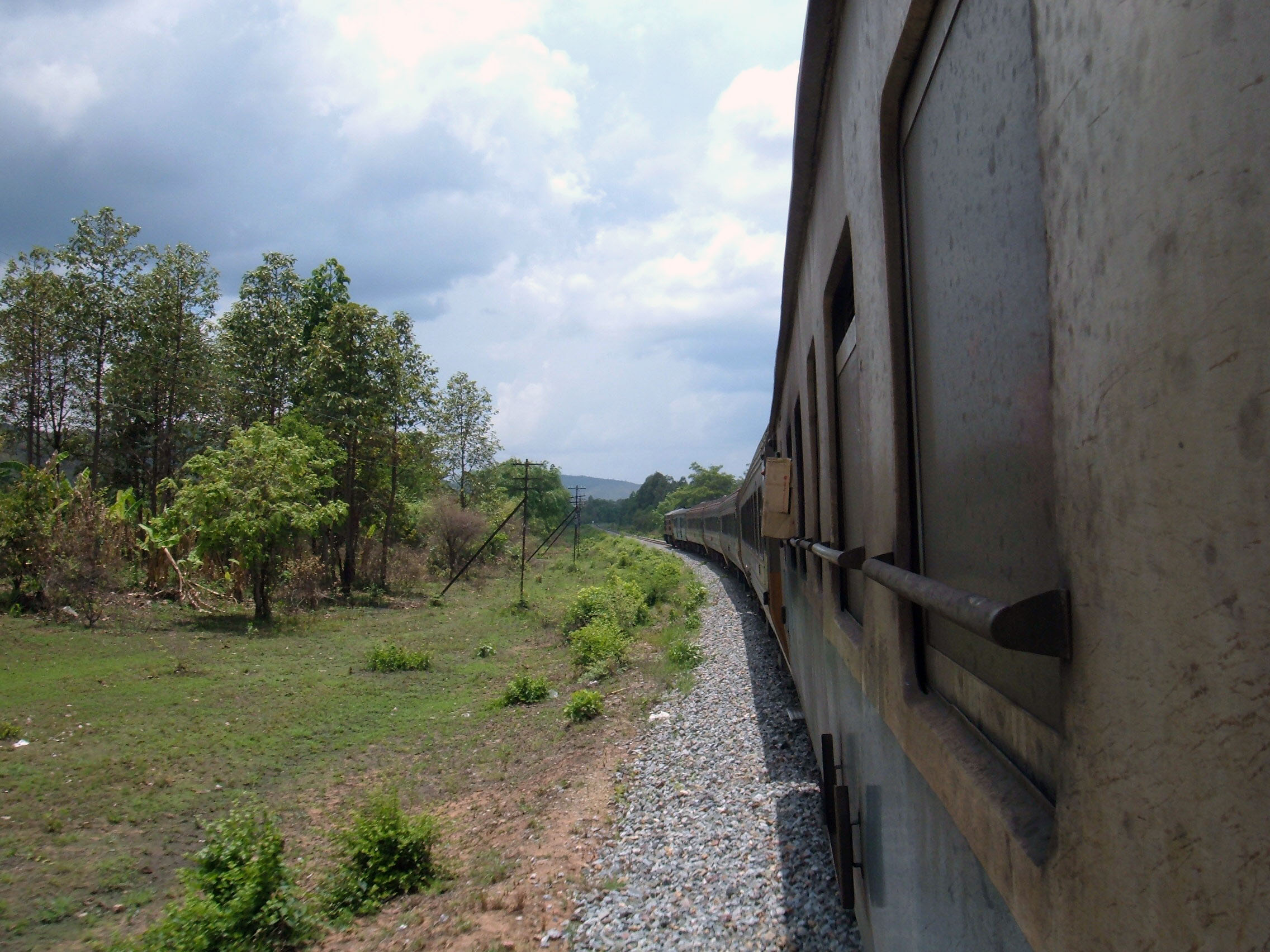
A train on the Northern Line of the State Railway of Thailand en route from Bangkok to Chiang Mai

The Northern Line runs alongside the Northeastern Line until the Ban Phachi Junction. There, it splits from the Northeastern Line and proceeds through Lopburi, Nakhon Sawan, Phichit, Phitsanulok, Denchai, Lampang, Lamphun, before finally reaching Chiang Mai, 751 km (467 mi) from Bangkok. There is also a branch off the main line from Ban Dara Junction to Sawankhalok in Sukhothai Province.

- Krung Thep Aphiwat Central Terminal - Main station and freight terminal with main diesel locomotive depot and refueling facility.
- Ayutthaya Station - Ayutthaya main station. High passenger revenue, second only to Bangkok Station. It is possible to change here to the Northeastern Line.
- Ban Phachi Junction - A major junction, where the Northern and Northeastern lines separate.
- Lopburi Station - The end of northern Bangkok suburban service; a military town with much history.
- Nakhon Sawan Station - Nakhon Sawan Main Station, Nong Pling Station until 1956.
- Phichit Station - Phichit Main Station
- Phitsanulok Station - Phitsanulok Main station, town with the famous Phra Phuttha Chinnarat
- Ban Dara Junction - Junction for Sawankhalok Line
- Sawankhalok Station - Terminus of Sawankhalok Branch. Station for Sukhothai Province and travel to Sukhothai and Si Satchanalai Historical Parks.
- Uttaradit Station - Main station, Uttaradit Province.
- Sila At Station - Depot on the Northern Line. Refueling station and up trains will be cut at this station
- Den Chai Station - The dropping point for Phrae with a proposal for a junction for Den Chai – Chiang Rai route
- Nakhon Lampang Station - Depot on the Northern Line. Train will be cut further if going north to Chiang Mai.
- Khun Tan Station - Station in the mountains, base point and entrance for Doi Khuntan National Park.
- Lamphun Station - Main station for Lamphun Province
- Chiang Mai Station - Northern terminus.

=== Northeastern Line ===
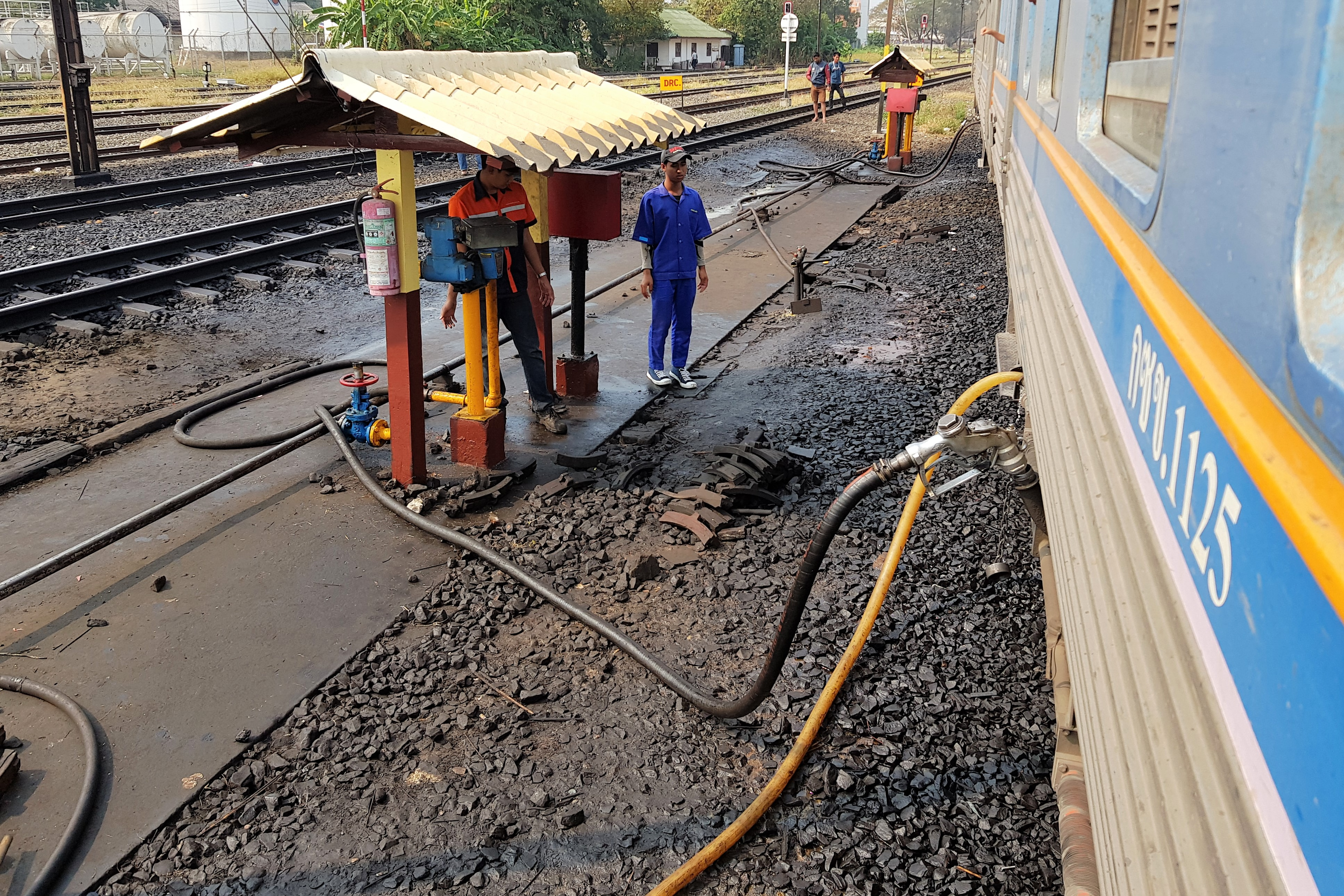
Fueling express train no. 72 at Nakhon Ratchasima Station

The Northeastern Line begins on the same route as the Northern Line, splitting at Ban Phachi Junction towards Nakhon Ratchasima. Then at Thanon Chira Junction, the line splits with one route passing Khon Kaen and Udon Thani before terminating at Nong Khai 624 kilometers (388 mi) from Bangkok. The other route passes through Buriram, Surin, Sisaket to reach Ubon Ratchathani, 575 km (357 mi) from Bangkok.

There is also another branch route originating from Kaeng Khoi Junction in Saraburi Province passing through Chai Badan District in Lopburi Province and Chatturat District in Chaiyaphum Province, before joining the main line heading towards Nong Khai at Bua Yai Junction in Nakhon Ratchasima Province.

- Saraburi Station - Main Saraburi station, named Pak Priaw station until 1934.
- Kaeng Khoi Junction - The Bua Yai Line and Khlong Sip Kao line diverge from the main line here. Main Depot with refuelling facility. The point for dividing freight trains into two trains to pass difficult section of Dong Phraya Yen (Kaeng Khoi - Pak Chong) or combining divided freight trains into one train
- Pak Chong Station - The gateway to Nakhon Ratchasima and the point for dividing freight trains into two to pass difficult section of Dong Phraya Yen (Kaeng Khoi - Pak Chong) or combining divided freight trains into one train
- Nakhon Ratchasima Station - Main depot of the Northeastern Line with refuelling facility and a branch line to 2nd Army Support Command. Main Nakhon Ratchasima station.
- Thanon Chira Junction - Junction for Nong Khai line close to Fort Suranaree (2nd Army Region HQ)
- Buriram Station - Buriram provincial station with a branch line to a quarry at Khao Kradong
- Surin Station - Main Surin station
- Sisaket Station - Main Sisaket station.
- Ubon Ratchathani Station in town of Warin Chamrap - Terminus of South Isaan Line (also known as Ubon Line) with depot and refuelling facility. Named Varindr station until 1942–1943. Main Ubon Ratchathani Station.
- Lam Narai Station- Station on the Lam Narai/Bua Yai Branch, for Chai Badan Municipality.
- Chatturat Station- Station on the Lam Narai/Bua Yai Branch, alight for Chaiyaphum.
- Bua Yai Junction - junction with refuelling facility
- Khon Kaen Station - Khon Kaen main station
- Udon Thani Station - Udon Thani main station with refuelling facility.
- Nong Khai Station in town of Nong Khai - Terminus of North Isaan Line (also known as Nong Khai Line), provides a connection to Khamsavath Station in Vientiane Prefecture, Laos. Main Nong Khai station.

=== Southern Line ===
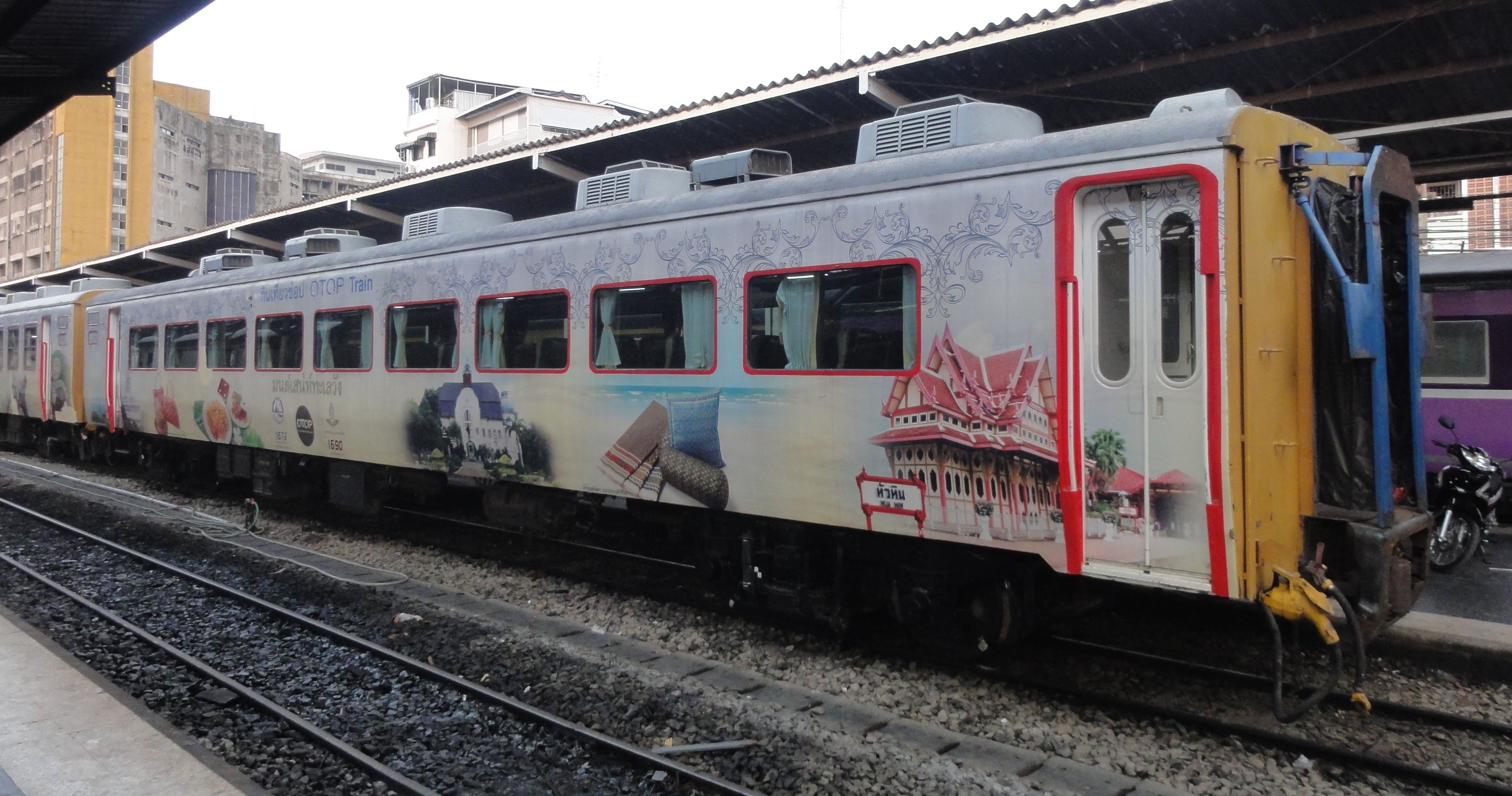
A OTOP tourist train for operation on the Southern Line of the State Railway of Thailand

The Southern Line begins in Bangkok and heads west towards Nakhon Pathom before splitting into three different routes. One route heads west to Kanchanaburi Province (210 km (130 mi)) while another heads north towards Suphan Buri (157 km (98 mi)). The Southern Line itself continues southbound through Ratchaburi, Phetchaburi, Hua Hin, Prachuap Khiri Khan Province, Chumphon, to Surat Thani 678 kilometers (421 mi) away. From Surat Thani, there is a westerly branch towards Khiri Rat Nikhom while the main line continues south to Thung Song Junction in Nakhon Si Thammarat Province where another branch reaches Kantang in Trang Province. Not far away, another branch separates off the main line at Khao Chum Thong Junction. The main line from Nakhon Sri Thammarat continues through Phatthalung before reaching Hat Yai Junction in Songkhla Province. From here, a line branches off to connect with the Malaysian railway at Padang Besar and the main line continues to Su-ngai Kolok passing through Yala Province.

- Krung Thep Aphiwat Central Terminal - Main station and freight terminal with main diesel locomotive depot and refueling facility.
- Bang Bamru Station- Suburban Station, all trains must stop here. First station after crossing the Rama 6 Bridge from Bang Sue.
- Taling Chan Junction- Junction for Southern Main Line (Bang Sue-Taling Chan Link) and Thonburi Branch.
- Thon Buri Station - Former terminus of Southern Line, however some southern trains remain to start the journey here.
- Salaya Station- Suburban Station, for Phutthamonthon District and Mahidol University (Salaya Campus)
- Nakhon Pathom Station - Main southern suburban station. Main Nakhon Pathom station.
- Nong Pladuk Junction - Junction for Namtok Branch Line and Suphan Buri Branch Line.
- Ban Pong Station - Interchange to Kanchanaburi for those who did not travel along Nam Tok branch line
- Ratchaburi Station - Terminal for southern suburban service, also Ratchaburi main station.
- Phetchaburi Station - Phetchaburi main station.
- Hua Hin Station - Provincial Station for Hua Hin in Prachuap Khiri Khan with crew changing station.
- Wang Phong Station- One of the stations in Pran Buri. Also for the nearby Thanarat Military Camp. More trains stop here for Pran Buri than Pran Buri Station itself.
- Pran Buri Station- Smaller station for Pran Buri, with a well-established Saturday Night Market opposite the station.
- Prachuap Khiri Khan Station - Prachuap Khiri Khan main station.
- Bang Saphan Yai Station - Regional town station. All trains going further south must stop here.
- Chumphon Station - Main Chumphon station, locomotive depot with refuelling facility
- Lang Suan Station- Provincial Station in Chumphon. Furthest extent of southern services from Thonburi.
- Ban Thung Pho Junction - Southern container yard, for Khiri Rat Nikhom Branch.
- Khiri Rat Nikhom Station - Terminus for the Khiri Rat Nikhom Branch and the railway to Phang Nga and Tanun (Phuket).
- Surat Thani Station - Crew changing station and Surat Thani main station.
- Thung Song Junction - Locomotive depot, refuelling facility and junction for Kantang Branch.
- Trang Station - Trang main station.
- Kantang Station - Terminus of Kantang Branch.
- Khao Chum Thong Junction - Junction for Nakhon Si Thammarat Branch.
- Nakhon Si Thammarat Station - Terminus of Nakhon Si Thammarat Branch. Nakhon Si Thammarat main station.
- Phatthalung Station - Phatthalung main station, crew changing station
- Hat Yai Junction - Main junction for Malaysia and Singapore and Main Line of Southern Line, Locomotive Depot and refueling facility. Main Songkhla Station.
- Padang Besar Station - International KTM station in Malaysia. Trains continue to Butterworth (Penang) and further.
- Pattani Station - formerly Khok Pho station, Pattani main station.
- Yala Station - Main Yala station, crew changing station
- Tanyong Mat Station - for Ra Ngae district and Narathiwat.
- Su-ngai Kolok Station - Terminus of Southern Line. Formerly an international station until the termination of cross-border services.

==== Namtok Branch ====
- Thon Buri Station - Terminus of Western Line
- Taling Chan Junction - Junction for Bangsue - Taling Chan link (also known as Rama 6 Line), the connection between south and north SRT systems opened with the building of the only rail bridge across the Chao Phraya River in 1925.
- Salaya Station - Bangkok suburban station close to Mahidol University (Salaya Campus)
- Nakhon Pathom Station - Nakhon Pathom main station.
- Nong Pladuk Junction - Junction for Suphan Buri and Kanchanaburi.
- Suphanburi Station - A 2-car DMU operates to Bangkok in the early morning and from Bangkok in the evening.
- Kanchanaburi Station - Main Kanchanaburi station
- Nam Tok Station - Terminus of Western Line.

=== Eastern Line ===
The Eastern Line begins at Bangkok before heading through Chachoengsao, Prachinburi to terminate at Aranyaprathet in Sa Kaew Province, 255 kilometers from Bangkok. There is a reopened rail link to Cambodia from Aranyaprathet. A branch line also connects Khlong Sip Kao Junction to the Northeastern Line at Kaeng Khoi Junction. At Chachoengsao Junction, there is another branch to Sattahip. Along the route to Sattahip, at Si Racha Junction, there is yet another branch towards Laem Chabang Deep Sea Port and further at Khao Chi Chan Junction for Map Ta Phut Port, in Rayong.

As of January 2023, all services terminate at Bangkok (Hua Lamphong) station. No services run to Krung Thep Aphiwat Central Terminal.

- Makkasan Station - the main depot of SRT (Makkasan Works)
- Hua Mak Station - Bangkok suburban station
- Hua Takhe Station - Junction for ICD.
- Chachoengsao Junction - Junction for Laem Chabang (double-track railway opened January 2012) and Aranyaprathet Line. Main Chachoengsao station.
- Khlong Sip Kao Junction- Junction for the Aranyaprathet Line and the Cargo Link to Kaeng Khoi Junction.
- Prachin Buri Station- Main Prachin Buri Province Rail Station.
- Kabin Buri Station- Half of long-distance Aranyaprathet Line services terminate here. In Prachin Buri Province.
- Sa Kaeo Station - Main Sa Kaeo station
- Ban Klong Luk Border Station - Terminus of Aranyaprathet Main Line.
- Chonburi Station- Main Chonburi station
- Si Racha Junction - Junction for Laem Chabang Deep Sea Port.
- Pattaya Station - Railway station for Pattaya City.
- Khao Chi Chan Junction- Junction for Sattahip Commercial Port and Map Taphut Freight Line
- Ban Phlu Ta Luang Station - One of railway stations from Sattahip
- U Taphao Station - One of railway stations from Sattahip
- Chuk Samet Station - Terminus for current, operational, ordinary train from Bangkok.
- Map Ta Phut Station - Terminus of East Coast Line - freight trains only.

=== Maeklong Line ===
The Maeklong Railway, also operated by the SRT, is independent of the national rail network and is split into two sections. The line begins at Wongwian Yai in Bangkok before terminating at the Mahachai station in Samut Sakhon, where a ferry is used by passengers to cross the Tha Chin River. The line starts again across the river at Ban Laem and continues until the Mae Klong station of Samut Songkhram.

== Services ==
SRT operates different types of rail services, each with different service patterns as outlined below:

- Special Express - fastest services, calling at the least number of intermediate stations between the origin and destination. Generally only call at main provincial stations.
- Express - slightly slower services, calling at a larger number of intermediate stations than Special Express. Generally call at all main provincial stations and at some major towns.
- Rapid - slower services calling at all main provincial stations and major towns and some smaller towns.
- Ordinary - services calling at all stations and some railway halts, originating or terminating in Bangkok.
- Commuter (Suburban in Timetable Matrix) - services calling at all stations and all railway halts, originating or terminating in Bangkok.
- Local - services calling at all stations and all railway halts, originating or terminating outside Bangkok.
- Excursion - special services running on weekends such as the weekend Nam Tok Sai Yok Noi and Suan Son Pradiphat services, or services running on specific days or time periods such as the Pa Sak Jolasid Dam excursion train running only during the winter and the steam train services on designated days.

=== Long-distance services ===
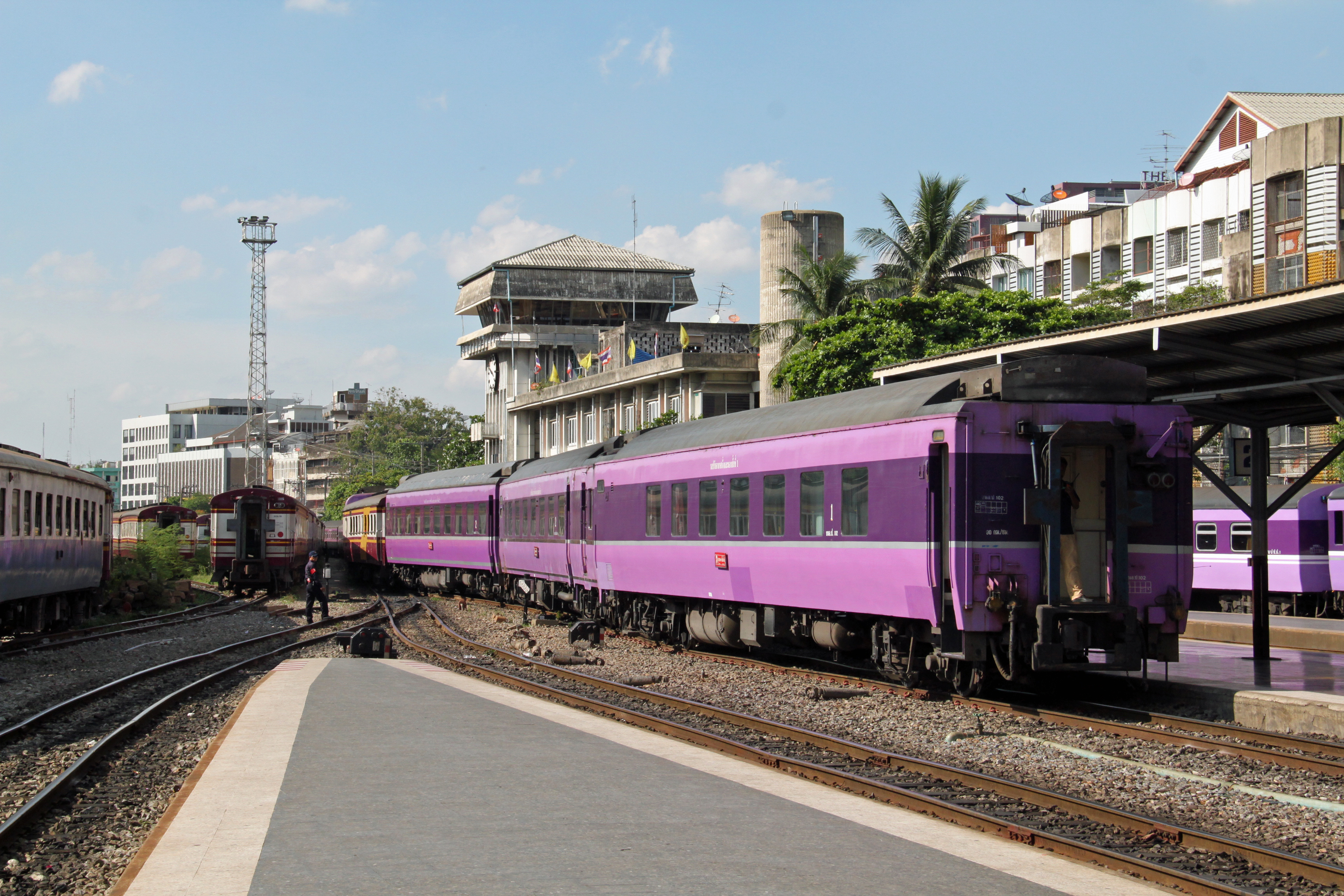
First-class JNR sleeping carriage at Bangkok railway station

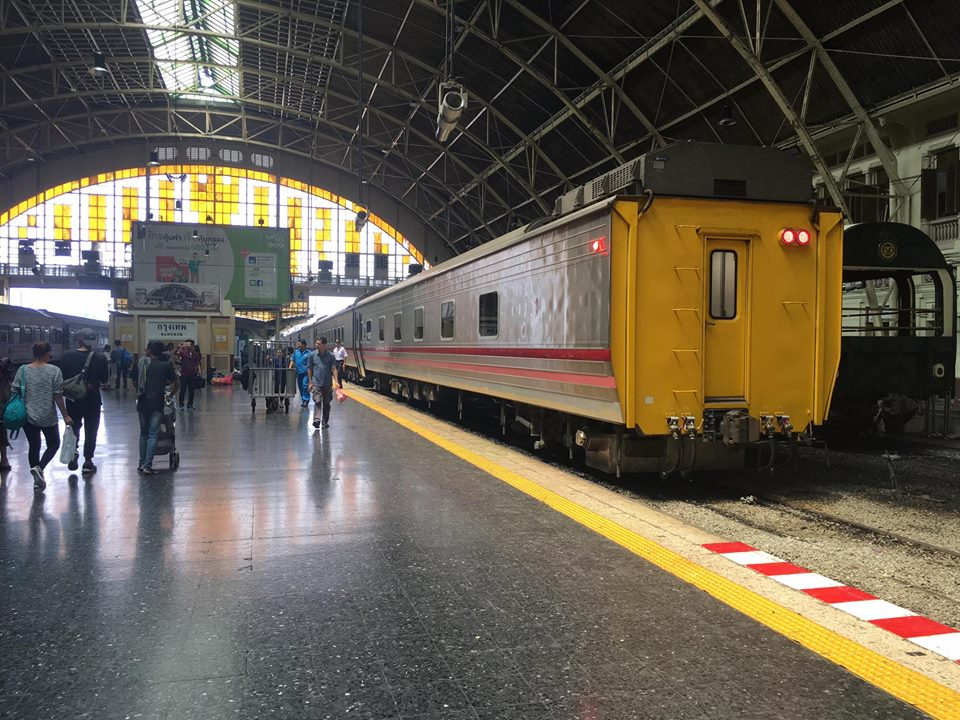
First-class CNR sleeping carriage of State Railway of Thailand at Bangkok railway station

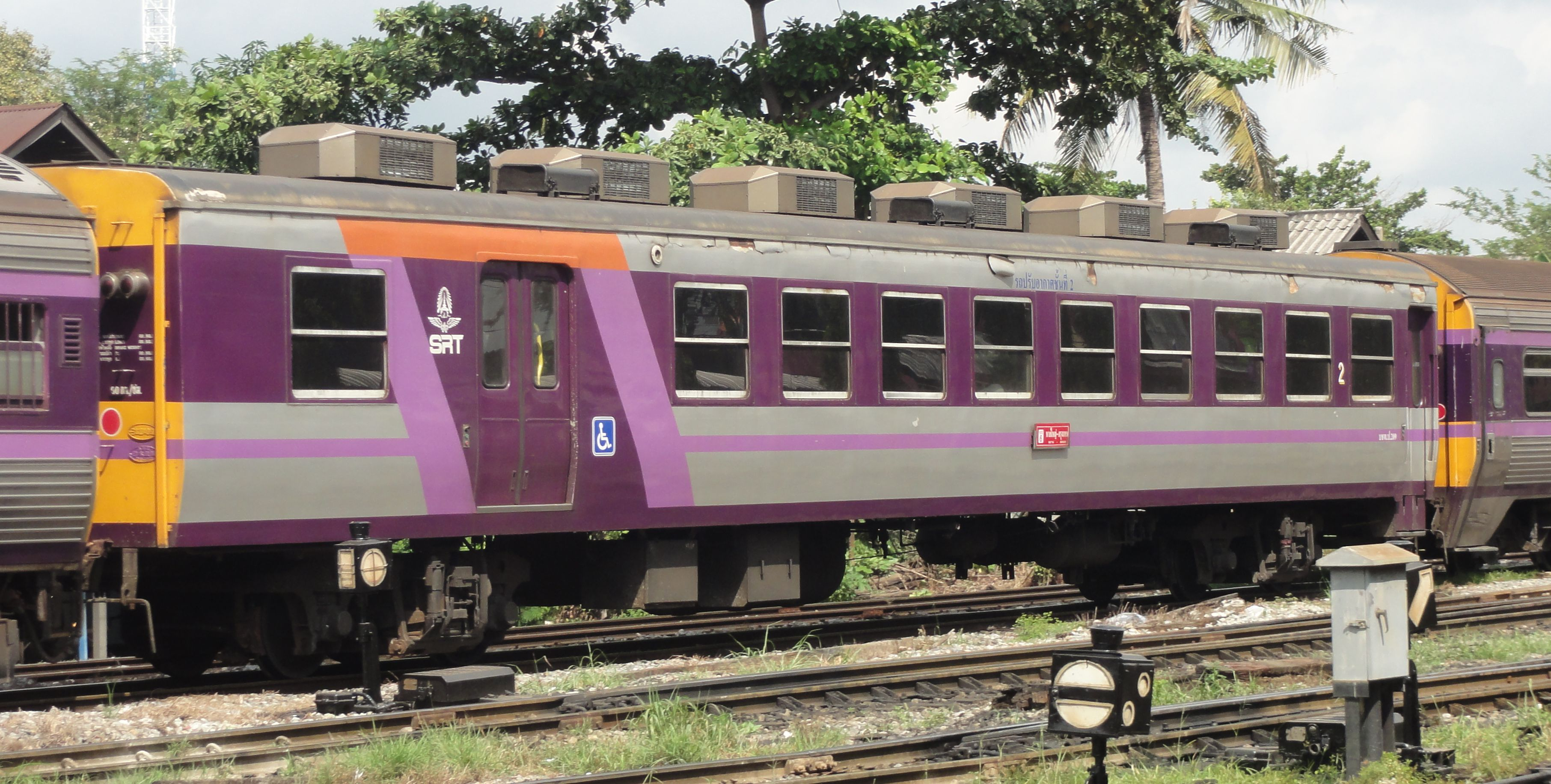
Second-class carriage

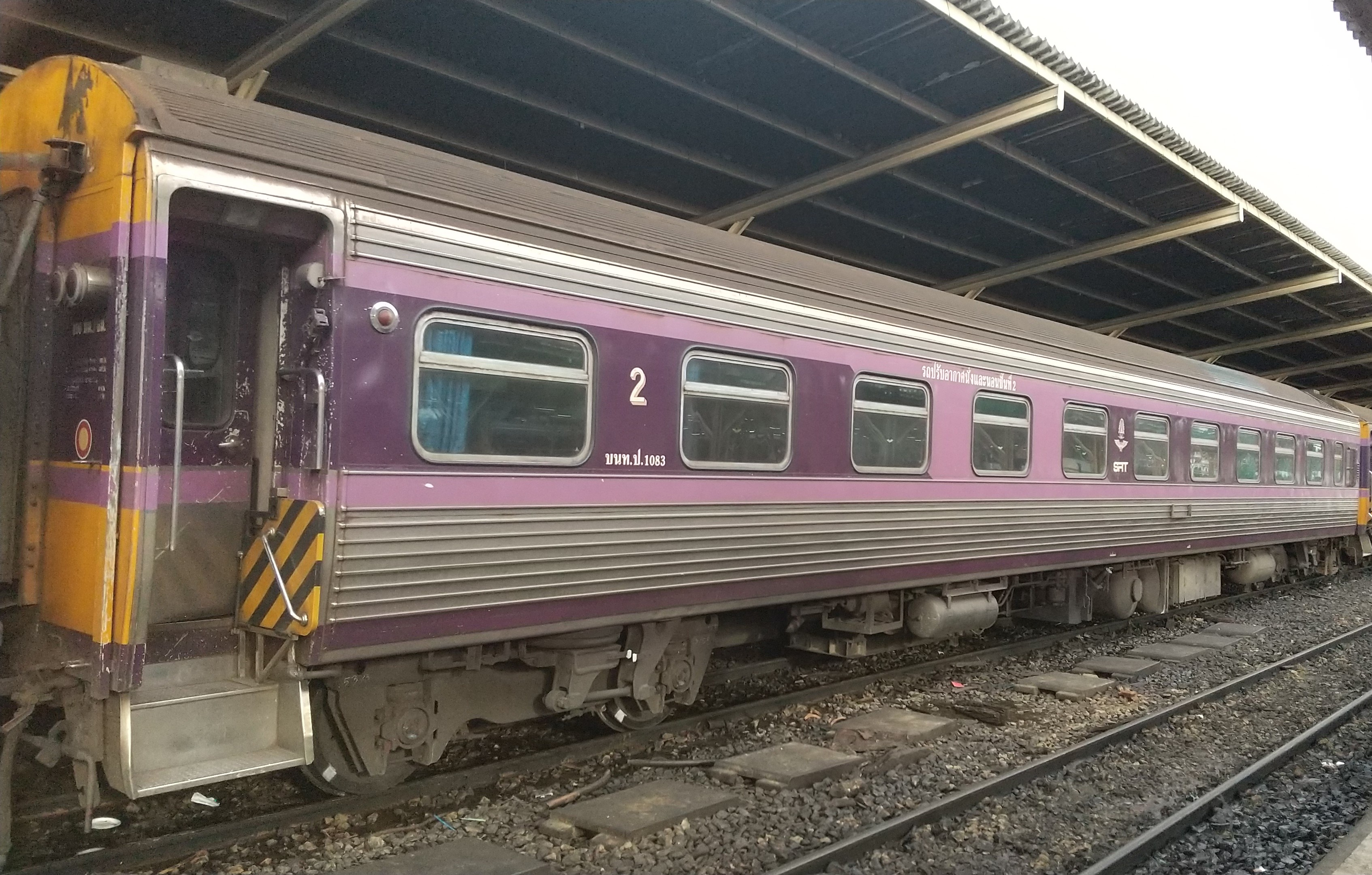
Second-class Daewoo sleeping carriage at Bangkok railway station

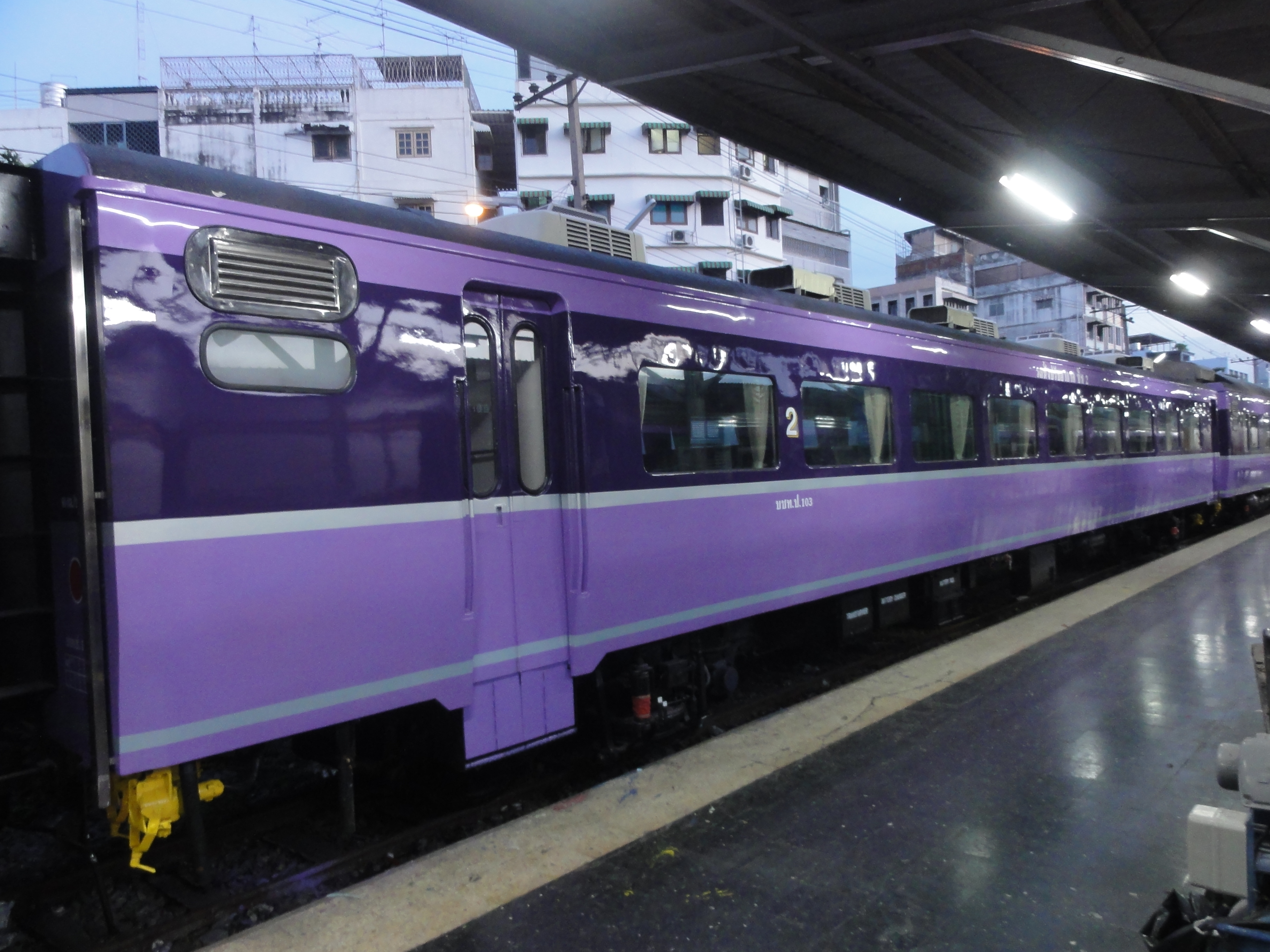
Second-class JNR sleeping carriage in original livery at Bangkok railway station

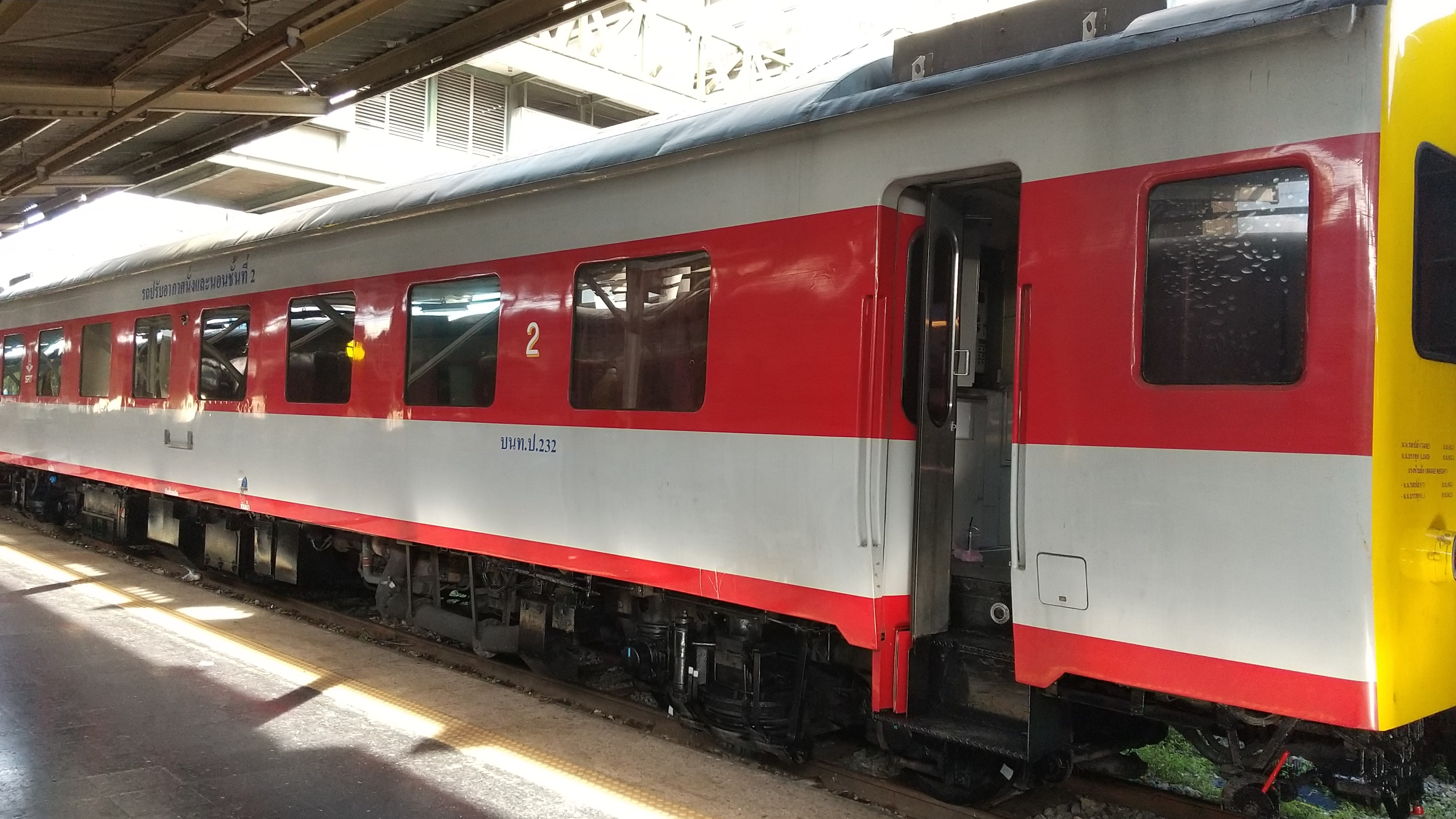
Second-class JNR sleeping carriage in current livery at Bangkok railway station

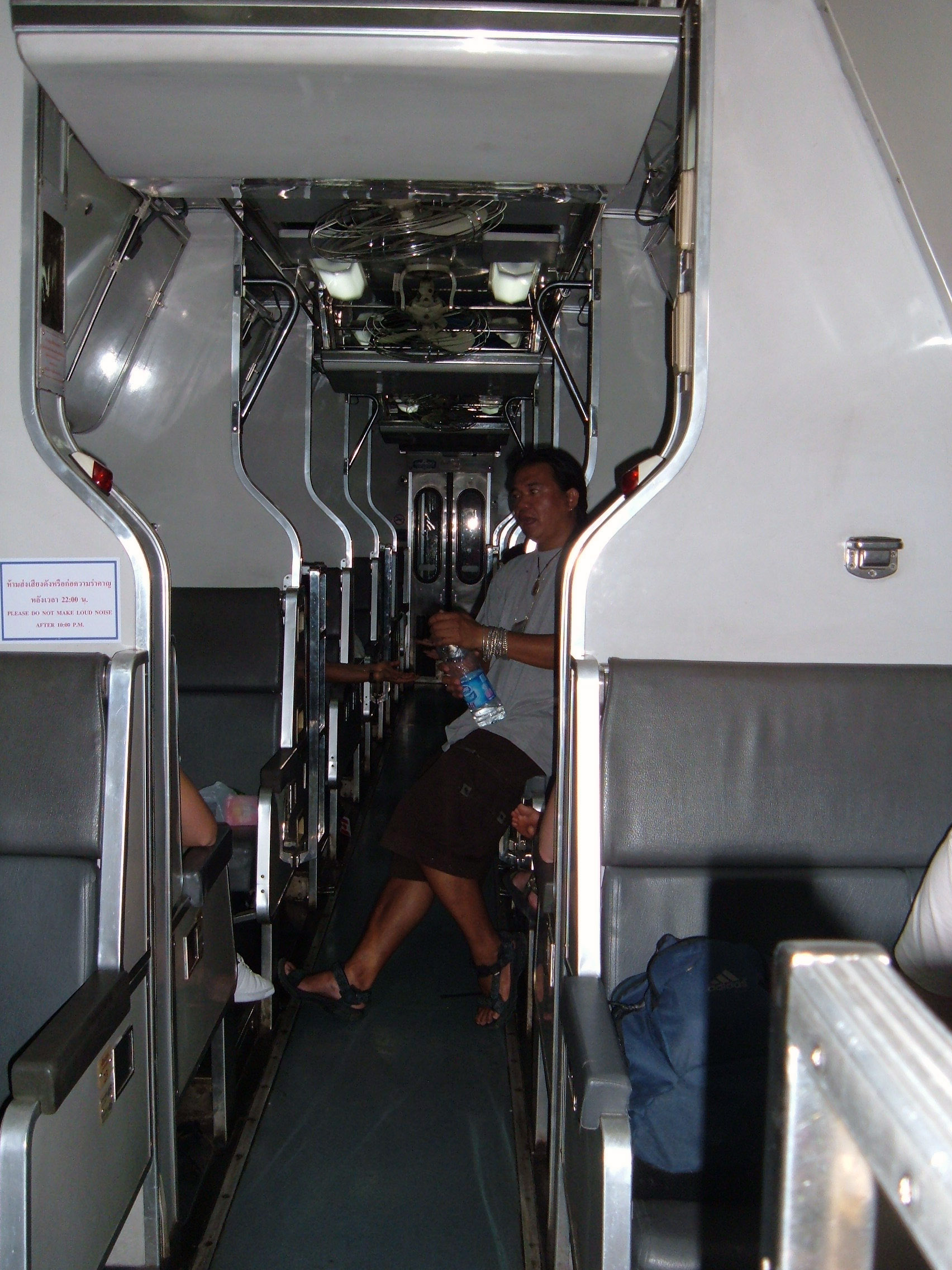
A passenger car of the Northern Line of the State Railway of Thailand

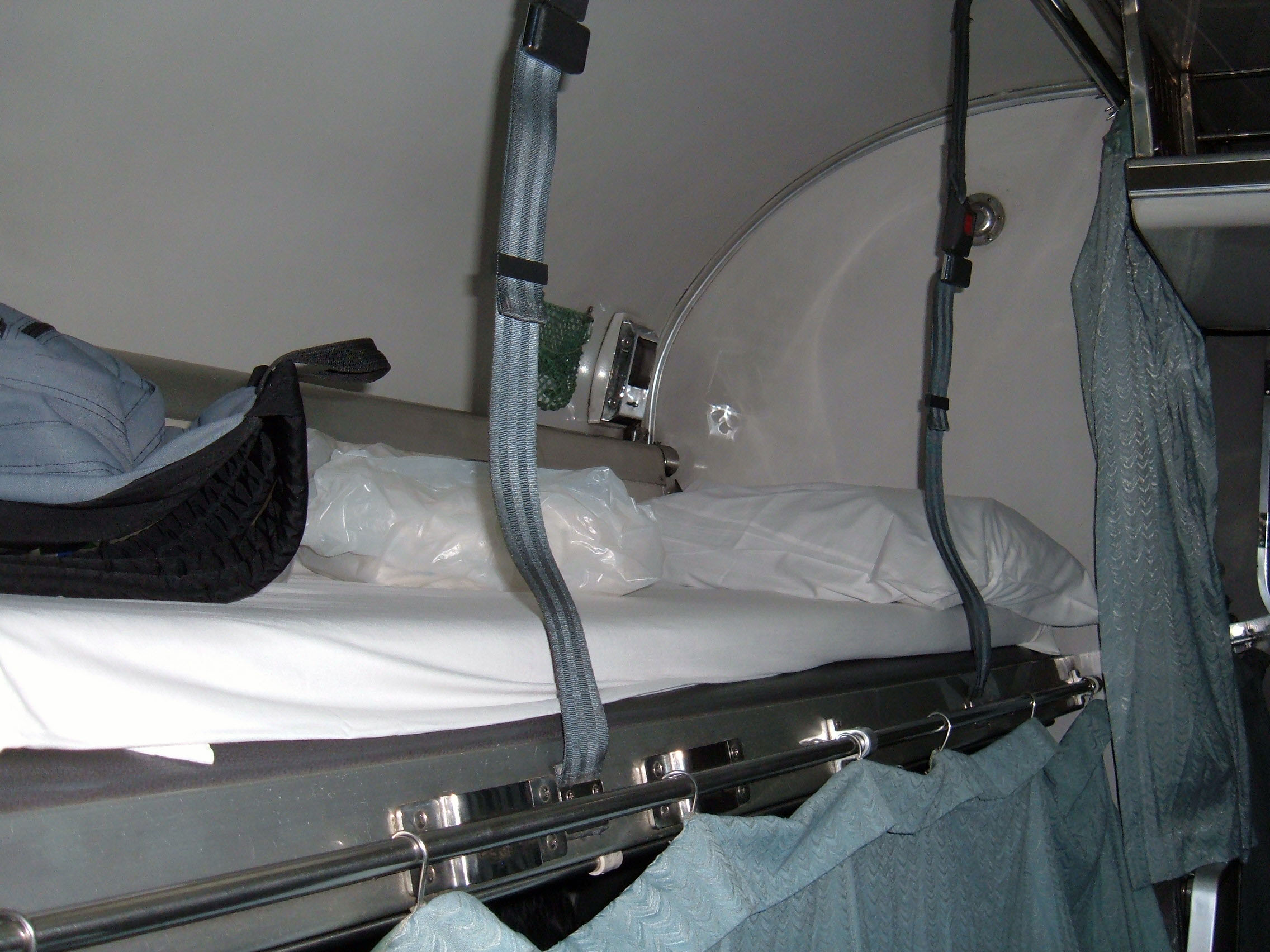
The bunk in a passenger car of the Northern Line of the State Railway of Thailand

SRT operates long-distance passenger services on the following lines:

==== Northern Line ====
- Bangkok-Ayutthaya-Lopburi-Nakhon Sawan-Phitsanulok-Lampang-Chiang Mai

==== Northeastern Line ====
- Bangkok-Ayutthaya-Saraburi-Nakhon Ratchasima-Khon Kaen-Udon Thani-Nong Khai-Vientiane (Laos)
- Bangkok-Ayutthaya-Saraburi-Nakhon Ratchasima-Buriram-Surin-Sisaket-Ubon Ratchathani

==== Eastern Line ====
- Bangkok-Chachoengsao-Prachinburi-Kabin Buri-Sa Kaeo-Aranyaprathet
- Bangkok-Chachoengsao-Chonburi-Pattaya-Sattahip

==== Southern Line ====
- Bangkok-Nakhon Pathom-Hua Hin-Surat Thani-Hat Yai-Padang Besar (Malaysia)(International Express)
- Bangkok-Nakhon Pathom-Hua Hin-Surat Thani-Hat Yai-Su-ngai Kolok
- Bangkok-Nakhon Pathom-Hua Hin-Surat Thani-Thung Song-Nakhon Si Thammarat
- Bangkok-Nakhon Pathom-Hua Hin-Surat Thani-Thung Song-Kantang
- Bangkok-Nakhon Pathom-Kanchanaburi-Nam Tok

=== International services ===
Until 2016, SRT operated international services to Butterworth in Penang, Malaysia, in conjunction with Malaysian state operator KTM. Direct trains from Bangkok now only run as far as Padang Besar, due to the opening of KTM ETS.

Since 2021, there 3 return trains operate from Hat Yai Junction and terminate at Padang Besar across the Malaysia–Thailand border. SRT has also historically allowed operation of the Eastern & Oriental Express on its tracks which runs from Singapore to Bangkok and vice versa, although trips in 2024 did not enter Thailand.

A link across the First Thai–Lao Friendship Bridge to Thanaleng railway station, near Vientiane, opened in March 2009. In December 2010, following Chinese plans to extend their standard-gauge railway network to Xishuangbanna on the China–Laos border and further into Laos, the Thai government agreed to start negotiations on building a standard-gauge network. This would initially involve two lines: from Bangkok to the Lao border, and a longer line from Bangkok along the peninsula to the Malay border. In 2024, long distance overnight train services between Bangkok and Vientiane Khamsavath railway station were started. Shuttle trains to Udon Thani are also being operated in conjunction with the Lao National Railway.

The rail link to Cambodia via Poipet from the railhead at Aranyaprathet was constructed in 1941, but was closed in 1961 due to strained Thai-Cambodian relations during the Cold War. The rail connection was repaired and reopened in April 2019. Cross-border services briefly ran until it was suspended by the outbreak of COVID-19. Currently, no cross-border services operate. and due to war between border of Cambodia result to temporary out of service.

Railway connections to Myanmar (Burma), notably the infamous Death Railway, are defunct.

==== Rail links to adjacent countries ====
- Malaysia - same 1,000 mm (3 ft 3 3/8 in) gauge
  - Padang Besar Checkpoint: open
  - Su-ngai Kolok- Rantau Panjang Checkpoint: tracks connected but rail checkpoint closed, may reopen.
- Laos - same 1,000 mm (3 ft 3 3/8 in) gauge
  - Thai-Lao Friendship Bridge at Nong Khai Province, across the Mekong River to Khamsavath railway station.
- Cambodia
  - Aranyaprathet-Poipet Checkpoint: tracks connected but rail checkpoint closed due to COVID-19 and due to 2025 Cambodian–Thai border crisis.
- Myanmar
  - Three Pagodas Pass Checkpoint: defunct, but projected extension will rebuild the route.
  - see also Death Railway

=== Commuter trains ===
The SRT operates commuter rail services from Bangkok along the Northern and Northeastern Lines up to Ayutthaya, Ban Phachi Junction, Lopburi and Kaeng Khoi Junction. Ten trains run along the route on a daily basis. A new service serving between Thon Buri and Salaya was launched on 22 October 2010, extending to Nakhon Pathom on 1 June 2022 to act as a feeder service for the SRT Light Red Line.

The Red Line project is a new commuter rail system also owned by the SRT and will replace portions of rail lines running through Bangkok, eliminating at-grade crossings. Currently, two lines operate: the Dark Red Line and the Light Red Line.

=== Freight ===
Thai railways transported around 11 million tons of freight per year in 2007–2012, which was around 2% of the total amount of freight moved by all modes of transportation. While it is possible for freight trains to travel between Thailand and the neighboring countries (Malaysia and Laos), the amount of international rail freight presently constitutes only a minuscule portion of Thailand's foreign trade. In 2012, merely 95 thousand tons of export cargo left Thailand by rail, as compared to 12 million tons of cargo exported by road, and 114 million tons of cargo exported by ship. For import, the rail transport's share was even smaller.

Thai railways transport both bulk freight (primarily oil products and construction materials) and containerized freight. Most of the freight movement is between Bangkok and sea ports (in particular, between the deepwater port of Laem Chabang and the container terminal in Lad Krabang, in Bangkok's eastern suburbs).

In an attempt to increase the railway's share of the nation's freight transportation market, in 2016 the SRT, in a joint project with Japan, started experimenting with small, 12-foot containers. It is thought that, being smaller than the standard 20-foot containers, these containers can be more easily transported by truck between a rail station and the end customer. These containers are being tried on two routes from Bangkok's Bang Sue station: a 722-km route to Lamphun Province in the north of the country, and a 433-km route to Khon Kaen in the northeast.

=== Excursion and tourist trains ===
SRT also operates special services aimed at tourists, such as the SRT Royal Blossom train, SRT KiHa 183 Excursions, steam train services and weekend Nam Tok Sai Yok Noi and Suan Son Pradipat province. Most of these special services feature special trains, and are priced at a premium, with added services.

Refurbished old KiHa 183 trains debuted on the SRT network, gifted by the JR Hokkaido Railway Company, are now some of the excursion train services, providing day and overnight tours to different provinces such as Ayutthaya, Hua Hin, Chacheongsao, Nakhon Nayok and Nam Tok Sai Yok Noi.

== Locomotives and multiple units ==
=== Active fleet ===
==== Diesel locomotives ====
Type	Manufacturer	Numbers	Year(s) built	Quantity built	Power	Max speed (km/h)	Image	Note
UM12C (GEK)	(United States) General Electric	4001-4050	1964 (4001–4040); 1966 (4041–4050)	50	1,320 hp (0.98 MW) (660 hp (0.49 MW)x2)	103		Refurbished around 2010–2011.
AD24C (ALS)	(France) Alstom	4101-4154	1974–1975	54	2,400 hp (1.79 MW)	90		First batch of AD24C locomotives. Some refurbished with new MTU 16V4000R41R or Caterpillar diesel engines.
AD24C (AHK)	(France) Alstom, (West Germany) Henschel and Krupp	4201-4230	1980	30	2,400 hp (1.79 MW)	100		Second batch of AD24C, built under license by Henschel and Krupp. Some refurbished with new MTU 16V4000R41R or Caterpillar diesel engines.
AD24C (ALD)	(France) Alstom	4301-4309	1983	9	2,400 hp (1.79 MW)	100		Third batch of AD24C. Some refurbished with Caterpillar diesel engines.
AD24C (ADD)	(France) Alstom	4401-4420	1985	20	2,400 hp (1.79 MW)	100		Fourth and last batch of AD24C. Some refurbished with new MTU 16V4000R41R or Caterpillar diesel engines.
8FA-36C (HID)	(Japan) Hitachi	4501-4522	1993	22	2,860 hp (2.13 MW) (1,430 hp (1.07 MW)x2)	100		First batch of Main Line Locomotive Program, used MAN Diesel engines in the short-term, then replaced by Cummins KTTA-50L engine, later modified to KTA-50L
CM22-7i (GEA)	(United States) General Electric	4523-4560	1995–1996	38	2,500 hp (1.86 MW) (1,250 hp (0.93 MW)x2)	100		Second batch of Main Line Locomotive Program, used Cummins KTA-50L engine. Some locomotives air-conditioned.
CSR SDA3	(China) CRRC Qishuyan	5101-5120	2013–2015	20	3,800 hp (2.83 MW)	120 But limited 100		5101-5120 all active in freight service Use Caterpillar C175-16 ACERT engines
CRRC CDA5B1 (QSY)	(China) CRRC Qishuyan	5201-5250	2022	50	3,218 hp	120		First 20 locomotives arrived in Thailand in January 2022. Use MTU 16V 4000R43L

==== Diesel multiple units ====
Type	Manufacturer	Numbers	Year built	Quantity built	Power (horsepower)	Max speed (km/h)	Image	Note
RHN	(Japan) Hitachi	1011-1048 (power cars); 11–48 (trailer cars)	1967	38+38	220	90		Now used as a Northeastern line commuter train. One unit donated to Cambodian Royal Railways.
THN	(Japan) Tokyu, Hitachi and Nippon Sharyo	1101–1140	1983	40	235	105		Similar to NKF.
NKF	(Japan) Nippon Sharyo, Hitachi, Fuji Heavy Industries, Kawasaki Heavy Industries, Niigata Tekkousho, and Kinki Sharyo	1201–1264, (center) 2101–2112	1985	64+12	235	105		Similar to THN, but with plastic chairs.
ASR	(United Kingdom) British Rail Engineering Limited, Derby Litchurch Lane Works	2501–2512, (center) 2113-2120	1991	12+8	285	160 km/h but Ministry of Transport limited the top speed to 120 km/h.		Metre gauge version of British Rail Class 158, with different gangways and couplers, and with inward-opening slam doors instead of plug doors. 3-car set until 2011, when all were refurbished with new seats, vinyl floors, an extra coach and new livery.
APD .20	(South Korea) Daewoo Heavy Industries	2513-2524 (center) 2121–2128 2515 and 2521 destroyed by accident in 2026	1995	12+8	298	120		First batch, narrow body.
APD .60	(South Korea) Daewoo Heavy Industries	2525–2544	1996	20+40	298	120		Second batch, wide body.
KiHa 183-0	(Japan) Fuji Heavy Industries		1981/1982	17	220~660	110		Donated by JR Hokkaido for SRT in 2021. They are used for tourism service.
KiHa 40/48	(Japan) Fuji Heavy Industries and Niigata Tekkō		1977–1983	20	217	95		Donation by JR East for SRT in 2023. Number donated: Kiha 40 11 trainset Kiha 48 9 trainset total 20-train set. They will run months and will run 6 trains daily between Don Mueong and Ayuttha and another 6 trains between Krung Thep Apiwhat Central Terminal and Ayutthaya after a successful 6-month trial run in 2026.

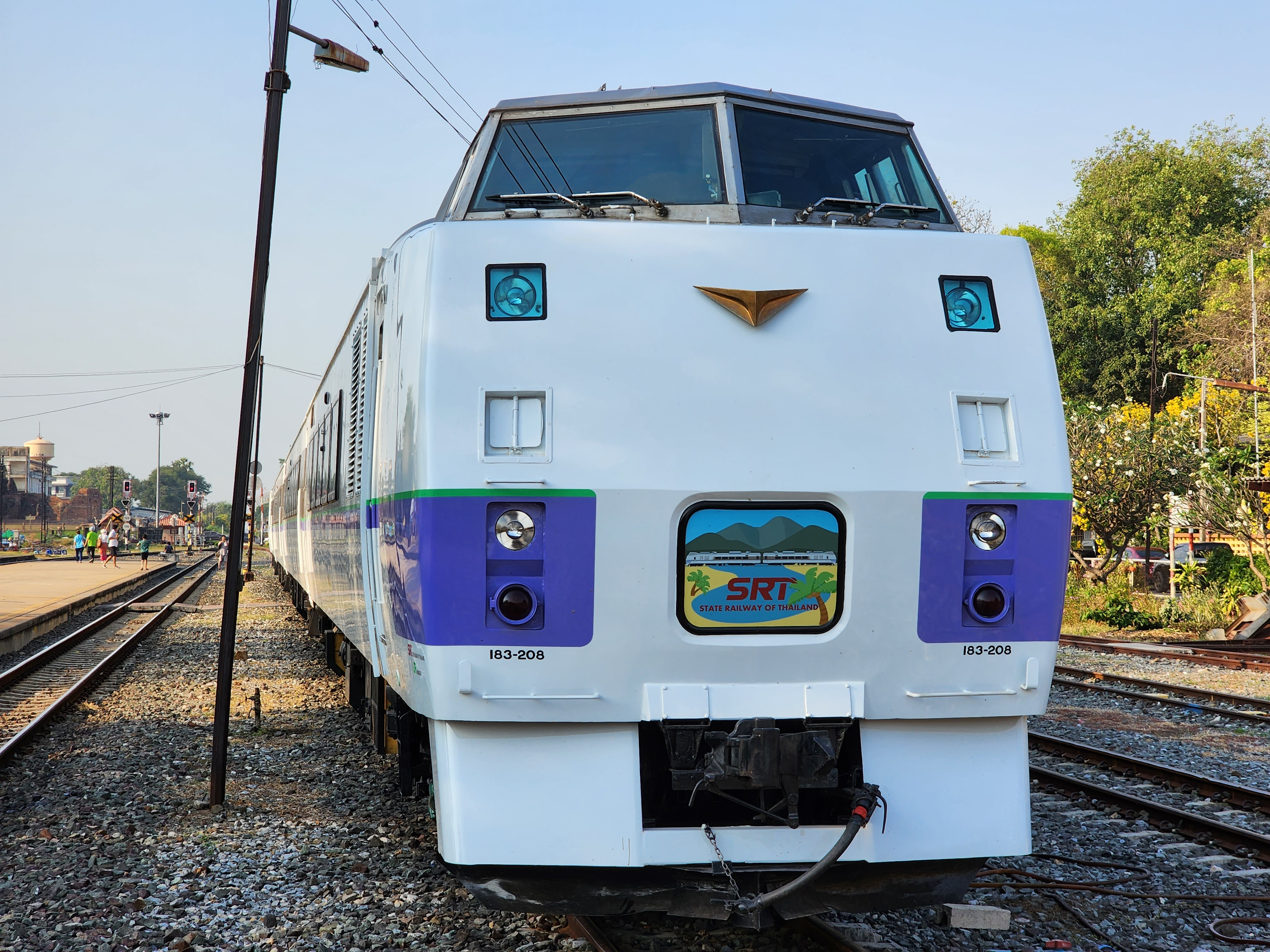
KIHA183 from JR Hokkaido in Thailand with SRT

==== Electric multiple units ====
Type	Manufacturer	Numbers	Year built	Quantity built	Power (horsepower)	Max speed (km/h)	Image	Note
AT100	(Japan) Hitachi		2019	25		160		Used in the SRT Dark Red Line and SRT Light Red Line. 15 units form 6-car sets, while units 10 form 4-car sets.

==== Steam locomotives ====
Used for special services only.

Type	Manufacturer	Numbers	Year built	Quantity built	Power (horsepower)	Max speed (km/h)	Image	Note
SRT Japanese Mikados	(Empire of Japan) Mitsubishi Heavy Industries, Hitachi, Nippon Sharyo, Kawasaki Heavy Industries Rolling Stock Company, Kisha Seizo	351–378, 901–970 (953 in storage)	1936–1951	98	1280	85		Used on special excursion services on Mother's Day, Father's Day, Chulalongkorn Memorial Day and SRT Founding Day.
SRT Japanese Pacifics	(Empire of Japan) Mitsubishi Heavy Industries, Hitachi, Nippon Sharyo, Kawasaki Heavy Industries Rolling Stock Company, Kisha Seizo	283–292, 821–850 (824 and 850 preserved in working order)	1942–1951	40	1280	100		Used on special excursion services on Mother's Day, Father's Day, Chulalongkorn Memorial Day and SRT Founding Day.
JNR Class C56	(Empire of Japan) Mitsubishi Heavy Industries, Hitachi, Nippon Sharyo, Kawasaki Heavy Industries Rolling Stock Company, Kisha Seizo	701–746 (713 and 715 preserved in working order)	1935–1939	46	592	75		Used on the Nam Tok Line (Death Railway) for the annual River Kwai Bridge Week Festival in Kanchanaburi.

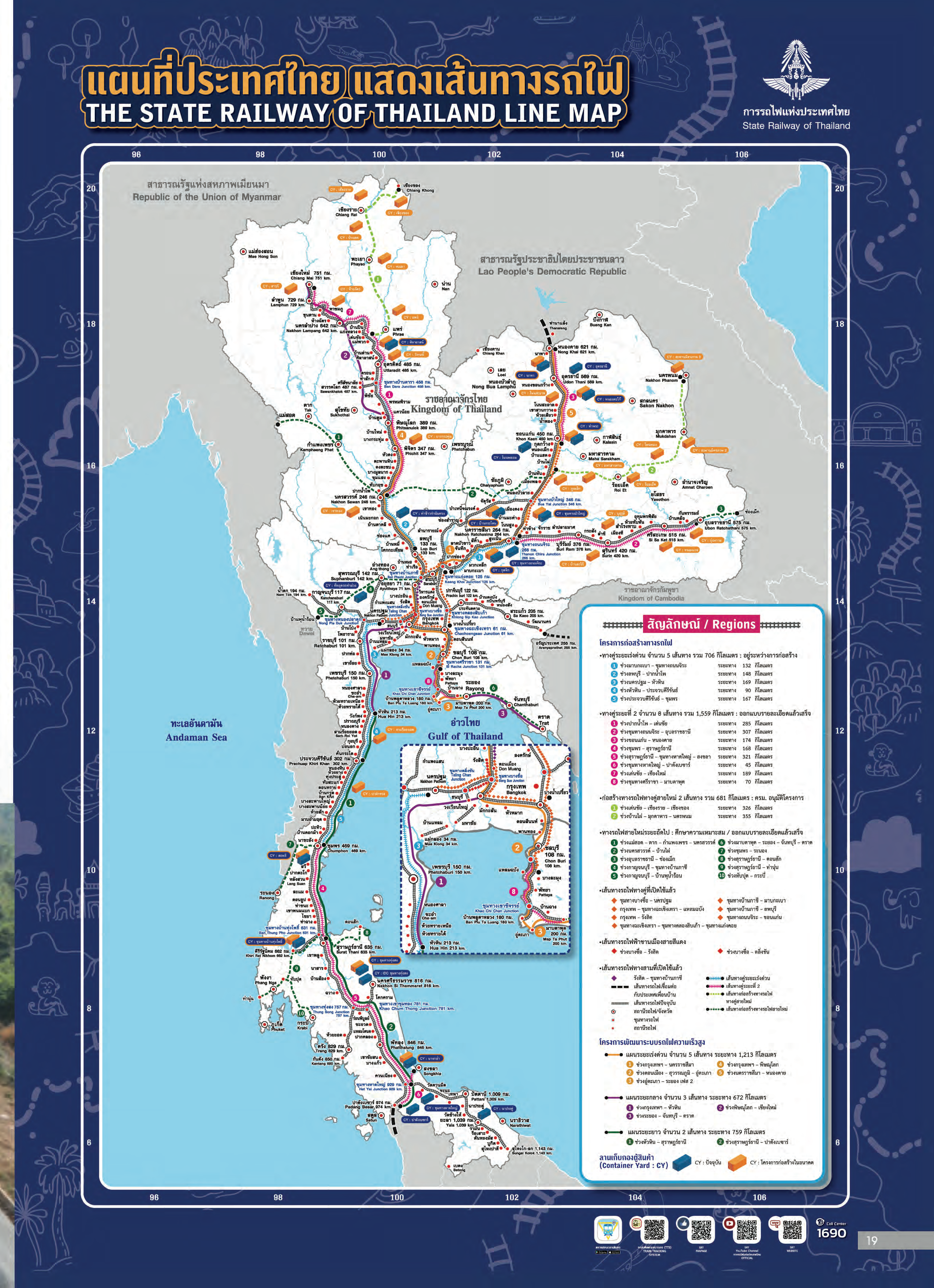
Lines in the future

== Future ==
=== Double tracking ===
In 2018, 91% of Thailand's 4,044 km rail network was a single-track railway. A government initiative to move air and road transport to rail passed a major milestone on 28 December 2017 when the SRT signed nine contracts costing 69.5 billion baht with private contractors to complete track duplication on 702 km of the SRT network. The government's aim is to reduce the nation's logistical overhead, some 1.75 trillion baht, by moving air and road freight to rail because moving a tonne of freight by rail costs 0.93 baht per kilometre compared with 1.72 baht by road, but 86 percent of Thailand's freight moves by road and only 2 percent by rail.

Completed double tracking projects:

- Kaeng Khoi Junction - Chacheongsao Junction
- Thanon Chira Junction - Khon Kaen
- Nakhon Pathom to Hua Hin, 169 km
- Hua Hin to Prachuap Khiri Khan, 84 km
- Prachuap Khiri Khan to Chumphon, 168 km
- Lopburi to Pak Nam Pho in Nakhon Sawan, 145 km

Under construction:

- Map Kabao in Saraburi Province to Thanon Chira Junction in Nakhon Ratchasima Province, 134 km (double-tracking)
- Khon Kaen to Nong Khai, 167 km (double-tracking)
- Den Chai - Chiang Khong (new line)
- Ban Phai - Nakhon Phanom (new line)

Cabinet approval is expected to allow the signing of contracts for phase two of the track duplication project by March 2018. The second phase will add a second track to 2,217 km of single track over nine rail links at a cost of 398 billion baht. Government plans call for an overall investment of 600 billion baht to create 2,588 km of double-track railway.

Phase 2 by 2029 (double tracking)

- 308 km Thanon Jira Junction - Ubon Ratchathani, costing 36 billion baht
- 285 km Pak Nam Pho - Den Chai, costing 59.3 billion baht
- 189 km Den Chai - Chiang Mai, costing 57.9 billion baht
- 168 km Chumphon - Surat Thani, costing 23 billion baht
- 321 km Surat Thani - Hat Yai Junction - Songkhla, costing 56.1 billion baht
- 45 km Hat Yai Junction - Padang Besar, costing 7.86 billion baht

Phase 3 (new routes)

- Chaiyaphum - Loei
- Pak Nam Pho - Ban Phai
- Mae Sot to Pak Nam Pho
- Suphan Buri to Ban Phachi Junction
- Rayong - Trat
- Hat Yai Junction - Su-ngai Kolok
- Khlong Sip Kao Junction – Aranyaprathet
- Nong Pla Duk Junction – Suphan Buri
- Suphan Buri - Ban Phachi Junction

==== Station demolition ====
The SRT board has approved a plan to demolish and rebuild 298 stations, six million baht each, as part of the track duplication. As of August 2019, the SRT board announced that the unique vanilla and maroon paints scheme would be replaced in the reconstructions of the stations with designs that "reflect local identities". Southern Line stations to the south would be painted blue, symbolizing the sea, and Northern Line stations to the north would be painted green, symbolizing forests.

=== High speed railways ===
==== Northern HSR: Bangkok–Phitsanulok–Chiang Mai (Japanese-Thai project) ====
Japan would provide Shinkansen technology for a high-speed rail link between Bangkok and the northern city of Chiang Mai. Phase 1 would connect Bangkok to Phitsanulok. It is estimated to cost 280 billion baht. Seven stations are planned for this segment: Bang Sue, Don Mueang, Ayutthaya, Lopburi, Nakhon Sawan, Phichit, and Phitsanulok. To reduce costs, Thai authorities have proposed reducing the number of stations, but the Japan International Cooperation Agency (JICA) has rejected this suggestion on the grounds that it defeats the original purpose of the project. This portion of the route was scheduled to be submitted to the Thai cabinet for financial approval in August 2018.

After an initial cooperation agreement was signed in 2015, the Thai government formally requested the technical and financial assistance of the Japanese government in late-2016 for the building of the Northern HSR line to Chiang Mai. The Japanese completed a feasibility study which estimated that the project will cost 420 billion baht to build.

A feasibility study by JICA in mid-2018 reported that the train as planned would run at a loss. JICA's study projects only 10,000 passengers per day on the route, as opposed to the 30,000 per day forecasted in the original planning proposals. To be profitable from ticket sales would require 50,000 fares per day.

The Thai government announced in September 2019 that it may cancel Bangkok-Chiang Mai high-speed rail project after private investors declined to invest. The cost of the 670 kilometre line is estimated to be 400 billion baht. Japan has turned down the project as a bad investment due to low passenger projections.

==== Eastern HSR: Bangkok–U-Tapao Airport ====
A HSR line to the eastern seaboard was first proposed in 1996 but there was no progress for over a decade. In 2009, the government requested the Office of Transport and Traffic Policy and Planning (OTP) to create a plan for new HSR network in Thailand that included an eastern HSR line to Rayong. The route was finalised before the 2011 election with the promise to begin construction the next year if the government was re-elected, but they lost the election. After the 2011 election, the new government reviewed all HSR plans and the SRT stated that the line would be tendered in early-2014. After the May 2014 coup there were further delays while the military government reviewed all HSR lines, initially deferring all projects. In early-2016, the government agreed to proceed with the eastern HSR route and suggested that it could be extended to Don Mueang International Airport beyond the terminus at Bang Sue Intercity Terminal thus providing a link with three airports. Extending the line would provide a link between Don Mueang Airport, Suvarnabhumi Airport, and U-Tapao International Airport in Ban Chang District.

During 2017, OTP and the Ministry of Transport in consultation with the SRT agreed that by extending the line to terminate at Don Mueang it would effectively include the long delayed extension of the Airport Rail Link (Bangkok) from Makkasan Station to Don Mueang Airport as part of the project. The Eastern Economic Corridor Office (EEC Office) in October 2017 finalised previous OTP plans to build the 10 station Eastern HSR line linking Don Mueang airport, Bang Sue, Makkasan, Suvarnabhumi Airport, Chonburi, Si Racha, Pattaya, U-Tapao Airport, and Rayong. In early-2018, the section to Rayong was excluded due to environmental and safety concerns and it was decided that the line would terminate at U-Tapao Airport.

The SRT stated that the first tenders for the Eastern HSR line are expected to be tendered by May 2018 with a four-month auction period before the contract is awarded. The cost of the project was estimated to be over 200 billion baht, of which the Thai Government would fund 123 billion baht and the private sector estimated to contribute 90 billion baht.

Two rival consortia vied for the airport link contract. The Charoen Pokphand (CP) Group-led consortium consisting of Italian-Thai Development, China Railway Construction Corporation Limited, CH. Karnchang, and Bangkok Expressway and Metro, won the project with a 224 billion baht bid in December 2018. Their winning bid is valid until 8 November 2019. Until 16 October 2019, the consortium had refused to sign the contract, citing land expropriation and eviction problems and the consortium's request that the government share the risk in the project. Negotiations were further complicated by the resignation of the entire board of the State Railway. On 16 October 2019, news reports announced that the CP consortium intends to sign the rail deal on 25 October. Tanit Sorat, Vice-chairman of the Employers' Confederation of Thai Trade and Industry, said that the contract signing delays are "...unlikely to affect the project because the government will carry out the project smoothly. The project was eventually approved in October 2019 as a public private partnership between the Thai government and Charoen Pokphand/China Railway Construction Corporation. The assets will revert to state ownership after 50 years.

==== Northeastern HSR: Bangkok–Nakhon Ratchasima–Nong Khai (Sino-Thai railway project) ====
In November 2014, Thailand and China signed a memorandum of understanding agreeing to construct the Thai portion of the transnational railway running from Kunming, China to the Gulf of Thailand. In November 2015, both parties agreed to a division of labour. Under the framework, a joint venture would be set up to run the project. China would conduct feasibility studies, design the system, construct tunnels and bridges, and lay track. Thailand would conduct social and environmental impact studies, expropriate land for construction, handle general civil engineering and power supply, and supply construction materials.

Once built, China would operate and maintain the system for the first three years of operation. Between the third and the seventh years, both countries would share responsibility. Later Thailand would take on responsibility with China as adviser. China would train Thai personnel to operate and maintain the system.

Dual standard-gauge tracks would be laid throughout the project. In Thailand, two routes would diverge at a junction in Kaeng Khoi District in Saraburi Province. One to connect Bangkok to Kaeng Khoi. The other route to connect Kaeng Khoi with Map Ta Phut of Rayong Province. From Kaeng Khoi tracks would lead north to Nakhon Ratchasima and on to Nong Khai Province. Construction would be divided into four sections: Bangkok-Kaeng Khoi, Map Ta Phut-Kaeng Khoi, Kaeng Khoi-Nakhon Ratchasima, Nakhon Ratchasima-Nong Khai.

Construction of Thailand's 873-kilometre-long portion of the railway system started in December 2017 and the Phase 1 line is due to open in 2023. It will connect to a 417 km line from Vientiane to the northern Lao border and a 520 km line from the Lao border to Kunming.

==== Southern HSR: Bangkok–Hua Hin ====
This line would link Bangkok with Hua Hin. It would be 211 km long and estimated costs in 2016 were 152 billion baht.

== See also ==
- Rail transport in Thailand
