= Ban Phai–Nakhon Phanom Line =

Overview
- Status: Under construction
- Owner: State Railway of Thailand
- Termini: Ban Phai; Nakhon Phanom
- Stations: 14

Service
- Type: Inter-city rail
- System: Northern Line
- Operator(s): State Railway of Thailand

History
- Opened: 2028

Technical
- Line length: 347 km (216 mi)
- Number of tracks: 2
- Track gauge: 1,000 mm (3 ft 3 3/8 in) metre gauge
- Operating speed: 180 km/h (110 mph)

The Ban Phai–Nakhon Phanom railway line is a new double-track railway project of the State Railway of Thailand and an extension of the Northeastern Railway Line. It will branch off from the Chira–Nong Khai Junction section at Ban Nong Waeng Rai Junction Railway Station in Ban Phai District, Khon Kaen Province, and terminate at the Friendship Bridge 3 Railway Station in Nakhon Phanom Province.

== History ==
The construction project for the double-track railway, Ban Phai, Mukdahan, Nakhon Phanom, according to the original plan, will take 4 years to complete, with a total budget of 66,848.33 million baht.

=== Sequence of events ===
Future Schedule
Year	Month	event	
2014		Design project details	
2019	May	The Cabinet approves the project.	
2020	April	The National Environment Board has approved the EIA for the project.	
2021	March	The State Railway of Thailand announced the results of the bidding for two contracts of the project.	
2021	September	Royal Decree on the expropriation of land for the construction of the Ban Phai-Nakhon Phanom double-track railway line	
2021	December 29	Signed a contract for the construction of the Ban Phai-Nakhon Phanom railway line	
2022		Expropriate land to support construction (expropriate area approximately 17,499 rai, passing through a total of 6 provinces, 19 districts, 70 sub-districts) Expropriation value 10,080.33 million baht	
2023	March	Construction in progress	
2024		Construction in progress	
2025	August	Contract 1	Cumulative plan=72.450% Cumulative performance=42.718% Slower than plan=-29.732%
2025	August	Contract 2	Cumulative plan=63.646% Cumulative performance=6.901% Slower than plan=-56.745%
2025	August	Project Overview	Cumulative plan=67.952% Cumulative performance=24.418% Slower than plan=-43.534%

== List of stations and stops ==
There are a total of 14 railway stations, 1 railway junction, namely Ban Nong Waeng Rai Railway Junction, where every station is a district or provincial railway station.

Station / Stop Name	Distance from the BP.	Station level	Location			note
Station / Stop Name	Distance from the BP.	Station level	subdistrict	district	province	note
Ban Phai	0	2	Ban Phai	Ban Phai	Khon Kaen	Connect to Northeastern Nong Khai Main Line
Ban Phai	0	2	Nai Mueang	Ban Phai	Khon Kaen	Connect to Northeastern Nong Khai Main Line
Ban Nong Waeng Rai Junction	0.300	3	Nai Mueang	Ban Phai	Khon Kaen	
Phu Lek	10.072	3	Phu Lek	Ban Phai	Khon Kaen	Container yard
Na Pho Halt	20.982	Halt	Na Pho	Kudrang	Maha Sarakham	
Kudrang	30.441	3	Kudrang	Kudrang	Maha Sarakham	
Borabue	45.812	2	Borabue	Borabue	Maha Sarakham	
Nong No Halt	59.310	Halt	Nong No	Maha Sarakham City	Maha Sarakham	
Maha Sarakham	69.117	1	Waeng Nang	Maha Sarakham City	Maha Sarakham	Container yard
Khwao Halt	78.420	Halt	Khwao	Maha Sarakham City	Maha Sarakham	
Si Somdet Halt	85.429	Halt	Bodhi Sai	Sri Somdet	Roi Et	
Si Kaew Halt	85.429	Halt	Si Kaew	Roi Et Province	Roi Et	
Roi Et	104.897	1	Yang Yai	Janghan	Roi Et	Container storage area
Chiang Khwan	117+700	3	Pra Thadu	Chiang Khwan	Roi Et	
Po Chai	129.093	3	Chiang Mai	Pho Chai	Roi Et	
Amphoe Phon Thong	150.478	2	Waeng	Phon Thong	Roi Et	Container yard
Moei Wadi Halt	159.956	Halt	Kok Pho	Nong Pok	Roi Et	
Nong Pok	175.945	3	Nong Pok	Nong Pok	Roi Et	
Khok Sawang Halt	183.285	Halt	Khok Sawang	Nong Pok	Roi Et	
Hong Chaeng Halt	197.765	Halt	Hong Chaeng	Leing Nok Tha	Yasothon	
Loeng Nok Tha	209.666	2	Kudhae	Leing Nok Tha	Yasothon	
Nikhom Kham Soi	223.100	3	Na Kok	Kham Soi Industrial Estate	Mukdahan	
Ban Bong Daeng Halt	228.100	Halt	Nong Waeng	Kham Soi Industrial Estate	Mukdahan	
Mukdahan	247.176	1	Mukdahan	Mukdahan City	Mukdahan	
Ban Dan Kham Halt	250.475	Halt	Mukdahan	Mukdahan City	Mukdahan	
Friendship Bridge 2	254.700	3	Bang Sai Yai	Mukdahan City	Mukdahan	Container storage area
Wan Yai	267.899	3	Wan Yai	Wan Yai	Mukdahan	
That Phanom	291.276	2	That Phanom	That Phanom	Nakhon Phanom	
Renu Nakhon	303.948	3	Phon Thong	Renu Nakhon	Nakhon Phanom	
Na Thon Halt	315.426	Halt	Na Thon	That Phanom	Nakhon Phanom	
Ban Klang Halt	320.022	Halt	Ban Klang	That Phanom	Nakhon Phanom	
Nakhon Phanom	343.461	1	Na Sai	Nakhon Phanom	Nakhon Phanom	
Friendship Bridge 3	354.783	3	At Samat	Nakhon Phanom	Nakhon Phanom	Container storage area
End of railway track, km 354.783

== Construction contract ==
Contract	Period	Distance (kilometers)	Auction winner	Progress 6.079% (Updated as of September 2024)
1	Ban Phai-Nong Phok	180	The A.S.-C.Thawee & Associates Joint Venture consists of A.S. Associate Engineering (1964) Co., Ltd., C.Thawee Construction Co., Ltd., TBTC Joint Venture Co., Ltd., Sermsongwan Construction Co., Ltd., and K.S. Joint Venture Co., Ltd.	12.16%
2	Nong Phok - Friendship Bridge 3	175	The Unique Joint Venture consists of Unique Engineering and Construction Public Company Limited, P.C.E.T. Company Limited, Thai Pikon and Industry Company Limited, and Watcharakhajorn Company Limited.	0.257%

== Construction progress ==
Date	Progress	Advancement by
January 2025	21.726%	
February 2025	23.803%	2.077%
March 2025	26.139%	2.336%
April 2025	31.368%	5.229%
May 2025	34.116%	2.748%
June 2025	37.585%	3.469%
July 2025	40.841%	3.256%
August 2025	42.718%	1.877%
September 2025	44.705%	1.987%
October 2025	45.873%	1.168%
November 2025	47.081%	1.208%
