= Khum Thong subdistrict =

Coordinates: 13.722055°N 100.868940°E

Khum Thong ขุมทอง
- Khwaeng
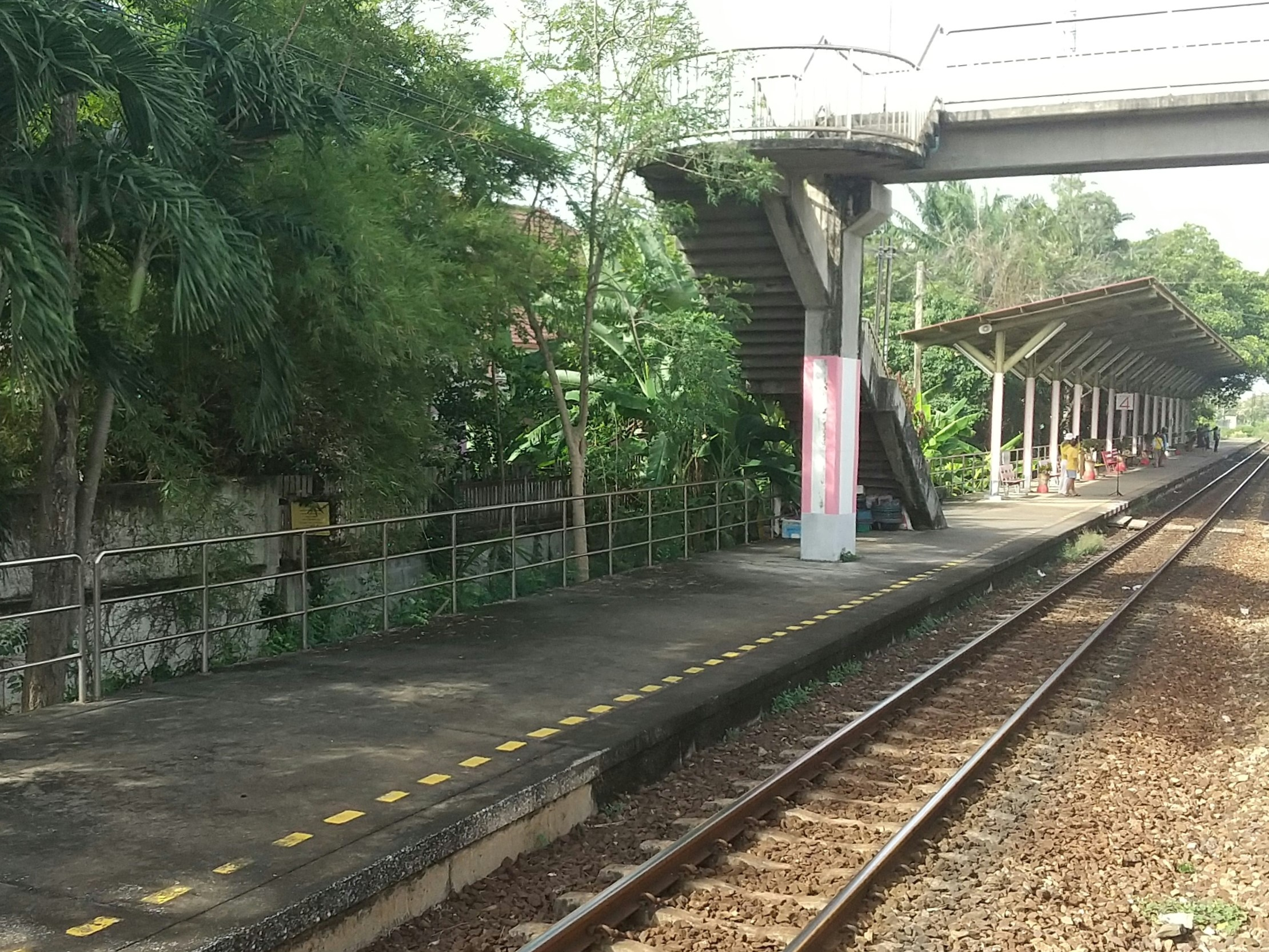
- Khlong Luang Phaeng railway station, Khum Thong in late 2022

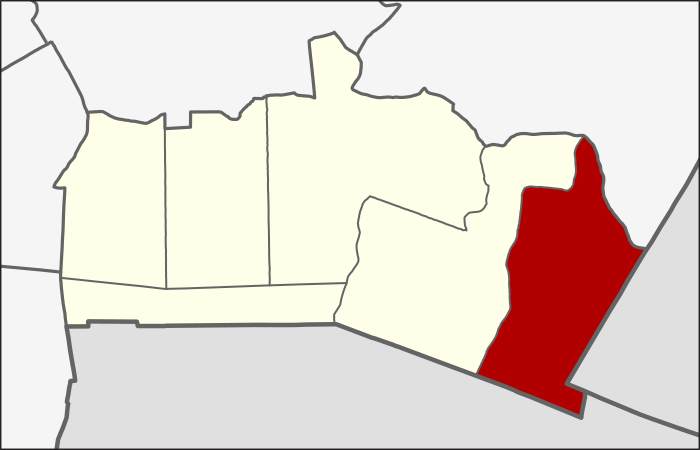
- Location in Lat Krabang District
- Country: Thailand
- Province: Bangkok
- Khet: Lat Krabang

Area
  - Total: 21.695 km^{2} (8.376 sq mi)

Population (2019)
  - Total: 8,171
- Time zone: UTC+7 (ICT)
- Postal code: 10520
- TIS 1099: 101106

Khum Thong (Thai: ขุมทอง, pronounced [kʰǔm tʰɔ̄ːŋ]) is a khwaeng (subdistrict) of Lat Krabang District, in Bangkok, Thailand. In 2019, it had a total population of 8,171 people.
