= Khlong Luang Phaeng railway station =

Railway station in Thailand

Coordinates: 13°43′12.9″N 100°51′47.3″E

Khlong Luang Phaeng คลองหลวงแพ่ง
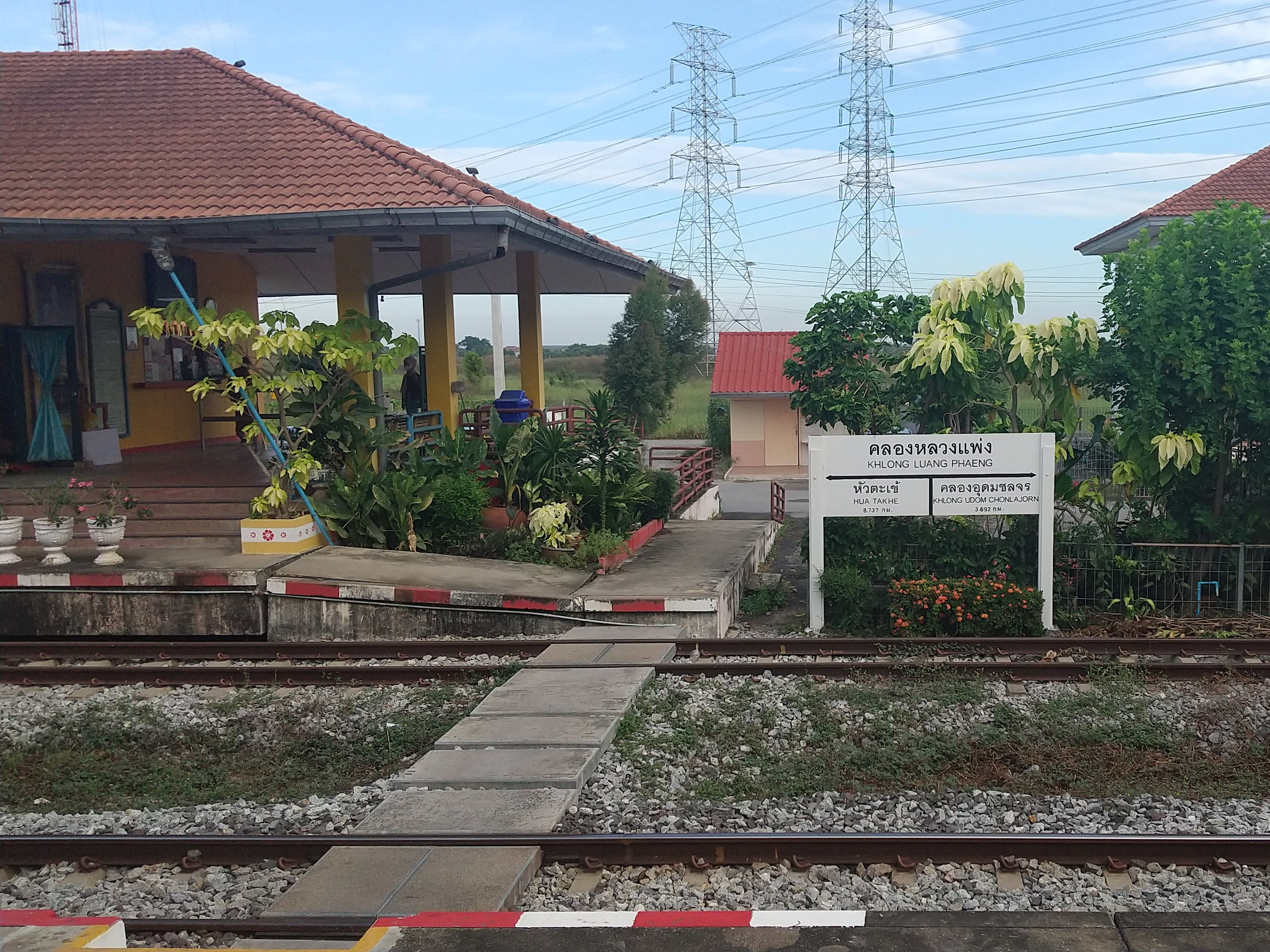

General information
- Location: Khum Thong-Lam Toiting Rd, Khum Thong Subdistrict, Lat Krabang District, Bangkok
- Owner: State Railway of Thailand (SRT)
- Line: Eastern Line

Other information
- Station code: คพ.

Services
| Preceding station | State Railway of Thailand | Following station |
|---|---|---|
| Hua Takhe towards Hua Lamphong | Eastern Line | Khlong Udom Chonlajorn Halt towards Chuk Samet or Poipet (Cambodia) |
Location

Khlong Luang Phaeng railway station (Thai: สถานีรถไฟคลองหลวงแพ่ง) is a railway station in central Thailand, located in the Khum Thong Subdistrict, Lat Krabang District near the boundary between Bangkok and Chachoengsao Province.

This station is a third class railway station and is located 39.50 km (about 24 mi) from Hua Lamphong railway station, and considered the last stop of the eastern line in Bangkok's area.
