= Rail transport in Bangkok =

Railway system in the Thai capital

Thailand's capital Bangkok has been served by rail transit since 1897 and today hosts a full complement of intercity, commuter and metro lines.

== History ==
Bangkok's first rail line was the private Paknam Railway linking Bangkok to Samut Prakan which opened in 1893.

Electric trams served Bangkok from 1894 to 1968. At the turn of the 20th century, King Rama V's new tram network employed foreign engineers and technicians, especially from Denmark.

The State Railway of Thailand (SRT) was founded in 1890 and operated its first train service in 1897 The SRT remains the only railway operator that operates services between Bangkok Metropolitan Region and other parts of the country.

Proposals for the development of rapid transit in Bangkok date back to 1975. One such was for the failed Lavalin Skytrain. A rapid-transit network finally opened in 1999, with the Sukhumvit Line and Silom Line of the BTS Skytrain.

Since then, a number of additional lines have opened. In 2004, the Blue Line became the first with an underground section. In 2010 the Airport Rail Link connected Phaya Thai station with Suvarnabhumi Airport. In that year Bangkok BRT also began operation. In 2016, the Purple Line opened. In 2020, the Gold Line opened. In 2021, the SRT Red Lines, consisting of SRT Dark Red Line and SRT Light Red Line, began operation.

In 2023, the country's first two monorail lines, the Yellow Line and Pink Line, opened.

== Rapid transit ==
Bangkok is currently served by four rapid-transit systems: the BTS Skytrain, the MRT, the Airport Rail Link, and the SRT Red Lines.

System	Began operation	Lines in operation	Lengths in operation	Stations in operation	Operators
BTS Skytrain	1999	3	100 km (62. 2 mi)	63	BTSC under concession from BMA
MRT	2004	4	135.9 km (84.4 mi)	107	BEM (Blue Line and Purple Line) Eastern Bangkok Monorail (Yellow Line) under concession from MRTA Northern Bangkok Monorail (Pink Line) under concession from MRTA
Airport Rail Link	2010	1	28.6 km (17.8 mi)	8	Asia Era One under concession from SRT
SRT Red Lines	2021	2	41 kilometres (25 mi)	14	SRT
Total		10	275.55 km (171.22 mi)	162	

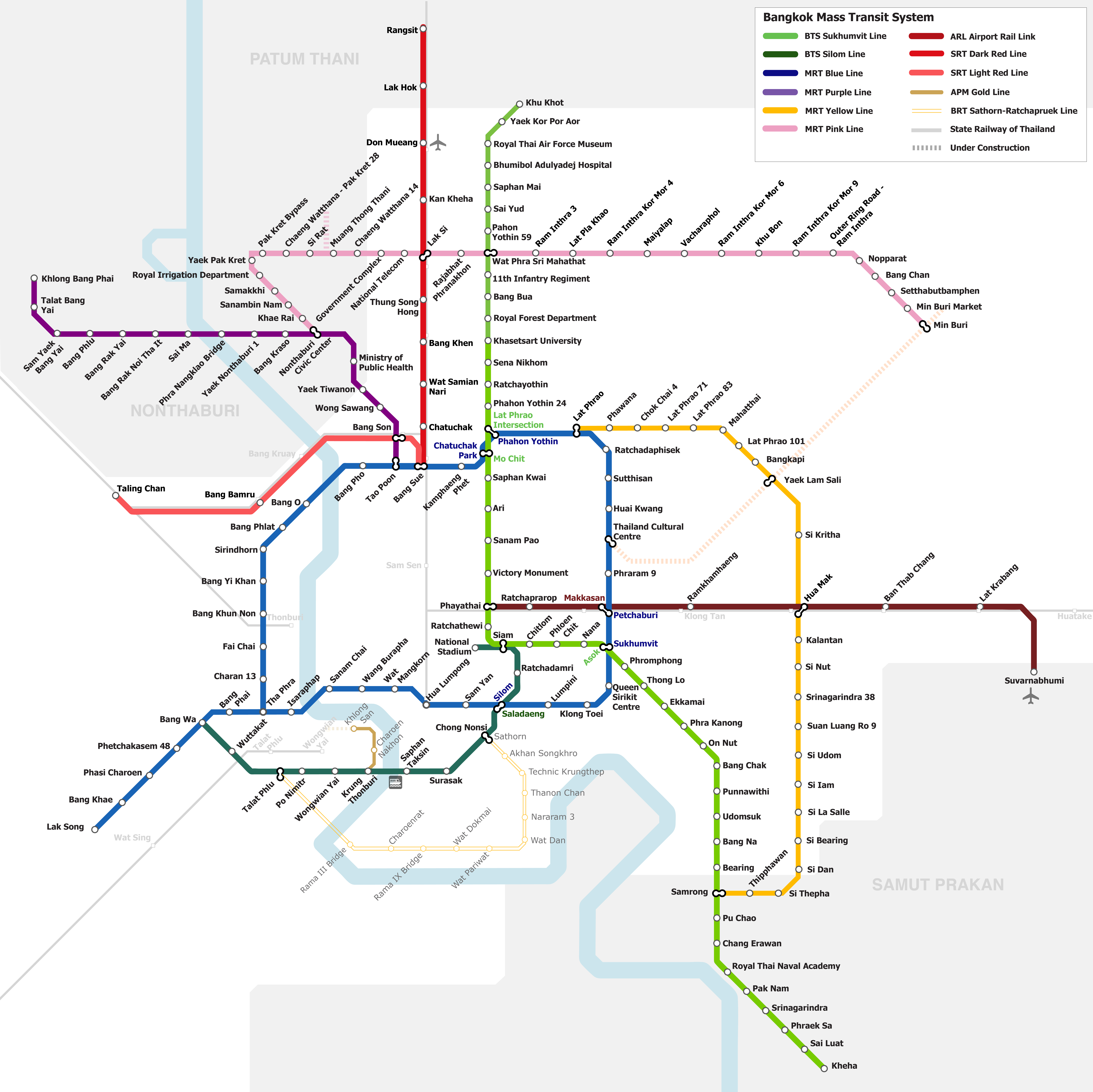
Map of current & future Bangkok Mass Rapid network as of June 2023

=== Networks ===
==== BTS Skytrain ====
The Skytrain consists of three lines, totalling 70.05 kilometers (43.53 mi). The Sukhumvit Line runs southwards from Khu Khot Station along Phahon Yothin Road and then eastwards along Sukhumvit Road to Kheha Station in Samut Prakan. The Silom Line runs eastwards from National Stadium Station in Pathum Wan District, then southwest along Ratchadamri, Si Lom, Narathiwat Ratchanakharin and Sathon Roads, crossing the Chao Phraya passing Wong Wian Yai Station in Khlong San towards Bang Wa Station in Phasi Charoen District. Both lines are elevated, and interchange at Siam Station in Pathum Wan. The Gold Line runs along Charoen Nakhon Road in Khlong San from Krung Thon Buri Station, which interchanges with the Silom Line, to Khlong San Station.

==== MRT ====
The MRT (Metropolitan Rapid Transit) system opened in July 2004, and currently consists of four lines, the Blue Line (partially underground heavy rail), Purple Line (above-ground medium capacity rail) and Yellow Line and Pink Line (monorail). The Blue Line runs for 37.1 kilometres (23.1 mi) from Tao Poon Station in a southward arc through the east along Ratchadaphisek Road, via Hua Lamphong, where it connects to the central railway station, to Lak Song. It has 38 stations, and connects to the BTS system at BTS stations Mo Chit, Asok, Sala Daeng and Bang Wa. The Blue Line was extended to form a circle in 2020. The Purple Line opened in 2016.

Although initial passenger numbers were low, these systems have become indispensable to many commuters. The BTS reported an average of 392,167 daily trips in 2010, while the MRT had 178,334 passenger trips per day. However, relatively high fare prices have kept these systems inaccessible to a portion of the population. The Pink and Yellow monorail lines opened in 2023.

==== Airport Rail Link ====
The Airport Rail Link, opened in August 2010 after many delays, connects the city centre to Suvarnabhumi Airport in Samut Prakan Province to the east. It is operated by the SRT, and offers services between the airport and Makkasan where it connects with Phetchaburi Station of the MRT. It terminates at Phaya Thai Station, where it connects to the BTS. Its eight stations span a distance of 29 kilometres (18 mi).

==== Red Lines and commuter rail ====
The Red Lines, which opened in 2021 along with the Krung Thep Aphiwat Central Terminal, serve the Bangkok Metropolitan Region. It consists of two lines, the Dark Red Line and Light Red Line.

=== Lines in operation ===
Line	System	Stations	Length	Terminus	Daily ridership	Began operation	
Line	System	Stations	Length	Terminus	Daily ridership	Initial part	Last extension
Sukhumvit line	BTS Skytrain	47	53.58 km (33.29 mi)	Khu Khot ↔ Kheha	910,866	1999	2020
Silom line	BTS Skytrain	14	14.67 km (9.12 mi)	National Stadium ↔ Bang Wa	910,866	1999	2021 (infill station)
Gold Line	BTS Skytrain	3	1.8 km (1.1 mi)	Krung Thon Buri ↔ Khlong San	8,091	2020	–
Blue Line	Metropolitan Rapid Transit (MRT)	38	47 km (29 mi)	Tha Phra ↔ Tao Poon ↔ Lak Song	498,709	2004	2019
Purple Line	Metropolitan Rapid Transit (MRT)	16	23.6 km (14.7 mi)	Khlong Bang Phai ↔ Tao Poon	76,171	2016	–
Yellow Line	Metropolitan Rapid Transit (MRT)	23	28.7 km (17.8 mi)	Samrong ↔ Lat Phrao	43,954	2023	
Pink Line	Metropolitan Rapid Transit (MRT)	30	34.5 km (21.4 mi)	Nonthaburi Civic Center ↔ Min Buri		2023	
Airport Rail Link	Airport Rail Link	8	28.6 km (17.8 mi)	Phaya Thai ↔ Suvarnabhumi	76,097	2010	–
Dark Red Line	SRT Red Lines	10	26 km (16 mi)	Bang Sue ↔ Rangsit	27,337	2021	–
Light Red Line	SRT Red Lines	4	15 km (9.3 mi)	Bang Sue ↔ Taling Chan	27,337	2021	–
Total			238.95 km (148.48 mi)				

=== Future expansion ===
The entire Mass Rapid Transit Master Plan in Bangkok Metropolitan Region consists of eight main lines and four feeder lines totalling 508 kilometres (316 mi) to be completed by 2029.

New lines under construction are the Orange Line and an extension to the Purple Line and extensions to the Airport Rail Link.

Lines under construction

Line	System	Stations	Length	Terminus	Planned opening date
Purple Line Extension	Metropolitan Rapid Transit (MRT)	17	22.78 km (14.15 mi)	Tao Poon ↔ Khru Nai	2029
Orange Line Eastern Section	Metropolitan Rapid Transit (MRT)	17	21 km (13 mi)	Thailand Cultural Centre ↔ Yaek Rom Klao	2027
Orange Line Western Section	Metropolitan Rapid Transit (MRT)	11	13.1 km (8.1 mi)	Thailand Cultural Centre ↔ Bang Khun Non	2030
Dark Red Line Extension	SRT Red Lines	4	10.3 km (6.4 mi)	Rangsit ↔ Thammasart University (Rangsit Campus)	2029
Light Red Line Extension	SRT Red Lines	6	12.64 km (7.85 mi)	Taling Chan ↔ Salaya; with two infill stations	2029
Light Red Line Branch Line	SRT Red Lines	3	5.86 km (3.64 mi)	Taling Chan ↔ Siriraj	2029

=== Rolling stock ===
Line	Class (family (Note: If applicable only))	Image	Manufacturer(s)	Manufactured in
Sukhumvit line Silom line	EMU-A1 (Modular Metro)		Siemens Mobility; SGP Verkehrstechnik	Austria; Germany
Sukhumvit line Silom line	EMU-A2		Siemens Mobility; Bozankaya	Turkey
Sukhumvit line Silom line	EMU-B1 and EMU-B2		CNR Changchun Railway Vehicles	China
Sukhumvit line Silom line	EMU-B3		CRRC Changchun Railway Vehicles	China
Blue Line	EMU-IBL (Modular Metro)		Siemens Mobility	Austria
Blue Line	EMU-BLE (Modular Metro)		Siemens Mobility	Austria; Germany
Airport Rail Link	Modified Class 360 (Desiro)		Siemens Mobility	Germany
Purple Line	S24-EMU (sustina)		Japan Transport Engineering Company	Japan
Dark Red Line	1000 series (AT100)		Hitachi Rail	Japan
Light Red Line	2000 series (AT100)		Hitachi Rail	Japan
Gold Line	INNOVIA APM 300		Bombardier Transportation; CRRC Nanjing Puzhen	China
Pink Line	INNOVIA Monorail 300		Bombardier Transportation; CRRC Nanjing Puzhen	China
Yellow Line	INNOVIA Monorail 300		Bombardier Transportation; CRRC Nanjing Puzhen	China

=== Ticketing and fare rates ===
==== MRT Blue line ====
There are many types of stored-value cards according to passenger age. An Adult card is equivalent to full fare. An Elder card for over-65s provides a 50% discount. A Student card for under-23s provides a 10% discount. A Child card for under-14s (and under 120 cm tall) provides a 50% discount.

The fare rates are counted by the number of stations, starting from 16 baht for a station, increasing by 2-3 baht for each station up to 42 baht for 17 stations.

==== MRT Purple line ====
This line uses the same stored-value cards as MRT Blue Line. Fares start from 15 baht for a station, increasing 1 baht for each station up to 29 baht for 15 stations.

For passengers without cards, fares start from 17 baht for a station, increasing 2-3 baht for each station, reaching the maximum values at 42 baht for 11 stations.

==== Airport Rail Link ====
For the city line, the fare rates start from 15 baht for a station, increase 5 baht for each station up to 45 baht for 7 stations.

==== BTS ====
BTS (not to be confused with the K-pop group) has its own stored value cards called "Rabbit card". There are 3 types of Rabbit card: adult, student, and senior, with 100 baht initial stored value.

BTS fare rates start from 16 baht. The costs is based on the distance travelled. Travelling between Wongwian Yai - Bang Wa stations, On-Nut - Bearing stations costs 15 baht. 15 baht will also be added when travelling between these stations to the other station on the main line.

== Inter-city and high-speed rail ==
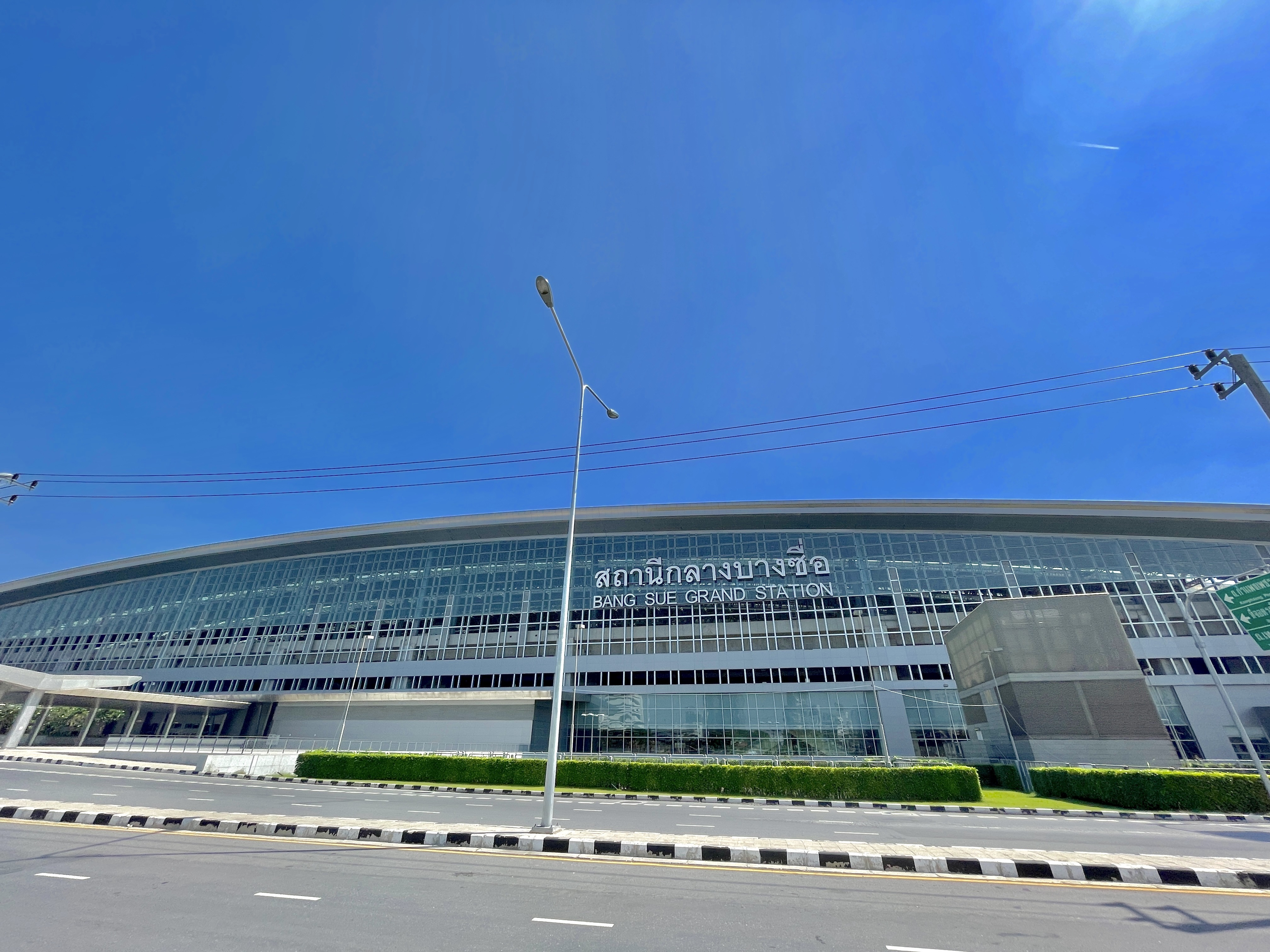
Krung Thep Aphiwat Central Terminal

Bangkok is the location of the Krung Thep Aphiwat Central Terminal, the central rail hub for most long-distance trains as of 2023, as well as the older Hua Lamphong station, both operated by the State Railway of Thailand (SRT). From Bangkok, trains travel on the Northern Line to Chiang Mai, the Northeastern Line to Nong Khai and Ubon Ratchathani, and the Eastern Line to Aranyaprathet, and the Southern Line, which terminates at Su-ngai Kolok and has a connection to Malaysia (the other Southern terminus is Thonburi).

=== Planned high-speed rail terminus ===
There are multiple planned high-speed rail lines in Thailand. The Bangkok–Nong Khai high-speed railway and Don Mueang–Suvarnabhumi–U-Tapao high-speed railway are under construction as of 2023. The Krung Thep Aphiwat Central Terminal will act as a future hub for all high-speed services.

== See also ==
- Rail transport in Thailand
- Rapid transit in Thailand
