= Bangkok Metro =

Bangkok Metro may refer to:

- MRT (Bangkok), one of the rapid transit systems serving Bangkok
- Bangkok Metro Public Company limited, the operator of the MRT, now part of Bangkok Expressway and Metro PCL
- Bangkok Metropolis, the city limits of Bangkok
- Bangkok Metropolitan Region, the city's wider urban agglomeration
- Bangkok Metropolitan Administration, the local government of Bangkok

== See also ==
- Rail transport in Bangkok
- Mass Rapid Transit Master Plan in Bangkok Metropolitan Region
