= Mangmoom card =

Transport smart card in Bangkok, Thailand

Mangmoom
- Location: Bangkok, Thailand
- Launched: 23 June 2018; 7 years ago
- Technology: Contactless smart card
- Manager: Ministry of Transport (Thailand)
- Currency: THB (100 THB minimum load, 5,000 THB maximum load)
- Validity: MRT Blue Line; MRT Purple Line; MRT Yellow Line; MRT Pink Line; MRT Orange Line; SRT Dark Red Line; SRT Light Red Line; SRT Airport Rail Link
- Retailed: MRT Blue Line ticket offices; MRT Purple Line ticket offices
- Variants: Adult card; Senior card; Student card

Mangmoom (แมงมุม, Thai for "spider") is a contactless smart card used in Bangkok, Thailand. It was originally planned to work as a single integrated ticket for all of the city's public transport systems. Whilst the first-generation card did not result in widespread use beyond the MRT Blue and Purple lines, the second-generation card can be used across the MRT Blue, Purple, Yellow, and Pink lines, as well as the SRT Light Red, Dark Red, and Airport Rail Link lines.

== History ==
Bangkok is primarily served by three rapid transit systems: the BTS Skytrain, the MRT Metro, and the State Railway of Thailand. Each system is owned and operated by a separate agency (sometimes multiple), which has resulted in commuters requiring different fare and ticket types to travel. Whilst Mangmoom was originally planned to work as a single integrated ticket, it is not yet a comprehensive ticketing system for all of the city's public transport systems.

== Mangmoom card (first generation) ==
The Mangmoom card was initially planned to launch in August 2016 but was delayed until at least 2018, as the Office of Transport and Traffic Policy and Planning (OTP) required more time to integrate the ticketing systems of the different rail networks. In November 2016, transport minister Arkhom Termpittayapaisith announced that the card would be available to use on the Skytrain, MRT, and Airport Rail Link by the middle of 2017.

In April 2017, it was announced that the Mass Rapid Transit Authority of Thailand (MRTA) would act as a central clearing house for the ticketing system, with the Airport Rail Link and some electric rail services joining by mid-2017, buses and the MRT Purple line joining by October 2017, and the Skytrain and MRT Blue Line joining later. In October 2017, an update was issued, stating that the card was again delayed, to mid-2018, and would only work with buses and the Airport Rail Link at launch.

In June 2018, it was announced that the card would finally launch on the 23rd of that month, with 200,000 units issued to the public, and would only work on the MRT Blue and Purple lines at launch, with the Airport Rail Link to be added by October. In September, it was announced that compatibility with the Airport Rail Link would be delayed until the end of the year, and BMTA buses would be delayed until March 2019. In May 2023, the Mangmoom card was replaced by the MRT EMV card.

== Mangmoom EMV card (second generation) ==
In August 2025, the Mangmoon EMV card was launched. It was developed in a partnership between Krungthai Bank and the MRTA. The card facilitates payments on the MRT Blue, Purple, Yellow, and Pink lines, as well as the SRT Light Red, Dark Red, and Airport Rail Link lines, but still not the BTS Sukhumvit Line, Silom Line, and Gold Line.

== Future ==
On 29 January 2024, the House of Representatives in principle unanimously approved the draft of the Joint Ticket Management Act, which would centralize the ticketing systems of boats, buses, trains, and electric trains under one platform. The act would allow commuters to use a single ticket to board different forms of public transport and reduce fares. The platform will be designed by the OTP. Additionally, the legislation would institute a 20-baht flat fare for all electric train routes. Deputy Minister of Transport Manaporn Charoensri said the ministry expected the draft to pass the house and senate, with an official announcement in the Royal Gazette expected by mid-2025. Subordinate legislation was set to be enacted by September 2025.

According to the OTP, integrated ticketing will be completed by 2027.

== See also ==
- Rabbit Card
- Electronic money
- List of smart cards
