= Rabbit Card =

Thai smart card

Rabbit Card บัตรแรบบิท
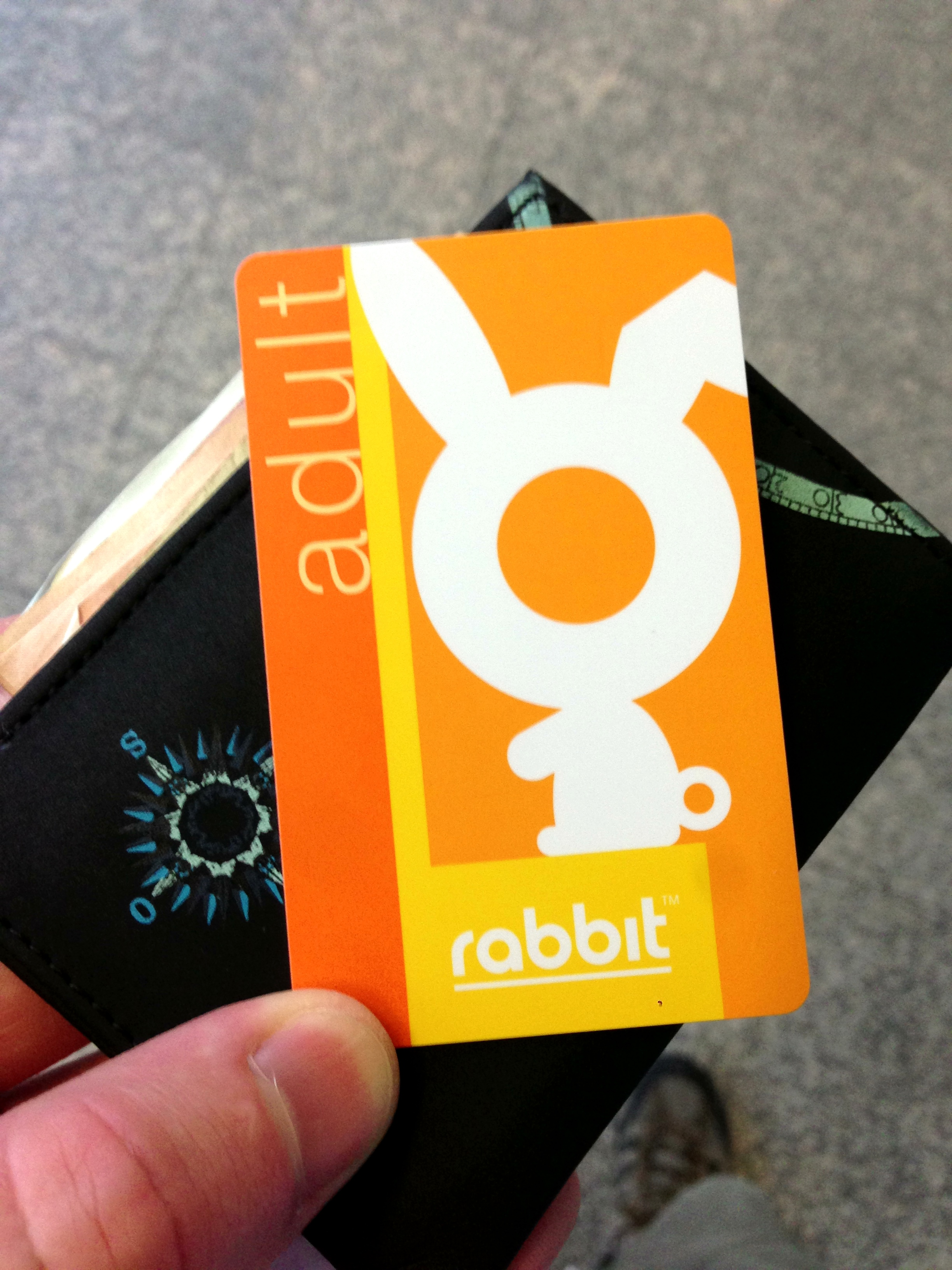
- Native name: บัตรแรบบิท
- Location: Bangkok, Thailand
- Launched: 1 May 2012
- Technology: MIFARE
- Manager: Bangkok Smartcard System (BSS)
- Currency: Thai baht (100 baht per top-up minimum load, 4,000 baht maximum load)
- Credit expiry: Two years after the last transaction; the card itself is valid for seven years
- Auto recharge: Automatic Add Value Service
- Validity: Bangkok BRT; BTS Skytrain; MRT Pink Line; MRT Yellow Line; Chao Phraya Express Boat; Gold Line

The Rabbit Card is a rechargeable contactless stored-value smart card used to pay public transport fares and to make electronic payments in Thailand. It is operated by Bangkok Smartcard System (BSS), a BTS Group company, and was launched on 1 May 2012 on the BTS Skytrain in Bangkok. The card is now also accepted on the Bangkok BRT, the MRT Yellow Line, the MRT Pink Line, the Gold Line and the Chao Phraya Express Boat. By the end of June 2025, 20.0 million Rabbit Cards had been issued.

Besides fares, the card can be used to buy goods and services at participating businesses. It is issued in standard, corporate, special and co-branded versions, with adult, student, senior and child types. The card uses MIFARE contactless technology and supports both stored-value and account-based ticketing, in which fares are paid from a linked Rabbit Wallet account. As an electronic money service, Rabbit requires cardholders to verify their identity. Since October 2026, users of supported Samsung smartphones have also been able to add a virtual Rabbit Card to Samsung Wallet.

== History and development ==
=== Launch and early development ===
Rabbit was developed by Bangkok Smartcard System (BSS), a company of the BTS Group, as a common ticket for public transport that could also be used for retail payments. In April 2012, The Nation reported that the card would first be accepted on the BTS Skytrain and at about 20 retail brands, with the Bangkok BRT and the MRT expected to follow later that year.

The card was launched on 1 May 2012. According to the BTS Group's annual report for 2012/13, more than one million cards were registered in the first year. In the same period, the card came to be accepted by more than 40 brands at about 700 retail branches, and the system was handling more than 400,000 transactions a day across the mass transit network and partner shops.

In 2016, BSS Holdings, a wholly owned subsidiary of BTS Group Holdings, bought a 50 per cent stake in Line Biz Plus, the company that operated the mobile payment service LINE Pay in Thailand, for 750 million baht, and the service was renamed Rabbit LINE Pay. At that time, more than five million Rabbit Cards had been issued, more than 4,000 card readers were in use in Bangkok and nearby areas, and the card was used for about 20 million journeys a month.

=== Digital expansion ===
Rabbit continued to grow in the 2020s. VGI, an affiliate of the BTS Group, reported that the number of Rabbit Cards issued had reached 20.0 million by the end of June 2025, an increase of 9.9 per cent from a year earlier. The same report described the development of Rabbit Wallet, an electronic wallet in the My Rabbit mobile application that can be linked to a Rabbit Card.

In October 2026, the Rabbit Virtual Card was made available in Samsung Wallet on all supported Galaxy smartphones. It works on the same rail, bus rapid transit and boat services as the physical card, including the Gold Line, and Samsung said that support for the Blue, Purple and Red lines, the Airport Rail Link and buses of the Bangkok Mass Transit Authority was planned by the end of 2026.

== Card usage ==
=== Public transportation ===
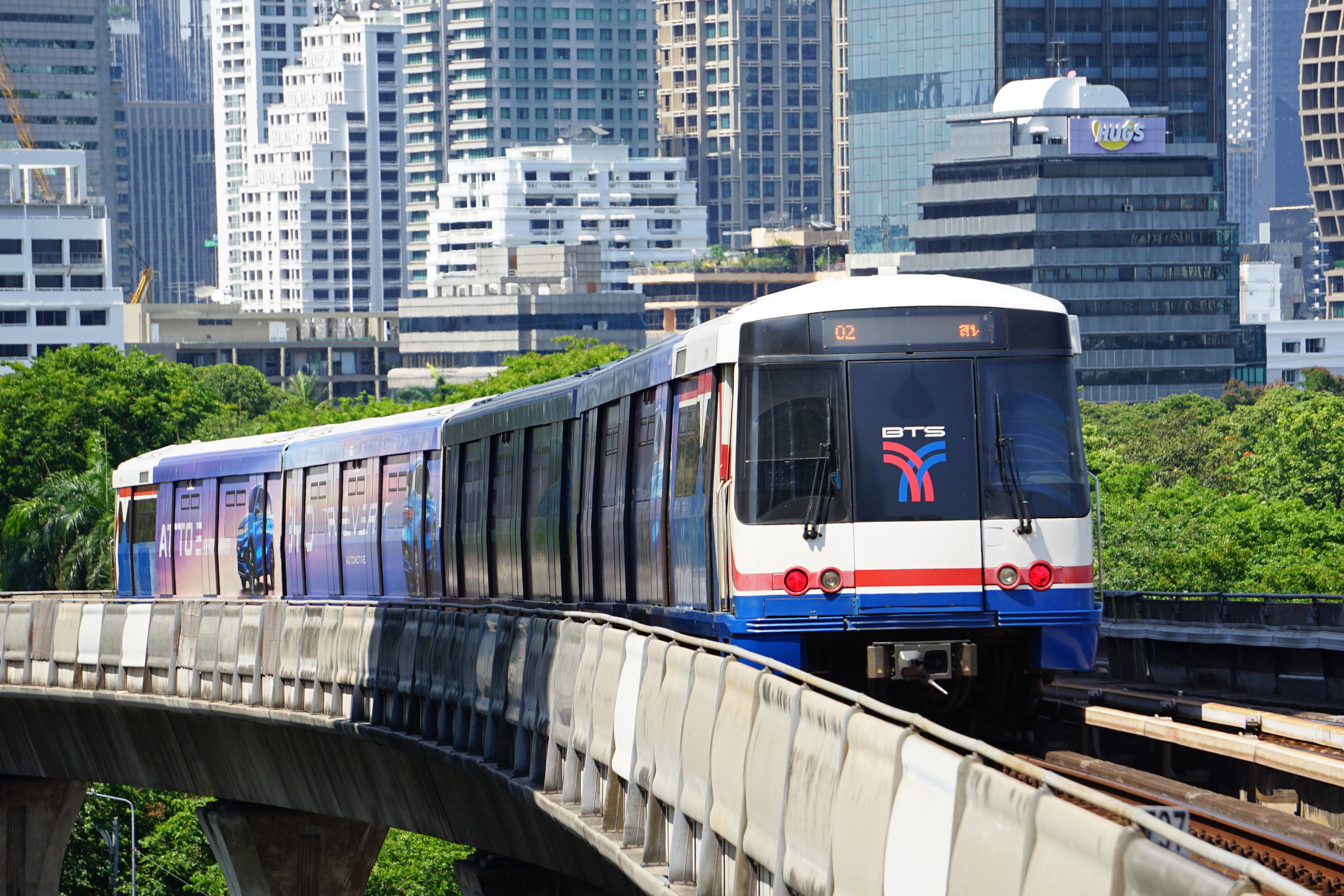
An EMU-A1 train on the BTS Skytrain, the first system to accept the Rabbit Card

The Rabbit Card is used to pay fares on several public transport systems in and around Bangkok. Rabbit lists the card as accepted on the BTS Skytrain, the MRT Yellow Line, the MRT Pink Line, the BRT and the Chao Phraya Express Boat. Fares and discounts are set by each operator. On the MRT Pink Line, for example, Thai citizens aged 60 or over pay half fare, and children no taller than 90 cm (35 in) travel free.

Rabbit is not the only fare medium in Bangkok. A report by the Office of Transport and Traffic Policy and Planning (OTP) of Thailand's Ministry of Transport identified several ticketing technologies used across the city's transport networks, including the card system used by Rabbit and contactless EMV bank cards. According to a 2025 report in the Bangkok Post, the Rabbit Card could be used on the Green, Gold, Pink and Yellow electric train lines, while EMV cards were accepted on lines including the Blue, Purple and Red lines and the Airport Rail Link, so some passengers might need two cards.

=== Retail and electronic payments ===
By late 2012, Rabbit could be used at partner convenience stores, supermarkets, restaurants and cinemas, and at other points of sale such as service stations and vending machines. Rabbit now describes the card as electronic money that can be used both for transport fares and for goods and services at participating businesses.

Rabbit has also formed partnerships with retailers. With the shopping-centre operator Siam Piwat, it launched the VIZ Rabbit card, which links the Rabbit Card to Siam Piwat's VIZ loyalty programme. Bangkok Smartcard System described the deal as Rabbit's first alliance with a leading retailer.

== Types of Rabbit cards ==
=== Standard and concession cards ===
Rabbit products are issued in several categories. The MRT Pink Line ticket conditions list four main categories, Standard, Corporate, Special and Co-Branded Rabbit, and each category can have Adult, Student, Senior and Child types.

The types on sale and their prices can differ between operators. Northern Bangkok Monorail, which runs the Pink Line, sells three types of Standard Rabbit: Adult, Student and Senior. A new card costs 200 baht, which includes a 120-baht issuing fee and 80 baht of stored value. On the BTS Skytrain, the issuing fee is 100 baht and no deposit is charged.

A Student Rabbit is for full-time students aged 23 or under, and a Senior Rabbit is for Thai citizens aged 60 or over. The ticket conditions also include a Child Rabbit for children aged 14 or under. Cardholders may be asked to show identification to prove that they are eligible.

=== Corporate, special and co-branded cards ===
A Corporate Rabbit is sold to another organisation, which then resells it to its own customers. A Special Rabbit is issued for a particular event or sold to an organisation, while a Co-Branded Rabbit is issued by an authorised partner and can combine Rabbit functions with the partner's own services.

== Technology and payment system ==
=== Contactless smart card technology ===
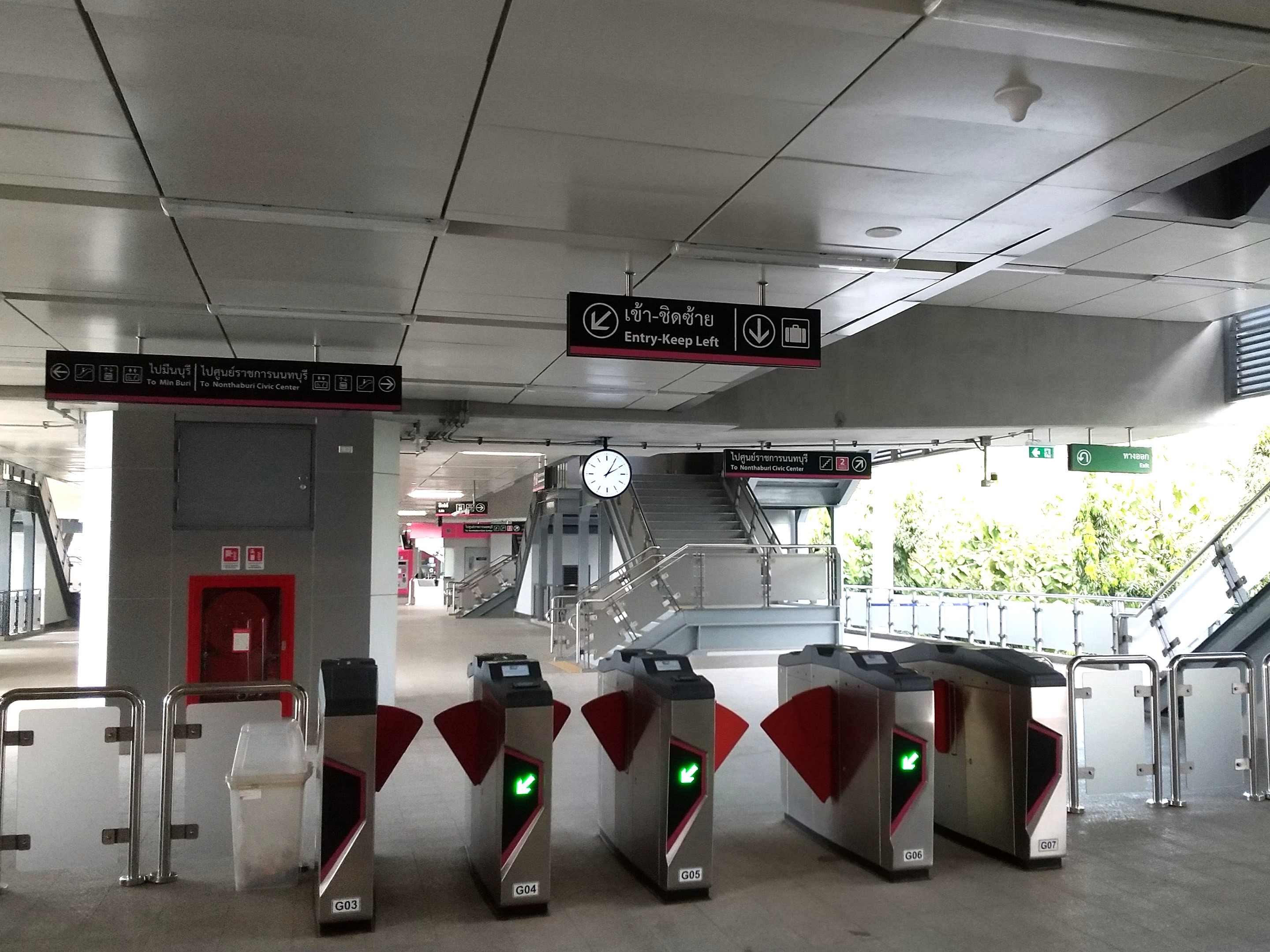
Fare gates at Royal Irrigation Department station on the MRT Pink Line

The Rabbit Card is a contactless smart card that uses MIFARE technology, a family of chips made by NXP Semiconductors. MIFARE cards communicate with card readers using the ISO/IEC 14443 Type A standard and have a typical reading distance of about 10 cm (3.9 in). Because the card exchanges data with the reader by radio, the holder only needs to bring it close to the reader rather than insert it into a machine. On the MRT Pink Line, for example, passengers place the card on the reader of an automatic fare gate when they enter and again when they leave, and the gate confirms each tap with a beep.

=== Fare collection and stored value ===
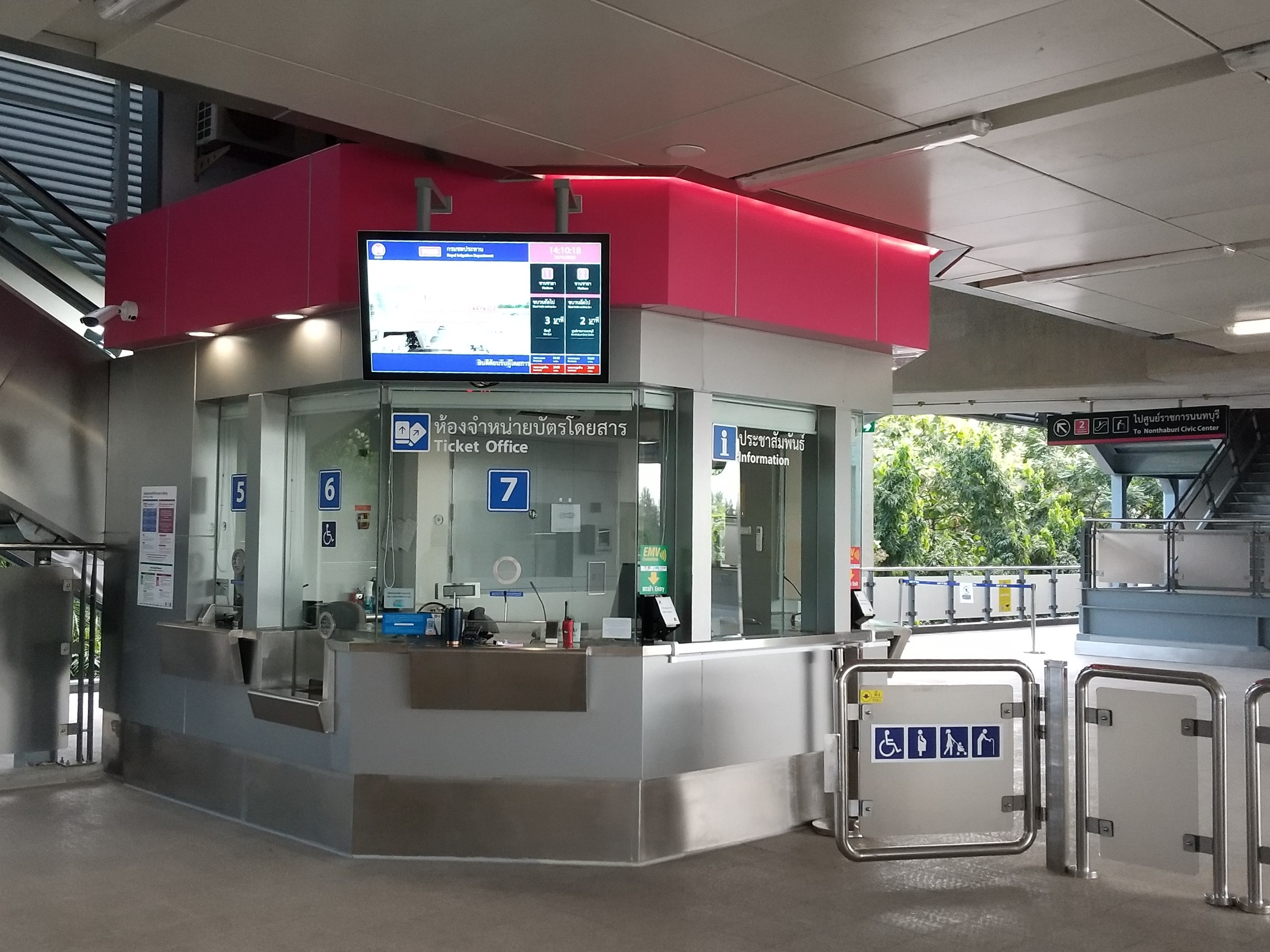
A ticket office at Royal Irrigation Department station on the MRT Pink Line, where Rabbit Cards can be bought and topped up

The Rabbit Card works as a stored-value card: money is loaded onto the card in advance, and the fare collection system deducts each fare from this balance according to the published fare table. On the MRT Pink Line, the fare is deducted automatically when the passenger leaves the destination station.

On the BTS Skytrain, at least 100 baht must be added at a time, and a card can hold up to 4,000 baht. Stored value remains valid for two years from the date of the last transaction, and the card itself can be used for seven years from the date it is issued. Adult and student cards can also hold 30-day trip packages for the BTS, but senior cards cannot.

Value can be added at ticket offices on the BTS Skytrain, the MRT Yellow and Pink lines and the BRT, at ticket vending machines in stations, and through other authorised top-up providers. It can also be added through the My Rabbit mobile application and LINE Pay.

=== Account-based ticketing and Rabbit Wallet ===
In addition to stored value, the Rabbit Card supports account-based ticketing (ABT). In an ABT system, the fare is charged to an account linked to the card rather than to a balance stored on the card itself. The OTP report lists the Rabbit Card as an ABT fare medium on several transport systems.

An existing card gains the ABT function when its holder links it to a Rabbit Wallet account in the My Rabbit application. Only cards that have passed identity verification can be linked, and each wallet can be linked to one card. To link a card, the user enters the card number in the app and then taps the card on a smartphone with near-field communication (NFC); users whose phones do not support NFC can complete this step at a ticket office. Ready-made Rabbit ABT cards are also sold at ticket offices on the BTS Green lines and the Pink, Yellow and Gold lines.

When an ABT card is used, fares on supported lines and payments at participating shops are deducted from the linked Rabbit Wallet instead of from a balance on the card. ABT is also needed for some government fare schemes. Only Rabbit Cards with the ABT function can be registered with Thang Rat, the Thai government's public service application, and the name on the card must match the name registered in the app. In 2025, the Bangkok Post reported that passengers who wanted to use the government's planned 20-baht flat fare on Bangkok's electric train lines would register through Thang Rat using either a contactless EMV bank card or a registered Rabbit Card.

=== Registration and identity verification ===
Each cardholder must complete know your customer (KYC) identity verification once, because Rabbit is an electronic money product. This can be done at BTS ticket offices, at the Rabbit Service Centre or through the My Rabbit application. In Thailand, providers of electronic money services need a licence or registration under the Payment Systems Act B.E. 2560 (2017), and they are supervised by the Bank of Thailand.

In January 2026, BTS issued a clarification after public discussion about restrictions affecting Rabbit Card users. It said that all cardholders must verify their KYC details and keep them up to date in order to comply with the law. Both Thai and foreign users can update their details at BTS ticket offices, although some may need further verification at the Rabbit Service Centre at Phaya Thai station.

== See also ==
- Mangmoom Card
- Octopus card
- List of smart cards
