= Charoen Nakhon station =

Railway station in Bangkok, Thailand

Charoen Nakhon เจริญนคร
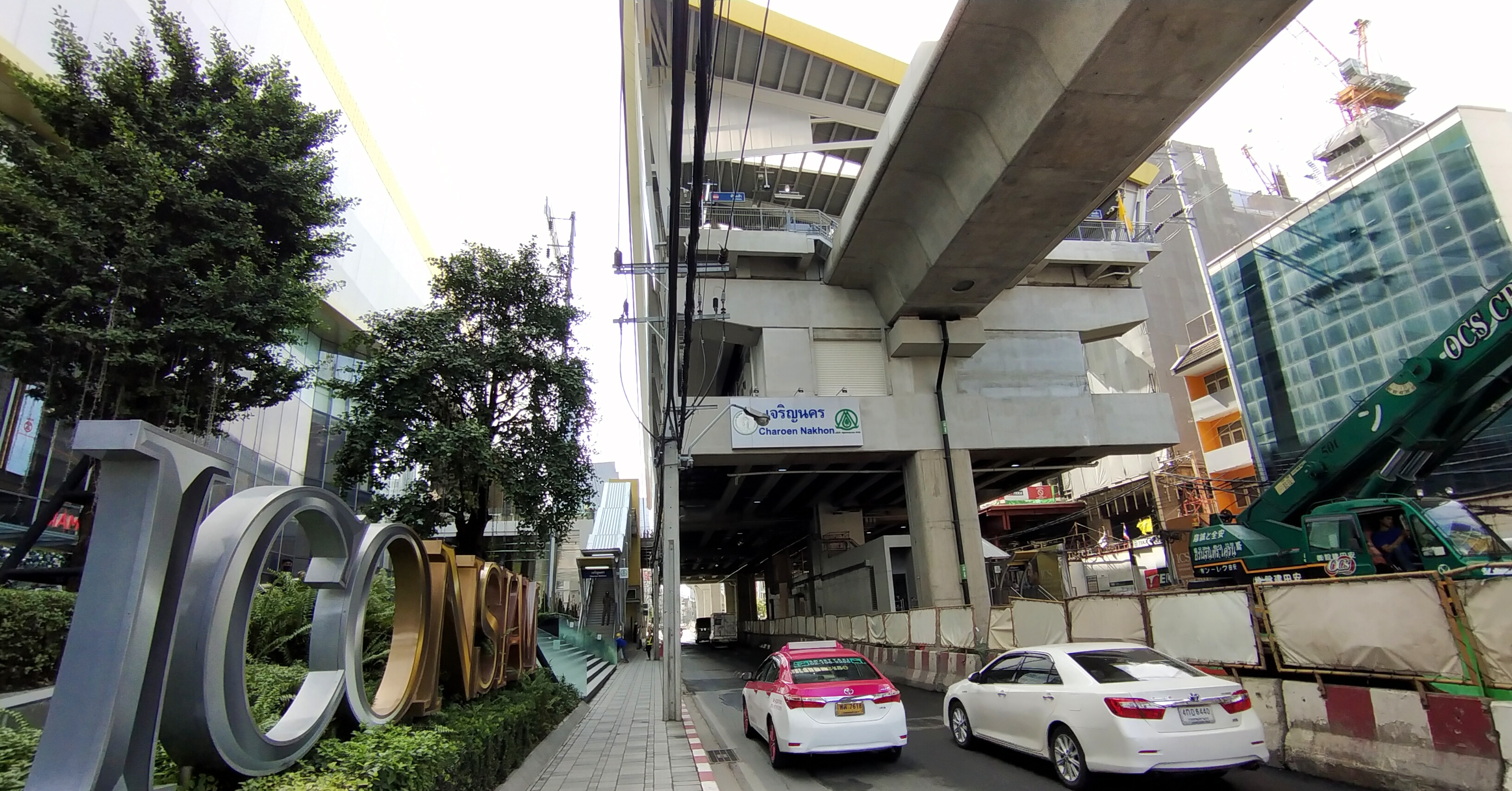

General information
- Location: Charoen Nakhon Road, Khlong San District; Bangkok; Thailand
- Coordinates: 13.7265°N 100.5090°E
- System: BTS
- Owner: Bangkok Metropolitan Administration (BMA)
- Operator: Krungthep Thanakom Company Limited (KT)
- Line: Gold Line
- Platforms: 2
- Tracks: 2

Construction
- Structure type: Elevated

Other information
- Station code: G2

History
- Opened: 16 December 2020; 5 years ago
- Electrified: 750 V DC Third rail

Services
Preceding station	BTS Skytrain	Following station
Khlong San Terminus	Gold Line	Krung Thon Buri Terminus
Location

Charoen Nakhon station (Thai: สถานีเจริญนคร) is a Gold Line station, located in Khlong San District, Bangkok, Thailand. The station opened on 16 December 2020. It is located on Charoen Nakhon Road, next to Iconsiam complex and Wat Suwan (th:วัดสุวรรณ (กรุงเทพมหานคร)).

== Station layout ==
U3
platform

Side platform, doors will open on the left
Platform 2
Gold Line toward Krung Thon Buri (Terminus) (peak)
Platform 1
Gold Line toward Khlong San (Terminus), Krung Thon Buri (Terminus) (off-peak)
Side platform, doors will open on the left
U2
ticket sales class

ticket sales floor
Exit 1-2, Passenger Service Center, Ticket Office, Ticket Machine
Iconsiam (Main Building and Extension Building)
G
Street level

-
Bus stop, Mitr Phol Business Administration Technological College, Millennium Hilton Hotel

Magnolias Waterfront Residences and The Residences at Mandarin Orient. Tel Bangkok Charoen Rat Road, Soi Charoen Nakhon 2, Soi Charoen Nakhon 3, Soi Charoen Nakhon 4, Soi Charoen Nakhon 5, Chao Phraya Express Boat, ICONSIAM

Platform 2 is not used during off-peak hours and Platform 1 handles trains going in both directions.

== Exits ==
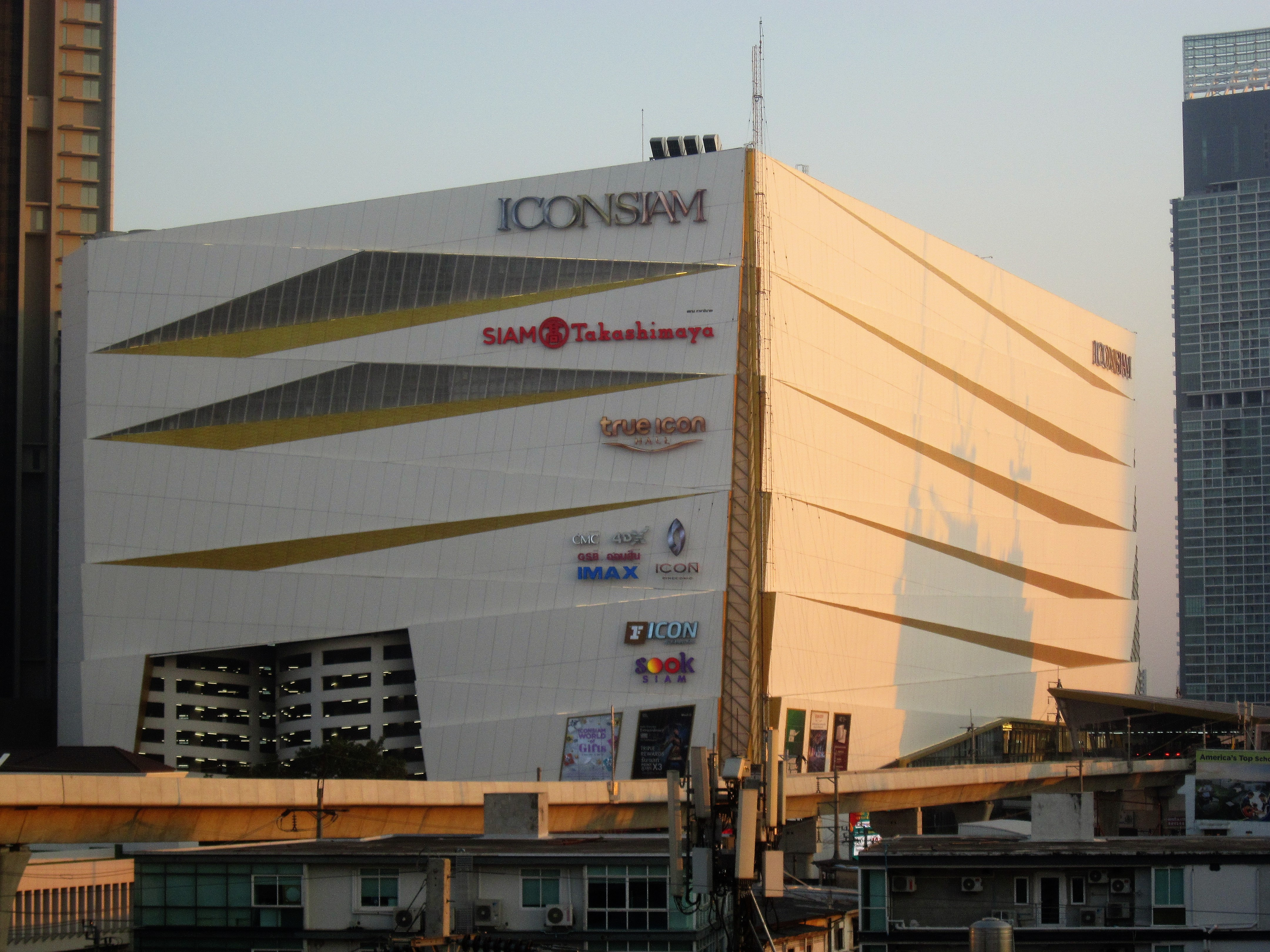
Iconsiam, one of the nearest landmark at Charoen Nakhon station.

- Exit 1: Iconsiam (ICS Building), Mitr Phol Business Administration Technology College, Soi Charoen Nakhon 2, Soi Charoen Nakhon 4
- Exit 2: Iconsiam (Bridge connecting through Charoen Nakhon Hall)
- Exit 3: Iconsiam (main building), Magnolias Waterfront Residences and The Residences at Mandarin Oriental, Bangkok, Millennium Hilton Bangkok Hotel, Soi Charoen Nakhon 3, Soi Charoen Nakhon 5

== Bus connections ==
BMTA

- 3: Mo Chit 2–Khlong San
- 6: Phra Pradaeng–Bang Lamphu (operated by Thai Smile Bus Co., Ltd.)
- 84: Wat Rai Khing–BTS Krung Thon Buri
- 88: KMUTT Bang Khun Thian–Lat Ya
- 105: Maha Chai Mueang Mai–Khlong San
- 111: Charoen Nakhon–Talat Phlu
- 120: Samut Sakhon–Ban Khaek Intersection (operated by Thai Smile Bus Co., Ltd.)
- 149: Phuttamonthon Sai 2–Ekkamai (operated by Krungthep Rotruam Borikan Co., Ltd.)
