= Joint Ticket Management Act =

Proposed law in Thailand

Parliament of Thailand
- Territorial extent: Thailand
- Considered by: House of Representatives; Senate of Thailand
- Signed by: Vajiralongkorn
- Signed: 27 December 2025
- Commenced: 28 December 2025

Legislative history
- First reading: 29 January 2025
- Second reading: 27 August 2025
- Third reading: 27 August 2025
- First reading: 8 September 2025
- Second reading: 21 October 2025
- Third reading: 21 October 2025
- Status: In force

The Joint Ticket Management Act (Thai: พระราชบัญญัติการบริหารจัดการระบบตั๋วร่วม; RTGS: Phra Ratchabanyat Kan Borihan Chatkan Rabop Tua Ruam), also known as the Common Ticket System Management Act, is a Thai law to consolidate ticketing systems for public transit in the Bangkok Metropolitan Region, including trains, electric trains, buses, and boats.

== Background ==
Bangkok has an amalgamation of public transit systems owned and operated by various government entities and companies. These include:

- BTS Skytrain, Bangkok BRT, and Gold Line—operated by Bangkok Mass Transit System PCL
- MRT Purple and Blue lines—operated by Bangkok Expressway and Metro
- MRT Yellow and Pink lines—operated by Eastern Bangkok Monorail Company Limited and Northern Bangkok Monorail Company Limited (Subsidiary of BSR Consortium)
- Airport Rail Link—operated by Asia Era One Company Limited
- Commuter rail (Northern, Northeastern, Southern, and Eastern Lines) and Maeklong Railway—operated by State Railway of Thailand
- Buses—operated by Bangkok Mass Transit Authority (BMTA)

As a result, each system uses different payment methods. Previous efforts to introduce a common transit payment system include the Mangmoom (Spider) Card.

In September 2022, the Office of Transport and Traffic Policy and Planning (OTP) proposed a Joint Ticket Act.

== Legislative history ==
=== House of Representatives ===
On 29 January 2025, the House of Representatives unanimously approved in principle the draft Joint Ticket Management Act. A special committee to oversee the bill will be established. Deputy Minister of Transport Manaporn Charoensri expects the enactment of the Act to begin in the middle of 2025. The meeting then resolved to approve the draft that the special committee had already considered.

=== Senate ===
The Senate unanimously approved the Joint Ticket Management Bill in its first reading, and a special committee was established to consider the bill. After that, the meeting agreed to approve the bill that the Special Committee had finished reviewing.

=== Announcement ===
On the December 27, 2025, the Royal Gazette published the Joint Ticket Management Act, which came into effect the following day, December 28, 2025.

== Provisions ==
The Act will centralize ticketing systems for Bangkok's mass transit under one platform designed by the Office of Transport and Traffic Policy and Planning. This will commuters allow to board different systems using one ticket, and reduce fares. A key policy position of the ruling Pheu Thai Party, the Act will implement a 20 Baht flat fee for electric train routes. The act will establish a Joint Ticket Promotion Fund to compensate private operators for lost revenue.

== See also ==
- Transport in Bangkok
- Mangmoom Card
