= Khlong San station =

Rapid transit station in Thailand

Khlong San คลองสาน
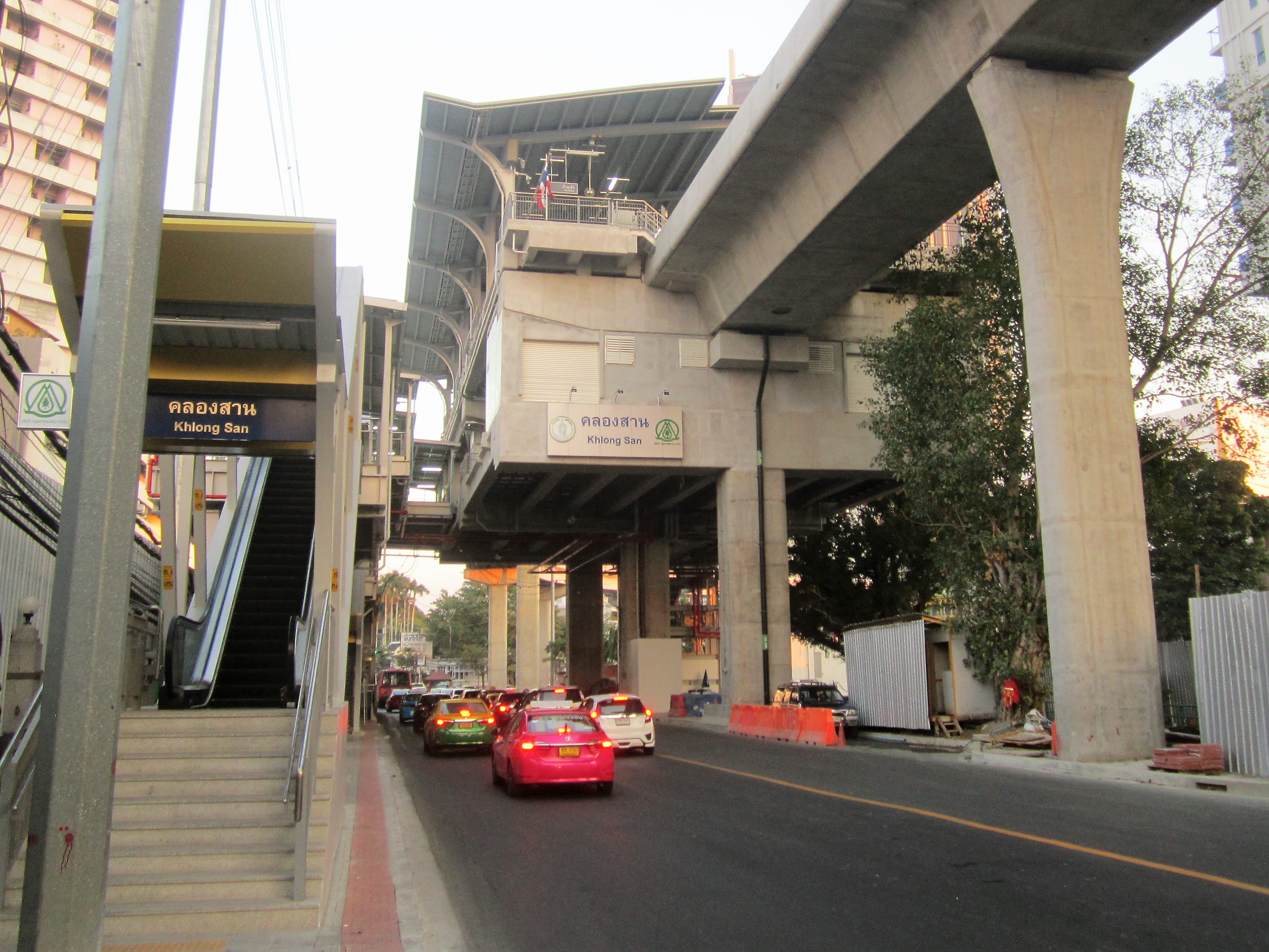

General information
- Location: Khlong San District; Bangkok; Thailand
- Coordinates: 13.7304°N 100.5076°E
- System: BTS
- Owner: Bangkok Metropolitan Administration (BMA)
- Operator: Krungthep Thanakom Company Limited (KT)
- Line: Gold Line
- Platforms: 2
- Tracks: 2

Construction
- Structure type: Elevated

History
- Opened: 16 December 2020; 5 years ago

Services
Preceding station	BTS Skytrain	Following station
Terminus	Gold Line	Charoen Nakhon towards Krung Thon Buri
Location

Khlong San station (Thai: สถานีคลองสาน, pronounced [sā.tʰǎː.nīː kʰlɔ̄ːŋ sǎːn]) is a Gold Line station, located in Khlong San District, Bangkok, Thailand. The station is on Somdet Chao Phraya Road, in front of Taksin Hospital. It opened on 16 December 2020.

== Station layout ==
U3 platform
U3 platform	Side platform, doors will open on the left
U3 platform	Platform 2	Gold Line toward Krung Thon Buri (Charoen Nakhon)
U3 platform	Platform 1	Gold Line termination platform (unused)
U3 platform	Side platform, doors will open on the left
U2 ticket sales class	ticket sales floor	Exit 1–3, Passenger Service Center, Ticket Office, Ticket Machine
G Street level	-	Bus stop, Taksin Hospital, Khlong San District Office

== See also ==
- Gold Line (Bangkok)
