= Krung Thon Buri BTS station =

Skytrain station in Khlong San District, Bangkok

Krung Thon Buri กรุงธนบุรี
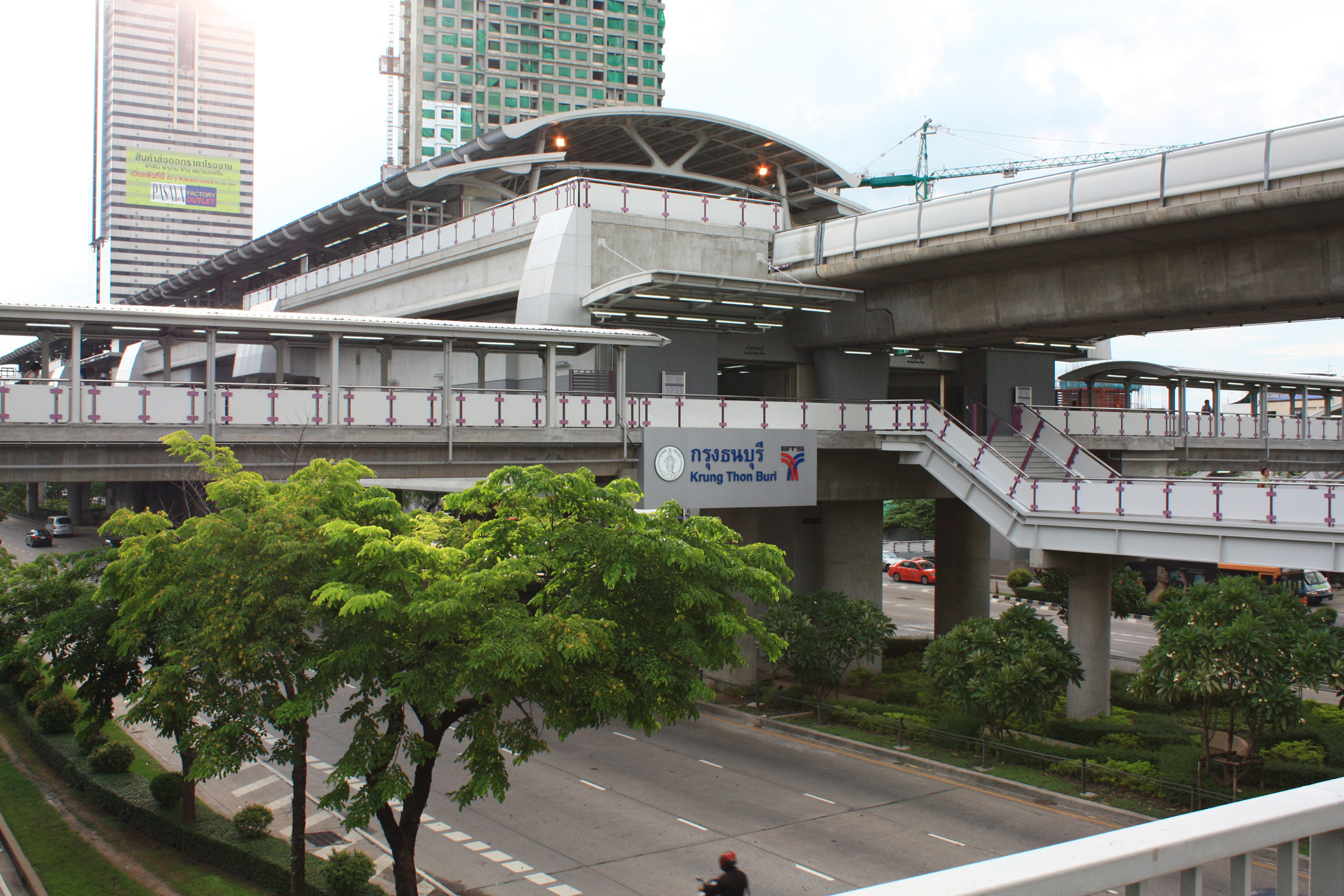

General information
- Location: Khlong San District; Bangkok; Thailand
- Coordinates: 13°43′15″N 100°30′10″E
- Owner: Bangkok Metropolitan Administration (BMA)
- Operator: Bangkok Mass Transit System; Public Company Limited (BTSC); Krungthep Thanakom Company Limited (KT) (Gold Line)
- Lines: Silom Line; Gold Line

Other information
- Station code: S7 (Silom line); G1 (Gold line)

History
- Opened: 15 May 2009; 17 years ago (Silom Line); 16 December 2020; 5 years ago (Gold Line)
- Former names: Charoen Nakhon

Passengers
- 2021: 1,427,802

Services
Preceding station	BTS Skytrain	Following station
Saphan Taksin towards National Stadium	Silom Line	Wongwian Yai towards Bang Wa
Charoen Nakhon towards Khlong San	Gold Line	Terminus
Location

Krung Thon Buri station (Thai: สถานีกรุงธนบุรี, pronounced [sā.tʰǎː.nīː krūŋ tʰōn bū.rīː]}) is an interchange station of BTS Skytrain's Silom Line and Gold Line in Khlong San District, Bangkok, Thailand. The station is on Krung Thon Buri Road. It was the first station of Bangkok's rapid transit system in Thonburi (The west bank of Chao Phraya River).

The Silom Line station opened on 15 May 2009, together with Wongwian Yai station on the 2.2 km (1.4 mi) Skytrain extension.

The Gold Line station opened on 16 December 2020, together with Charoen Nakhon station and Khlong San station, the only two other stations of the line.

== Station layout ==
U3; Platform	Platform 1	Gold Line toward Khlong San (Charoen Nakhon)
U3; Platform	Island platform, doors will open on the left/right
U3; Platform	Platform 2	Gold Line toward Khlong San (Charoen Nakhon)
U3; Platform	Side platform, doors will open on the right
U3; Platform	Platform 3	Silom Line toward Bang Wa (Wongwian Yai)
U3; Platform	Platform 4	Silom Line toward National Stadium (Saphan Taksin)
U3; Platform	Side platform, doors will open on the right
U2 ticket sales class	ticket sales floor	Exit 1–4, Passenger Service Center; Ticket Office, Ticket Machine, Shop; Footbridge to Gold Line
G Street level	-	Bus Stop

== Gallery ==
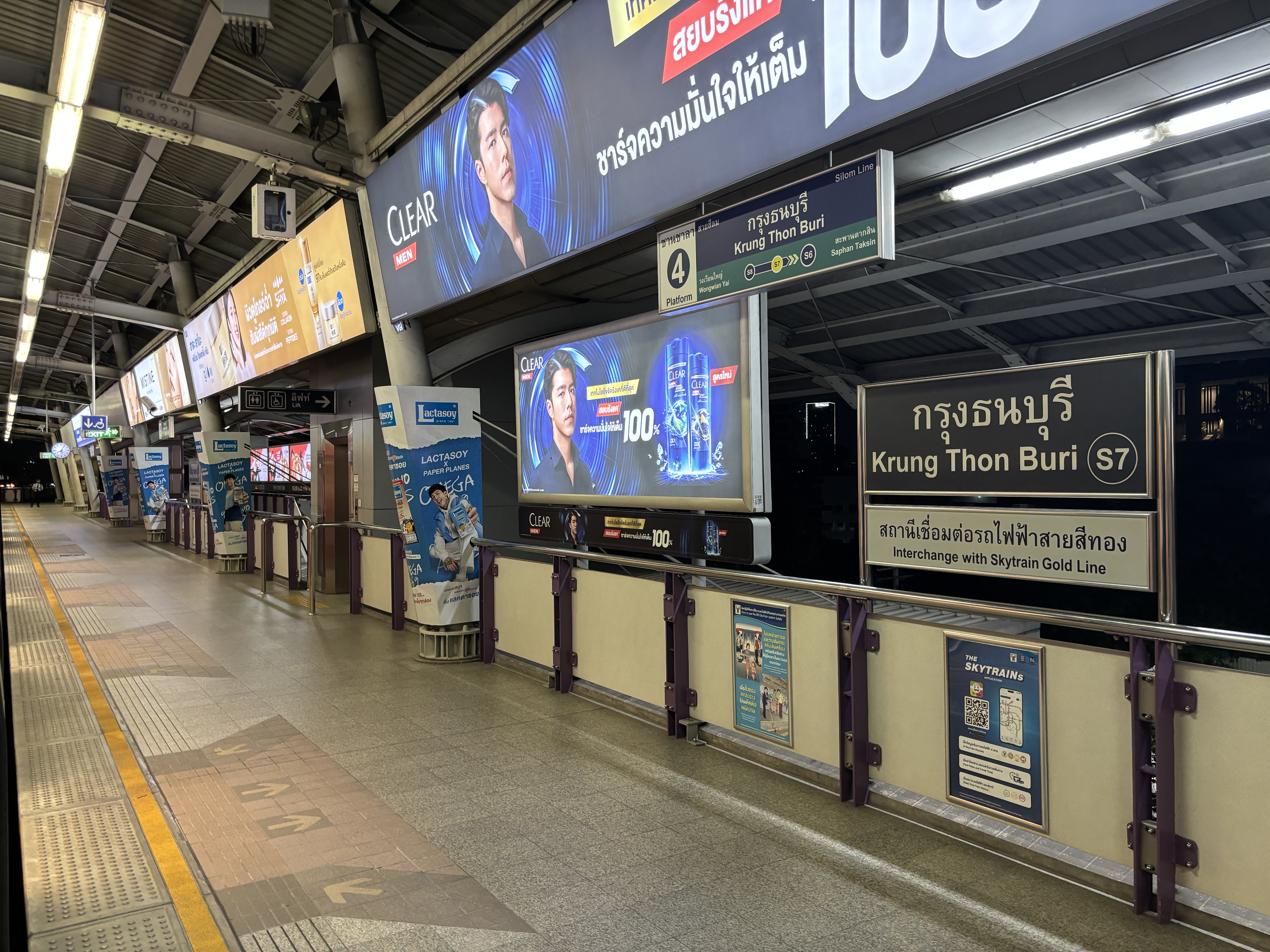
Platform of Silom Line

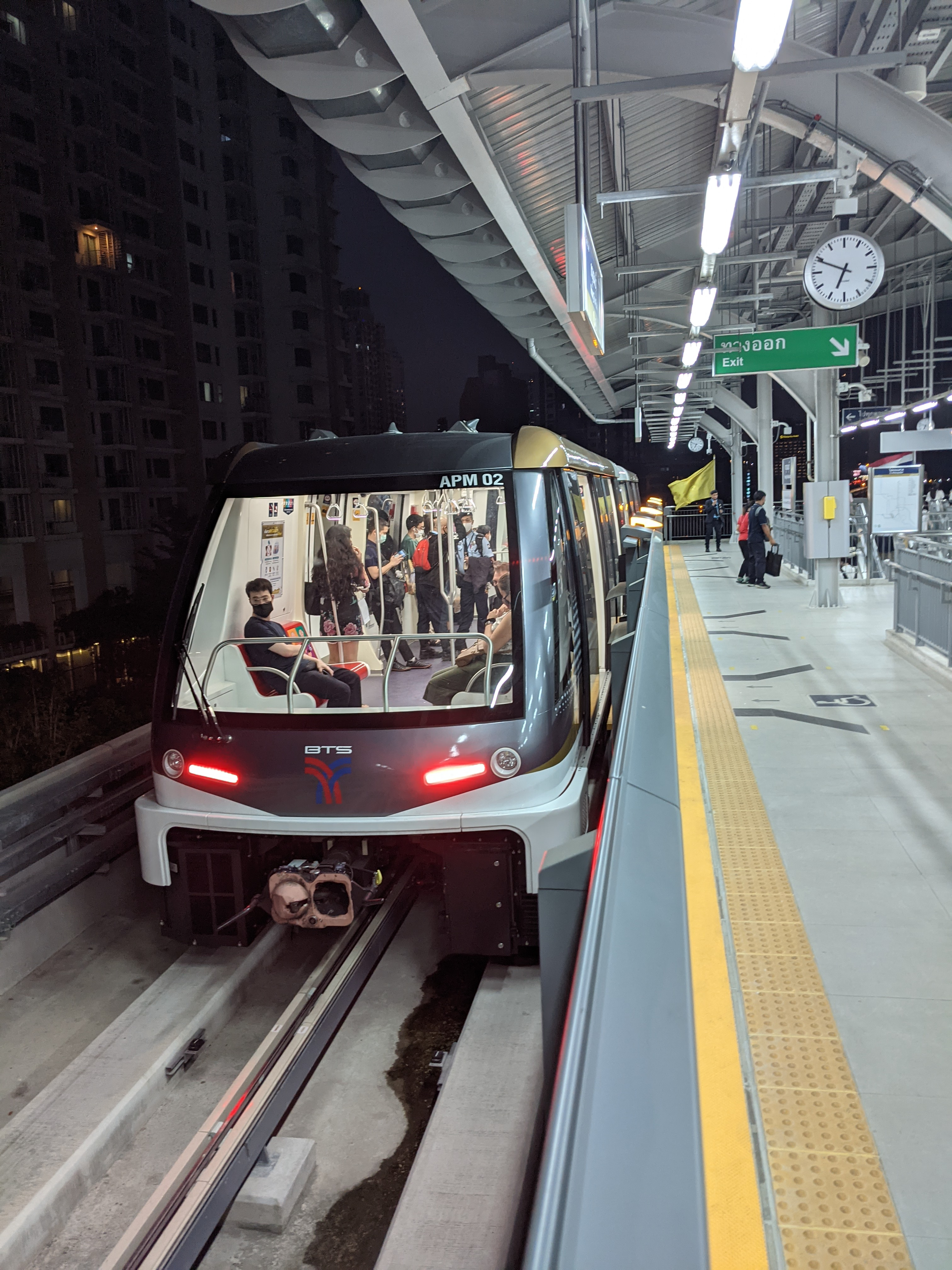
A Gold Line train at Krung Thon Buri station

Krung Thon Buri Station Traditional sign (BTS)

Krung Thon Buri Station Traditional sign (Gold line)

== See also ==
- Bangkok Skytrain
