= Gold Line (Bangkok) =

Automated People Mover (APM) line in Thailand

Gold Line สายสีทอง

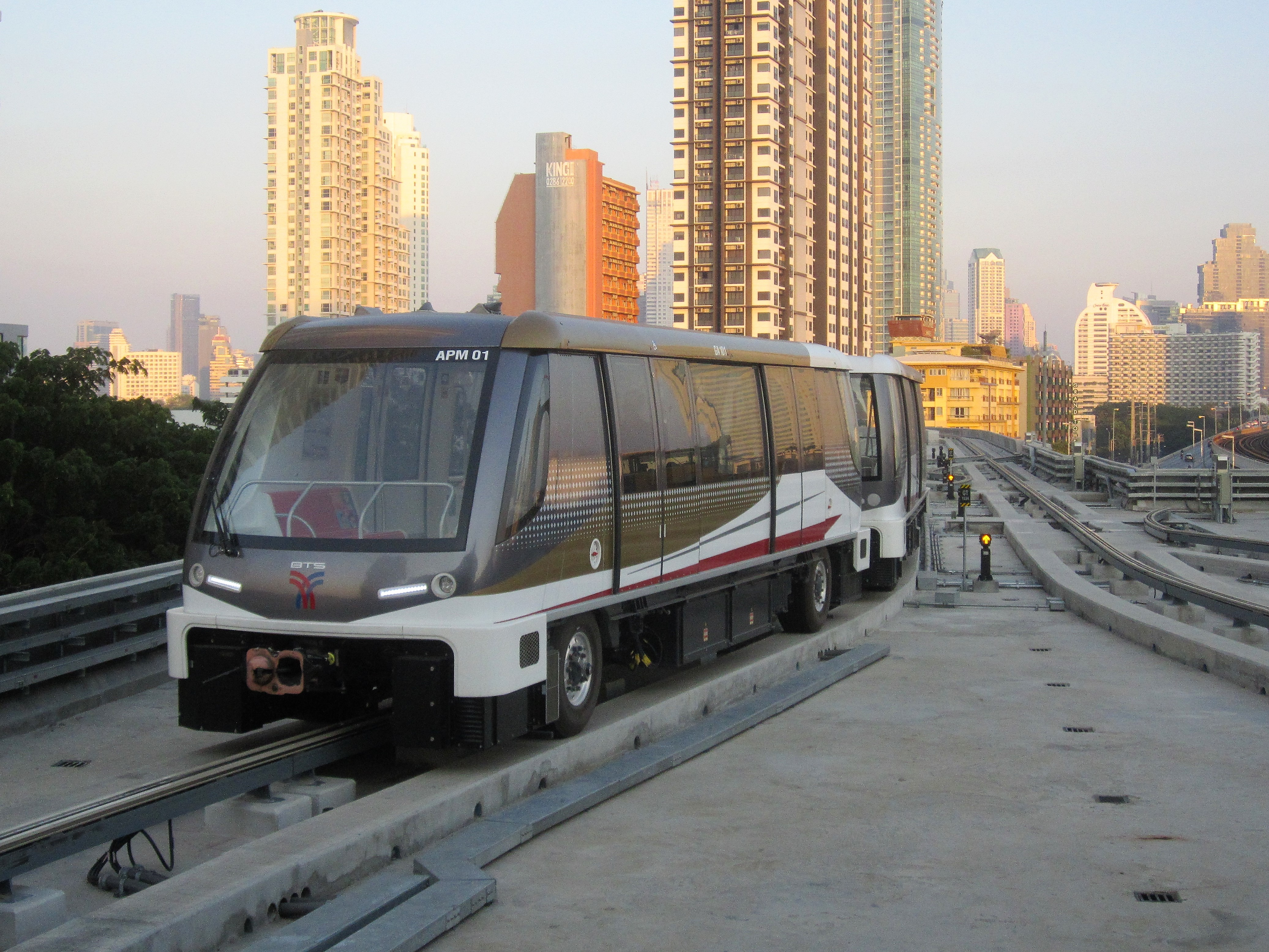
- Alstom Innovia APM 300 vehicle at Krung Thonburi station in 2021

Overview
- Status: Operating
- Owner: Bangkok Metropolitan Administration
- Locale: Bangkok, Thailand
- Termini: Krung Thon Buri; Khlong San
- Stations: 3

Service
- Type: People mover (AGT)
- Operator(s): Krungthep Thanakom Company Limited; Bangkok Mass Transit System
- Rolling stock: Bombardier Innovia APM 300

History
- Opened: 16 December 2020; 5 years ago

Technical
- Line length: 1.8 kilometers (1.1 mi) (est.)
- Num of tracks: 2
- Character: Elevated
- Electrification: 750 V DC third rail
- Operating speed: 80 km/h (50 mph)
- Signalling: Bombardier CITYFLO 650 moving block CBTC ATC under ATO GoA 3 (DTO), with subsystems of ATP, ATS and CBI

The Gold Line is an automated people mover line, part of Bangkok's rapid transit system. The line is 1.8 km (1.1 mi) long, consisting of 3 stations, and was opened by Thai Prime Minister Prayut Chan-o-cha on 16 December 2020. It primarily serves as a feeder line between the BTS Silom line and Iconsiam shopping center. The line will be extended 1 km (0.62 mi) along Somdet Chao Phraya road to connect with the future MRT Purple Line southern extension. When completed, it will connect Krung Thon Buri BTS station with Prajadhipok Road in Thon Buri District for a total distance of 2.68 km (1.67 mi).

The Gold Line is operated by Bangkok Mass Transit System Public Company Limited (BTSC) under a 30-year contract. BTSC also operates the BTS Skytrain. As of the 1 January 2026 fare revision, a flat fare of 17 baht is charged. Tickets can only be purchased for stations within the line.

== History ==
The line was not part of the first M-Map Master Plan as the line was proposed by the owners of Iconsiam mall in July 2015 to provide a feeder service to Iconsiam. The project was approved by the Thai Cabinet in September 2016 with an initial planned opening of late 2018. Preliminary works began in June 2018 with major construction commencing in September 2018.

Design and development of the line was the responsibility of Krungthep Thanakom PCL, an enterprise of the Bangkok Metropolitan Administration. The project budget of 3.8 billion Thai baht was fully funded by the proponent of the project, shopping mall company Siam Piwat who has responsibility for all construction costs. All advertising revenue and operating profits will be collected by Siam Piwat Company during the 30 year concession period.

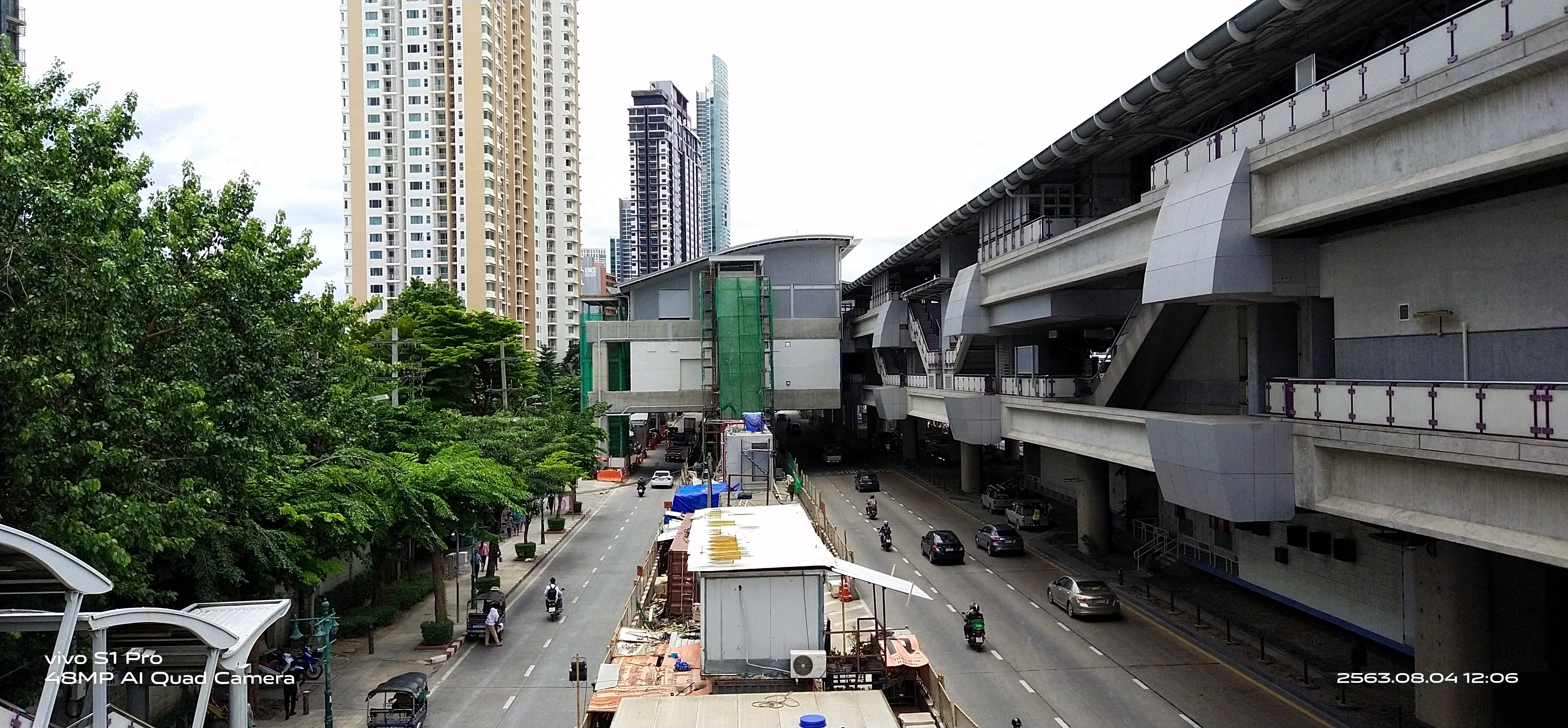
Gold Line's Krung Thon Buri station under construction in August 2020

At the end of August 2020, overall work for the Gold Line was 95% complete. The line was due to open on 1 October 2020 and initial test runs began on 11 September. However, further test runs revealed that additional tests would be required of the signaling and operational systems before full operations could start. The President of the BTSC stated that a further two months of tests were required and that the line would not open until December 2020. In early December, an opening date of 16 December 2020 was announced. Upon opening, a one-month free travel period was in effect until 15 January 2021.

=== Extension ===
==== Prajadhipok Extension ====
The line will then be further extended 0.95 km (0.59 mi) west along Somdet Chao Phraya road and terminate at Prajadhipok station to connect with the MRT Purple Line southern extension, which is scheduled to open in 2027.

== Services ==
Gold Line trains operate from 06:00 to 00:00 with a frequency range of 15 to 20-minute intervals.

During the free fare period for the first month of operations in January 2021, the line was averaging between 5,000 and 6,000 daily passengers with 3,000 using Iconsiam station.

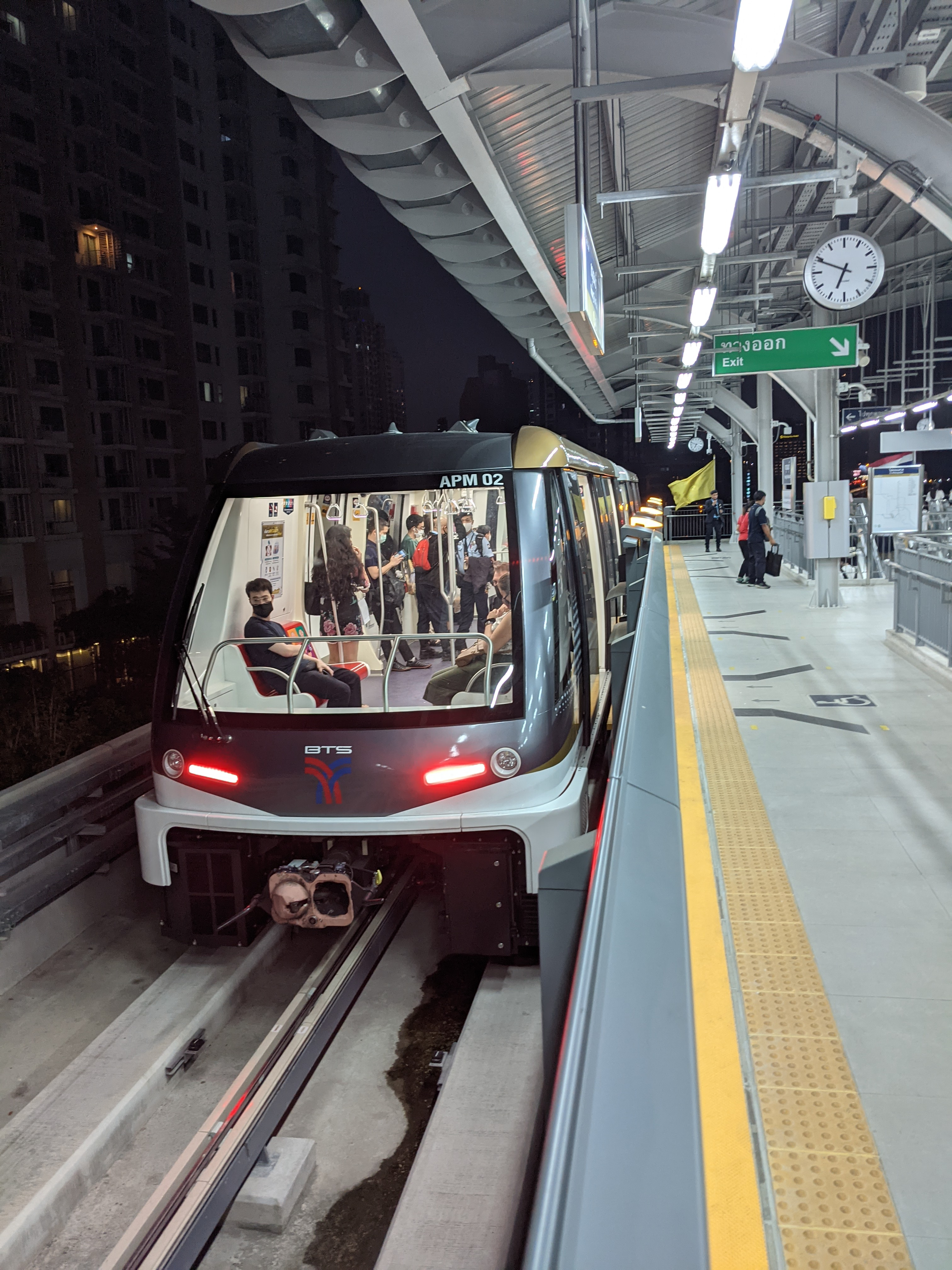
Alstom Innovia APM 300 vehicle at Krung Thon Buri station

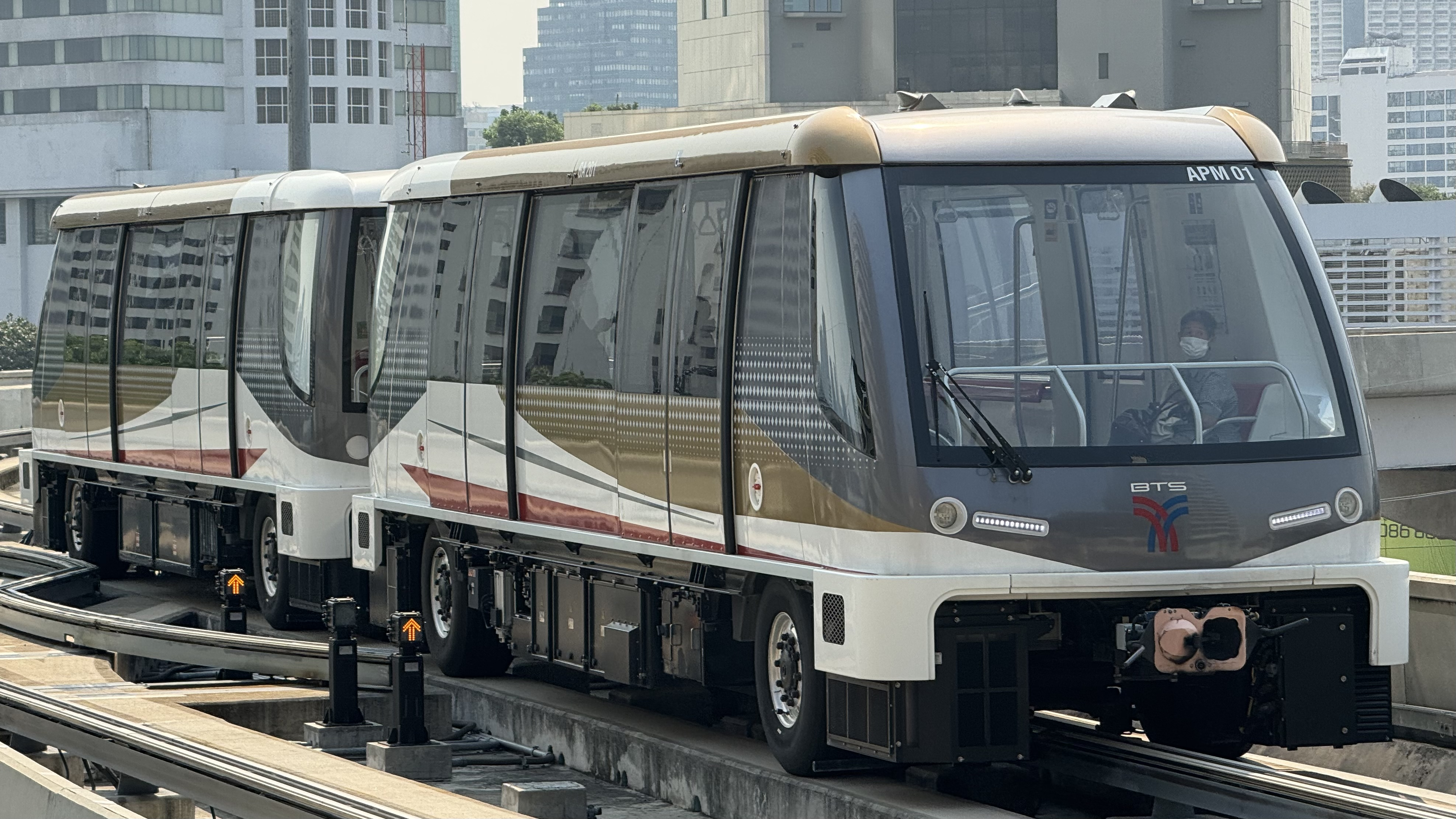
Alstom Innovia APM 300 vehicle approaching Khlong San station

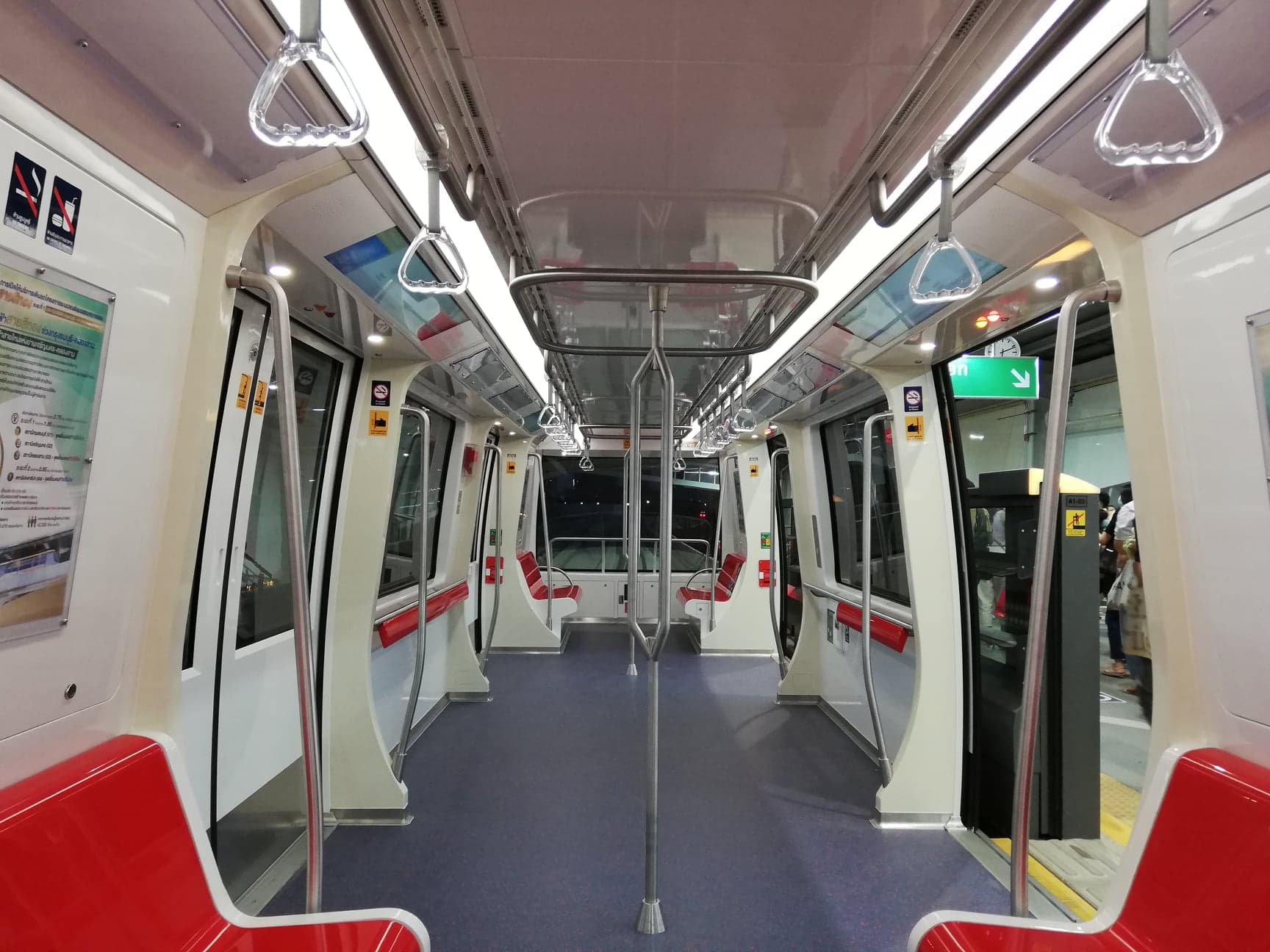
Interior of Gold Line Alstom Innovia APM 300

== Stations ==
Code	Station Name		Image	Opened	Platform type	Transfer	Notes
Code	English	Thai	Image	Opened	Platform type	Transfer	Notes
	Krung Thon Buri	กรุงธนบุรี		16 December 2020; 5 years ago	Island	Connecting station to BTS	Exit to: • International Pioneers School • Thong Pleng Temple • ERGO Tower
	Charoen Nakhon	เจริญนคร		16 December 2020; 5 years ago	Side		Exit to: • Iconsiam • Wat Suwan (th:วัดสุวรรณ (กรุงเทพมหานคร)) • Wat Suwan School
	Khlong San	คลองสาน		16 December 2020; 5 years ago	Side	Connecting station to SRT (future)	Exit to: • Taksin Hospital • Somdet Chao Phraya Hospital • Thong Noppakhun Temple • Pong Patchamit Fort

== Operation ==
Gold Line trains operate from 06:00 to 00:00 with a frequency range of six to twelve-minute intervals. During the free fare period for the first month of operations in January 2021, the line was averaging between 5,000 and 6,000 daily passengers with 3,000 using Iconsiam station.

From 25 January to 31 January 2025, Prime Minister Paetongtarn Shinawatra implemented a policy of free public transportation in Bangkok for one week. This measure aims to address the worsening air pollution caused by surging dust levels across all districts of the capital.

=== Headways ===
Gold Line Headway
Time	Section	Headway (Minutes:Seconds)
Monday - Friday
06.00 - 07.00	Krung Thon Buri - Khlong San	15:00
16:00 - 21:00	Krung Thon Buri - Khlong San	10:00
21:00 - 22:00	Krung Thon Buri - Khlong San	08:00
22:00 - 24:00	Krung Thon Buri - Khlong San	15:00
Saturday to Sunday and Public Holiday
06:00 - 10:00	Krung Thon Buri - Khlong San	15:00
10:00 - 15:00	Krung Thon Buri - Khlong San	10:00
22:00 - 23:00	Krung Thon Buri - Khlong San	08:00
22:00 - 24:00	Krung Thon Buri - Khlong San	15:00

=== Ridership ===
Gold Line Ridership
Year	Quarter	Quarterly Ridership	Daily Ridership	Annual Ridership	Remarks
2020	Q1			N/A	
2020	Q2			N/A	
2020	Q3			N/A	
2020	Q4	N/A		N/A	Krung Thon Buri - Khlong San section opened on 16 December 2020 2nd wave of COVID-19 outbreaks (December 2020 - February 2021)
2021	Q1	N/A	2,498	N/A	Krung Thon Buri - Khlong San section opened on 16 December 2020 2nd wave of COVID-19 outbreaks (December 2020 - February 2021)
2021	Q2	N/A	1,302	N/A	3rd wave of COVID-19 outbreaks (April 2021 - June 2021)
2021	Q3	N/A	726	N/A	4th wave of COVID-19 outbreaks (July 2021 - early 2022)
2021	Q4	N/A	2,248	N/A	4th wave of COVID-19 outbreaks (July 2021 - early 2022)
2022	Q1	162,794	1,809	1,243,319	4th wave of COVID-19 outbreaks (July 2021 - early 2022)
2022	Q2	160,859	1,768	1,243,319	4th wave of COVID-19 outbreaks (July 2021 - early 2022)
2022	Q3	369,543	4,017	1,243,319	
2022	Q4	550,123	5,980	1,243,319	
2023	Q1	496,438	5,516	2,456,776	
2023	Q2	567,282	6,234	2,456,776	
2023	Q3	670,473	7,288	2,456,776	
2023	Q4	722,583	7,855	2,456,776	
2024	Q1	621,059	6,825	2,771,075	
2024	Q2	619,707	6,810	2,771,075	
2024	Q3	718,388	7,809	2,771,075	
2024	Q4	811,921	8,826	2,771,075	
2025	Q1	696,490	7,739	2,723,058	Free public transportation policy was implemented between 25 and 31 January 2025. Train services were temporarily suspended due to 2025 Myanmar Earthquake on 28 March 2025.
2025	Q2	586,606	6,447	2,723,058	
2025	Q3	668,127	7,263	2,723,058	
2025	Q4	771,835	8,390	2,723,058	As of December 2025.
2026	Q1	678,400	7,538	2,001,640	
2026	Q2	613,459	6,741	2,001,640	
2026	Q3	709,781	7,715	2,001,640	As of September 2026
2026	Q4			2,001,640	

== Rolling stock ==
The Gold Line uses Alstom Innovia APM 300 automated people movers with rubber tyres manufactured by CRRC Puzhen Bombardier Transportation Systems (joint venture of Bombardier Transportation and CRRC Nanjing Puzhen) in Wuhu, Anhui, China. Innovia APMs are commonly used at airports to transport passengers between terminals. Each set has two carriages with 138 passenger capacity in each carriage, and can travel at a maximum of 80 km/h (50 mph). The first set was due to be delivered in April 2020, but was delayed due to a COVID-19 related lockdown in Anhui province.

The first set later arrived in Thailand on 18 June 2020, the remaining 2 sets were delivered in August 2020.

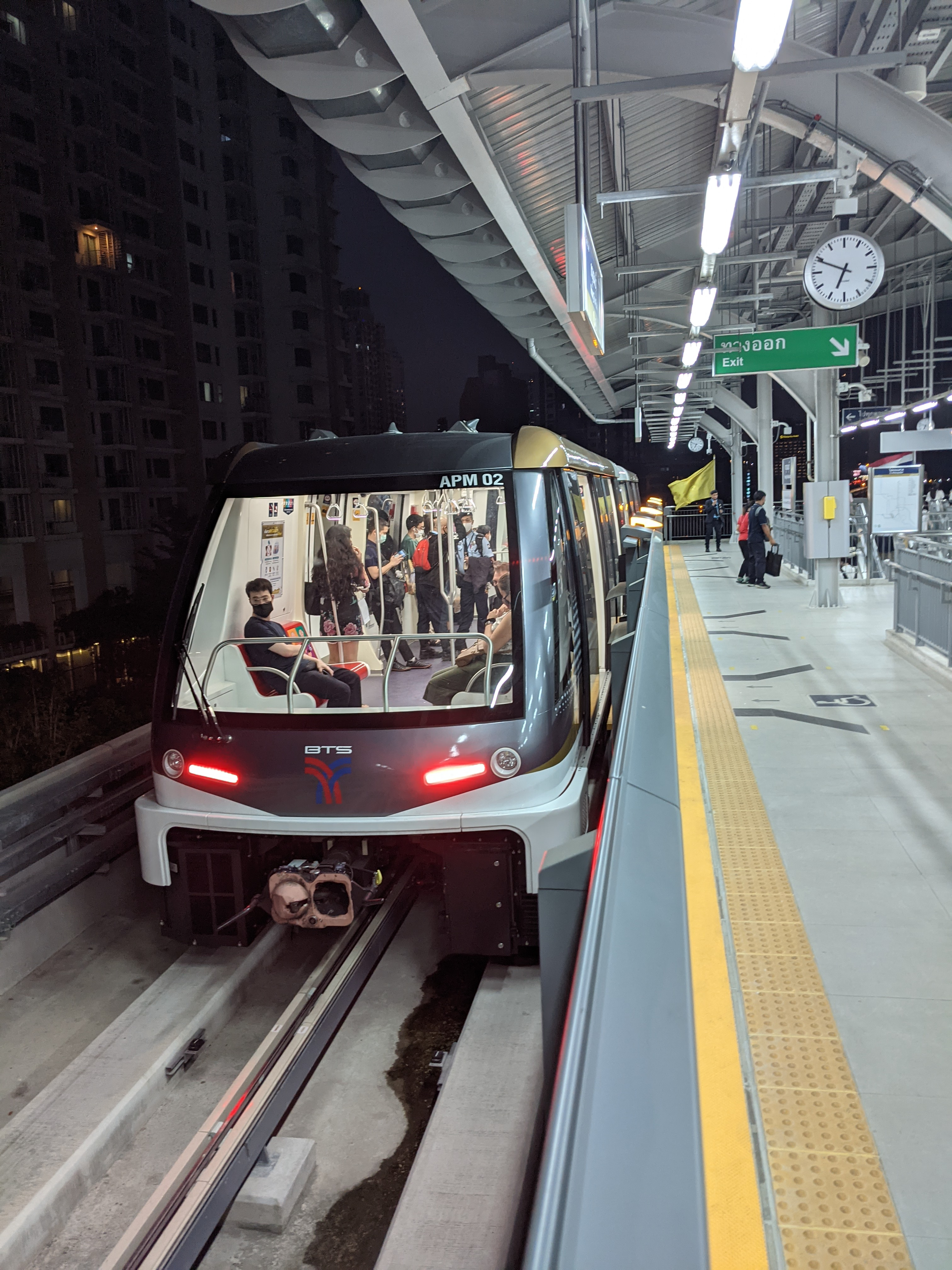
Alstom Innovia APM 300 vehicle at Krung Thon Buri station

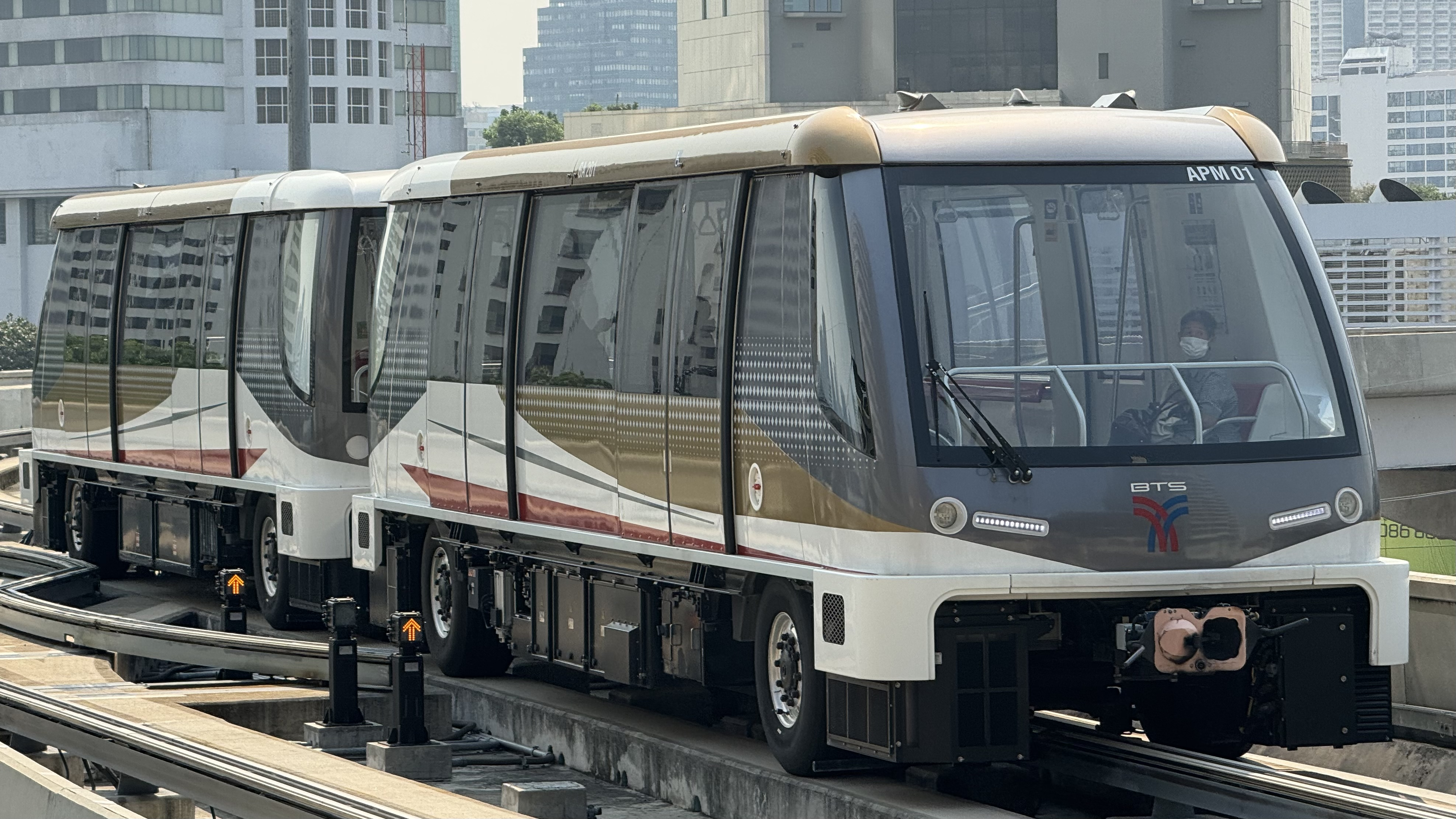
Alstom Innovia APM 300 vehicle approaching Khlong San station

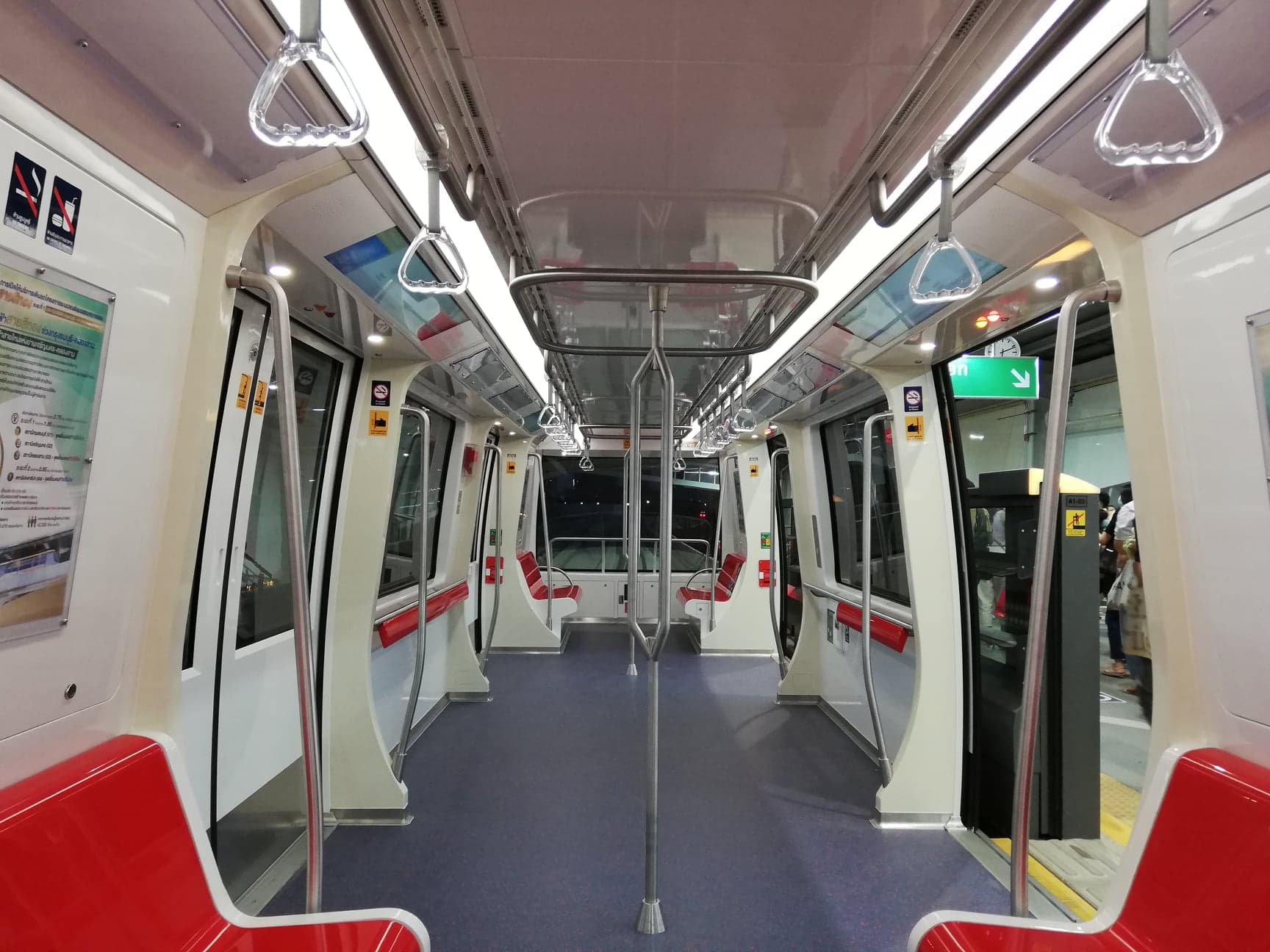
Interior of Gold Line Alstom Innovia APM 300

== Network map ==
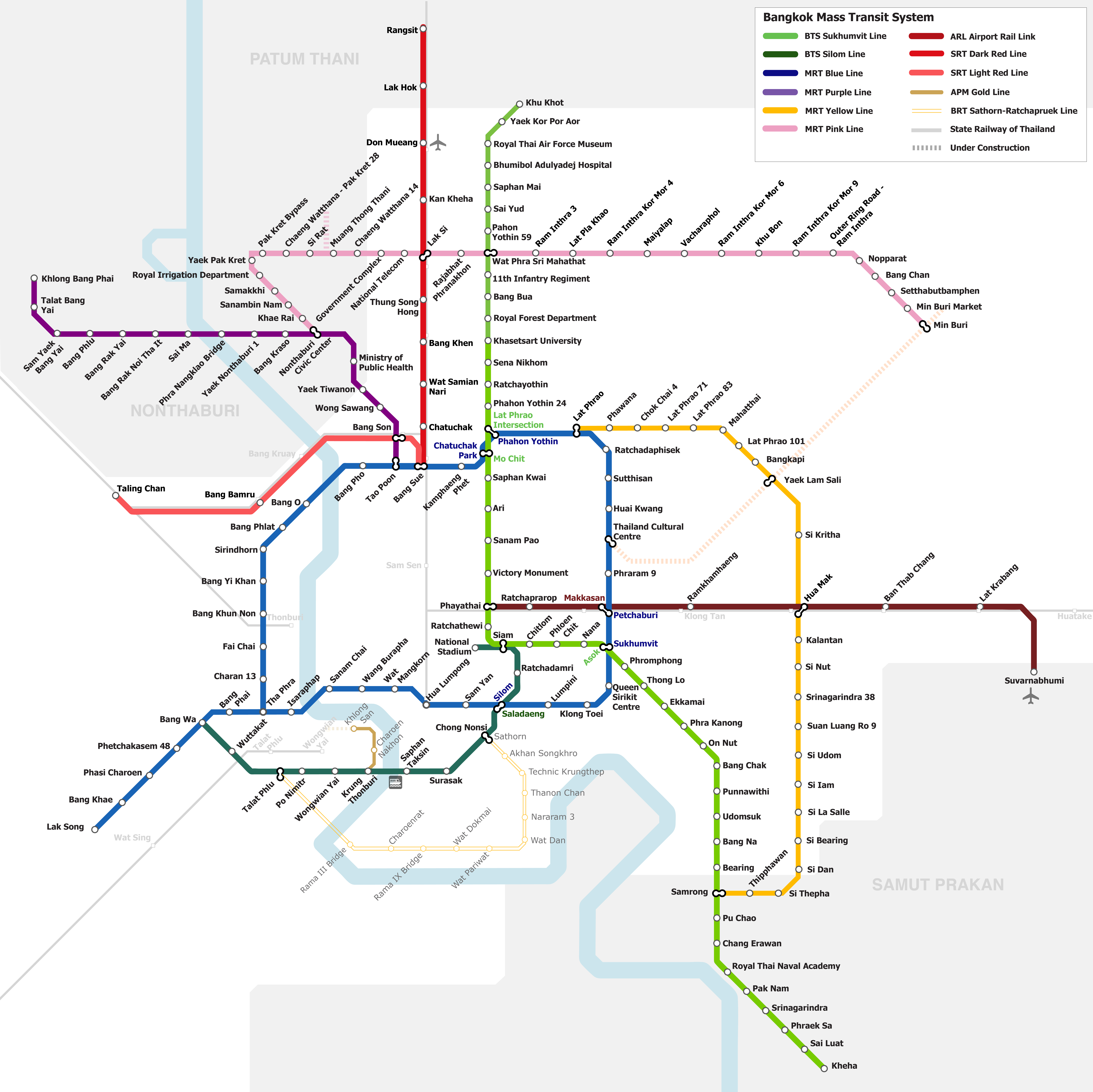

== Gallery ==
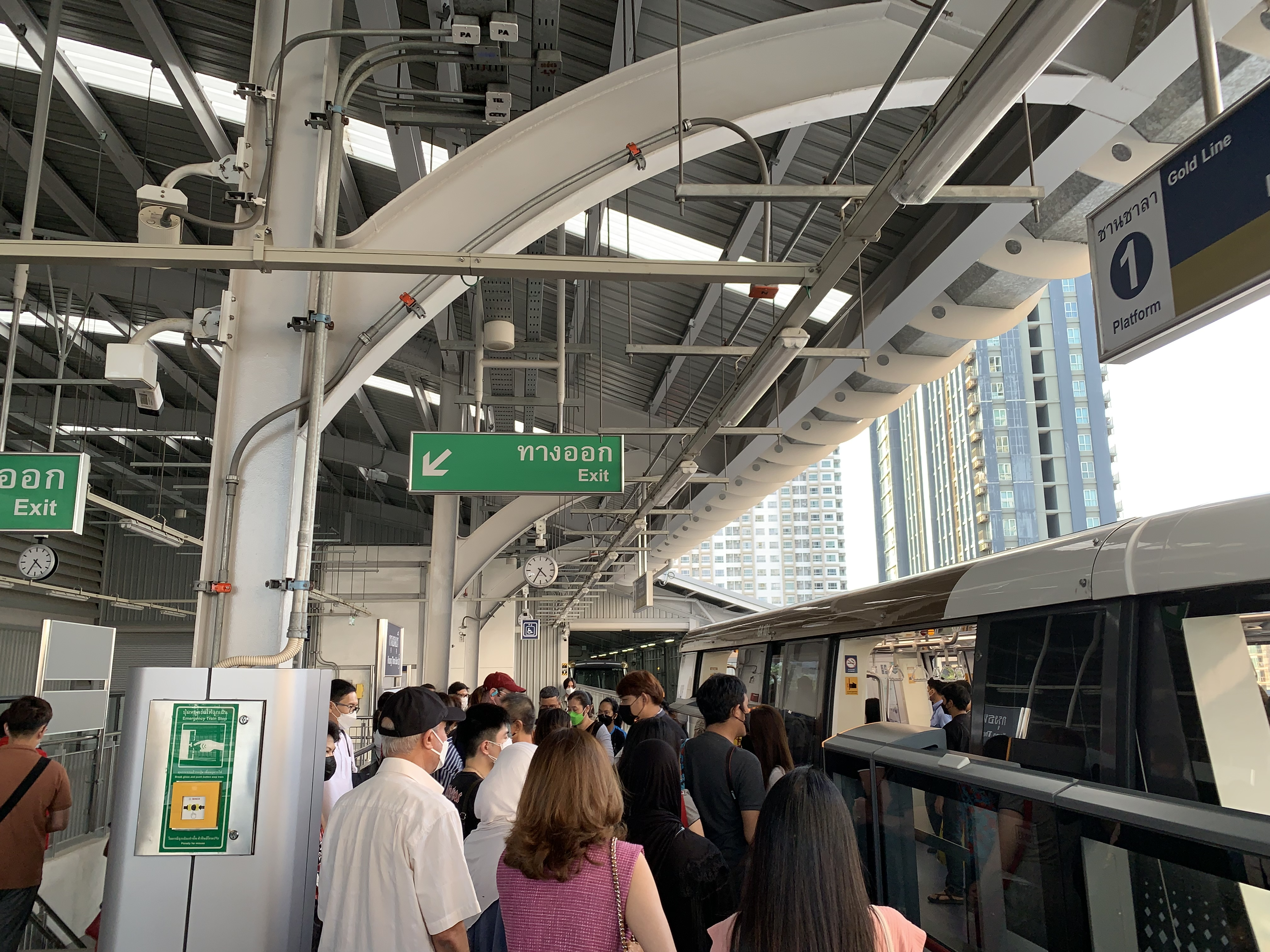
Passengers waiting to enter the train at Krung Thon Buri station

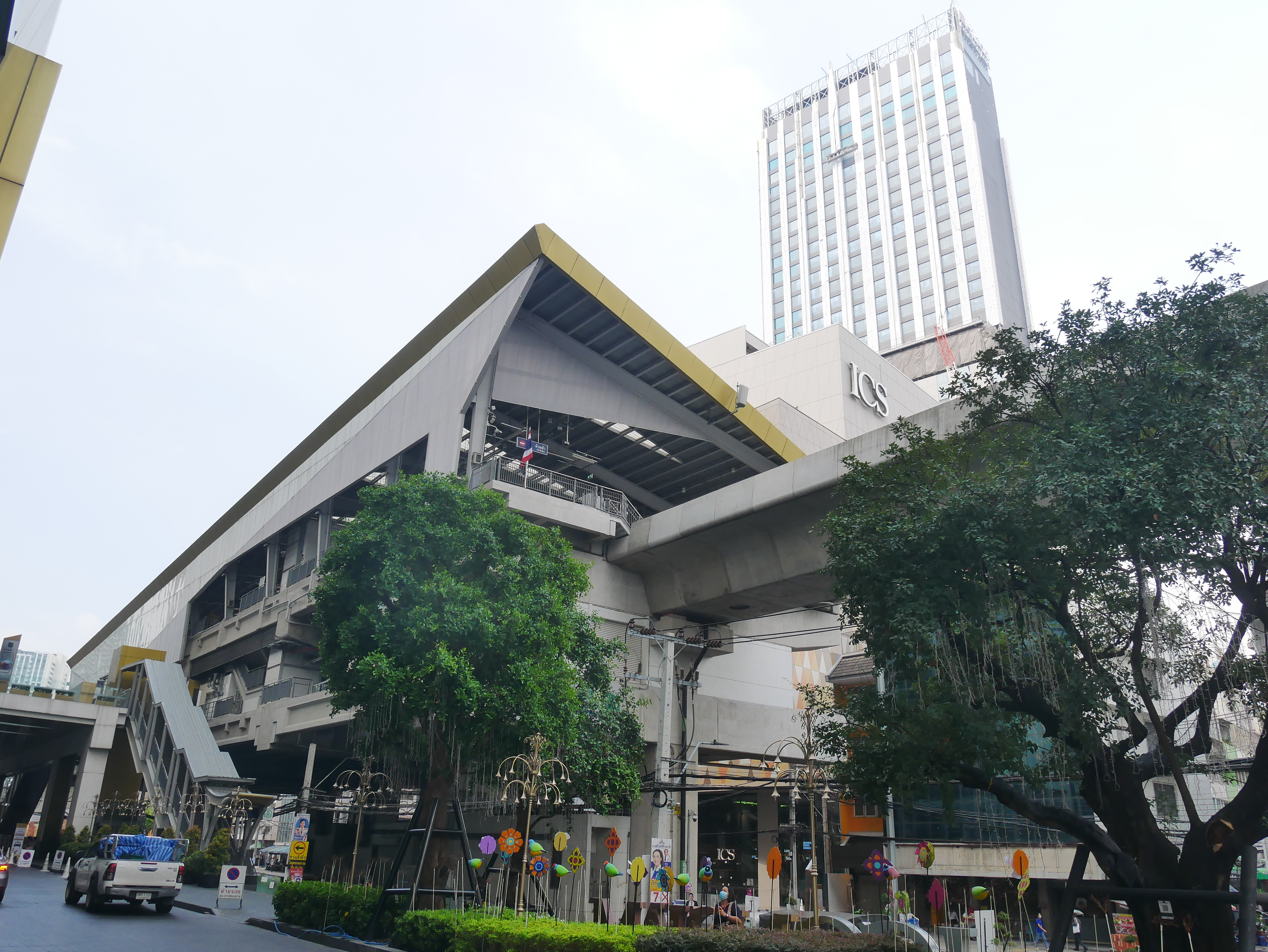
Exterior of Charoen Nakhon station

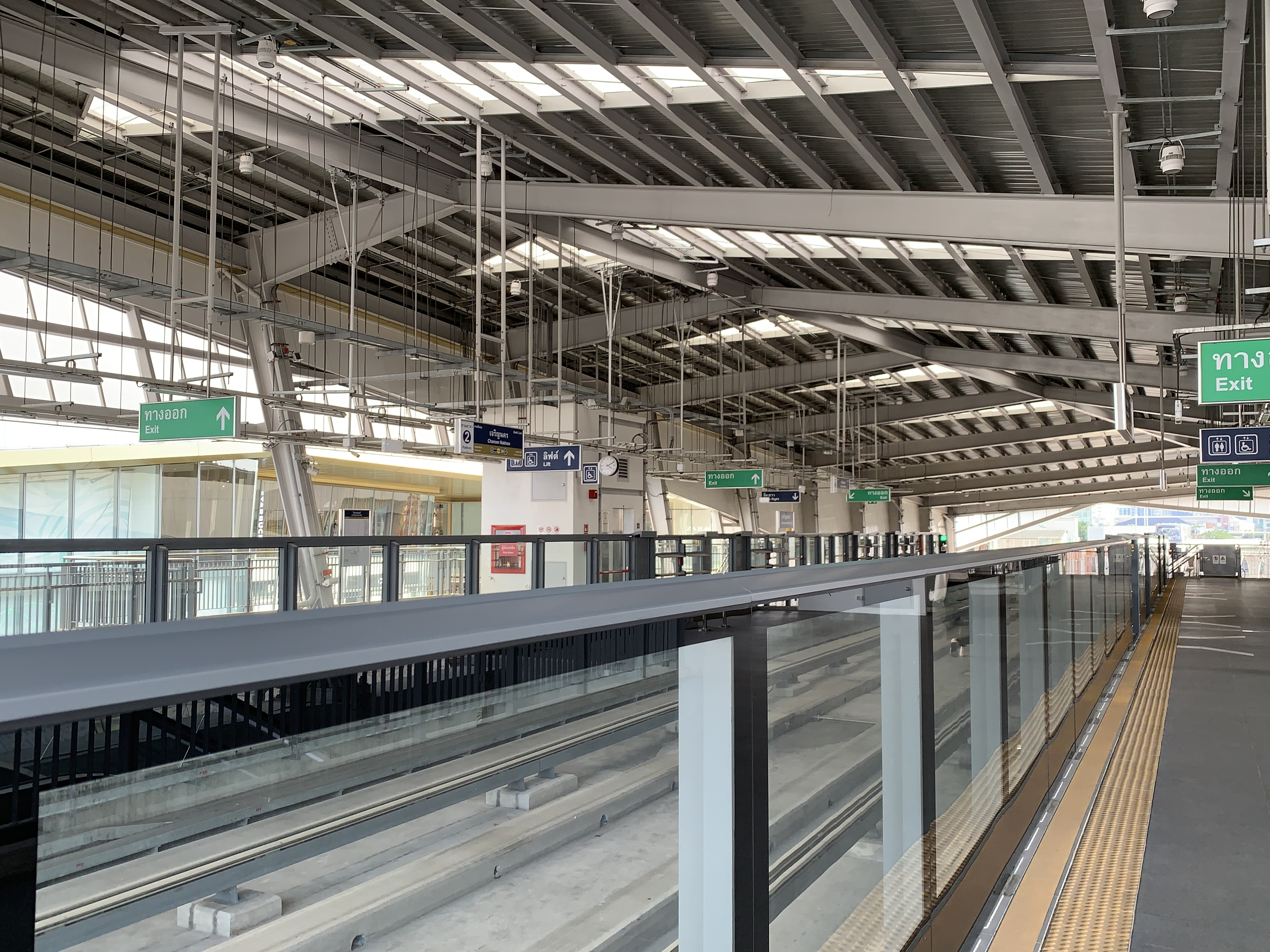
Platforms at Charoen Nakhon station

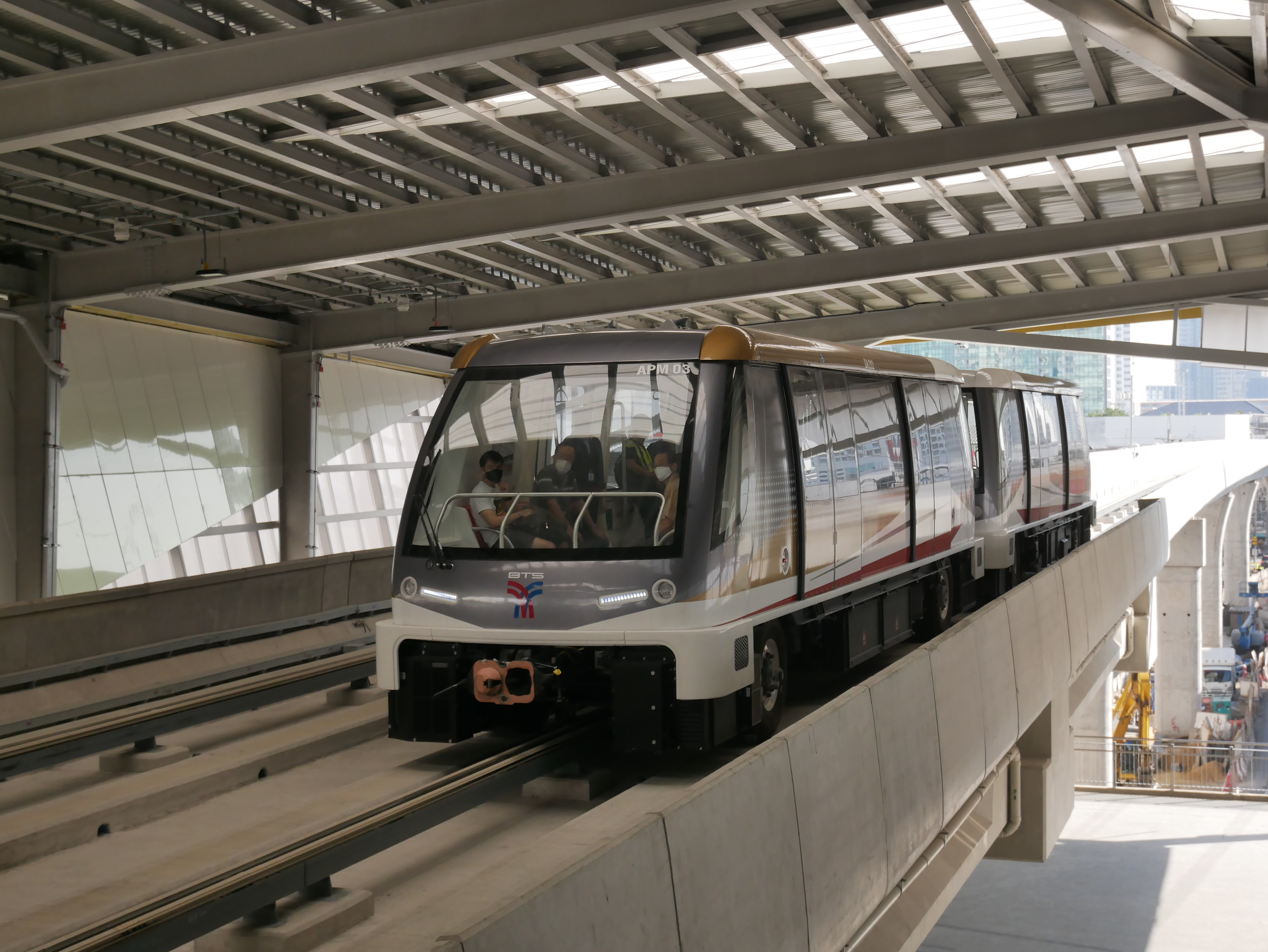
Alstom Innovia APM 300 approaching Charoen Nakhon station

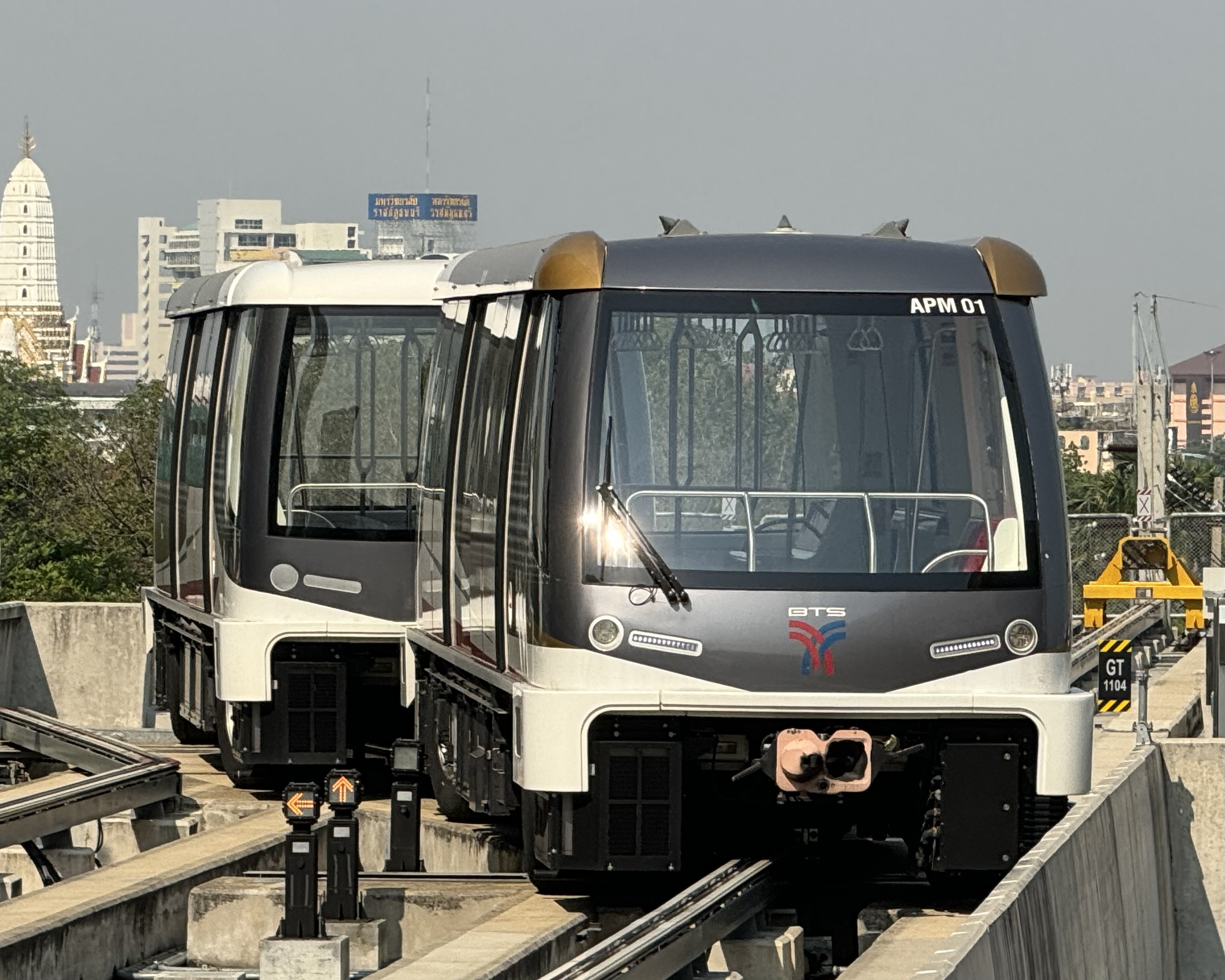
Alstom Innovia APM 300 turns around outside of Khlong San station

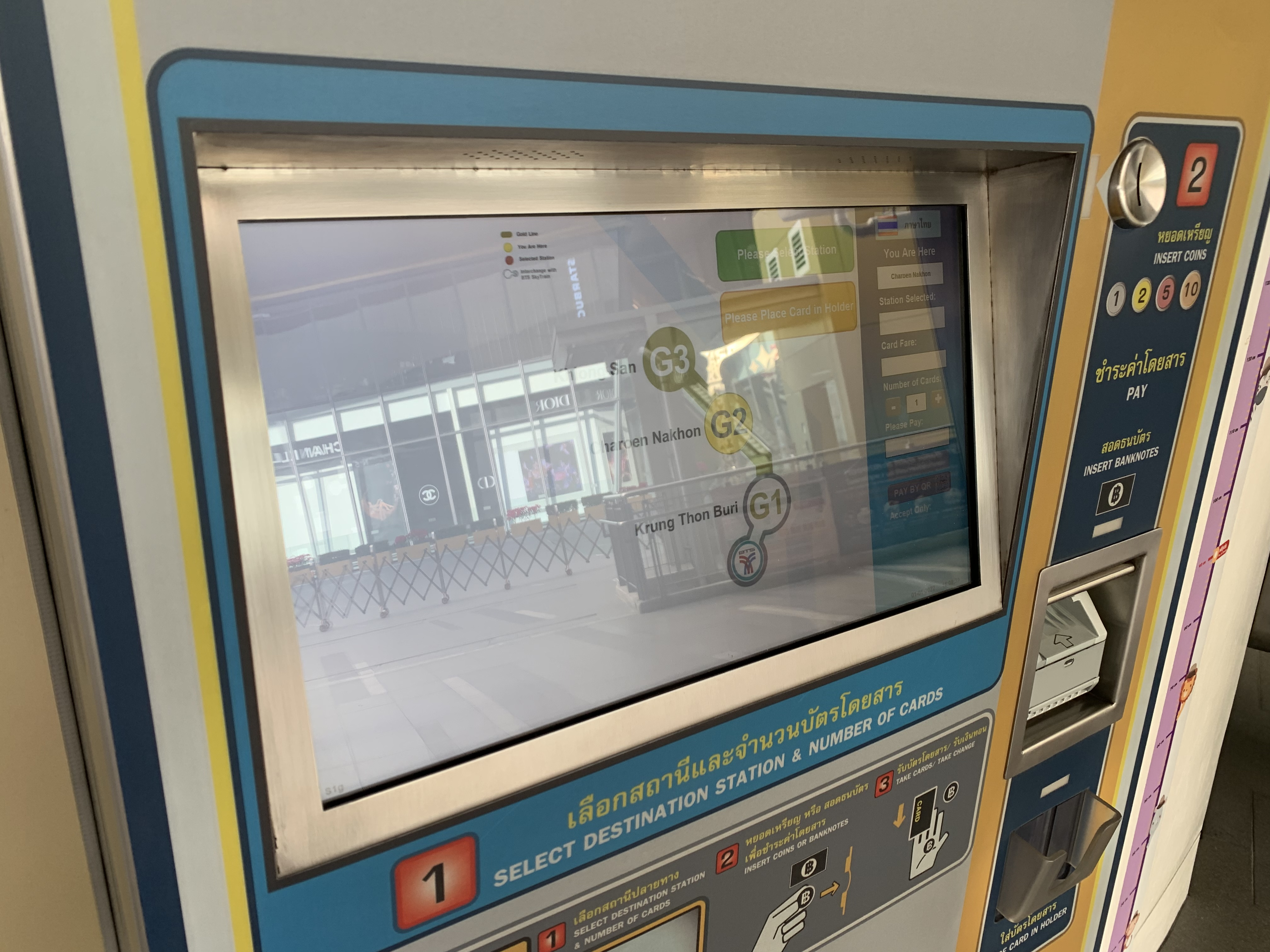
Ticket Value Machine of Gold Line

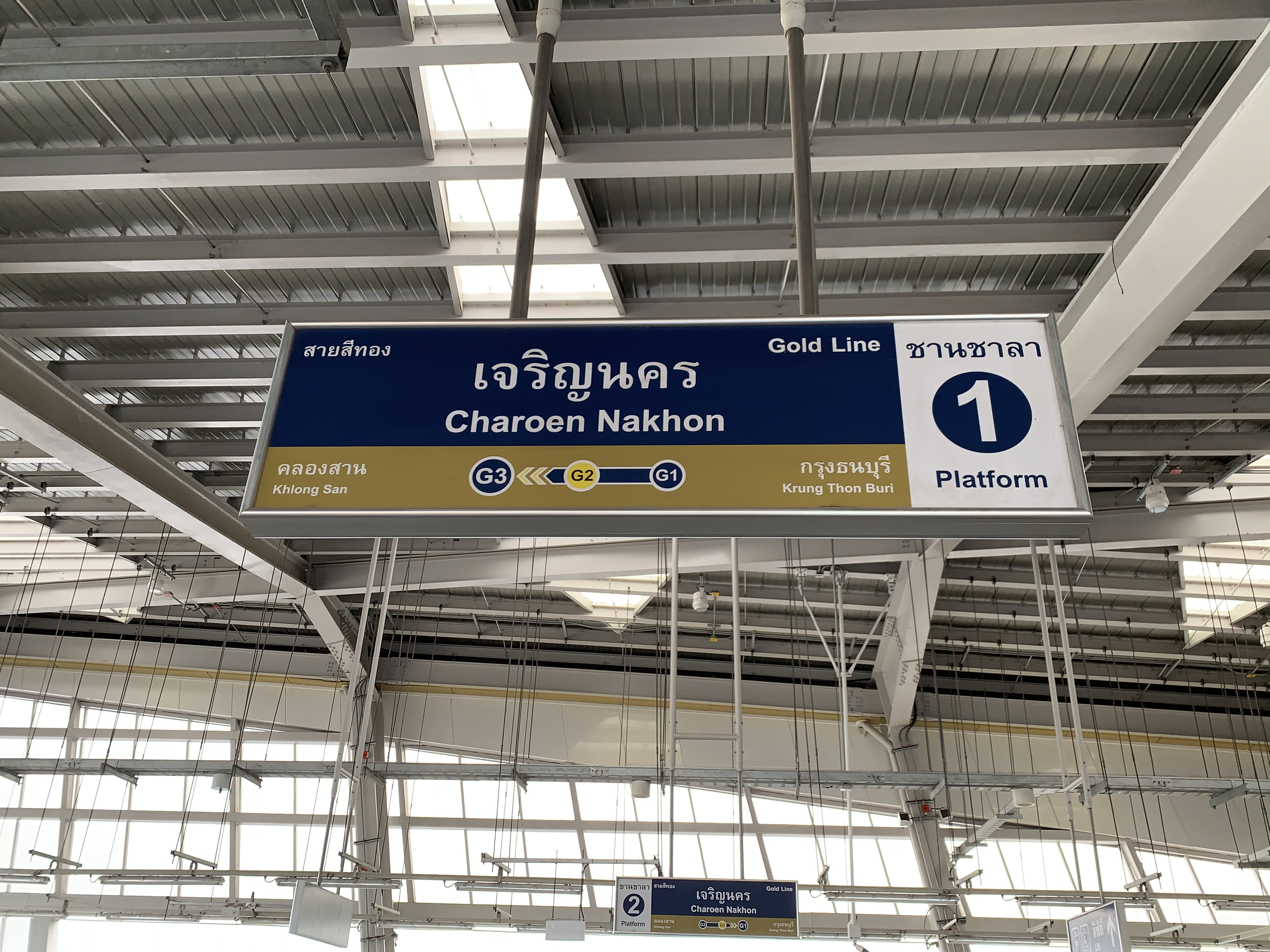
Signage of Gold Line

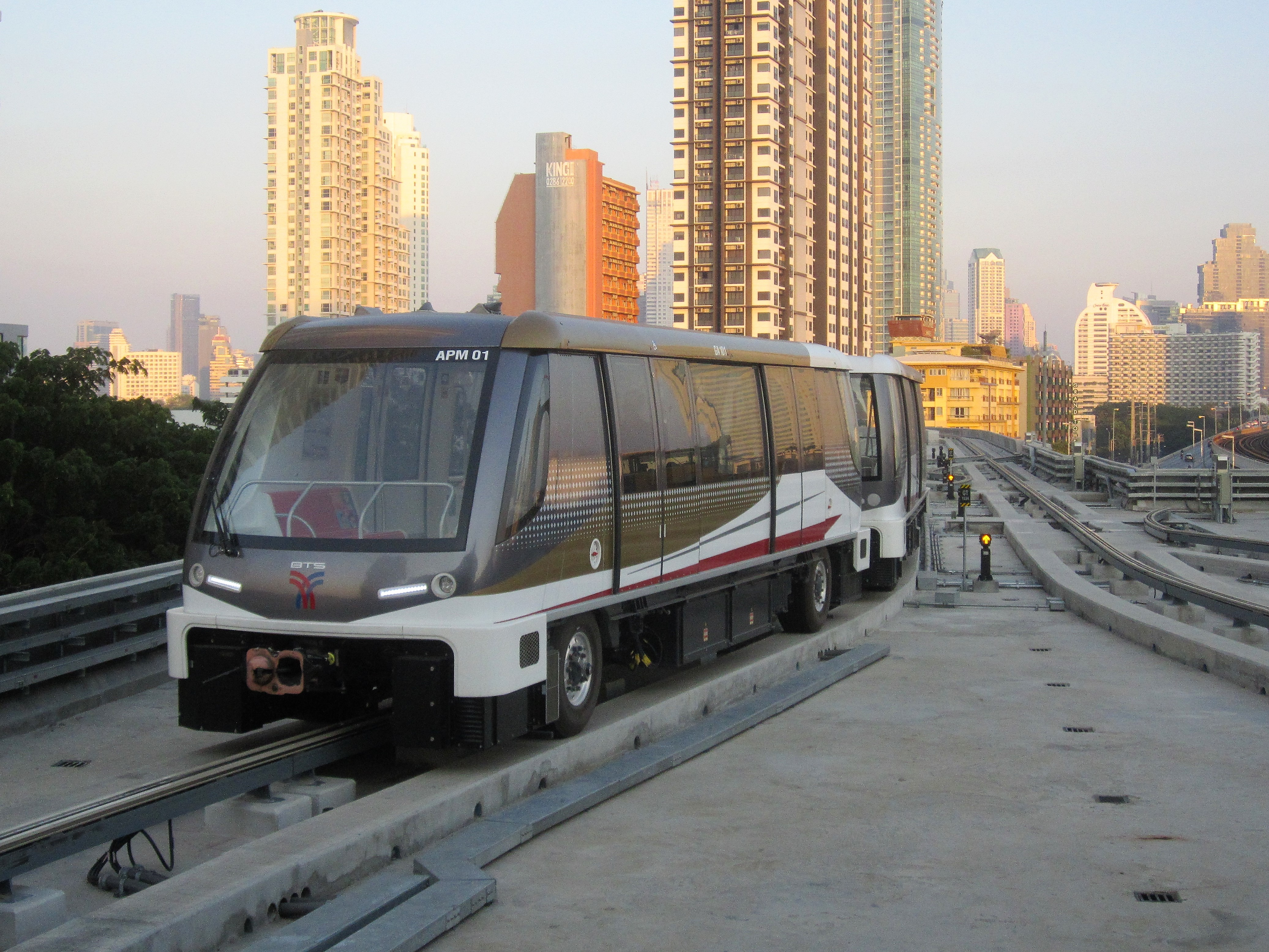
Train approaching Krung Thon Buri station

== See also ==
- Mass Rapid Transit Master Plan in Bangkok Metropolitan Region
- MRT (Bangkok)
- MRT Blue Line
- MRT Brown Line
- MRT Grey Line
- MRT Light Blue Line
- MRT Orange Line
- MRT Purple Line
- MRT Yellow Line
- BTS Skytrain
- Sukhumvit Line
- Silom Line
- Airport Rail Link (Bangkok)
- SRT Dark Red Line
- SRT Light Red Line
- Bangkok BRT
- BMA Bang Na-Airport Line
