= 11th Infantry Regiment BTS station =

Railway station in Bangkok, Thailand

11th Infantry Regiment กรมทหารราบที่ 11
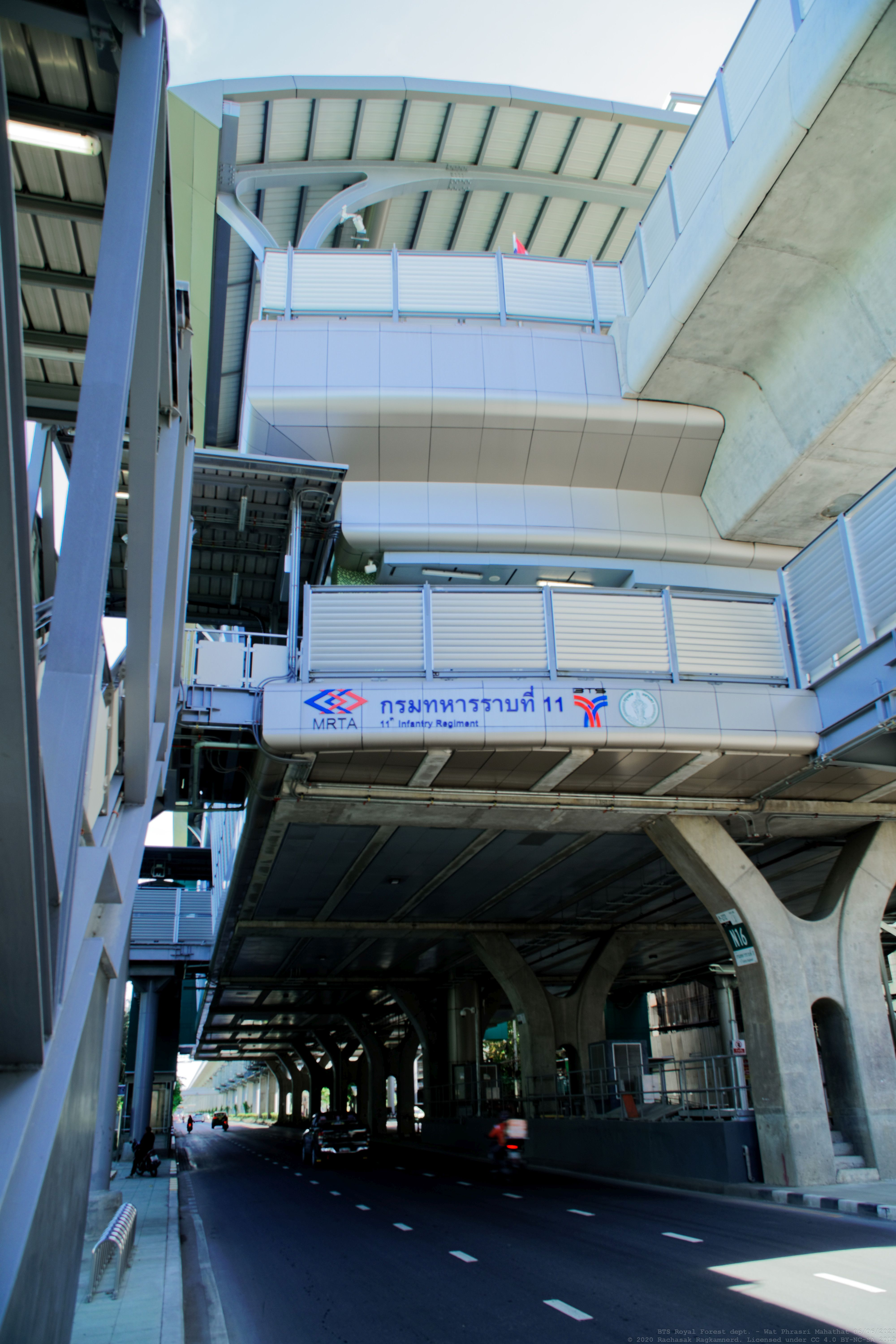

General information
- Location: Bang Khen, Bangkok, Thailand
- Coordinates: 13.8677°N 100.5920°E
- System: BTS
- Owner: Bangkok Metropolitan Administration (BMA)
- Operator: Bangkok Mass Transit System; Public Company Limited (BTSC)
- Line: Sukhumvit Line

Other information
- Station code: N16

History
- Opened: 5 June 2020

Passengers
- 2021: 918,910

Services
Preceding station	BTS Skytrain	Following station
Wat Phra Sri Mahathat towards Khu Khot	Sukhumvit Line	Bang Bua towards Kheha
Location

11th Infantry Regiment Station Traditional sign

11th Infantry Regiment Station (Thai: สถานีกรมทหารราบที่ 11, RTGS: Sathani Krom Thahan Rap Thi Sip Et, pronounced [sā.tʰǎː.nīː krōm tʰā.hǎːn râːp tʰîː sìp ʔèt]) is a BTS Skytrain station, on the Sukhumvit Line in Bangkok, Thailand. It is located in front of the headquarters of the 11th Infantry Regiment of the Royal Thai Army. The station is part of the northern extension of the Sukhumvit Line and opened on 5 June 2020, as part of phase 3.

== See also ==
- Bangkok Skytrain
