= Sena Nikhom BTS station =

BTS Skytrain station in Bangkok

Sena Nikhom เสนานิคม
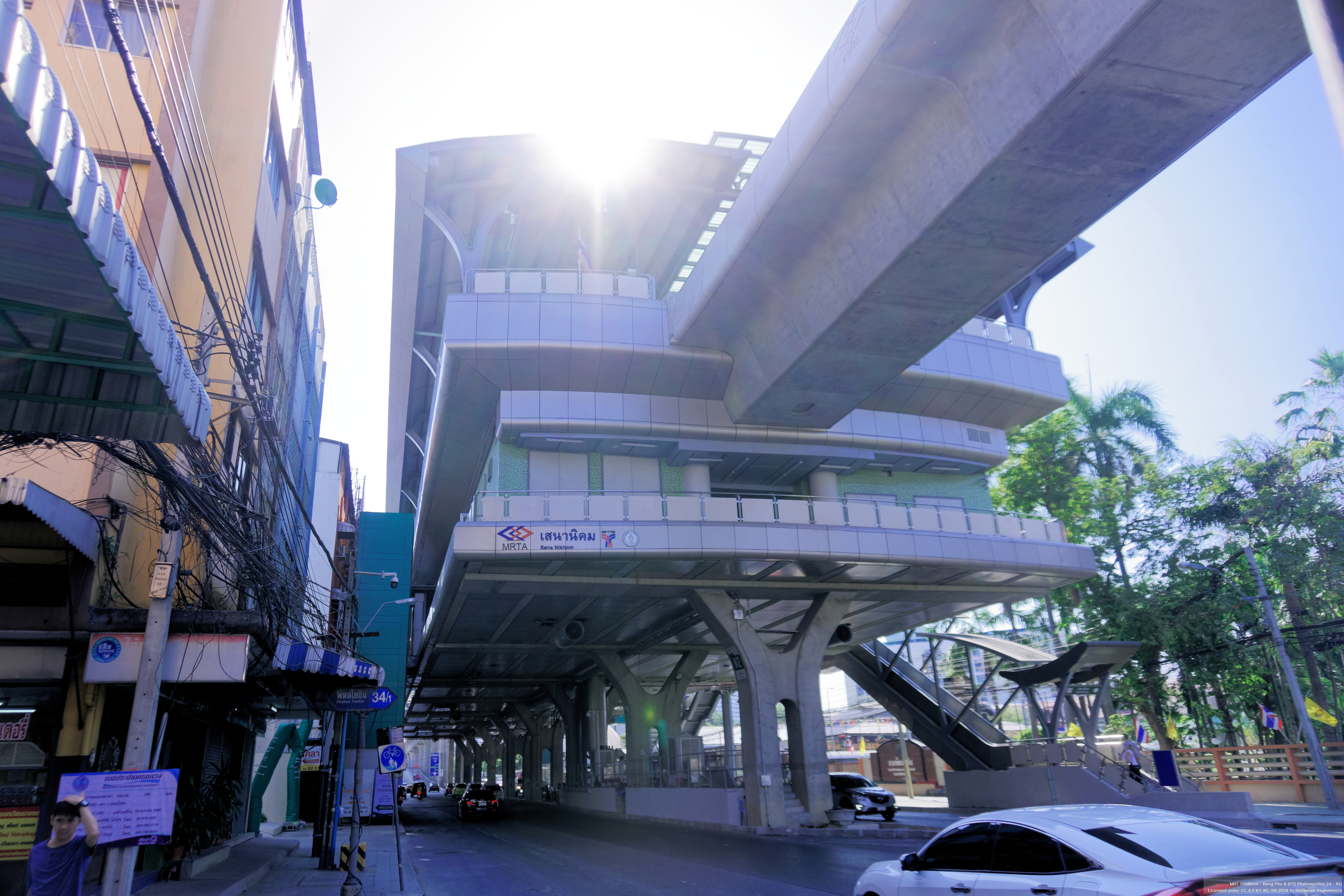

General information
- Location: Chatuchak, Bangkok, Thailand
- Coordinates: 13.8364°N 100.5736°E
- System: BTS
- Owner: Bangkok Metropolitan Administration (BMA)
- Operator: Bangkok Mass Transit System; Public Company Limited (BTSC)
- Line: Sukhumvit Line

Other information
- Station code: N12

History
- Opening: 4 December 2019

Passengers
- 2021: 2,249,313

Services
Preceding station	BTS Skytrain	Following station
Kasetsart University towards Khu Khot	Sukhumvit Line	Ratchayothin towards Kheha
Location

Sena Nikhom Station Traditional sign

Sena Nikhom Station (Thai: สถานีเสนานิคม, pronounced [sā.tʰǎː.nīː sěː.nāː ní(ʔ).kʰōm]) is a BTS Skytrain station, on the Sukhumvit Line in Bangkok, Thailand. The station was planned to open in 2020 when all stations on the northern extension was completed, but the Ministry of Transport requested the station to open in phase 2 (Ha Yaek Lat Phrao-Kasetsart University) in December 2019.

== See also ==
- Bangkok Skytrain
