= Royal Forest Department BTS station =

Mass transit station

Royal Forest Department กรมป่าไม้
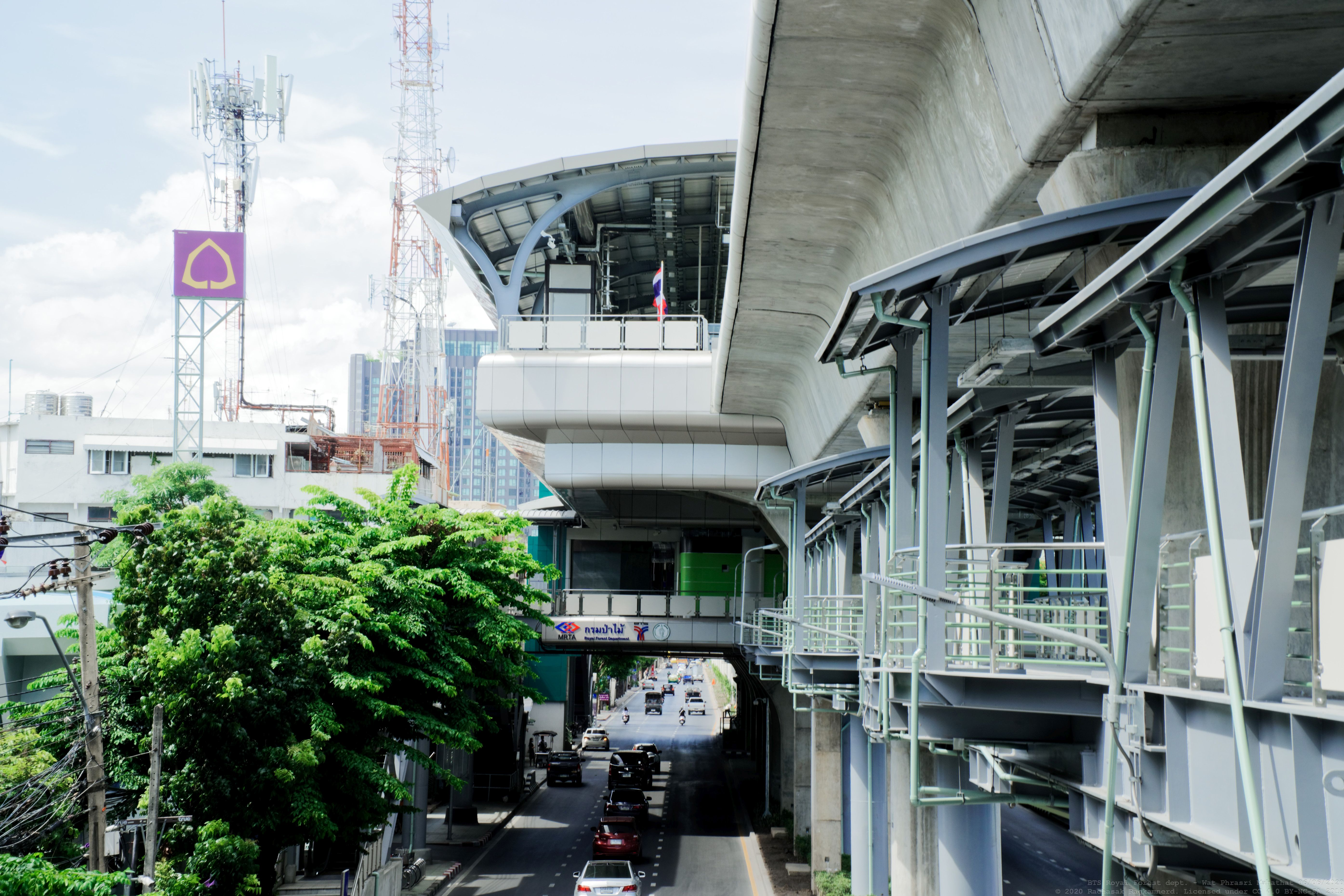

General information
- Location: Chatuchak, Bangkok, Thailand
- Coordinates: 13.8504°N 100.5819°E
- System: BTS
- Owner: Bangkok Metropolitan Administration (BMA)
- Operator: Bangkok Mass Transit System; Public Company Limited (BTSC)
- Line: Sukhumvit Line

Other information
- Station code: N14

History
- Opened: 5 June 2020

Passengers
- 2021: 644,804

Services
| Preceding station | BTS Skytrain | Following station |
|---|---|---|
| Bang Bua towards Khu Khot | Sukhumvit Line | Kasetsart University towards Kheha |
Location

Royal Forest Department Station Traditional sign

Royal Forest Department Station (Thai: สถานีกรมป่าไม้, RTGS: Sathani Krom Pa Mai, pronounced [sā.tʰǎː.nīː krōm pàː máːj]) is a BTS Skytrain station, on the Sukhumvit Line in Bangkok, Thailand. It is located in front of the headquarters of the Royal Forest Department, Ministry of Natural Resources and Environment. The station is part of the northern extension of the Sukhumvit Line and opened on 5 June 2020, as part of phase 3.

== See also ==
- Bangkok Skytrain
