= Phraek Sa BTS station =

Phraek Sa แพรกษา
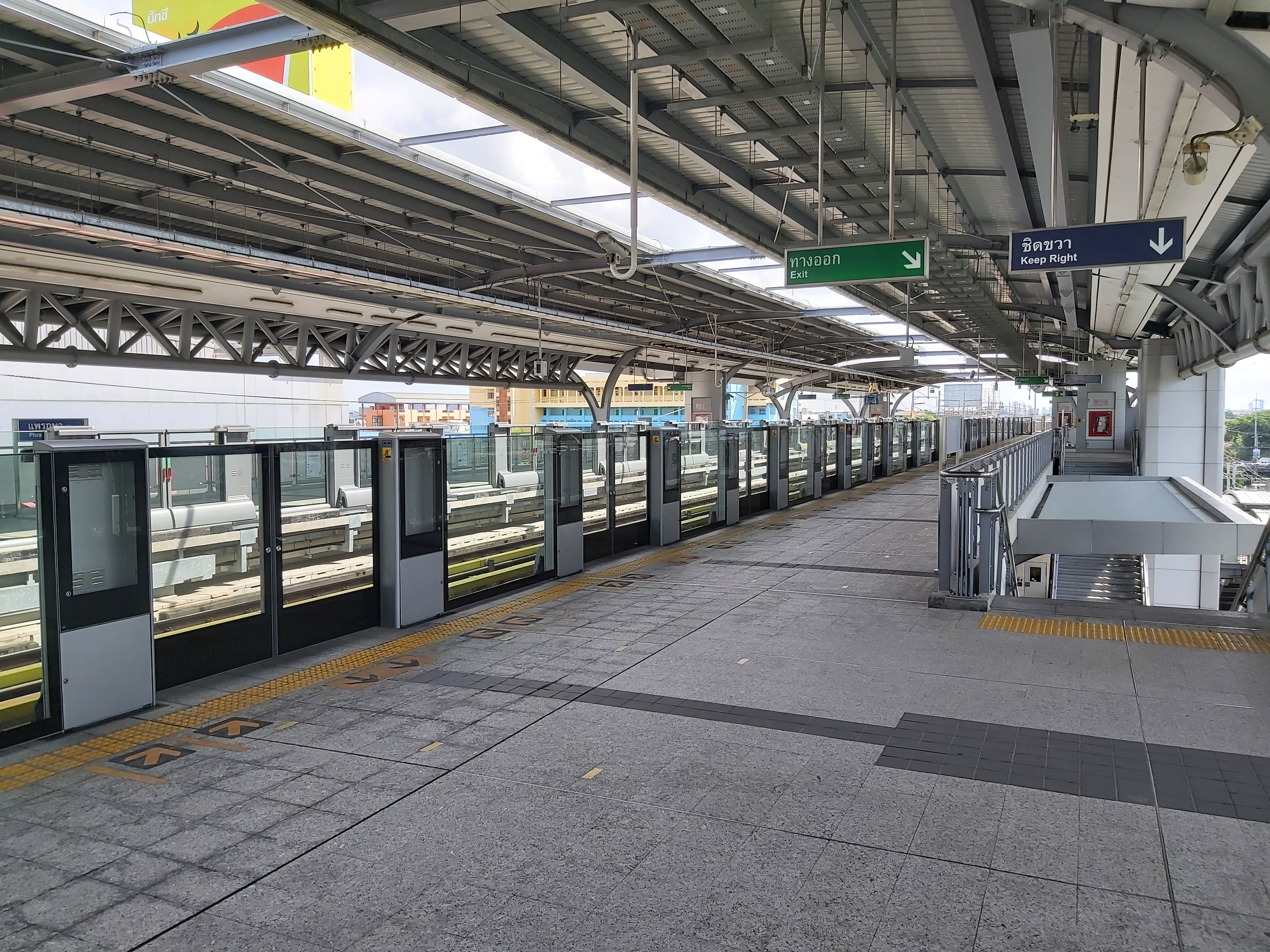
- Platform of Phraek Sa BTS station

General information
- Location: Mueang Samut Prakan, Samut Prakan, Thailand
- Coordinates: 13.5844°N 100.6079°E
- System: BTS
- Owner: Bangkok Metropolitan Administration (BMA)
- Operator: Bangkok Mass Transit System; Public Company Limited (BTSC)
- Line: Sukhumvit Line

Other information
- Station code: E21

History
- Opened: 6 December 2018

Passengers
- 2021: 1,376,742

Services
Preceding station	BTS Skytrain	Following station
Srinagarindra towards Khu Khot	Sukhumvit Line	Sai Luat towards Kheha
Location

Phreak Sa Station Traditional sign

Phraek Sa station (Thai: สถานีแพรกษา, pronounced [sā.tʰǎː.nīː pʰrɛ̂ːk.kā.sǎː]) is a BTS Skytrain station, on the Sukhumvit Line in Samut Prakan Province, Thailand. It is located next to Robinson Lifestyle Samut Prakan Mall and Big C Supercenter Samut Prakan.

It opened on 6 December 2018 as part of the 13-km eastern extension. Rides on the extension were free until April 16, 2019.

== See also ==
- Bangkok Skytrain
