= Bang Bua BTS station =

Railway station in Bangkok, Thailand

Bang Bua บางบัว
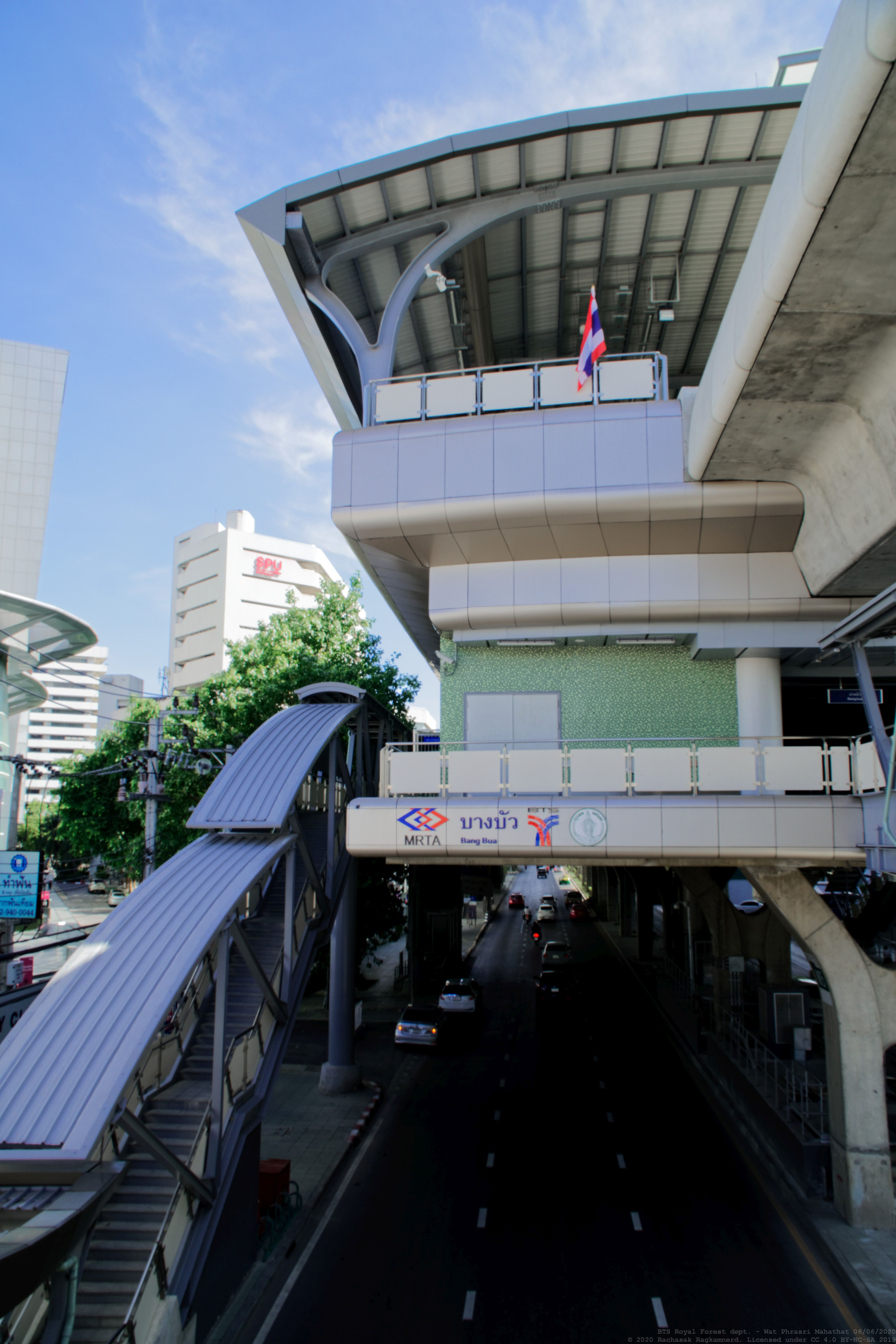

General information
- Location: Chatuchak, Bangkok, Thailand
- Coordinates: 13.8561°N 100.5852°E
- System: BTS
- Owner: Bangkok Metropolitan Administration (BMA)
- Operator: Bangkok Mass Transit System; Public Company Limited (BTSC)
- Line: Sukhumvit Line

Other information
- Station code: N15

History
- Opened: 5 June 2020

Passengers
- 2021: 619,258

Services
| Preceding station | BTS Skytrain | Following station |
|---|---|---|
| 11th Infantry Regiment towards Khu Khot | Sukhumvit Line | Royal Forest Department towards Kheha |
Location

Bang Bua Station Traditional sign

Bang Bua Station (Thai: สถานีบางบัว, pronounced [sā.tʰǎː.nīː bāːŋ būa̯]) is a BTS Skytrain station, on the Sukhumvit Line in Bangkok, Thailand. It is located in front of the Bang Khen Main Campus of Sripatum University and Bang Bua School. The station is part of the northern extension of the Sukhumvit Line and opened on 5 June 2020, as part of phase 3.

== Naming conflict ==
In initial proposals, the station was named Bang Bua. In 2013, before the construction of the station, Sripatum University requested the station to be named Sripatum Station on the grounds that it was a name bestowed upon the university by Princess Srinagarindra. The Mass Rapid Transit Authority of Thailand (MRTA), who was then the owner of the project approved this name change as it considered a name bestowed by a member of the royal family to be auspicious. However, this was strongly opposed by the general public, as the area was known to the locals as Bang Bua and there were possible issues with using the name of a private university, which could be seen as a form of advertising. After MRTA moved ownership to Bangkok Metropolitan Administration (BMA), complaints continued to be sent to the BMA and the BMA approved the name change back to Bang Bua.

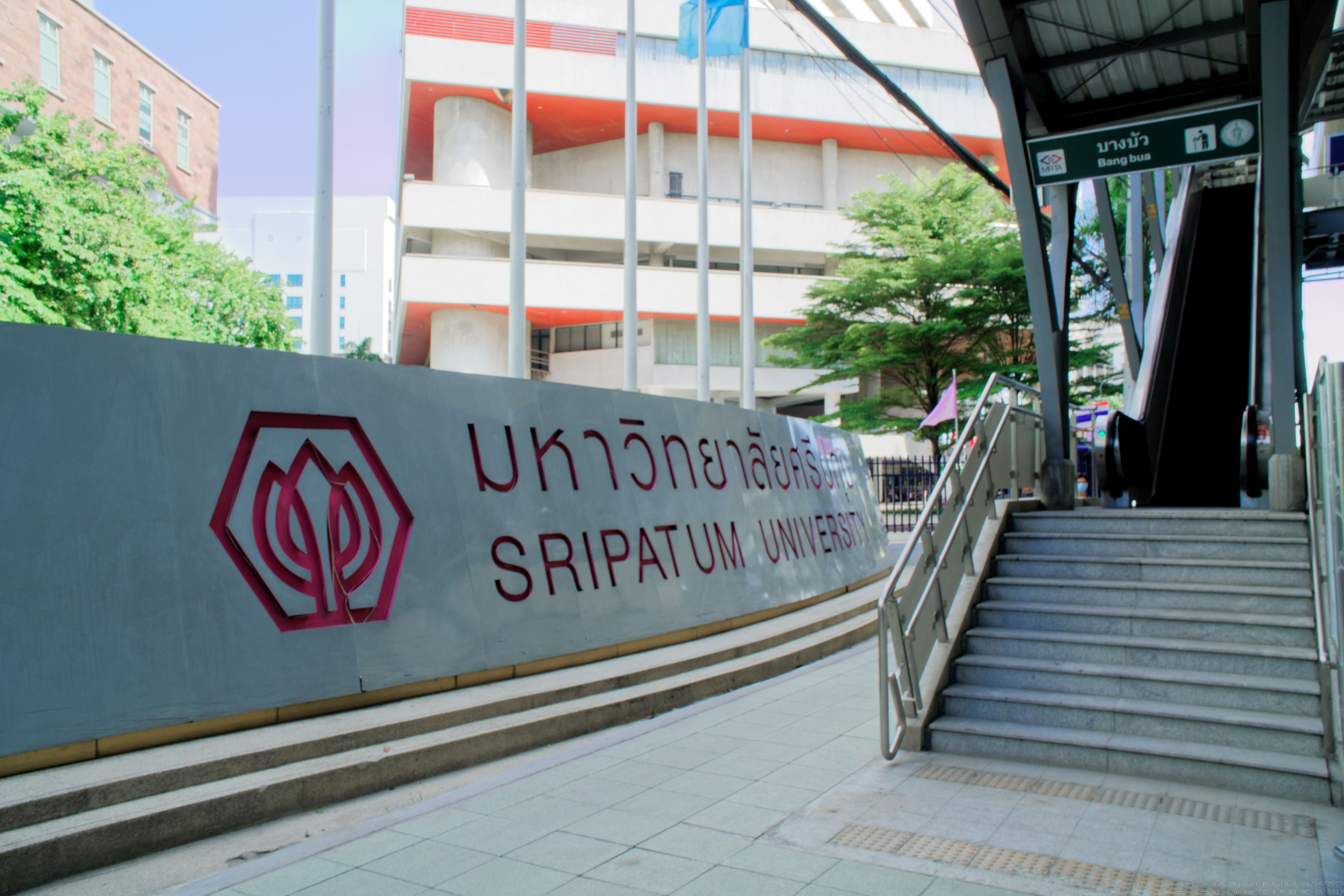
Station entrance near Sripatum University

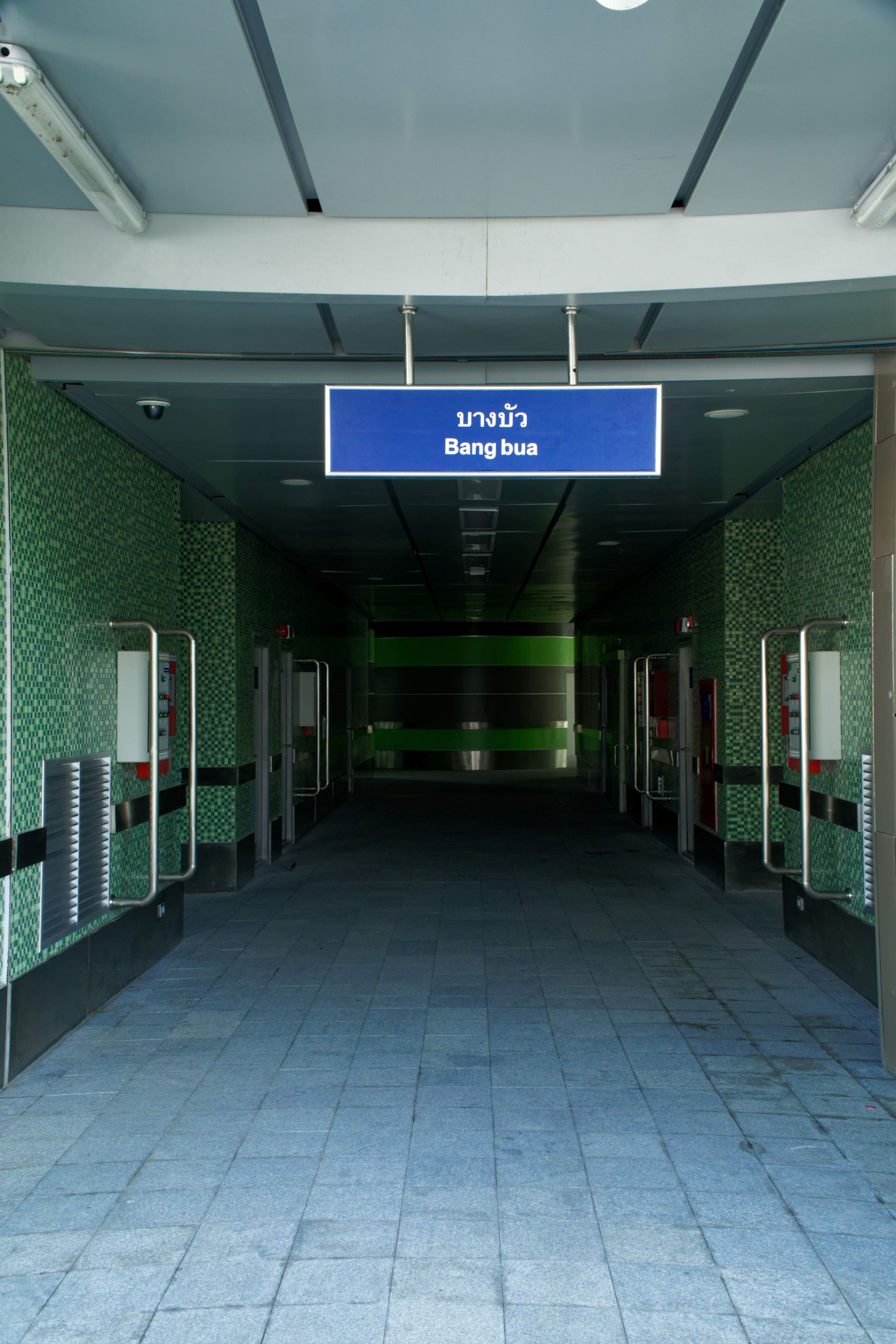
station entrance near Bang Bua canal

== See also ==
- Bangkok Skytrain
