= Kasetsart University BTS station =

BTS Skytrain station in Bangkok

Kasetsart University มหาวิทยาลัยเกษตรศาสตร์
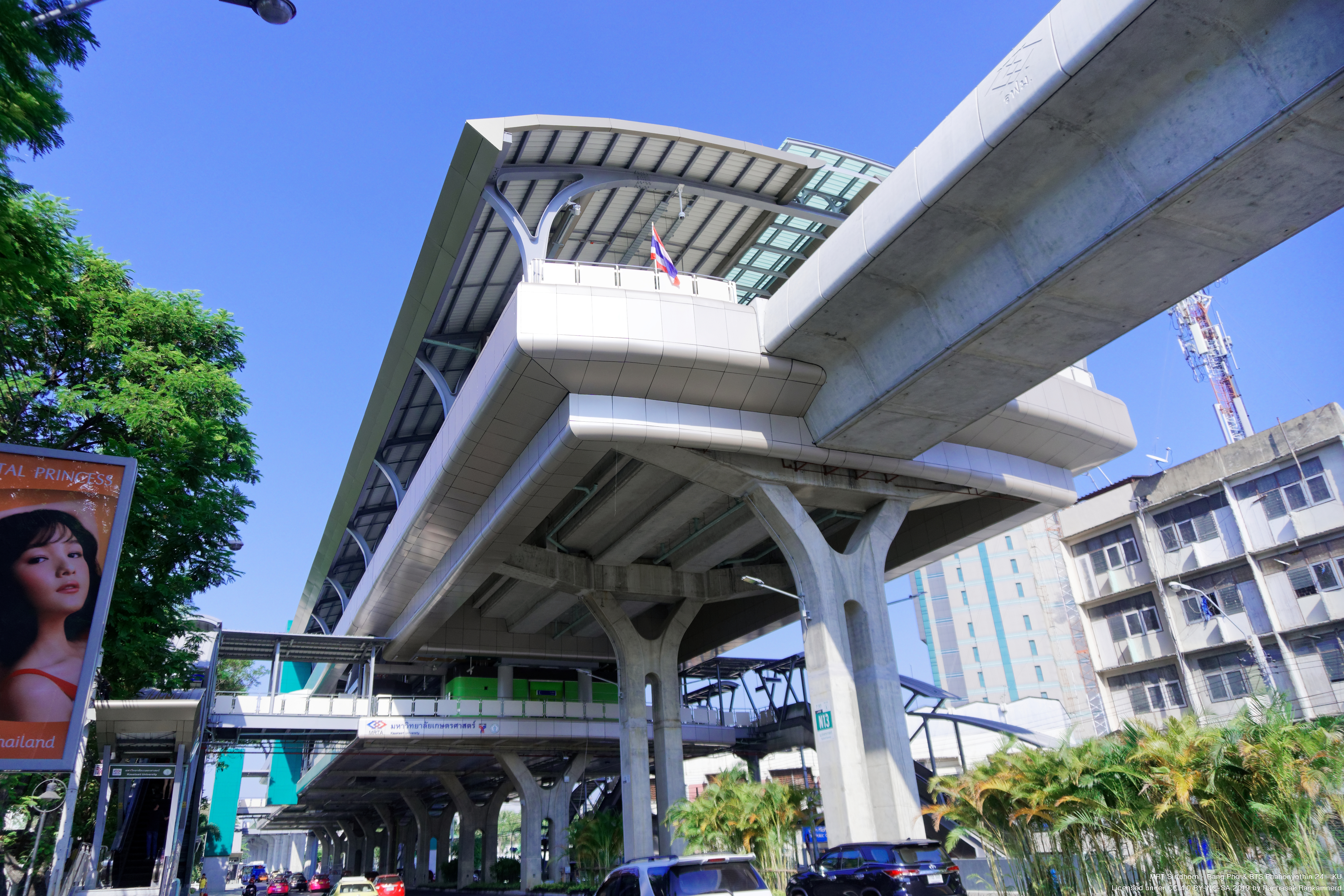

General information
- Location: Chatuchak, Bangkok, Thailand
- Coordinates: 13.8424°N 100.5771°E
- System: BTS
- Owner: Bangkok Metropolitan Administration (BMA)
- Operator: Bangkok Mass Transit System; Public Company Limited (BTSC)
- Line: Sukhumvit Line

Other information
- Station code: N13

History
- Opening: 4 December 2019

Passengers
- 2021: 1,609,302

Services
Preceding station	BTS Skytrain	Following station
Royal Forest Department towards Khu Khot	Sukhumvit Line	Sena Nikhom towards Kheha
Location

Kasetsart University Station Traditional sign

Kasetsart University Station (Thai: สถานีมหาวิทยาลัยเกษตรศาสตร์, RTGS: Sathani Maha Witthayalai Kasetsat, pronounced [sā.tʰǎː.nīː mā.hǎː wít.tʰā.jāː.lāj kā.sèːt sàːt]) is a BTS Skytrain station, on the Sukhumvit Line in Bangkok, Thailand situated near Kasetsart University Bangkhen campus. It was the Northern terminus station of the Sukhumvit line from 4 December 2019 until the opening of an additional 4 stations on the line toward Wat Phra Sri Mahathat on 5 June 2020.

Passenger traffic peaked during the annual Kaset Fair held within Kasetsart University and a total of 676,571 passengers were reported to have passed through the station between 3–10 February 2023.

== See also ==
- Bangkok Skytrain
