= Yaek Kor Por Aor BTS station =

Rapid transit station in Bangkok

Yaek Kor Por Aor แยก คปอ.
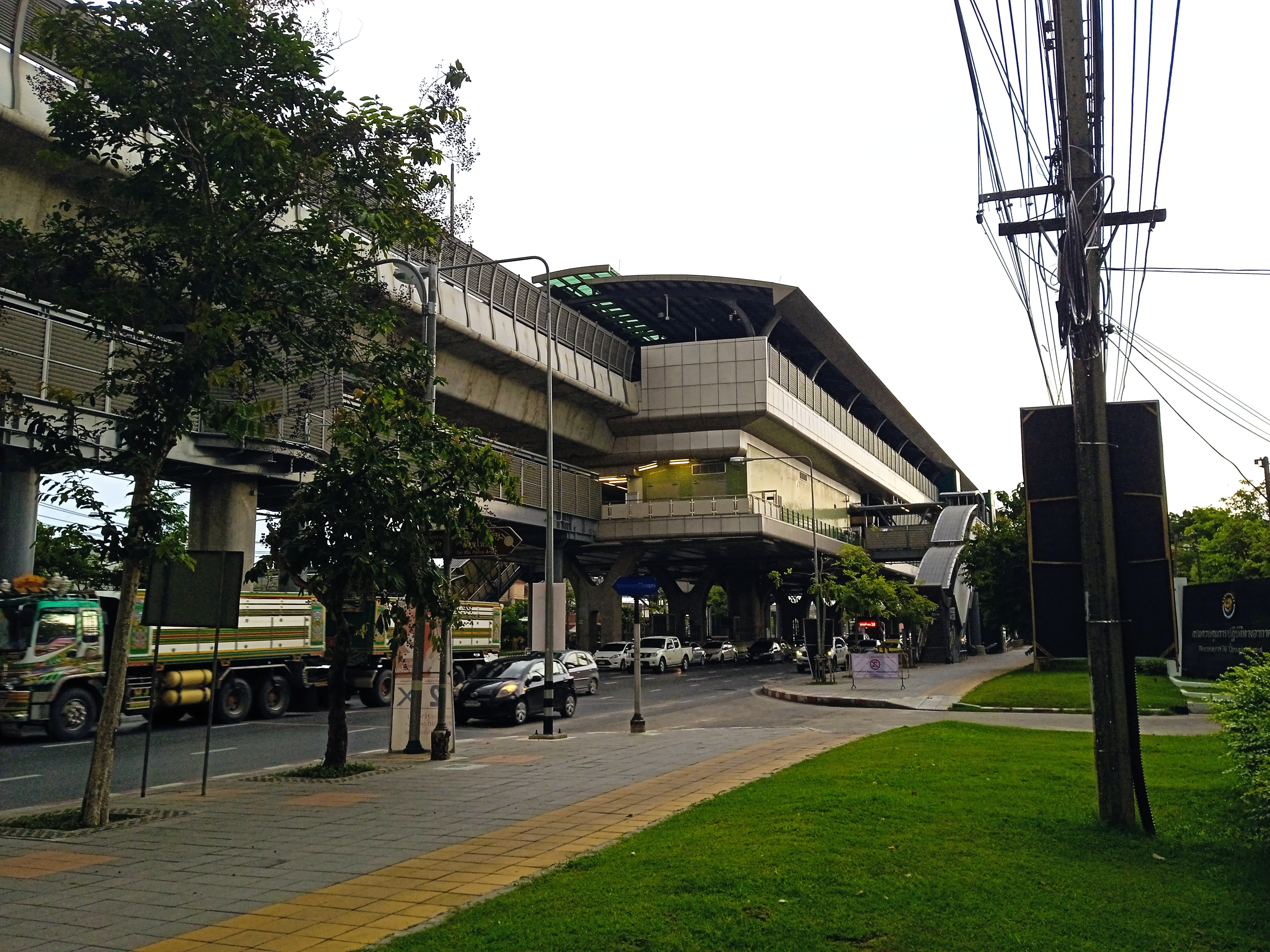

General information
- Location: Don Mueang and Sai Mai, Bangkok, Thailand
- Coordinates: 13.9249°N 100.6259°E
- System: BTS
- Owner: Bangkok Metropolitan Administration (BMA)
- Operator: Bangkok Mass Transit System; Public Company Limited (BTSC)
- Line: Sukhumvit Line

Other information
- Station code: N23

History
- Opened: 16 December 2020
- Former names: KM.25

Passengers
- 2021: 1,225,961

Services
Preceding station	BTS Skytrain	Following station
Khu Khot Terminus	Sukhumvit Line	Royal Thai Air Force Museum towards Kheha
Location

Yaek Kor Por Aor Station Traditional sign

Yaek Kor Por Aor Station (Thai: สถานีแยก คปอ., RTGS: Sathani Yaek Khopo-o, pronounced [sā.tʰǎː.nīː jɛ̂ːk kʰɔ̄ː.pɔ̄ː.ʔɔ̄ː]) is a BTS Skytrain station, on the Sukhumvit Line in Bangkok, Thailand. The station is part of the northern extension of the Sukhumvit Line and opened on 16 December 2020, as part of phase 4. It is the northernmost station of the Sukhumvit Line within Bangkok's boundary.

== History ==
The station was initially named KM.25 Station as it was located on the 25th kilometre of Phahonyothin Road and there were no major landmarks to name the station. It was renamed to Yaek Kor Por Aor Station (lit. 'Kor Por Aor Intersection') after an intersection with the same name of a new road built by the MRTA linking Phahonyothin Road and Lam Lukka Road. "Kor Por Aor" in Thai stands for the Directorate of Air Operations Control (DOAC) of the Royal Thai Air Force which is located nearby.

== See also ==
- Bangkok Skytrain
