= Srinagarindra BTS station =

One of the Bangkok Skytrain stations on Skukhumvit line

Srinagarindra ศรีนครินทร์
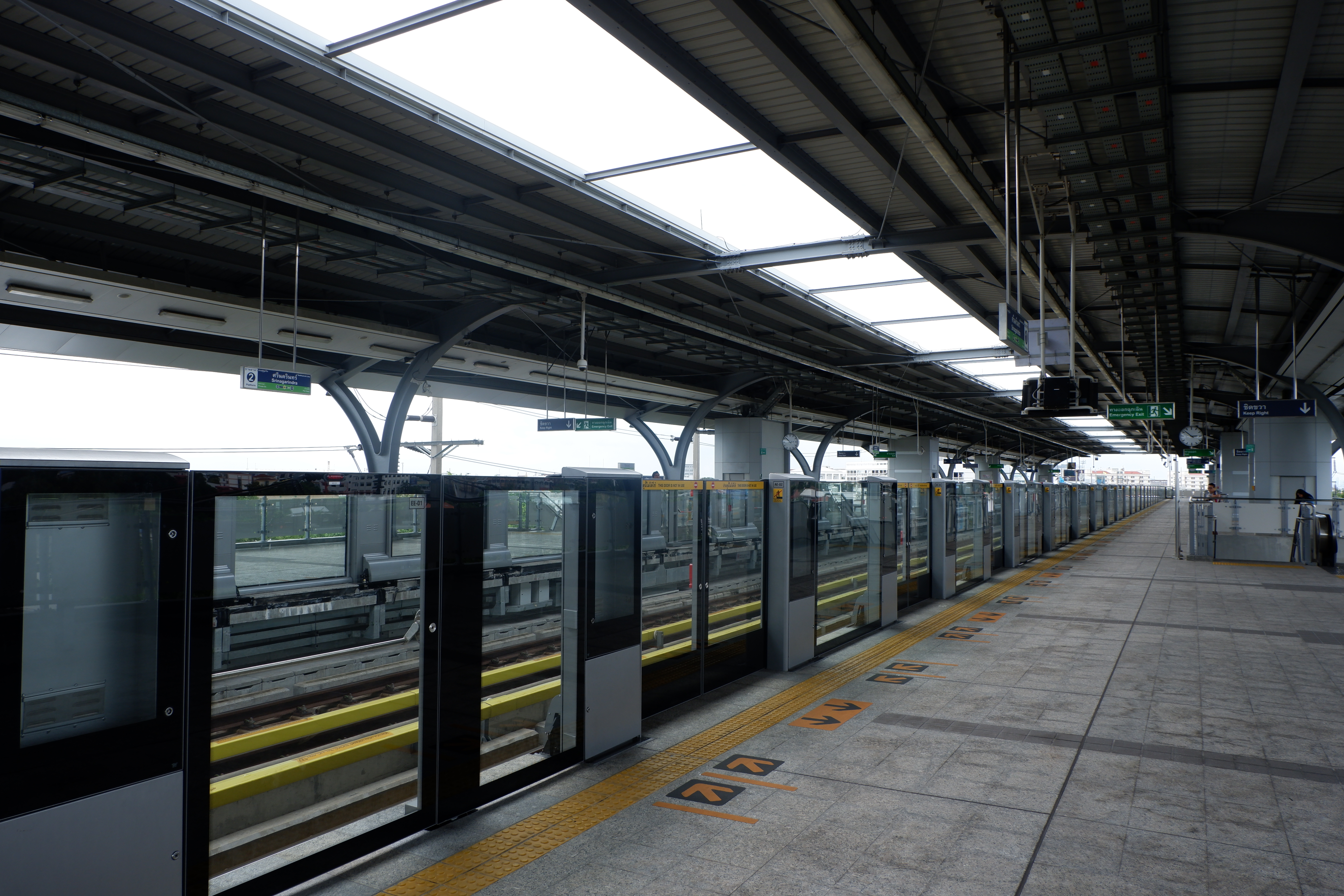

General information
- Location: Mueang Samut Prakan, Samut Prakan, Thailand
- Coordinates: 13.5922°N 100.6089°E
- System: BTS
- Owner: Bangkok Metropolitan Administration (BMA)
- Operator: Bangkok Mass Transit System; Public Company Limited (BTSC)
- Line: Sukhumvit Line

Other information
- Station code: E20

History
- Opened: 6 December 2018

Passengers
- 2021: 472,787

Services
Preceding station	BTS Skytrain	Following station
Pak Nam towards Khu Khot	Sukhumvit Line	Phraek Sa towards Kheha
Location

Srinagarindra Station sign

Srinagarindra (Thai: ศรีนครินทร์, RTGS: Sathani Si Nakharin) is a BTS Skytrain station, on the Sukhumvit Line in Samut Prakan Province, Thailand. It is located at the southern end of Srinagarindra Road.

It opened on 6 December 2018 as part of the 13 km eastern extension. Rides on the extension were free until April 16, 2019.

== See also ==
- Bangkok Skytrain
