= Sai Luat Road =

Road in Thailand

Coordinates: 13°35′21.7″N 100°35′51.9″E

Sai Luat Road (Thai: ถนนสายลวด, RTGS: Thanon Sai Luat, pronounced [tʰā.nǒn sǎːj lûa̯t]) is a road in the area of Mueang Samut Prakan District, Samut Prakan Province, Bangkok Metropolitan Region.

It is a short road, 1.85 km (1.1 mi) long. There is a starting point by separating itself from Sukhumvit Road (Highway 3) (km 28.860) in Samut Prakan Municipality up till ends at the Wongwian Thai Ban circle, where it merge with Khlong Ta Khed Fang Tawan Tok, Dan Kao, Prakhon Chai and Thai Ban Roads.

The name "Sai Luat" literally translates to "wire" owing it was the place where the first telegraph poles were installed in Thailand in 1875, corresponding to the King Rama V's reign, a total of 721 towers were installed between Bangkok and Samut Prakan. A total distance of 45 km (28.0 mi), operated by the Ministry of Defense (Krom Kalahom in those days).

The Sukhumvit Line BTS Station, Sai Luat (E22) gets its name from the road, because it is located near the starting point.

Originally, Sai Luat Road was under the supervision of the Department of Highways as Highway 3115 (หลวงแผ่นดินหมายเลข 3115) but now all distances have been transferred to the administration of Samut Prakan Municipality and downgraded to local road.

== See also ==
- Thai highway network
