= Sai Luat BTS station =

One of the Bangkok Skytrain stations on Skukhumvit line

Sai Luat สายลวด
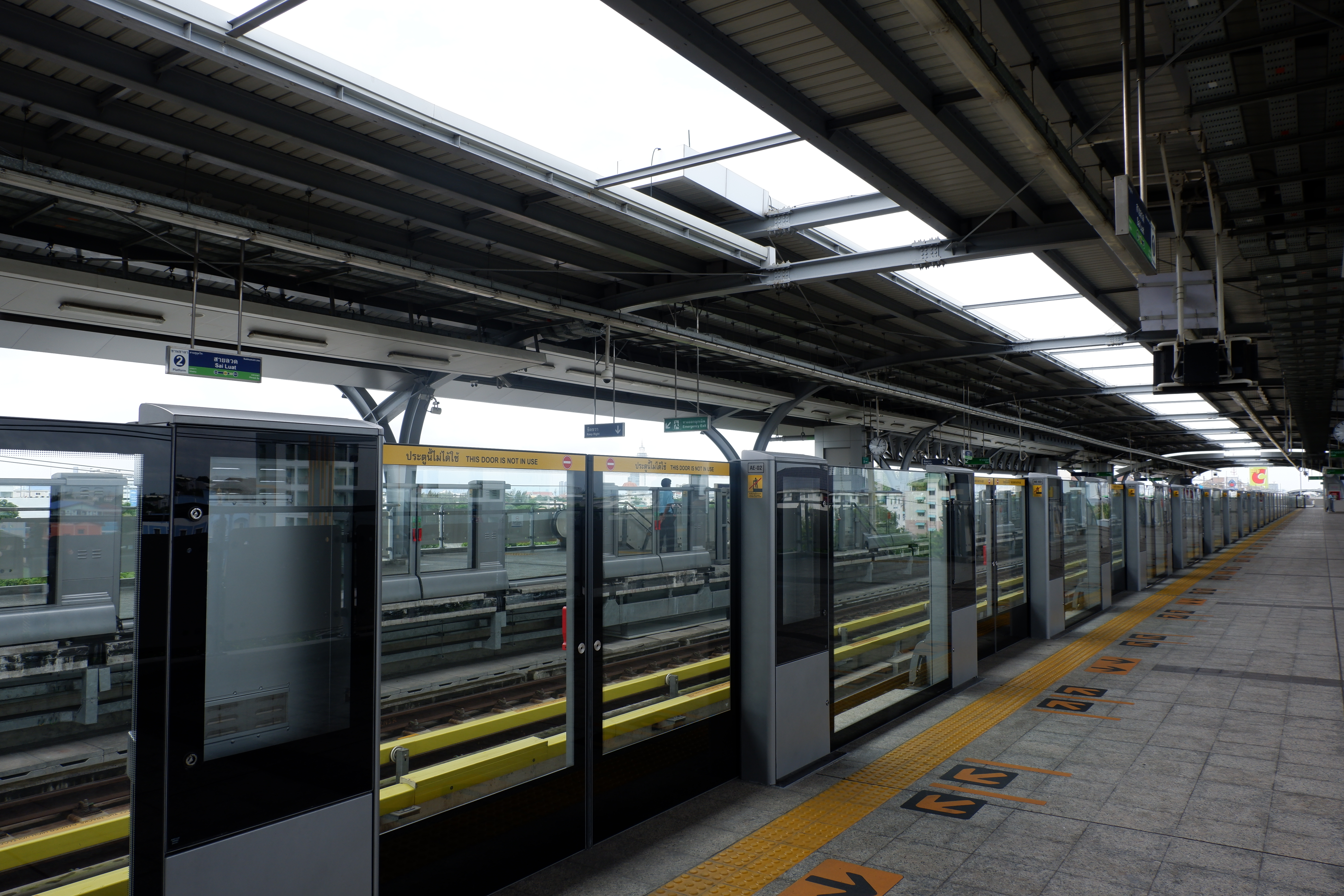

General information
- Location: Mueang Samut Prakan, Samut Prakan, Thailand
- Coordinates: 13°34′39″N 100°36′19″E
- System: BTS
- Owner: Bangkok Metropolitan Administration (BMA)
- Operator: Bangkok Mass Transit System; Public Company Limited (BTSC)
- Line: Sukhumvit Line

Other information
- Station code: E22

History
- Opened: 6 December 2018

Passengers
- 2021: 280,772

Services
Preceding station	BTS Skytrain	Following station
Phraek Sa towards Khu Khot	Sukhumvit Line	Kheha Terminus
Location

Sai Luat Station Traditional sign

Sai Luat station (Thai: สถานีสายลวด, pronounced [sā.tʰǎː.nīː sǎːj lûat]) is a BTS Skytrain station, on the Sukhumvit Line in Samut Prakan Province, Thailand.

It opened on 6 December 2018 as part of the 13 km eastern extension. Rides on the extension were free until April 16, 2019.

== See also ==
- Bangkok Skytrain
