= Khu Khot BTS station =

Rapid transit station in Bangkok

Khu Khot คูคต
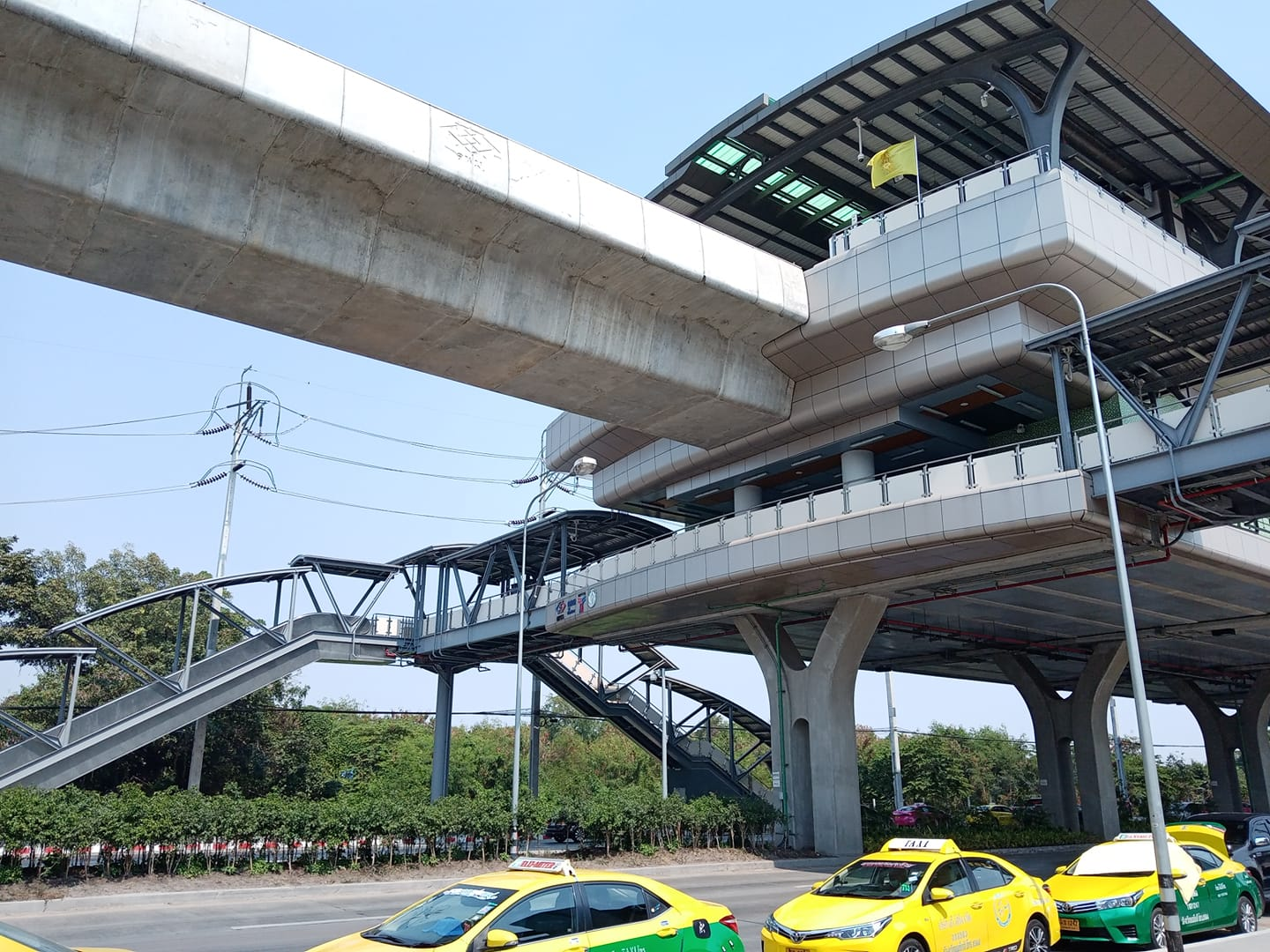

General information
- Location: Lam Luk Ka district Pathum Thani; Thailand
- Coordinates: 13.9324°N 100.6466°E
- System: BTS
- Owner: Bangkok Metropolitan Administration (BMA)
- Operator: Bangkok Mass Transit System; Public Company Limited (BTSC)
- Line: Sukhumvit Line
- Platforms: 2 side platforms
- Tracks: 2

Construction
- Parking: Park & Ride Building
- Accessible: Yes

Other information
- Station code: N24

History
- Opened: 16 December 2020
- Electrified: Third rail 750 V DC

Passengers
- 2021: 1,599,049

Services
Preceding station	BTS Skytrain	Following station
Terminus	Sukhumvit Line	Yaek Kor Por Aor towards Kheha
Location

Khu Khot Station Traditional sign

Khu Khot Station (Thai: สถานีคูคต, pronounced [sā.tʰǎː.nīː kʰūː kʰót]) is a BTS Skytrain station, on the Sukhumvit Line in Pathum Thani Province, Thailand. The station is part of the northern extension of the Sukhumvit Line and opened on 16 December 2020, as part of phase 4. It is currently the only BTS station located in the province.

== Station layout ==
U3; Platform	Side platform, doors will open on the left
U3; Platform	Platform 1	Sukhumvit Line toward Kheha (Yaek Kor Por Aor)
U3; Platform	Platform 2	Sukhumvit Line termination platform
U3; Platform	Side platform, doors will open on the left
U2 ticket sales class	ticket sales floor	Exit 1–4, Passenger Service Center; Ticket Office, Ticket Machine, Shop, Park & Ride Building
G Street level	-	Bus Stop, Khu Khot Police Station, Park & Ride Building

== Exits ==
- Exit 1: Opposite of Khu Khot Police Station (escalator)
- Exit 2: Park & Ride building (escalator, elevator)
- Exit 3: Soi Sunee (elevator)
- Exit 4: Opposite of Soi Sunee, Wat Sai Mai

== See also ==
- Bangkok Skytrain
