= Kheha BTS station =

Kheha เคหะฯ
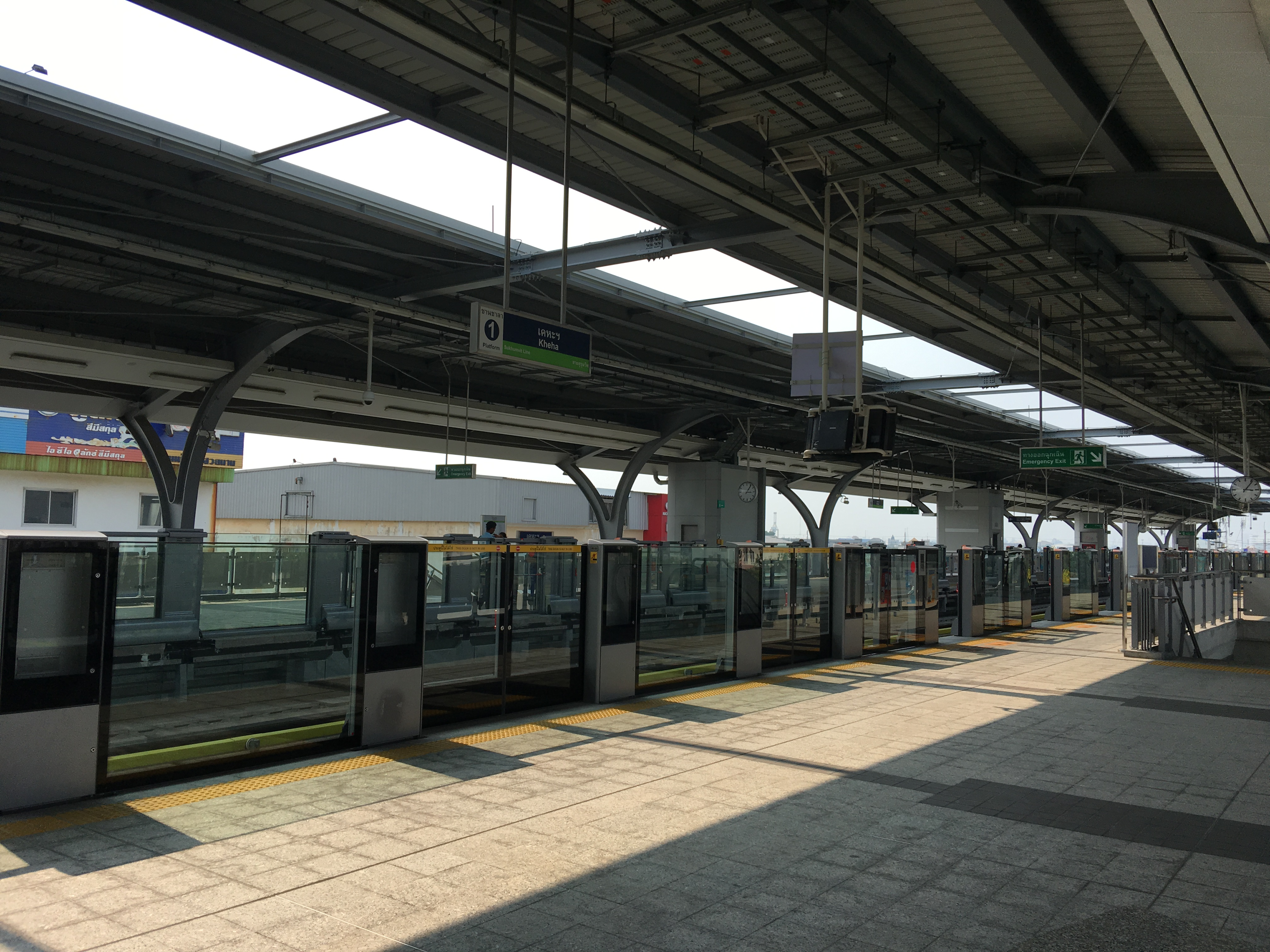

General information
- Location: Mueang Samut Prakan, Samut Prakan, Thailand
- Coordinates: 13.5677°N 100.6077°E
- System: BTS
- Owner: Bangkok Metropolitan Administration (BMA)
- Operator: Bangkok Mass Transit System; Public Company Limited (BTSC)
- Line: Sukhumvit Line

Other information
- Station code: E23

History
- Opened: 6 December 2018
- Former names: Kan Kheha Haeng Chat; Kheha Samut Prakan

Passengers
- 2021: 1,115,896

Services
Preceding station	BTS Skytrain	Following station
Sai Luat towards Khu Khot	Sukhumvit Line	Terminus
Location

Kheha Station Traditional sign

Kheha (Thai: สถานีเคหะฯ, pronounced [sā.tʰǎː.nīː kʰēː.hàʔ]) is a BTS Skytrain station, on the Sukhumvit Line in Samut Prakan, Thailand. It is the current eastern terminus of the line. The station was opened on 6 December 2018 as part of the 13-km eastern extension. Rides on the extension were free until 2 January 2024. A further extension to Bang Pu is planned.

== History ==
In official proposals, the station was initially named Kheha Samut Prakan due to its location next to the Samut Prakan Housing Project (Thai: การเคหะสมุทรปราการ; Kan Kheha Samut Prakan).

The name Kan Kheha Haeng Chat (Thai: การเคหะแห่งชาติ; 'National Housing Project') was also suggested. However, this led to confusion due to the large number of housing projects within the Bangkok Metropolitan Region. The Royal Society of Thailand ultimately requested the Mass Rapid Transit Authority of Thailand to shorten the name to simply Kheha for ease of use.

== See also ==
- Bangkok Skytrain
