= BTS Skytrain =

Elevated rapid transit system in Bangkok, Thailand

The Elevated Train in Commemoration of HM the King's 6th Cycle Birthday

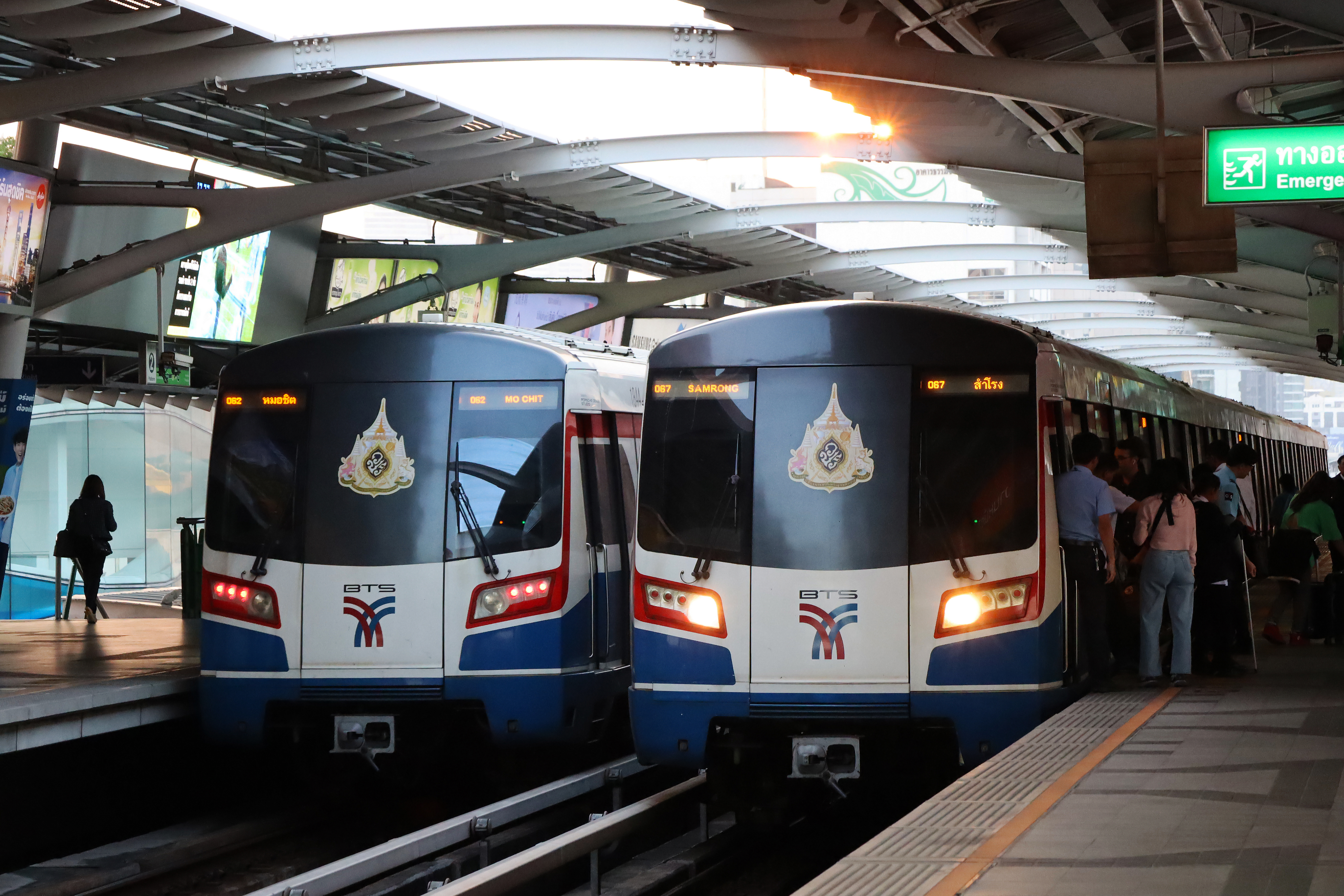
- Two CNR Changchun EMU-B1 at Ekkamai station.

Overview
- Native name: Bangkok Mass Transit System
- Owner: Bangkok Metropolitan Administration (BMA)
- Area served: Bangkok Metropolitan Region
- Locale: Bangkok, Thailand
- Transit type: Rapid transit People Mover
- Number of lines: 3
- Number of stations: 64
- Daily ridership: 723,167 ( BTS and BTS ) 7,550 ( MRL ) 2024
- Website: www.bts.co.th/eng/index.html

Operation
- Began operation: 5 December 1999; 26 years ago
- Operator: Bangkok Mass Transit System; Public Company Limited
- Character: Fully elevated
- Number of vehicles: BTS & BTS; Siemens Modular Metro; EMU-A1 : 35 four-car trains Siemens - Bozankaya; EMU-A2 : 22 four-car trains CNR Changchun; EMU-B1 : 12 four-car trains EMU-B2 : 5 four-car trains CRRC Changchun; EMU-B3 : 24 four-car trains MRL; Alstom Innovia APM 300; 3 two-car trains
- Headway: 2.40 - 6.00 mins ( BTS ) 3.45 - 6.00 mins ( BTS ) 8.00 - 15.00 mins ( MRL )

Technical
- System length: 70.05 km (43.53 mi) (operational); 36.84 km (22.89 mi) (planned); 106.89 km (66.42 mi) (total)
- Track gauge: 1,435 mm (4 ft 8 1/2 in) standard gauge
- Electrification: 750 V DC third rail
- Average speed: 35 km/h (22 mph)
- Top speed: 80 km/h (50 mph)

The Bangkok Mass Transit System, commonly known as the BTS Skytrain (Thai: รถไฟฟ้าบีทีเอส RTGS: rot fai fa [BTS]), is an elevated rapid transit system in Bangkok, Thailand. It is operated by Bangkok Mass Transit System PCL (BTSC), a subsidiary of BTS Group Holdings, under a concession granted by the Bangkok Metropolitan Administration (BMA) which owns the lines. The system consists of 62 stations along three lines with a combined route length of 70.05 kilometers (43.53 mi). The BTS Sukhumvit Line runs northwards and south-eastwards, terminating at Khu Khot and Kheha respectively. The BTS Silom Line which serves Silom and Sathon Roads, the central business district of Bangkok, terminates at National Stadium and Bang Wa. The Gold Line people mover runs from Krung Thon Buri to Klong San and serves Iconsiam. The lines interchange at Siam station and Krung Thon Buri. The system is formally known as "The Elevated Train in Commemoration of HM the King's 6th Cycle Birthday" (รถไฟฟ้าเฉลิมพระเกียรติ 6 รอบ พระชนมพรรษา).

Besides the three BTS lines, Bangkok's rapid transit system includes the underground and elevated Mass Rapid Transit (MRT) lines, the Bus Rapid Transit System (BRT), and the elevated Airport Rail Link (ARL), serving several stations before reaching Suvarnabhumi Airport, and the SRT Red Lines of the State Railway of Thailand.

== History ==
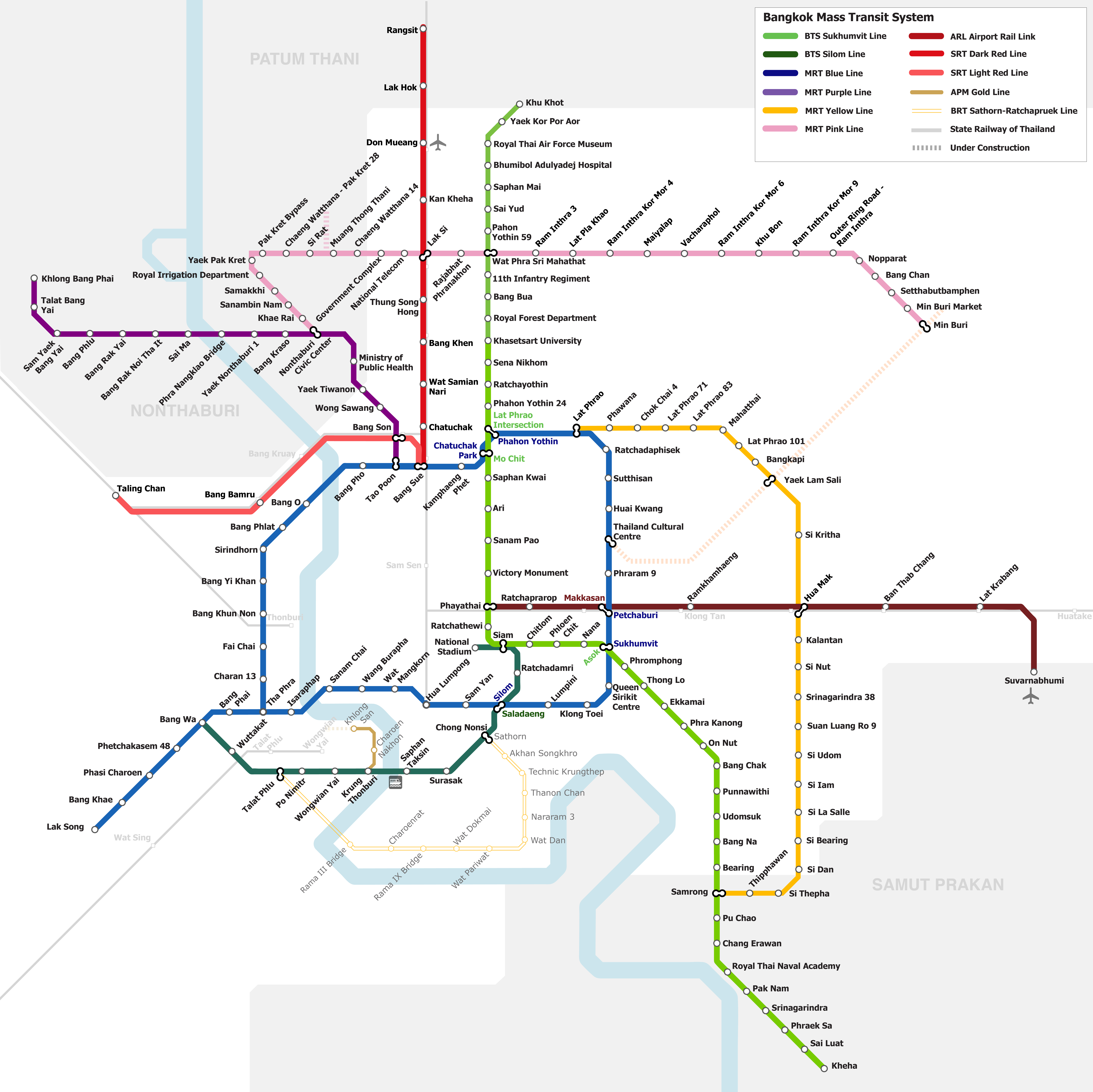
Map of Bangkok urban transit systems

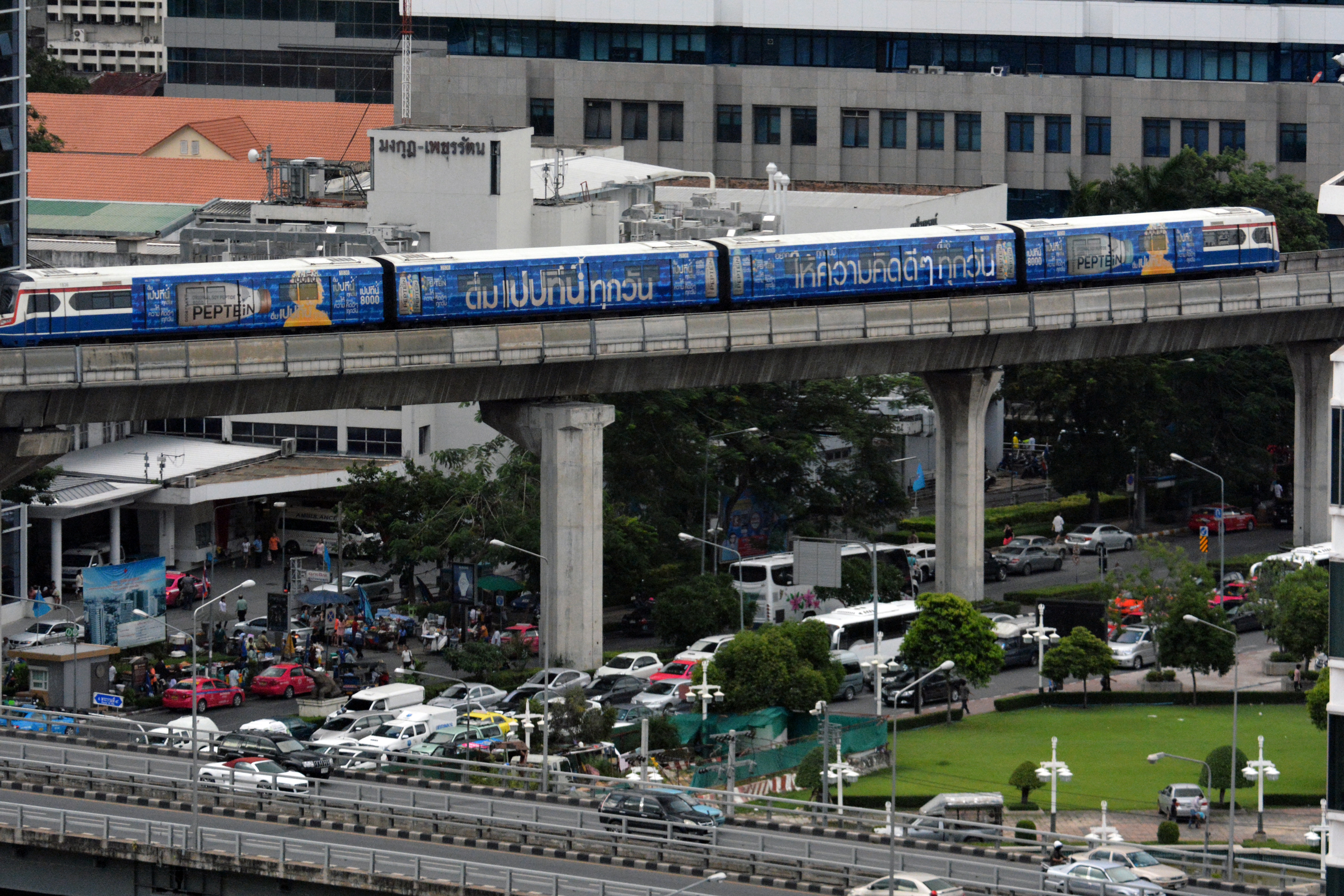
Skytrain departing Sala Daeng station

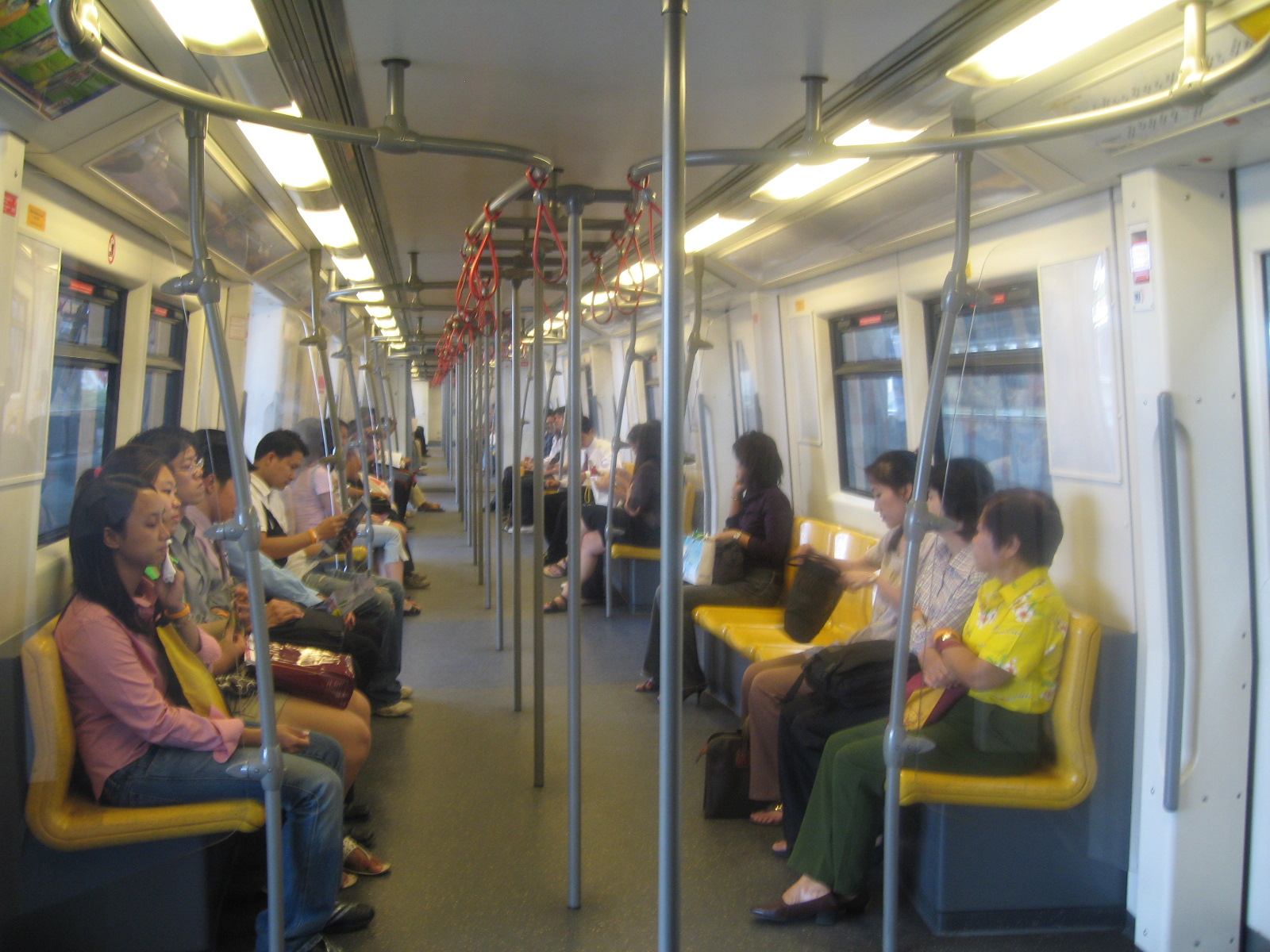
Interior of a train

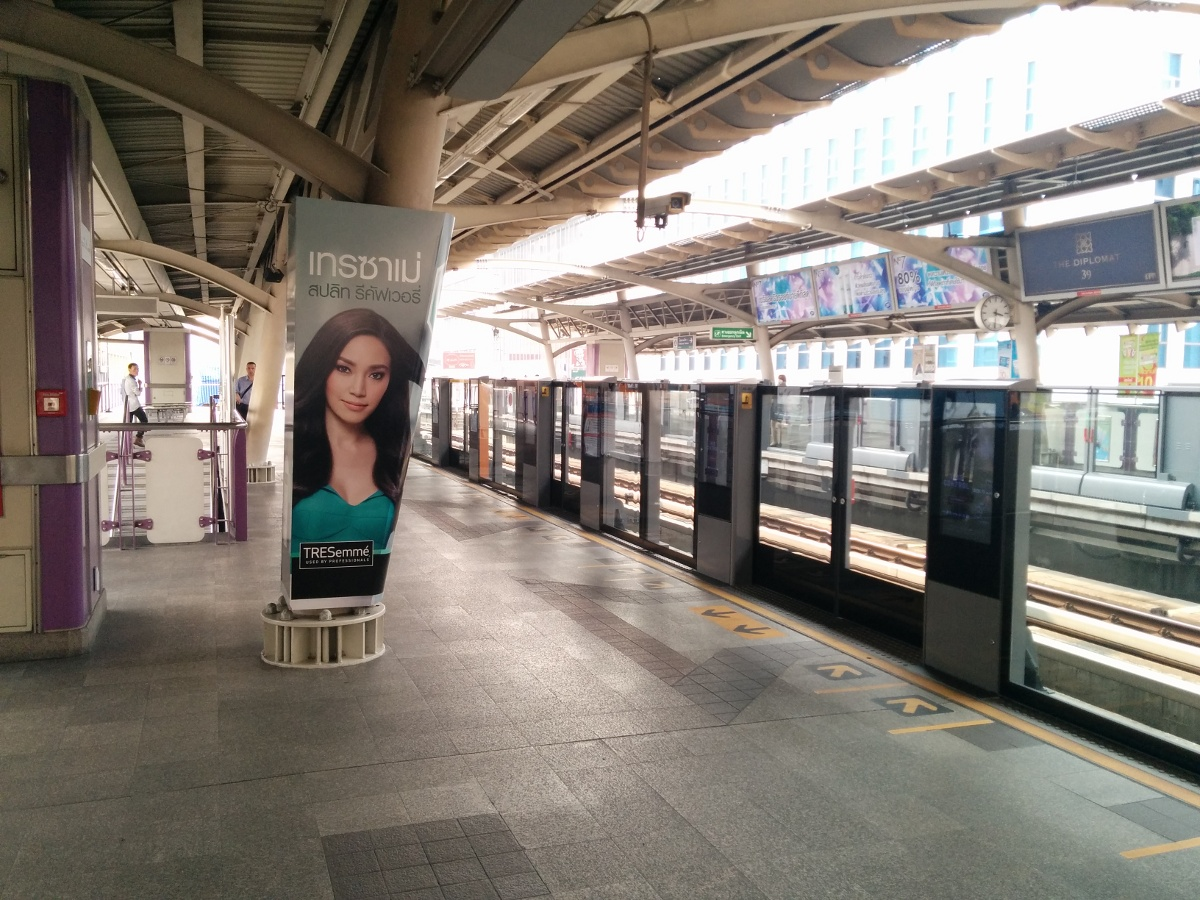
A typical BTS station platform, showing platform screen doors

Plans for mass transit in Bangkok began in the early 1980s. An early version of the Skytrain project was known as the Lavalin Skytrain because it was designed using the Vancouver SkyTrain as a model, adopting technology developed by SNC-Lavalin. Due to political interference, the concession with Lavalin was cancelled in June 1992, despite Bangkok's chronic traffic congestion. The Thai government focused on increasing road and expressway infrastructure in an attempt to reduce congestion. This had little impact, as the number of cars on the road continued to increase dramatically. The routes considered as part of the Skytrain project would become the basis for the MRT system and are mainly underground. In the early 1990s, foundations and a viaduct for the Lavalin Skytrain were constructed in the middle of the Phra Pok Klao Bridge across the Chao Phraya River. The viaduct was redeveloped into a sky park in June 2020.

Another abortive attempt at building an elevated rail network was the Bangkok Elevated Road and Train System (BERTS), which was terminated in 1998 after only 13.77 percent had been completed.

Shortly after it became clear that the Lavalin Skytrain had stalled, then-Governor Major General Chamlong Srimuang asked his deputy, Captain Kritsada Arunwong na Ayutthaya, to create a new feeder system with a route along Sukhumvit and Silom Roads. Krisda and his team from the Bangkok Metropolitan Administration (BMA) succeeded in finding a private investor. Krisda also convinced everyone concerned to allow the city supervise the project. Keeree Kanjanapas founded the Bangkok Transit System Corporation (BTSC) and it successfully financed the system and grew it from a feeder system to a full mass transit project. Thanayong Public Company Limited Thai: บริษัท ธนายง จำกัด (มหาชน)) had a 28 percent stake in BTSC when the Skytrain began, and therefore in its early days the system was sometimes referred to as the "Thanayong Skytrain".

Siemens, the supplier of the railway technology, and the Thai contractor, Italian Thai Development, built the system for BTSC. The "Skytrain" name was bestowed later by the press following the Vancouver example where the elevated metro had been named "Skytrain". Originally, the Skytrain depot was to be built underneath Lumphini Park, but due to widespread objections from Bangkok residents it was constructed on a parcel of land on Phahonyothin Road, replacing the old northern/northeastern bus terminal (Mo Chit). The current depot at Mo Chit is part of the proposed "Bangkok Terminal" project, where a large complex composed of a new regional bus terminal, park and ride facility, and other commercial development can be built directly above it.

The Skytrain system was opened on 5 December 1999 by Princess Maha Chakri Sirindhorn. It initially had lower-than-predicted ridership, with 200,000 passenger trips per day. Ticket revenue was only enough to meet the trains' operating cost, and not sufficient to service construction loans. The Skytrain's daily passenger numbers have steadily increased since then. On 9 December 2005, more than 500,000 single trips were made on the Skytrain on a single day for the first time. By September 2012, the Skytrain served around 600,000 passengers on an average day, increasing to 650,000 on an average weekday in 2013. A record 760,000 passengers traveled on Sunday, 22 December 2013, a day of mass political protest in Bangkok. The normal Sunday average is 400,000 passengers. The BTS had a fleet of 52 four-car trains (208 carriages) by 2017. 46 new four-car trains (184 carriages) were ordered to address growing capacity requirements of the existing lines to cater for the Sukhumvit Line extensions south to Kheha and north to Khu Khot. They were delivered from 2018 to 2020.

On 5 March 2020, the BTS made a song about the COVID-19 pandemic, as an antidote to the grim warnings about the coronavirus, showing the staff dancing and keeping hygiene.

== Station layout ==
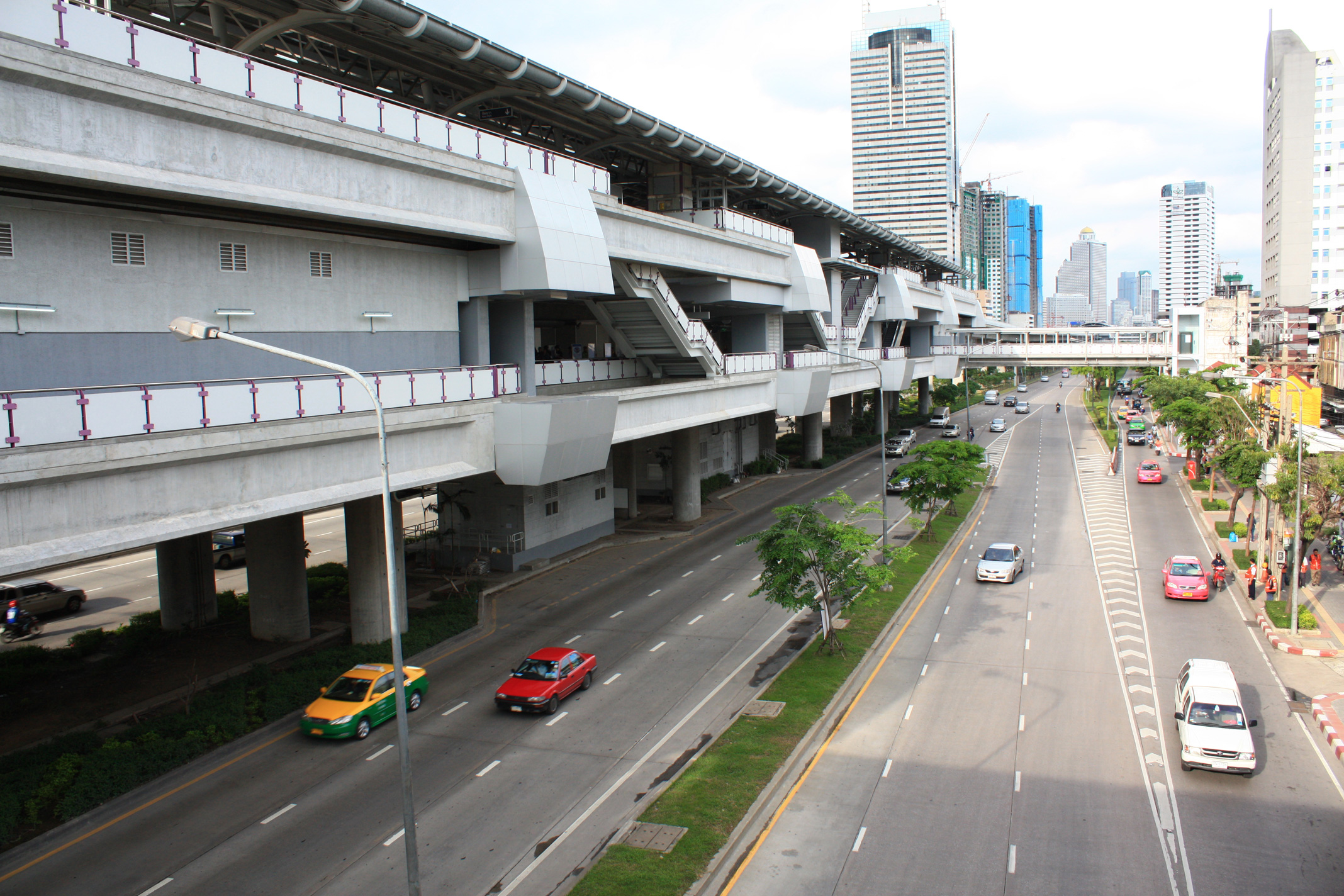
Exterior view of Wongwian Yai station

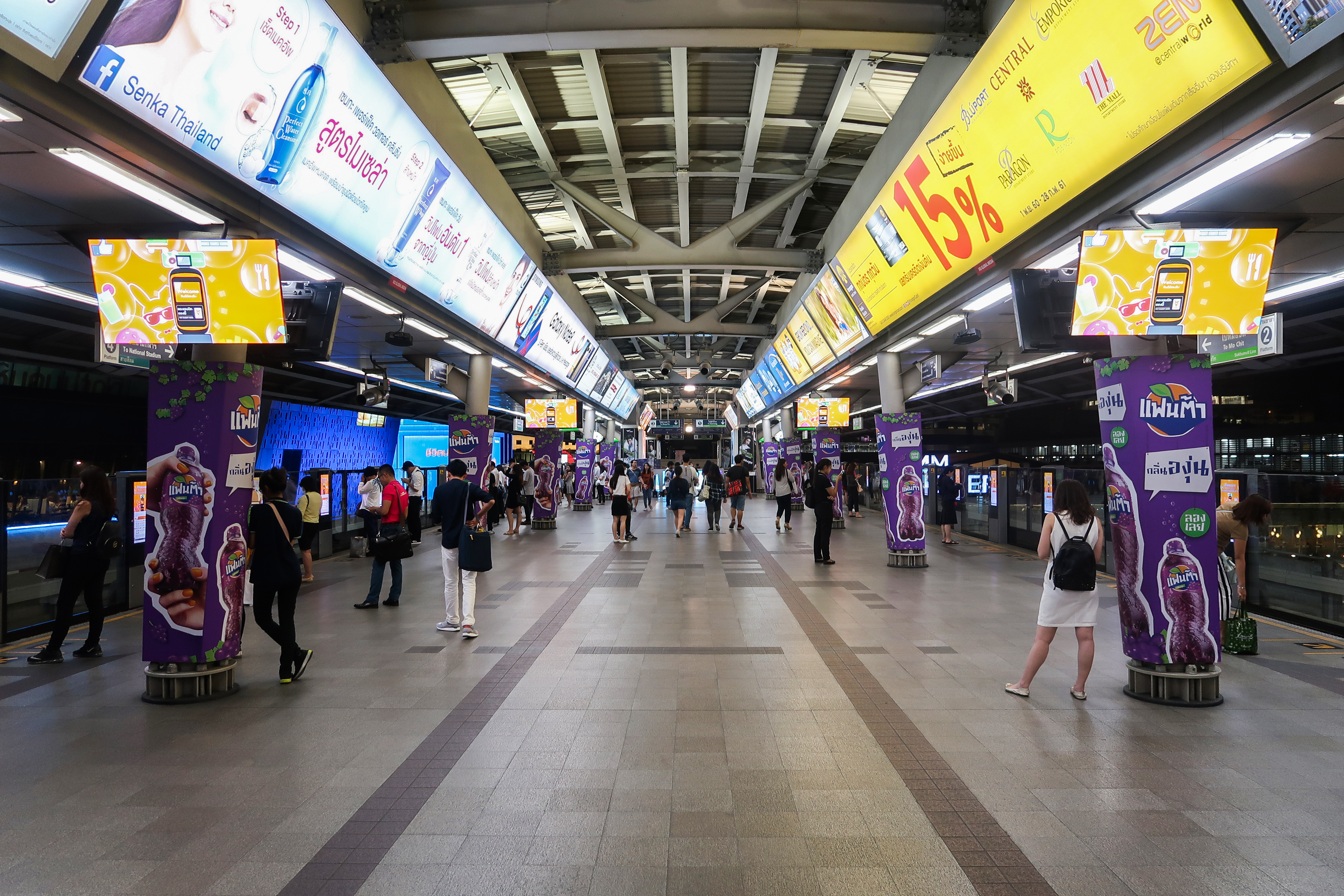
The upper platform at Siam interchange station, for north- and west-bound trains

The system's stations are all elevated and designed with three distinct levels. At street level, passengers can access the stations via stairs, escalators, and elevators. This level also typically houses supporting utility equipment like generators and water tanks, often situated on traffic islands.

The first elevated level houses the ticket booths, small kiosk-style shops, and fare gates. Passengers can reach the second level (or the third level in the case of Siam station) using stairs, elevators and escalators. This level is dedicated to the platforms and rails. Most stations adopt a side platform layout, with the notable exceptions of Siam Station, Ha Yaek Lat Phrao Station, and Samrong, which utilize island platforms. Siam Station features island platforms to enable easy cross-platform interchange between the two lines of the system. Saphan Taksin uses a unique single-track side platform layout due to space constraints.

The platform design accommodates the precise positioning of train doors, with equal distances between doors in all cars. Markings on the platform indicate where the doors will align once the train stops. Although the platforms are constructed to support six-car trains, currently, only four-car trains are operational. For added safety and assistance, security personnel are stationed at every platform and in the ticketing halls.

The Skytrain system in Thailand features five key stations – Sala Daeng, Asok, Ha Yaek Lat Phrao, Bang Wa, and Mo Chit – that serve as interchanges with the Metropolitan Rapid Transit (MRT) system. Additionally, the Saphan Taksin station is conveniently connected to the adjacent Sathon Pier, which is a stop for the Chao Phraya Express Boat services. Many of these stations are also connected to nearby buildings and public amenities through skybridges, providing easy and convenient access for pedestrians.

Since 2014, platform screen doors (half size) have been installed in several stations including On Nut, Phrom Phong, Asok, Chit Lom, Siam, Thong Lor, Phaya Thai, Victory Monument, Sala Daeng, Chong Nonsi and Surasak. However, it's noteworthy that the installation process has not been without issues. For instance, the installation at Phrom Phong station in December 2013 led to a software problem, resulting in a six-hour shutdown of all BTS services. This shutdown caused significant traffic congestion in the city.

== Fares ==
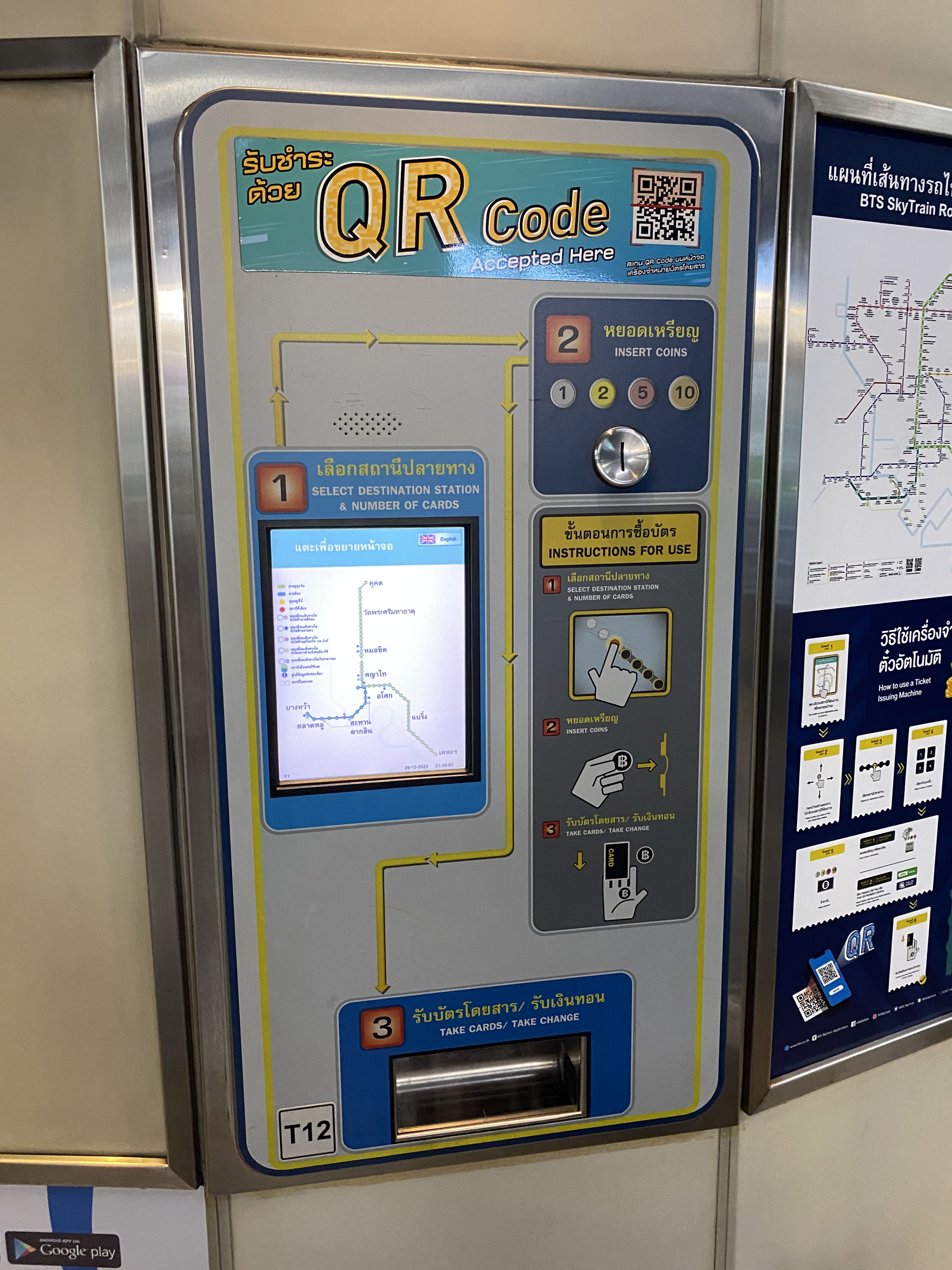
Ticketing machine at Ari station.

Fares are determined by distance.

Passengers can purchase single-journey tickets from ticket machines at all stations. These tickets are tapped at the fares gates to enter and inserted at the fare gates to exit, where they are retained. Additionally, passengers can purchase single-journey tickets to any station on the MRT Pink Line and MRT Yellow Line. This is possible because Wat Phra Si Mahathat station has paid-area integration between the Sukhumvit Line and the MRT Pink Line. At Samrong station, passengers transferring between the Sukhumvit Line and the MRT Yellow Line must insert their single-journey ticket into the fare gates. The fare gates will then return the ticket, which passengers can tap at the other fare gates to continue their journey.

In 2007, the BTS Smartpass was introduced. The BTS Smartpass was a stored-value card that could be used to travel across the BTS Skytrain network.

In 2012, the BTS Smartpass was replaced by the Rabbit Card. The Rabbit Card is a more advanced stored-value card, not only covering fares for the BTS and the Bus Rapid Transit (BRT), but also functioning as a payment method for various restaurants, stores and services associated with the BTS.

The Rabbit Card is not compatible with any other rail or bus network in Bangkok, such as the MRT or SRT. In contrast, these rail networks accept EMV (Europay, Mastercard, and Visa) contactless payment, allowing passengers to use their credit or debit cards directly at the fare gates. The Mangmoom Card, designed for use across multiple rail and bus networks, has experienced several delays. Originally planned for a 2015 launch, it is not yet valid for use on the BTS Skytrain as of 2026.

== BTS Network ==
At its opening, the BTS had 23 stations on its two lines: 17 on the Sukhumvit Line and 7 on the Silom Line, with both lines interchanging at Siam. Since then, 30 additional stations have opened on the Sukhumvit Line and 6 on the Silom Line, with the latest new three stations at Gold Line.

Line Name	Commencement	Last Extension	Next Extension	Terminus		Length (km)	Stations
Rapid Transit
Sukhumvit Line	5 December 1999; 26 years ago	16 December 2020; 5 years ago	TBA	Khu Khot	Kheha	53.58 km (33.29 mi)	47
Silom Line	5 December 1999; 26 years ago	8 February 2021; 5 years ago	TBA	National Stadium	Bang Wa	14.67 km (9.12 mi)	14
People Mover
Gold Line	16 December 2020; 5 years ago	–	TBA	Krung Thon Buri	Khlong San	1.80 km (1.12 mi)	3
Total						70.05 km (43.53 mi)	64

== BTS route extensions ==
In 2002, the cabinet of then Prime Minister Thaksin Shinawatra amended laws in order to allow private firms to finance the cost of operating the train system, while the government would undertake civil engineering works to build new extensions.

Timeline of BTS openings

- 5 December 1999 Sukhumvit Line: Mo Chit – On Nut; Silom Line: National Stadium – Saphan Taksin
- 15 May 2009 Silom Line: Saphan Taksin (S6) – Wongwian Yai (S8)
- 12 August 2011 Sukhumvit Line: On Nut (E9) – Bearing (E14)
- 12 January 2013 Silom Line: Wongwian Yai (S8) – Pho Nimit (S9)
- 14 February 2013 Silom Line: Pho Nimit (S9) – Talat Phlu (S10)
- 5 December 2013 Silom Line: Talat Phlu (S10) – Bang Wa (S12)
- 3 April 2017 Sukhumvit Line: Bearing (E14) – Samrong (E15)
- 6 December 2018 Sukhumvit Line: Samrong (E15) – Kheha (E23)
- 9 August 2019 Sukhumvit Line: Mo Chit (N8) – Ha Yaek Lat Phrao (N9)
- 4 December 2019 Sukhumvit Line: Ha Yaek Lat Phrao (N9) – Kasetsart University (N13)
- 5 June 2020 Sukhumvit Line: Kasetsart University (N13) – Wat Phra Sri Mahathat (N17)
- 16 December 2020 Sukhumvit Line: Wat Phra Sri Mahathat (N17) – Khu Khot (N24)
- 8 February 2021 Silom Line: Saint Louis (S4, infill station)

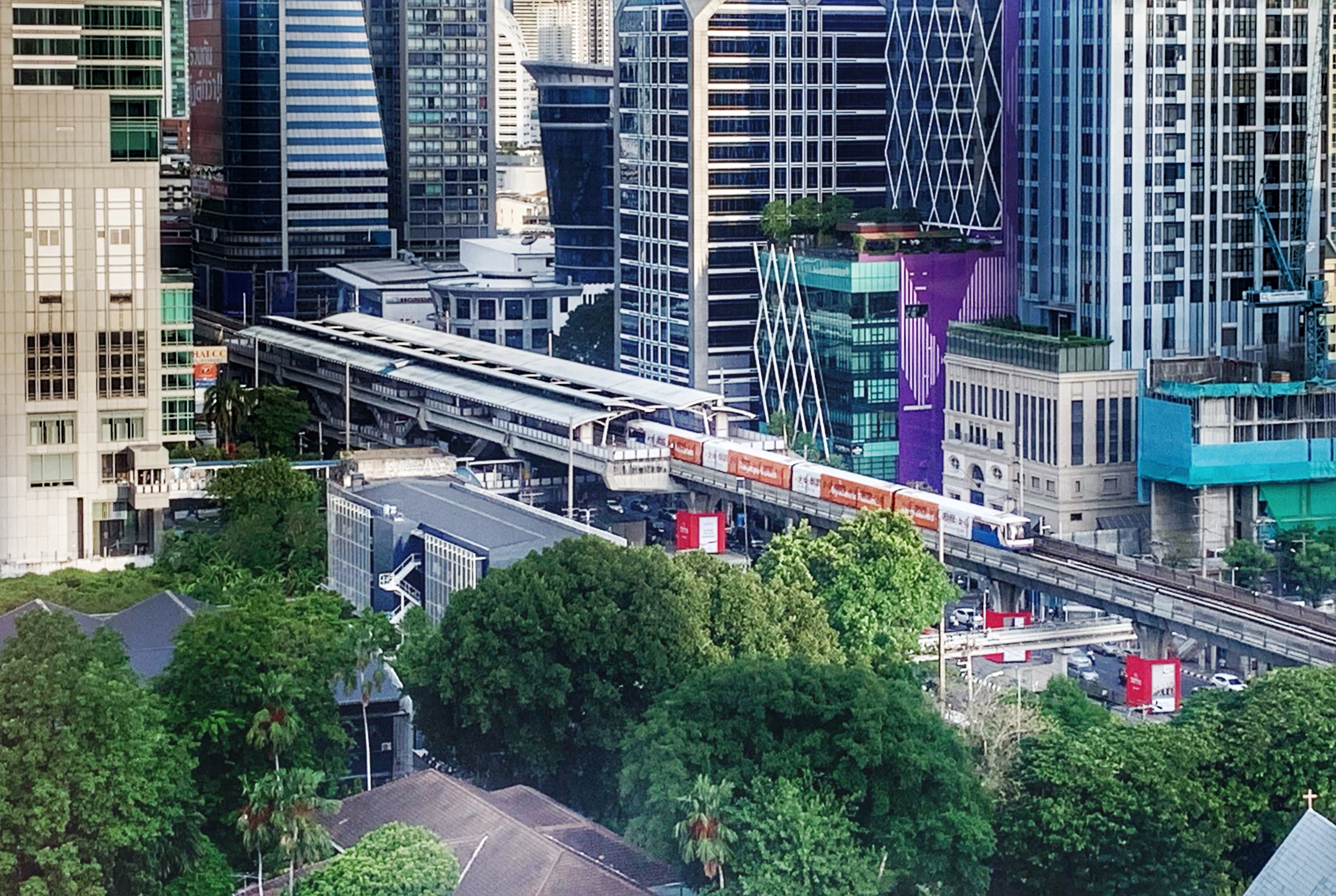
The Surasak BTS station passes through Sathon, a business district of Bangkok.

=== 1st extension – Silom Line south to Wongwian Yai (2009) ===
On 18 October 2005, with no approval from the central government forthcoming, Bangkok Metropolitan Administration (BMA) decided to fund and complete the 2.2 kilometers (1.4 mi) Silom Line route extension to Krung Thon Buri Station (S7) and Wongwian Yai Station (S8). Construction began on 13 December 2005 with completion originally expected within two years. However, problems with the tendering and installation of a new Bombardier open signalling system repeatedly pushed back the schedule. The extension finally opening on 15 May 2009. However, the single platform Saphan Taksin station which has only one track, has caused repeated delays during rush hour. In 2012, the BMA announced plans to demolish Saphan Taksin station in the future. There are now plans to construct new platforms and remove the bottleneck and keep the station which provides an important link between river boats. The plan includes redesigning the road bridges either side of the viaduct to fit the new station.

=== 2nd extension – Sukhumvit Line east to Bearing (2011) ===
A second extension, the 5.25 km On Nut station (E9) to Bearing station (E14) started construction in August 2006. The 4 billion baht extension was again funded by the BMA. The original scheduled opening date was mid-2009. However, an unusual, prolonged delay in the tendering of the contract for the electrical and signals resulted in a two-year delay. "The senior City Hall official responsible for making the purchase has apparently stalled the scheme over fears of being investigated if something went wrong with the purchase."

The BTSC was contracted by the BMA to run the extension. Subsequently, the extension did not open until over two years later on 12 August 2011. The delay in opening prompted the BMA to offer free travel for this extension until the end of 2011 as compensation. A flat fare separate from the distance based fare normal in the BTS network was then charged for this section. However, distance based fares are now used for this extension.

=== 3rd extension – Silom Line south to Bang Wa (2013) ===
The third extension to the network, a 5.3 km, four station extension from Wongwian Yai (S8) to Bang Wa (S12) in Phasi Charoen District began construction in the 2nd quarter of 2011 with a deadline of the end of 2012. Only the stations had to be constructed as the viaduct had been completed some years prior. However, construction was delayed for many months by the 2011 Thailand floods. It eventually opened in stages. Pho Nimit opened on 12 January 2013, Talat Phlu opened on 14 February 2013, with the last two stations opening on 5 December 2013. For most of 2013, passengers changed platforms and trains at Wongwian Yai for a shuttle service to S09 and S10 as there was no turnout at S10 for through trains. Since the opening of the final section of the extension to Bang Wa station on 5 December 2013, this is no longer the case.

=== 4th extension – Sukhumvit Line east to Kheha (2017-2018) ===
Construction started in April 2012 for a 12.6 km (7.8 mi), seven station extension from Bearing station (E14) to Samut Prakan Station (E23). The extension is being built by Ch. Karnchang. Two stations (E18 & E22) will be built at a later date. The extension was funded by the MRTA as it is outside BMA city limits. The extension was planned to open in 2017. In April 2013, the MRTA awarded Ch Karnchang the contract for track laying and electrical systems. Construction was completed in 2017, but arguments over who should operate the line delayed the opening. One station, Samrong opened earlier, on 3 April 2017. The full extension opened on 6 December 2018 and the BTSC has announced that the free travel concession on this section will continue until the new train sets arrive to allow for the new section to be fully functional.

=== 5th extension – Sukhumvit Line north to Khu Khot (2019-2020) ===
- 1) Mo Chit station to Saphan Mai: 11.4 km, 12 stations (N9–N20).
- 2) Saphan Mai to Khu Khot: 7.5 km, four stations (N21-N24).

An 11.4 km, 12 station northern extension from Mo Chit station to Saphan Mai in Don Mueang District has been planned since the Sukhumvit Line opened. Originally, this extension was scheduled to be completed by 2008. However, due to a combination of changes in government, a prolonged environmental study, and problems with locating a suitable train depot, the extension has been continually delayed.

A further 16.5 km, nine station extension from Saphan Mai to Lam Lukka was also planned once the extension to Saphan Mai had been completed. This was subsequently split into two extensions. A 7.5 km, four station extension to Khu Khot and a 9 km, five station extension along Lam Luk Ka Road to Lam Luk Ka.

Due to the significant delay in the northern extension plans, in mid-2013 it was decided by the MRTA to tender extensions (1) & (2) at the same time by the end of 2013. However, the dissolution of parliament in November 2013 delayed this yet again. A tender was finally released in January 2014 with an April deadline before being delayed until late May 2014 due to concerns from bidders.

A military coup in late-May suspended the bidding process while the military administration reviewed all major projects. In late-June, the military administration affirmed the tender which will proceed before the end of 2014. In mid-August, the MRTA announced that the new tender deadline would be 30 September 2014. Five bidders qualified with successful bids to be announced by December. The contract to construct the line for both extensions (1) & (2) was finally signed in April 2015 and the full extension was scheduled to open in 2020.

Testing of the final 9.8 km, 7 station section from Wat Phra Sri Mahathat (N17) to Khu Khot (N24) began on 5 October and continued until the full extension opens. It was officially inaugurated on 16 December 2020 by the Prime Minister.

Opening dates

1. The first section to Ha Yaek Lat Phrao station (N9) opened on 9 August 2019;
2. the next 4 stations from Ha Yaek Lat Phrao station (N9) to Kasetsart University (N13) opened on 4 December 2019;
3. further 4 stations from Kasetsart University (N13) to Wat Phra Sri Mahathat (N17) opened on 5 June 2020;
4. the remaining section of 9.8 km and 7 stations from Wat Phra Sri Mahathat (N17) to Khu Khot (N24) opened on 16 December 2020.

=== Saint Louis (S4) infill station – Silom Line (2021) ===
In 2018, it was decided to finally build the missing Saint Louis BTS Station (S4) station (originally named Sueksa Wittaya), the EIA was finalised in March 2019. Construction of the station began in August 2019 and by the end of 2019 had reached 25% progress. By August 2020, construction had reached 50% but was 30% behind schedule due to COVID related delays.

The station opened on 8 February 2021.

== Future extension plans ==
BTS Group Holdings will tender to operate more BTS and MRT lines in the future through financing from its BTS Rail Mass Transit Growth Infrastructure Fund after it received approval from the Thai Securities and Exchange Commission in March 2013. The IPO raised US$2.1 billion, the largest in Thailand's history.

=== Sukhumvit Line, north ===
A further 9 km, five station extension from Khu Khot station to Wongwaen-Lam Luk Ka station is planned to be constructed by 2029.

=== Sukhumvit Line, east ===
- A further 7 km, five-station extension from Kheha station to Bang Pu station is planned to be constructed by 2029.
- A spur line from Bang Na to Suvarnabhumi Airport (terminating at future South Passenger Terminal of Suvarnabhumi Airport). However, this may also be built as a light rail.

=== Silom Line, south ===
After the opening of Wutthakat (S11) and Bang Wa (S12) stations 5 December 2013, the BMA announced a new proposal to further extended the Silom Line by 7 km from Bang Wa (S12) station, by six stations to Taling Chan. At Taling Chan it would connect with the SRT Light Red line.

A public hearing was held in 2015. Three route options were considered, with construction intended to start in 2017. Part of the basis for this further extension by the BMA is that it would provide proximate access to the Southern Bus Terminal. The BMA Transport and Traffic Office completed an economic evaluation of the extension in October 2018 which found a cost benefit ratio of 2.37. The study recommended that an EIA be completed in 2019 but this was delayed.

In 2022, Department of Rail Transport ("DRT") was announced that the Silom Line will be part of the new M-Map 2 action plan. This plan will be extended the Silom Line from Bang Wa (S12) to Bang Rak Noi Tha It (S23) on the Ratchaphruek road by 18 kilometers and 11 stations. The first part of the extension will be end at Taling Chan (S16) to connect with the SRT Light Red line. The second part of the extension will be end at Bang Rak Noi Tha It (S23) in Nonthaburi province to connect with the MRT Purple Line at current MRT station. In this extension, DRT proposed the new main depot to separate the system depot from the Sukhumvit Line. Which make the Silom Line will be completely standalone system. However, the extension will be start until the Saphan Taksin station (S6) was renovated into double track.

=== Silom Line, west ===
The Silom Line is planned to be extended by one or two stations west along Rama 1 from National Stadium (W1) to link with the SRT Dark Red Line at Yot Se station. However, no time frame for this extension has been announced and this section of the SRT Dark Red Line will not be built until after 2022.

Originally, the plan was to extend the Silom Line west from National Stadium into Chinatown, then north to Democracy Monument where it would then run west to Rattanakosin Island and Sanam Luang, tunnel under the river to the Thonburi side before terminating at Phran Nok. However, this plan was shelved in 2009 and much of this route has been replaced by routing changes to the planned MRT Orange Line.

Future plans
Line Name	Name	Planned opening date	Terminus		Length (km)	Stations	Status
Rapid Transit
Sukhumvit Line	Lam Luk Ka Extension	TBA	Khu Khot	Eastern Ring Road Lam Luk Ka	7.8 km (4.8 mi)	4	Postponed
Sukhumvit Line	Tamru Extension	TBA	Kheha	Tamru	10.1 km (6.3 mi)	4	Postponed
Sukhumvit Line	Infill station between Ari and Saphan Khwai stations	TBA	Sena Ruam		-	1	Postponed
Silom Line	Yot Se Extension	TBA	National Stadium	Yot Se	1.2 km (0.75 mi)	1	Planning
Silom Line	Bang Wa to Taling Chan Section	TBA	Bang Wa	Taling Chan	7.94 km (4.93 mi)	6	Planning
Silom Line	Taling Chan to Bang Rak Noi Tha It Section	TBA	Taling Chan	Bang Rak Noi Tha It	8.60 km (5.34 mi)	7	Planning
People Mover
Gold Line	Prachadhipok Extension	TBA	Khlong San	Prachadhipok	1.2 km (0.75 mi)	1	Postponed
Total					36.84 km (22.89 mi)	24	

== Terminal stations ==
Terminal stations and physical ends of their lines are Khu Khot, Kheha, National Stadium, Bang Wa.

Some trains terminate early and resume travel in the opposite direction at Kasetsart University, Mo Chit, and Samrong. This allows more frequent trains on the central sections of the lines without added investment in carriages.

== Rolling stock ==
The BTS Skytrain uses two variations of electric multiple unit rolling stock. All operate on 1,435 mm (4 ft 8 1/2 in) standard gauge. All trains have four doors on each side per car, an air-conditioning unit, and LCD monitors for public announcement and advertising. Public announcements are spoken by actress Ratklao Amaradit. The power supply for all trains is at 750 V DC from the third rail.

=== Siemens trains ===
==== First order (EMU-A1) ====
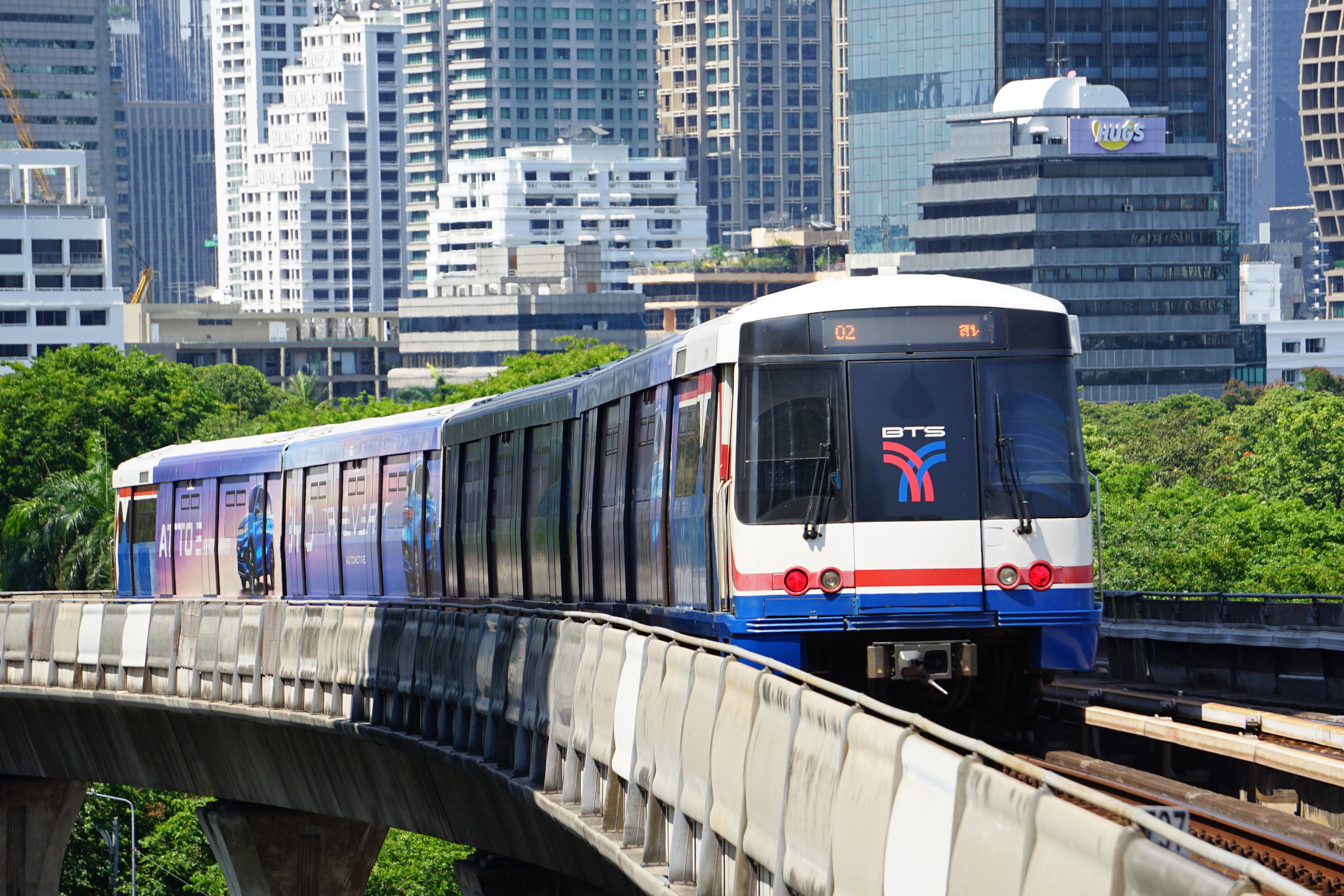
Siemens Modular Metro train (EMU-A1)

The rolling stock of BTS Skytrain, in use when the line opened in 1999, consisted of 35 Siemens Modular Metro trains from Siemens. These initial trains had three cars, two motor cars and one trailer in the center. The Sukhumvit Line used 20 trains, and the Silom Line had 15.

After the 12 new car CNR trains were delivered for the Silom Line in December 2010, the 15 Siemens trains on the Silom Line were transferred to the Sukhumvit Line.

==== Second order: extra cars to expand to four-car train operations (EMU-A1) ====
To increase capacity, in October 2010, BTSC ordered an extra 35 single cars from Siemens to make each train a four car set.

These extra cars were progressively introduced into operation from November 2012 to March 2013, when all 35 sets of Siemens rolling stock finally became four car sets.

The Silom Line cars have been modified to support a signaling system from Bombardier Transportation since the extension from Saphan Taksin to Wong Wian Yai.

EMU-A1 Formation

	← Bang Wa, Kheha National Stadium, Khu Khot →			
Car No.	1	2	3	4
Designation	M1	Tc1	Tc2	M2
Length (mm)	21,800	21,500	21,500	21,800
Numbering	1101; 1103; 1105 : 1169	3101; 3102; 3103 : 3135	3201; 3202; 3203 : 3235	1102; 1104; 1106 : 1170

• Car 3 was added later

==== Third order: new four-car sets for extension operations (EMU-A2) ====
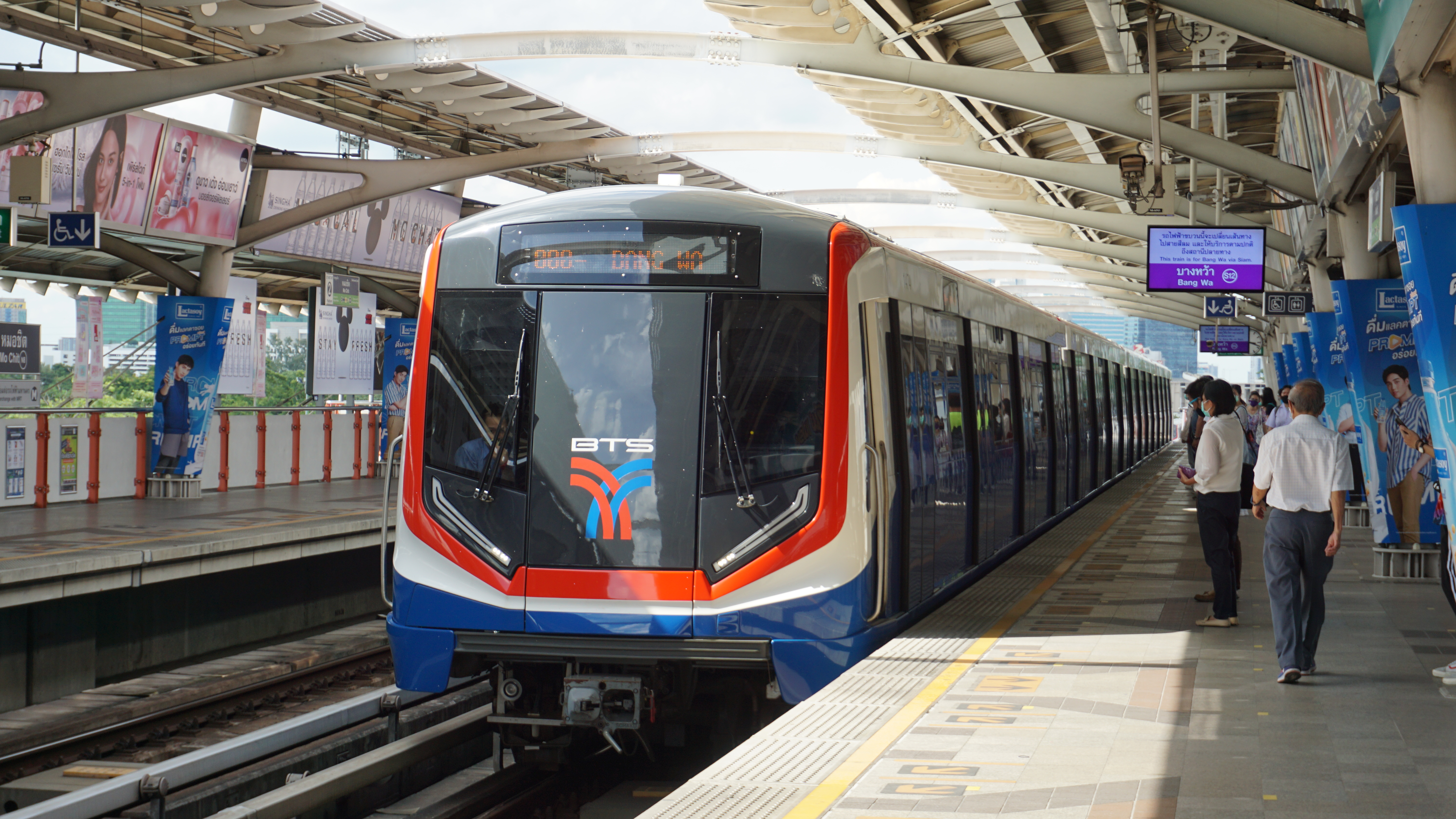
Siemens EMU-A2

To serve the Sukhumvit Line Extension (East) BTSC ordered 22 new Siemens four-car trains from a consortium of Siemens and Bozankaya in May 2016.

These trains were manufactured in the Bozankaya factory in Ankara, Turkey. Siemens supplied bogies, traction, braking, and auxiliary systems and was responsible for project management, development, construction, and commissioning of the trains. Siemens will also take on service and maintenance for 16 years.

The first set of the new batch of rolling stock arrived in early August 2018 for testing and approval by the BTSC. These new trains increase capacity from 1,490 passengers per train to 1,572. As of the opening of the new Sukhumvit Line extension to Kheha Samut Prakan on 6 December 2018, only 3 sets of the 22 sets had been delivered. This resulted in a limited 10-minute frequency, shuttle service for the new extension as an interim measure until more rolling stock is delivered. All 22 vehicles began their operation on 5 December 2019.

The train features: Perch Seats, LCD Dynamic Route Map (AKA. Passengers Information Display)

	← Bang Wa, Kheha National Stadium, Khu Khot →			
Car No.	1	2	3	4
Designation	M1	Tc1	Tc2	M2
Length (mm)	21,800	21,500	21,500	21,800
Numbering	1353 : 1374	3153 : 3174	3253 : 3274	1453 : 1474

=== CNR Changchun trains ===
==== First order (EMU-B1) ====
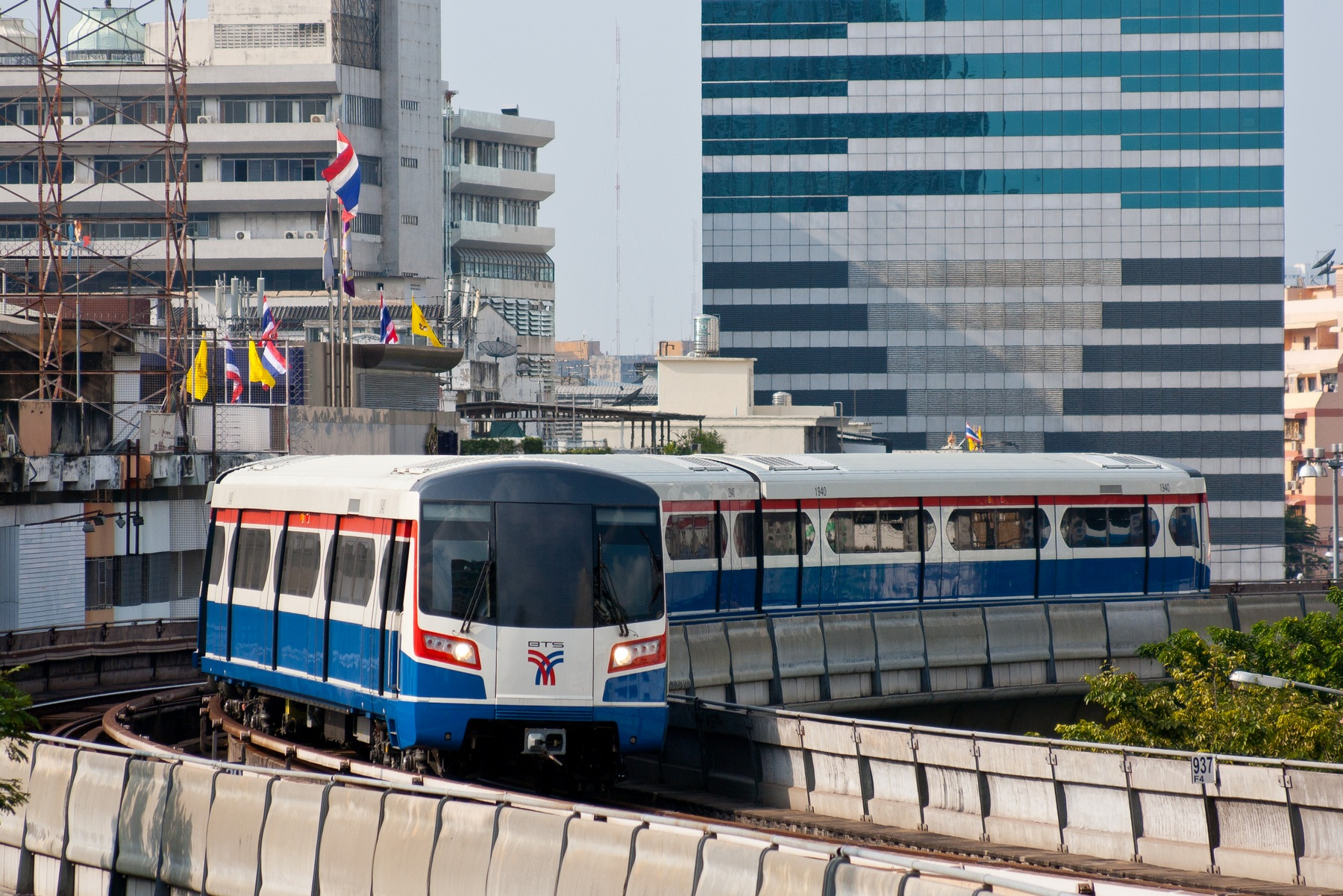
Changchun Railway Vehicles train (EMU-B1, EMU-B2)

In early 2008, the BTSC ordered 12 new trains (12 sets of four cars) from Changchun Railway Vehicles (EMU B class) to cater for the then soon to open Wong Wian Yai extension of the Silom Line. Their design was modified to the existing BTS's Siemens Modular Metro. The new trains were delivered late and only began service the Silom Line in December 2010. This was some 18 months after the Wong Wian Yai and Krung Thonburi stations were opened in May 2009 during which time there was severe overcrowding on the Silom Line.

These trains consist of two-motor cars and two-trailer cars (i.e., four-car trainset) and feature LCD TVs for public announcements and advertising. An advanced digital voice announcement (DVA) and passenger information systems was installed.

==== Second order (EMU-B2) ====
In September 2011, the BTSC ordered five more four-car trainsets of CNR rolling stock for 1.5 billion baht to prepare for the Silom Line extension to Bang Wa which was then due to open in December 2012. These five new train sets of rolling stock entered service on 29 November 2013 after the first two stations of the Silom Line extension to Bang Wa opened in January and February 2013, respectively. This second batch of CNR EMUs (B Class) differ slightly from the first batch in exterior fitting out such as with the LCDs screens, LED route displays, signage, and passenger communication units.

EMU-B1/B2 Formation

	← Bang Wa, Kheha National Stadium, Khu Khot →			
Car No.	1	2	3	4
Designation	Tc1	M1	M2	Tc2
Length (mm)	21,860	21,770	21,770	21,860
Numbering	1936 : 1952	2936 : 2952	2836 : 2852	1836 : 1852

=== CRRC Changchun trains (EMU-B3) ===
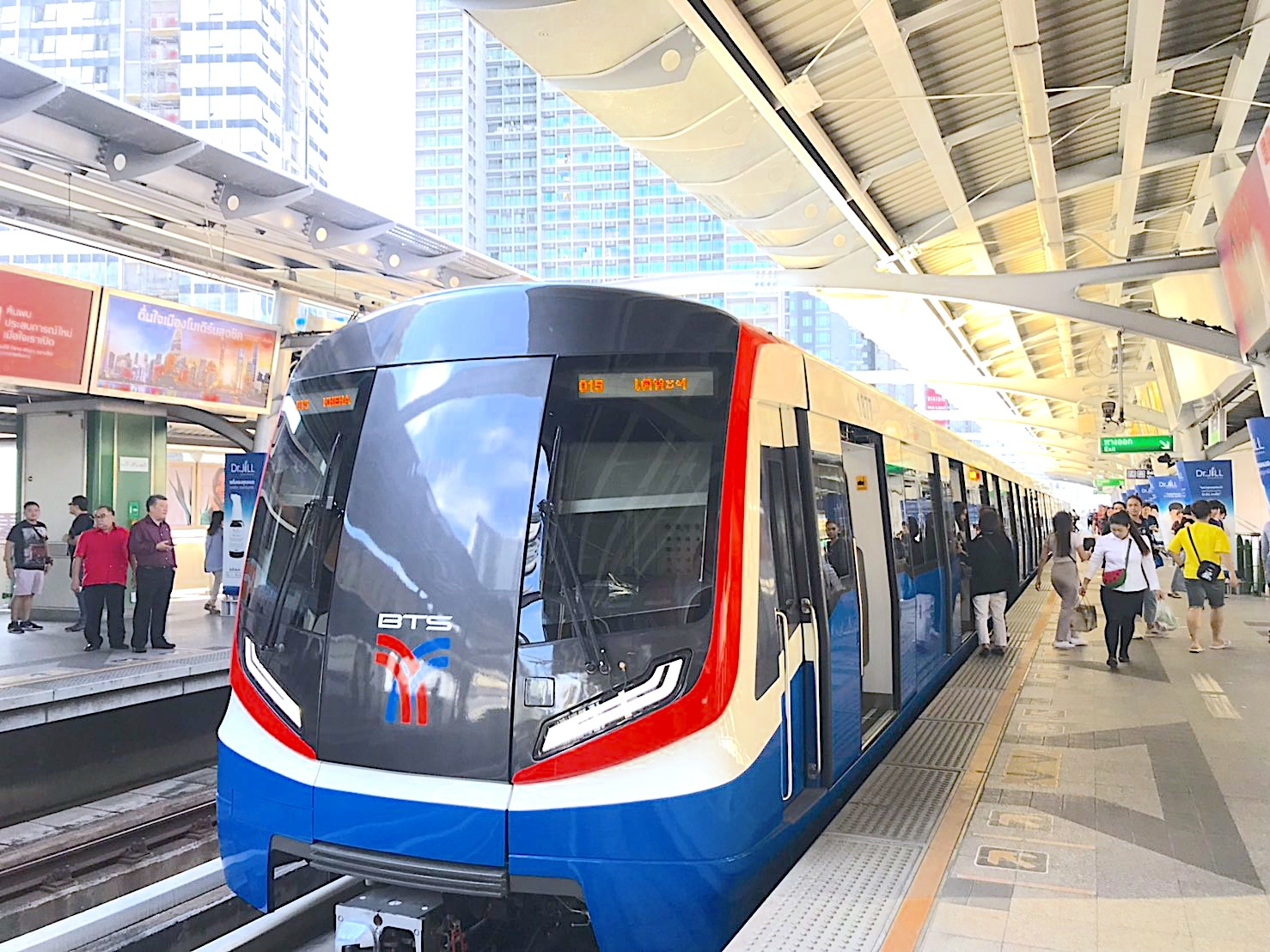
Changchun Railway Vehicles train (EMU-B3)

In May 2016, BTSC has signed a contract to order 24 more four-car trains of CRRC Changchun Railway Vehicles rolling stock to prepare for the Sukhumvit Line extension (North) and to cater for increasing demand, with expected delivery in 2018.

It has delivered 24 of its cars to Mo Chit Depot. 24 cars are now operating its service on the Silom Line and Sukhumvit Line (Car 75–98). These vehicles began their operation with the launch of the northern extension in December 2019.

This train features: Perch Seats, LCD Dynamic Route Map (AKA. Passengers Information Display)

	← Bang Wa, Kheha National Stadium, Khu Khot →			
Car No.	1	2	3	4
Designation	Mc1	T1	T2	Mc2
Length (mm)	21,860	21,770	21,770	21,860
Numbering	1975 : 1998	2975 : 2998	2875 : 2898	1875 : 1898

== Ridership ==
BTS Skytrain ridership
Year	Daily ridership
2006	383,635
2007	361,977
2008	372,551
2009	386,145
2010	392,376
2011	458,275
2012	530,422
2013	571,855
2014	598,984
2015	629,218
2016	647,752
2017	657,784
2018	658,123

The first years of operations saw limited ridership. The line had few direct ramps into malls and lacked escalators. Little by little, while escalators were installed and side bridges added, patronage increased. The opening of Siam Paragon Mall in 2004, at the time Thailand's most luxurious mall, boosted crowds at the system's central Siam station. The redevelopment of the Ratchaprasong and Siam districts as well as new "skywalks" fostered growing accessibility.

Ridership grew steadily with incremental expansion of the lines, and at peak hour, the trains sometimes depart without being able to take all waiting passengers. Average daily ridership first surpassed 200,000 in June 2001, 300,000 in November 2003, 400,000 in March 2006, 500,000 in August 2011, 600,000 in August 2013 and 700,000 in November 2017. Ridership decreased significantly during the COVID-19 pandemic in Thailand.

From 25 January to 31 January 2025, Prime Minister Paetongtarn Shinawatra has implemented a policy of free public transportation in Bangkok for one week. This measure aims to address the worsening air pollution caused by surging dust levels across all districts of the capital.

=== Sukhumvit and Silom Lines ===
==== Ridership ====
BTS Skytrain Ridership
Year	Quarter	Quarterly Ridership	Daily Ridership	Annual Ridership	Remarks
1999			169,842	4,585,743	BTS from Mo Chit to On Nut, and BTS from National Stadium to Saphan Taksin opened.
2000			150,469	55,092,671	
2001			202,685	74,025,652	
2002			256,033	93,493,981	
2003			280,379	102,348,697	
2004			316,068	115,681,448	Mo Chit and Sala Daeng stations became connecting stations to MRT
2005			348,795	127,350,084	
2006			383,635	140,048,849	
2007			361,977	132,070,502	
2008			372,551	136,350,007	
2009			386,145	140,957,969	BTS extended from Saphan Taksin to Wongwian Yai.
2010			392,376	143,102,971	Phaya Thai station became a connecting station to ARL
2011			458,275	167,348,070	BTS extended from On Nut to Bearing.
2012			530,422	194,113,068	
2013			571,855	208,764,971	BTS extended from Wongwian Yai to Bang Wa.
2014			598,984	219,422,367	
2015			629,218	229,853,593	
2016			647,752	237,047,435	
2017	Q1	62,946,441	699,405	241,067,194	
2017	Q2	60,863,929	668,835	241,067,194	BTS extended from Bearing to Samrong on 3 April 2017.
2017	Q3	65,172,468	708,370	241,067,194	
2017	Q4	63,745,855	692,890	241,067,194	
2018	Q1	63,045,888	700,510	252,728,693	
2018	Q2	59,978,033	659,100	252,728,693	
2018	Q3	64,294,989	698,859	252,728,693	
2018	Q4	65,374,718	710,595	252,728,693	BTS extended from Samrong to Kheha 6 December 2018.
2019	Q1	66,097,625	734,419	272,019,716	
2019	Q2	64,822,835	712,339	272,019,716	
2019	Q3	70,115,254	762,123	272,019,716	BTS extended from Mo Chit to Ha Yaek Lat Phrao on 9 August 2019. Bang Wa station became a connecting station to MRT on 24 August 2019.
2019	Q4	70,984,002	771,566	272,019,716	BTS extended from Ha Yaek Lat Phrao to Kasetsart University on 4 December 2019.
2020	Q1	59,291,978	651,561	182,192,995	1st wave of COVID-19 outbreaks (January 2020 - May 2020) BTS extended from Kasetsart University to Wat Phra Si Mahathat on 5 June 2020.
2020	Q2	22,939,540	252,083	182,192,995	1st wave of COVID-19 outbreaks (January 2020 - May 2020) BTS extended from Kasetsart University to Wat Phra Si Mahathat on 5 June 2020.
2020	Q3	48,955,508	532,126	182,192,995	
2020	Q4	51,005,969	554,413	182,192,995	2nd wave of COVID-19 outbreaks (December 2020 - February 2021) BTS extended from Wat Phra Si Mahathat to Khu Khot on 16 December 2020.
2021	Q1	38,232,160	424,802	108,173,568	2nd wave of COVID-19 outbreaks (December 2020 - February 2021) BTS extended from Wat Phra Si Mahathat to Khu Khot on 16 December 2020.
2021	Q2	22,526,522	241,545	108,173,568	3rd wave of COVID-19 outbreaks (April 2021 - June 2021)
2021	Q3	15,183,932	165,043	108,173,568	4th wave of COVID-19 outbreaks (July 2021 - early 2022)
2021	Q4	32,230,954	350,336	108,173,568	4th wave of COVID-19 outbreaks (July 2021 - early 2022)
2022	Q1	33,475,581	371,951	194,380,472	4th wave of COVID-19 outbreaks (July 2021 - early 2022)
2022	Q2	42,464,069	466,639	194,380,472	4th wave of COVID-19 outbreaks (July 2021 - early 2022)
2022	Q3	55,921,417	607,842	194,380,472	
2022	Q4	62,519,405	679,559	194,380,472	
2023	Q1			264,066,131	Data from January to July 2023 is not announced. Samrong station became an interchange station with MRT on 3 July 2023.
2023	Q2			264,066,131	Data from January to July 2023 is not announced. Samrong station became an interchange station with MRT on 3 July 2023.
2023	Q3	46,793,194*	767,102*	264,066,131	Data from January to July 2023 is not announced. Samrong station became an interchange station with MRT on 3 July 2023.
2023	Q4	69,958,534	760,419	264,066,131	
2024	Q1	64,550,586	709,348	263,955,804	Wat Phra Si Mahathat station became an interchange station with MRT on 7 January 2024.
2024	Q2	61,665,894	677,648	263,955,804	
2024	Q3	68,982,349	749,809	263,955,804	
2024	Q4	68,756,975	747,359	263,955,804	
2025	Q1	67,727,296	752,526	261,364,984	Free public transportation policy was implemented between 25 and 31 January 2025. Train services were temporarily suspended due to 2025 Myanmar Earthquake on 28 March 2025.
2025	Q2	60,286,523	662,490	261,364,984	
2025	Q3	66,939,489	727,604	261,364,984	
2025	Q4	66,411,676	721,867	261,364,984	As of December 2025.
2026	Q1	62,902,258	698,914	182,926,732	
2026	Q2	57,111,673	627,601	182,926,732	
2026	Q3	62,912,801	683,835	182,926,732	As of September 2026
2026	Q4			182,926,732	

==== Stations ====
Busiest stations
No.	Station	Year total passengers (2021)
1	Siam	6,160,924
2	Asok	5,542,521
3	Mo Chit	5,166,915
4	On Nut	4,238,083
5	Victory Monument	4,193,569
6	Ha Yaek Lat Phrao	4,181,874
7	Phrom Phong	3,664,227
8	Samrong	3,186,681
9	Chit Lom	3,154,058
10	Sala Daeng	3,043,054

Least-used stations
No.	Station	Year total passengers (2021)
1	Royal Thai Air Force Museum	171,534
2	Sai Luat	280,772
3	Bhumibol Adulyadej Hospital	321,744
4	Pho Nimit	328,396
5	Srinagarindra	472,787

== See also ==
- Sukhumvit Line
- Silom Line
- Keeree Kanjanapas
- Rail transport in Bangkok
- List of rapid transit stations in Bangkok
- Mass Rapid Transit Master Plan in Bangkok Metropolitan Region
- MRT (Bangkok)
- MRT Blue Line
- MRT Brown Line
- MRT Grey Line
- MRT Light Blue Line
- MRT Orange Line
- MRT Pink Line
- MRT Yellow Line
- Airport Rail Link (Bangkok)
- SRT Dark Red Line
- SRT Light Red Line
  - BMA Gold Line
- Bangkok BRT
