= Bangkok Mass Transit System =

Thai transport company

Bangkok Mass Transit System Public Company Limited (BTSC, Thai: บริษัทระบบขนส่งมวลชนกรุงเทพ จำกัด (มหาชน)) is a Thai transport company, best known as the operator of Bangkok's BTS Skytrain. It is a majority-owned subsidiary of BTS Group Holdings (BTSG, previously known as Tanayong), and also operates the Bangkok BRT and the Gold Line.

== History and operations ==
BTSC was founded by Keeree Kanjanapas in 1992 to serve as Tanayong's concession operator for Bangkok's then-planned elevated rapid transit system. It was formed as a joint venture with Sino-Thai Engineering & Construction, Sito, and Dyckerhoff & Widmann. The company was publicly listed in 1996. It incurred heavy losses following the 1997 Asian financial crisis, and underwent business rehabilitation and debt restructuring from 2006 to 2008. In 2010, Tanayong renamed to BTSG and reacquired a 94.6 percent stake in BTSC, becoming the majority owner.

BTSC operates the BTS Skytrain, which opened in 1999. It is the sole concessionaire of the original BTS network (including stations from Mo Chit to On Nut on the Sukhumvit Line and National Stadium to Saphan Taksin on the Silom Line), of which the company was the sole investor, and operates extensions to the lines under concession agreements from the Bangkok Metropolitan Administration (via its investment arm the Krungthep Thanakom company) and the Mass Rapid Transit Authority of Thailand (MRTA). It also operates Bangkok's Bus Rapid Transit system, whose only line opened in 2010, and the Gold Line automated people mover, which opened in 2020.
