= Saphan Mai =

Neighbourhood of Bangkok, Thailand

Coordinates: 13°53′49.15″N 100°36′32.97″E

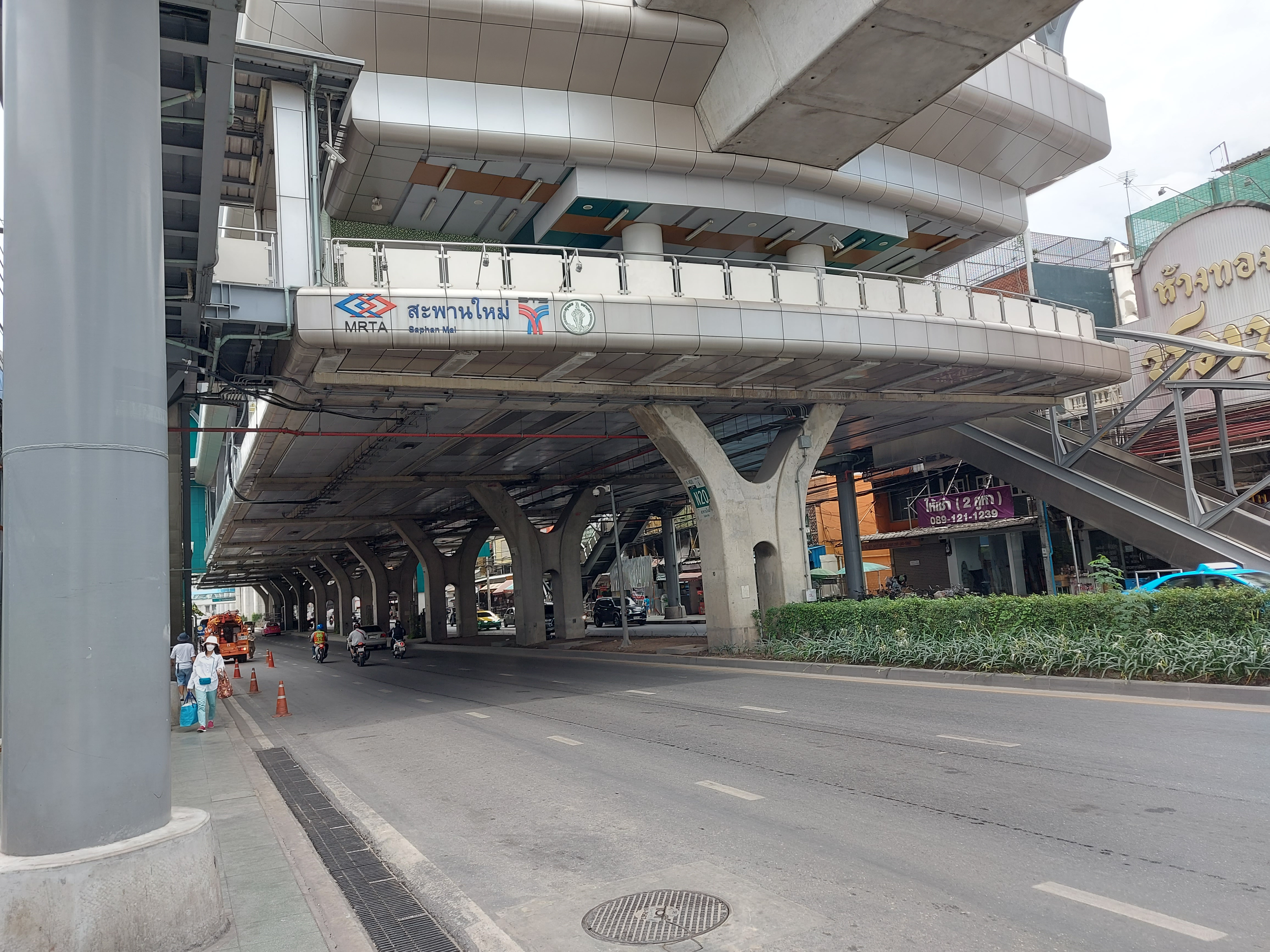
Saphan Mai BTS station, a station on the Sukhumvit Line

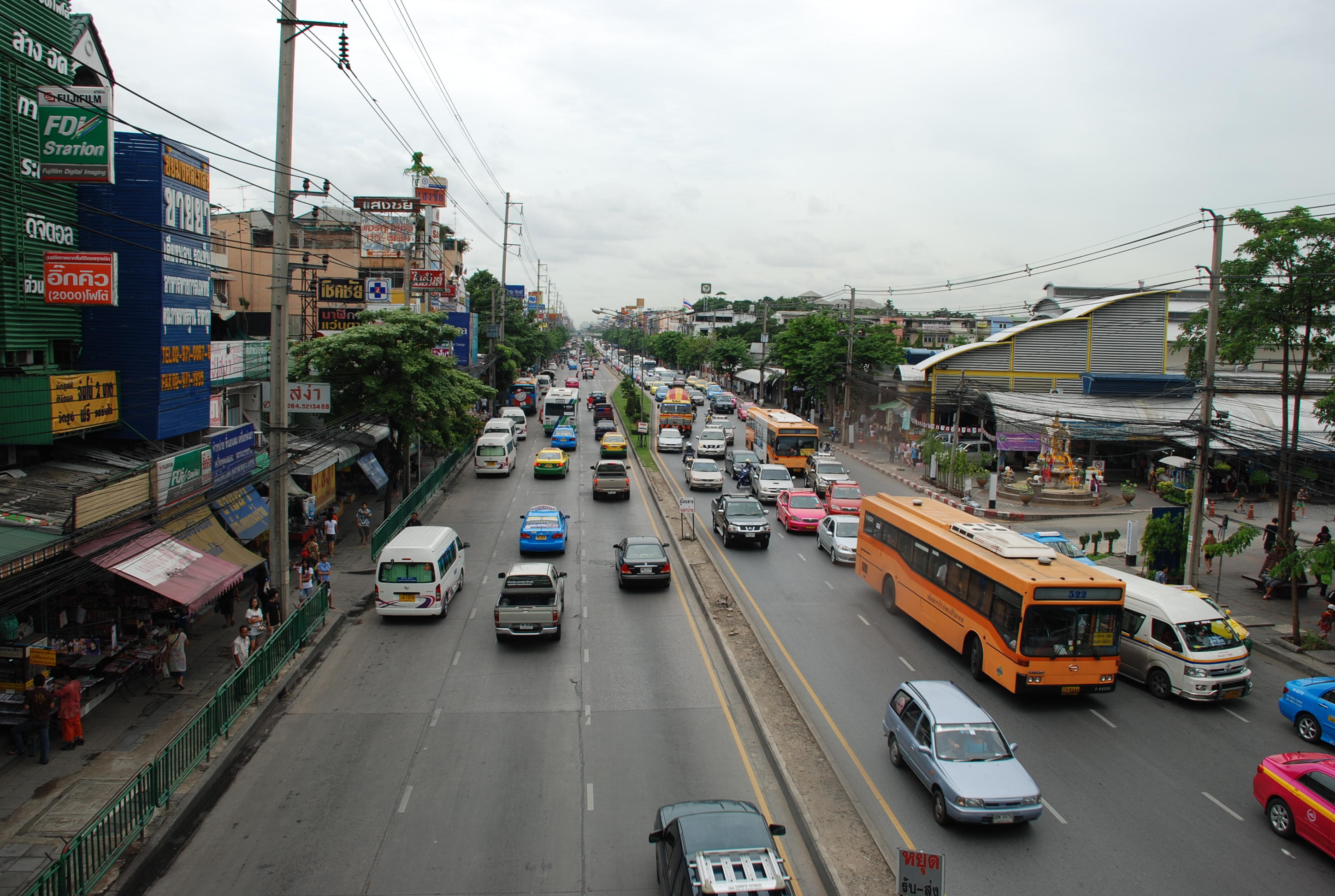
Phaholyothin Road, near Saphan Mai

Saphan Mai (Thai: สะพานใหม่, pronounced [sā.pʰāːn màj] 'new bridge') is a marketplace and neighbourhood in north Bangkok, chiefly in the Anusawari Subdistrict, Bang Khen District and part of Khlong Thanon Subdistrict, Sai Mai District. The Saphan Mai area covers two sides of Phahonyothin Road for about three kilometres (1.8 mi) from the south, Lak Si Circle, to north, Saphan Sukoranakhaseni, a bridge that spans Khlong Song or Khlong Thanon and connects Bang Khen, Sai Mai, and Don Mueang Districts.

The name Saphan Mai means 'new bridge'. It is the term used by locals for Saphan ('bridge') Sukoranakhaseni (สะพานสุกรนาคเสนีย์) which replaced the old bridge.

The main market in the Saphan Mai area is Talat Saphan Mai (ตลาดสะพานใหม่), also known as Talat Ying Charoen (ตลาดยิ่งเจริญ) a large wet market founded by Suwapee Thammawattana. It opened on 11 August 1955 on a plot of approximately 30 rai (about 11 acres).
