= Bhumibol Adulyadej Hospital =

Hospital in Thailand

Bhumibol Adulyadej Hospital โรงพยาบาลภูมิพลอดุลยเดช
- The Royal Thai Air Force
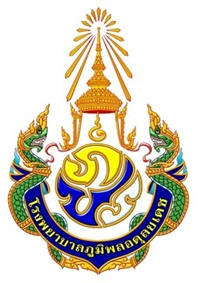

Geography
- Location: 171 Phahonyothin Road, Khlong Thanon Subdistrict, Sai Mai District, Bangkok 10220, Thailand
- Coordinates: 13.909114°N 100.617736°E

Organisation
- Type: Teaching, Military
- Affiliated university: Phramongkutklao College of Medicine; Royal Thai Air Force Nursing College; Faculty of Medicine, Chulalongkorn University

Services
- Beds: 694

History
- Founded: 27 March 1949

Links
- Website: www.bhumibolhospital.rtaf.mi.th
- Lists: Hospitals in Thailand

Bhumibol Adulyadej Hospital (Thai: โรงพยาบาลภูมิพลอดุลยเดช) is a hospital located in Sai Mai District, Bangkok, Thailand. It is a military hospital operated by the Directorate of Medical Services, The Royal Thai Air Force particularly for personnel of the Royal Thai Air Force, but also for the general public. It is a teaching hospital for Royal Thai Air Force Nursing College, Phramongkutklao College of Medicine as well as some clinical year (year 4-6) students of the Faculty of Medicine, Chulalongkorn University, under the agreement between the Faculty of Medicine and the Directorate of Medical Services.

Bhumibol Adulyadej Hospital has been served by the BTS Sukhumvit Line at Bhumibol Adulyadej Hospital BTS Station since 16 December 2020.

== History ==
Bhumibol Adulyadej Hospital was opened on 27 March 1949, named in honour of King Bhumibol Adulyadej. It initially had a capacity of 88 beds, and gradually expanded to have a building for each medical specialty, such as radiology, otorhinolaryngology and including separate internal medicine and surgery buildings for male and female patients.

== See also ==
- Healthcare in Thailand
- Hospitals in Thailand
- List of hospitals in Thailand
