= Sanam Pao BTS station =

Railway station in Bangkok, Thailand

Sanam Pao สนามเป้า
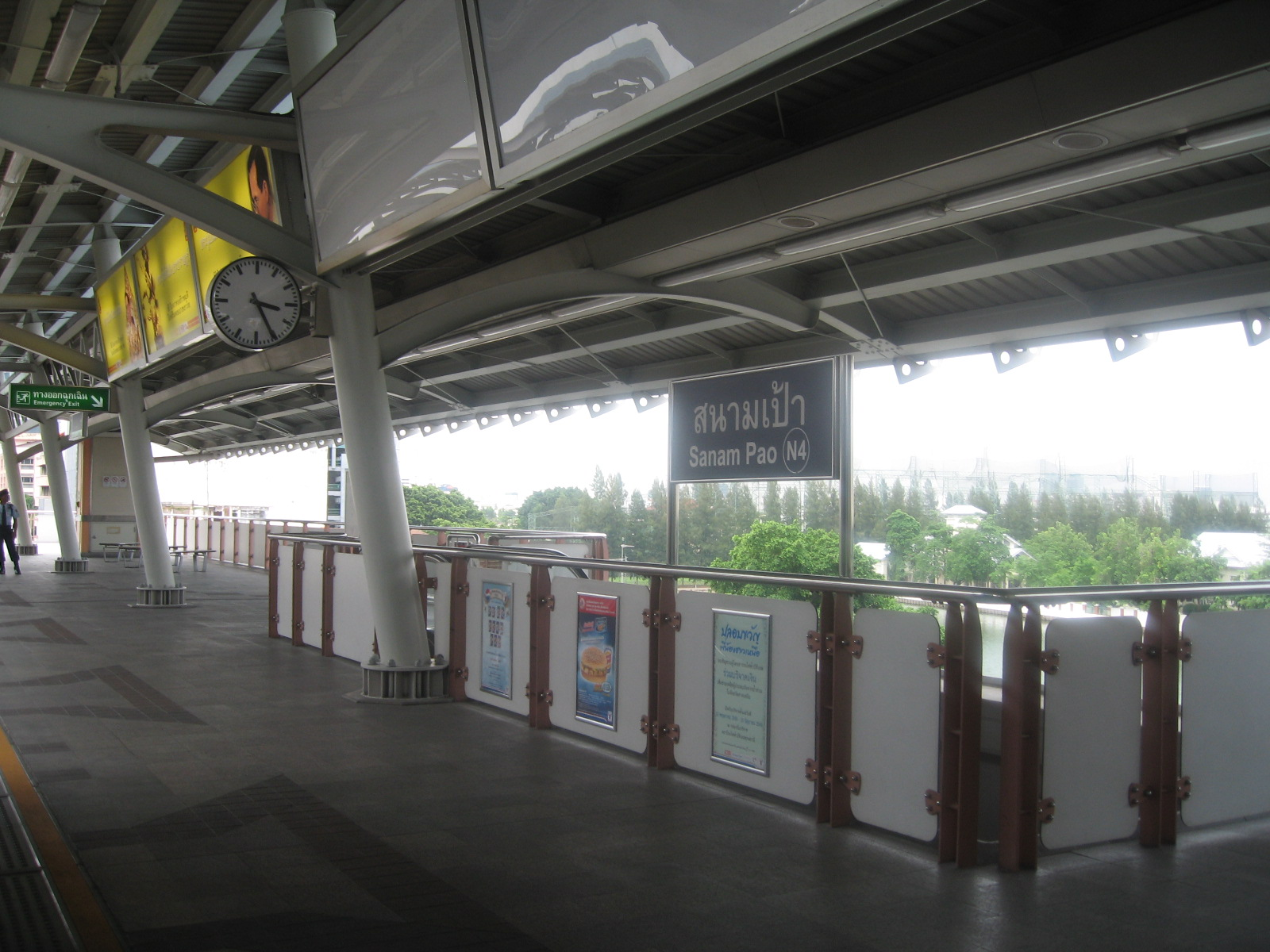
- Sanam Pao station

General information
- Location: Phaya Thai; Bangkok; Thailand
- Coordinates: 13°46′21.44″N 100°32′31.53″E
- System: BTS
- Owner: Bangkok Metropolitan Administration (BMA); BTS Rail Mass Transit Growth Infrastructure Fund (BTSGIF)
- Operator: Bangkok Mass Transit System; Public Company Limited (BTSC)
- Line: Sukhumvit Line

Other information
- Station code: N4

History
- Opened: 5 December 1999

Passengers
- 2021: 556,138

Services
| Preceding station | BTS Skytrain | Following station |
|---|---|---|
| Ari towards Khu Khot | Sukhumvit Line | Victory Monument towards Kheha |
Location

Sanam Pao Station Traditional sign

Sanam Pao station (Thai: สถานีสนามเป้า, pronounced [sā.tʰǎː.nīː sā.nǎːm pâw]) is a BTS skytrain station, on the Sukhumvit Line in Phaya Thai District, Bangkok, Thailand. The station is on Phahon Yothin Road near Soi Phahon Yothin 3 in Sanam Pao area, among office towers, an army base, and the site of Royal Thai Army Radio and Television Channel 5.

== See also ==
- Bangkok Skytrain
