= Ari BTS station =

Skytrain station in Bangkok, Thailand

Ari อารีย์
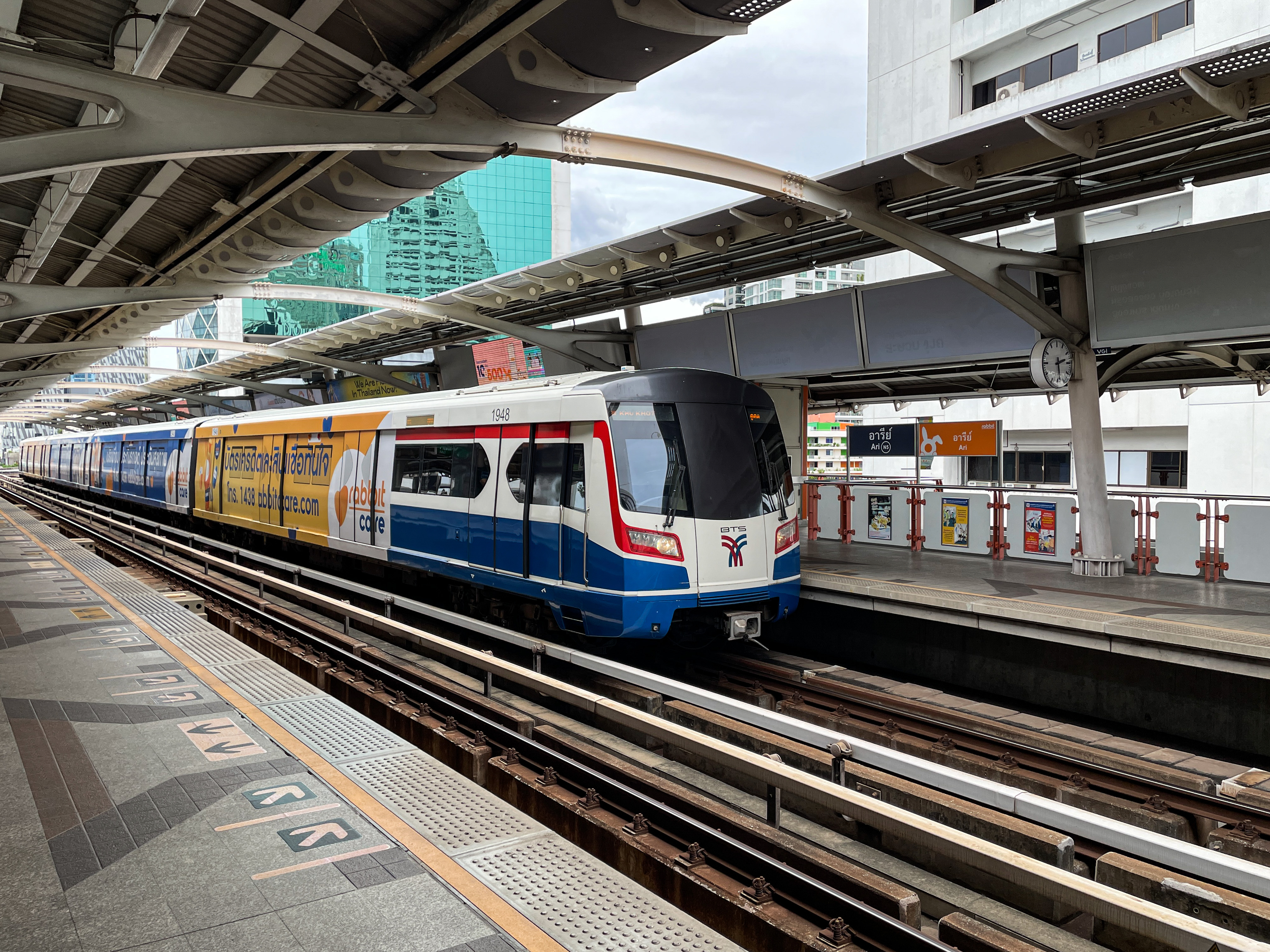

General information
- Location: Phaya Thai; Bangkok; Thailand
- Coordinates: 13°46′46.93″N 100°32′40.71″E
- System: BTS
- Owner: Bangkok Metropolitan Administration (BMA); BTS Rail Mass Transit Growth Infrastructure Fund (BTSGIF)
- Operator: Bangkok Mass Transit System; Public Company Limited (BTSC)
- Line: Sukhumvit Line

Other information
- Station code: N5

History
- Opened: 5 December 1999

Passengers
- 2021: 1,995,390

Services
| Preceding station | BTS Skytrain | Following station |
|---|---|---|
| Saphan Khwai towards Khu Khot | Sukhumvit Line | Sanam Pao towards Kheha |
Location

Ari Station sign

Ari station (Thai: สถานีอารีย์, pronounced [sā.tʰǎː.nīː ʔāː.rīː]) is a BTS Skytrain station, on the Sukhumvit Line in Phaya Thai District, Bangkok, Thailand. The station is on Phahonyothin Road at Soi Ari junction (Soi Phahon Yothin 7), an area with many office towers, apartments, food stalls and restaurants. The headquarters of the Ministry of Finance, the Ministry of Natural Resources and Environment, and the Public Relations Department are also in the neighbourhood of Soi Ari near Rama VI Road, a short distance to the west of the station.

== See also ==
- Bangkok Skytrain
