= Bhumibol Adulyadej Hospital BTS station =

Railway station in Bangkok, Thailand

Bhumibol Adulyadej Hospital โรงพยาบาลภูมิพลอดุลยเดช
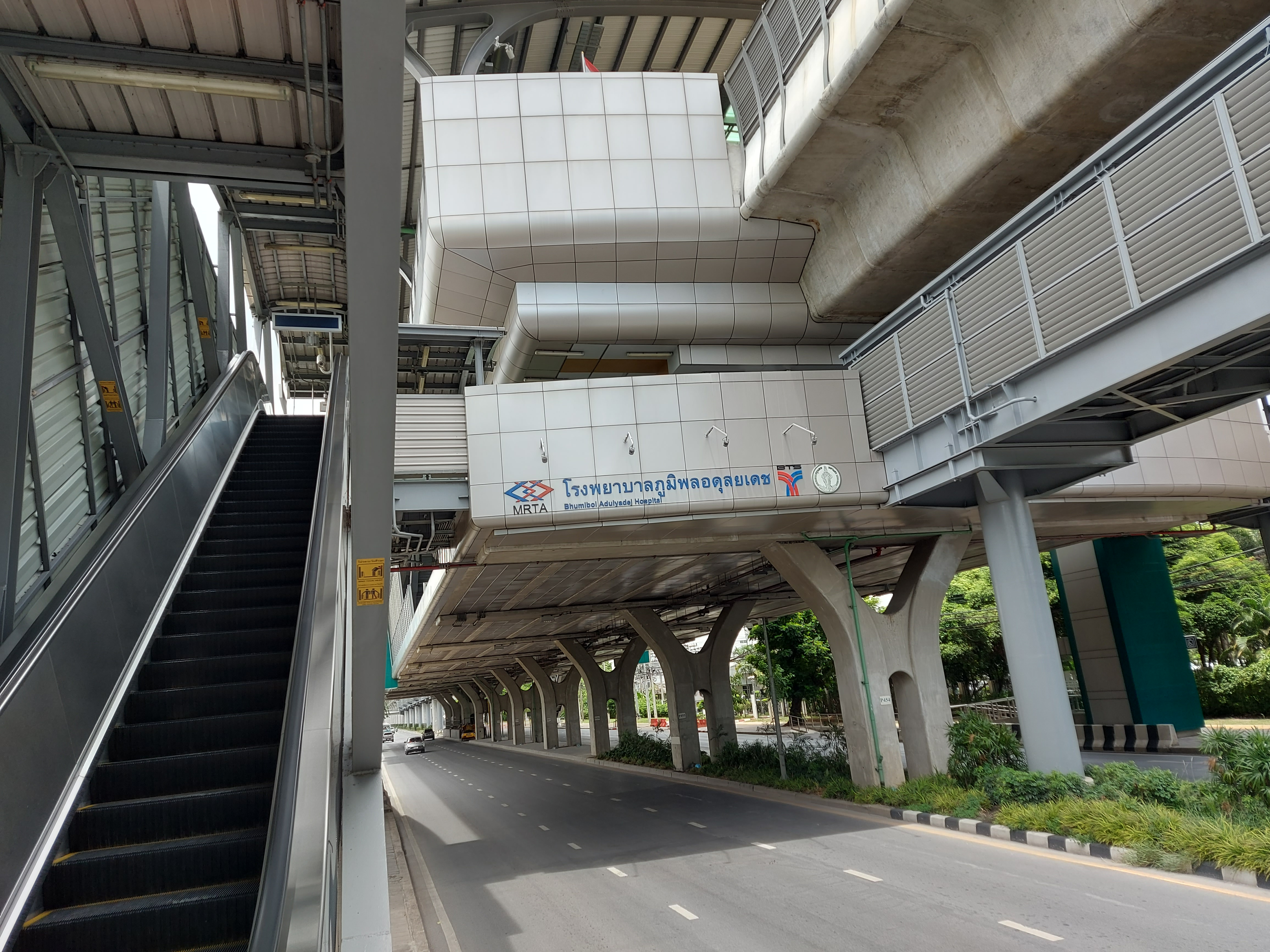

General information
- Location: Don Mueang and Sai Mai, Bangkok, Thailand
- Coordinates: 13.9108°N 100.6174°E
- System: BTS
- Owner: Bangkok Metropolitan Administration (BMA)
- Operator: Bangkok Mass Transit System; Public Company Limited (BTSC)
- Line: Sukhumvit Line

Other information
- Station code: N21

History
- Opened: 16 December 2020

Passengers
- 2021: 321,744

Services
Preceding station	BTS Skytrain	Following station
Royal Thai Air Force Museum towards Khu Khot	Sukhumvit Line	Saphan Mai towards Kheha
Location

Bhumibol Adulyadej Hospital Station Traditional sign

Bhumibol Adulyadej Hospital Station (Thai: สถานีโรงพยาบาลภูมิพลอดุลยเดช RTGS: Sathani Rong Phayaban Phumiphon Adunyadet) is a BTS Skytrain station, on the Sukhumvit Line in Bangkok, Thailand. It is located in front of Bhumibol Adulyadej Hospital. The station is part of the northern extension of the Sukhumvit Line and opened on 16 December 2020, as part of phase 4.

== See also ==
- Bangkok Skytrain
