= Ratchayothin BTS station =

BTS Skytrain station in Bangkok

Ratchayothin รัชโยธิน
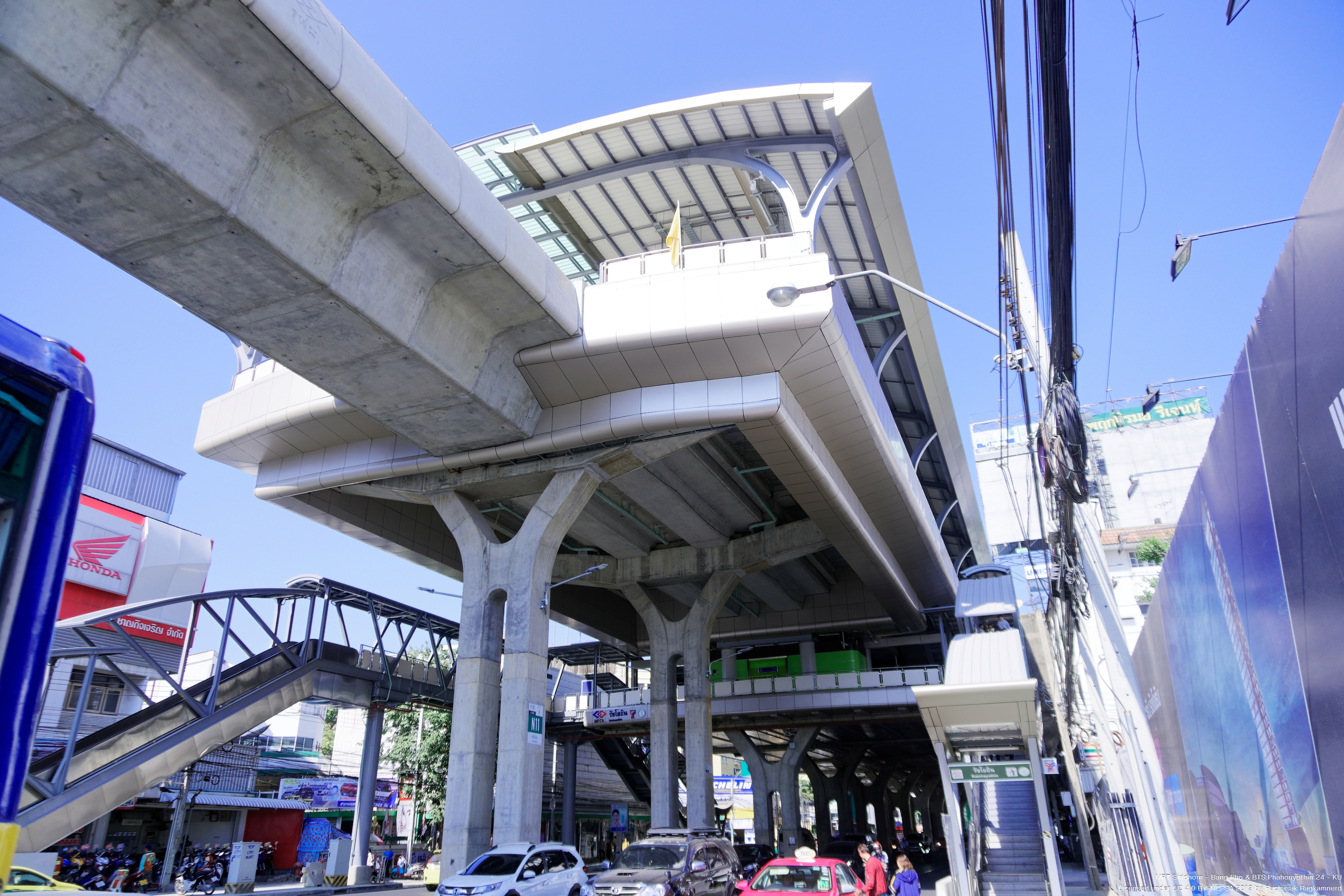

General information
- Location: Chatuchak, Bangkok, Thailand
- Coordinates: 13.8297°N 100.5697°E
- System: BTS
- Owner: Bangkok Metropolitan Administration (BMA)
- Operator: Bangkok Mass Transit System; Public Company Limited (BTSC)
- Line: Sukhumvit Line

Other information
- Station code: N11

History
- Opening: 4 December 2019; 6 years ago

Passengers
- 2021: 1,850,436

Services
Preceding station	BTS Skytrain	Following station
Sena Nikhom towards Khu Khot	Sukhumvit Line	Phahon Yothin 24 towards Kheha
Location

Ratchayothin Station Traditional sign

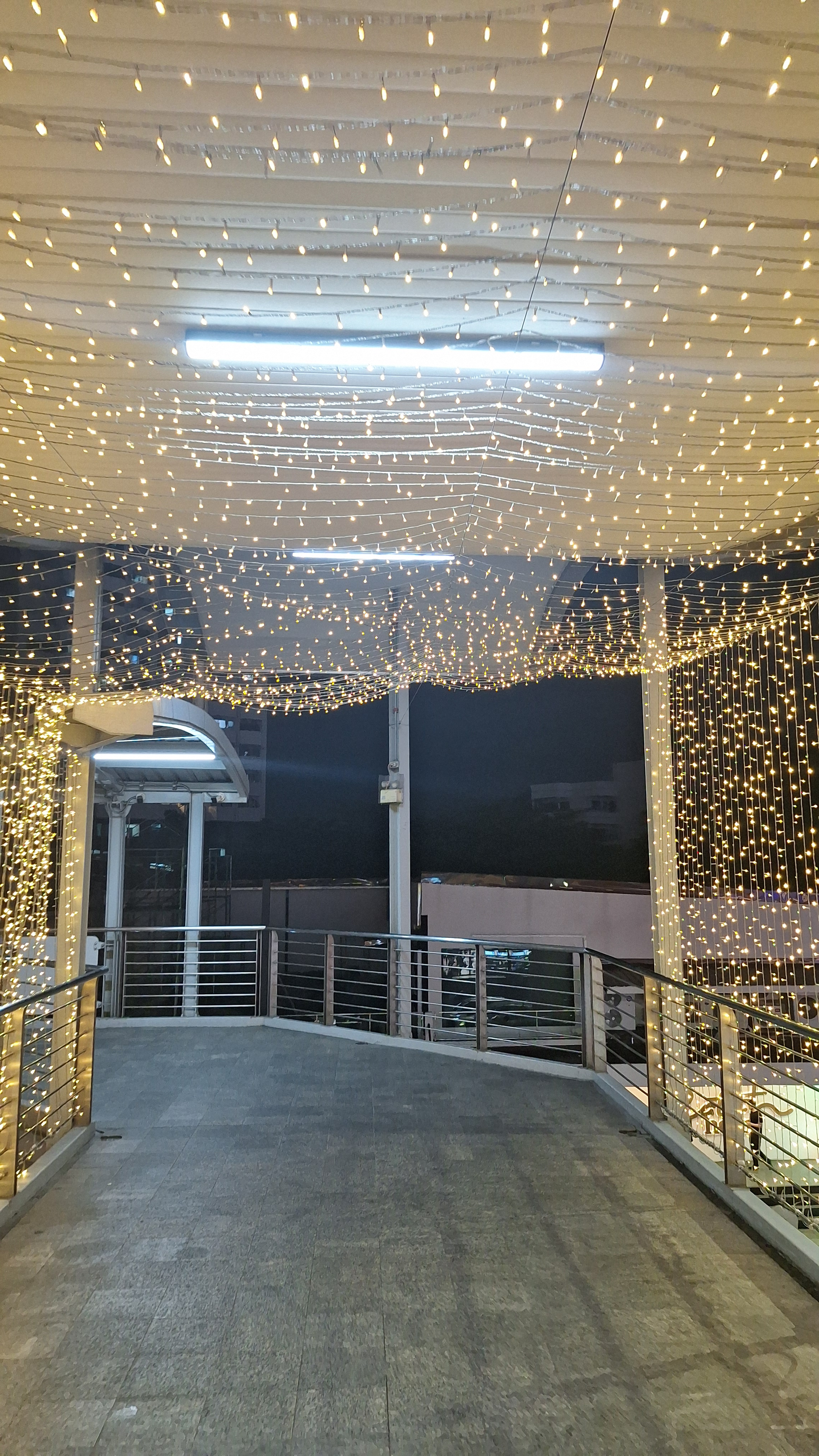
Skywalk connect between Major Cineplex Ratchayothin and Ratchayothin BTS station

Ratchayothin Station (Thai: สถานีรัชโยธิน, pronounced [sā.tʰǎː.nīː rát.t͡ɕʰā.jōː.tʰīn]) is a BTS Skytrain station, on the Sukhumvit line in Bangkok, Thailand. The station was planned to open in 2020 when all stations on the northern extension was completed, but the Ministry of Transport requested the station to open in phase 2 (Ha Yaek Lat Phrao-Kasetsart University) in December 2019.

== See also ==
- Bangkok Skytrain
