= Ha Yaek Lat Phrao BTS station =

Metro station in Bangkok, Thailand

Ha Yaek Lat Phrao ห้าแยกลาดพร้าว
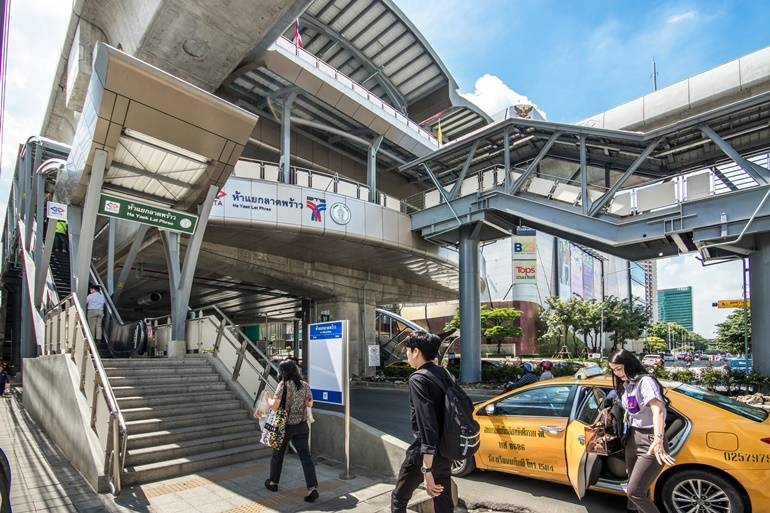

General information
- Location: Chatuchak, Bangkok, Thailand
- Coordinates: 13.647363°N 100.596153°E
- System: BTS
- Owner: Bangkok Metropolitan Administration (BMA)
- Operator: Bangkok Mass Transit System; Public Company Limited (BTSC)
- Line: Sukhumvit Line
- Connections: Blue Line (Phahon Yothin)

Other information
- Station code: N9

History
- Opening: 9 August 2019
- Former names: Ladphrao Intersection

Passengers
- 2021: 4,181,874

Services
Preceding station	BTS Skytrain	Following station
Phahon Yothin 24 towards Khu Khot	Sukhumvit Line	Mo Chit towards Kheha
Preceding station	Metropolitan Rapid Transit	Following station
Lat Phrao towards Lak Song	Blue Line transfer at Phahon Yothin	Chatuchak Park towards Tha Phra
Location

Ha Yaek Lat Phrao Station Traditional sign

Ha Yaek Lat Phrao station (Thai: สถานีห้าแยกลาดพร้าว, pronounced [sā.tʰǎː.nīː hâː jɛ̂ːk lâːt pʰráːw]; formerly known as Ladphrao Intersection station) is a BTS Skytrain station on the Sukhumvit Line in Bangkok, Thailand. The station was renamed to the Thai transliteration due to fears of miscommunication.

The station connects to the Phahon Yothin MRT station on the MRT Blue Line. The station is directly linked to both Central Ladprao and Union Mall via a skywalk. It was the northern terminus of the line until 4 December 2019, which was when Kasetsart University station opened. It is one of only four operational BTS stations to have island platforms, the others being Siam, Samrong, and Wat Phra Sri Mahathat.

== See also ==
- Bangkok Skytrain
