= Victory Monument BTS station =

Railway station in Bangkok, Thailand

Victory Monument อนุสาวรีย์ชัยสมรภูมิ
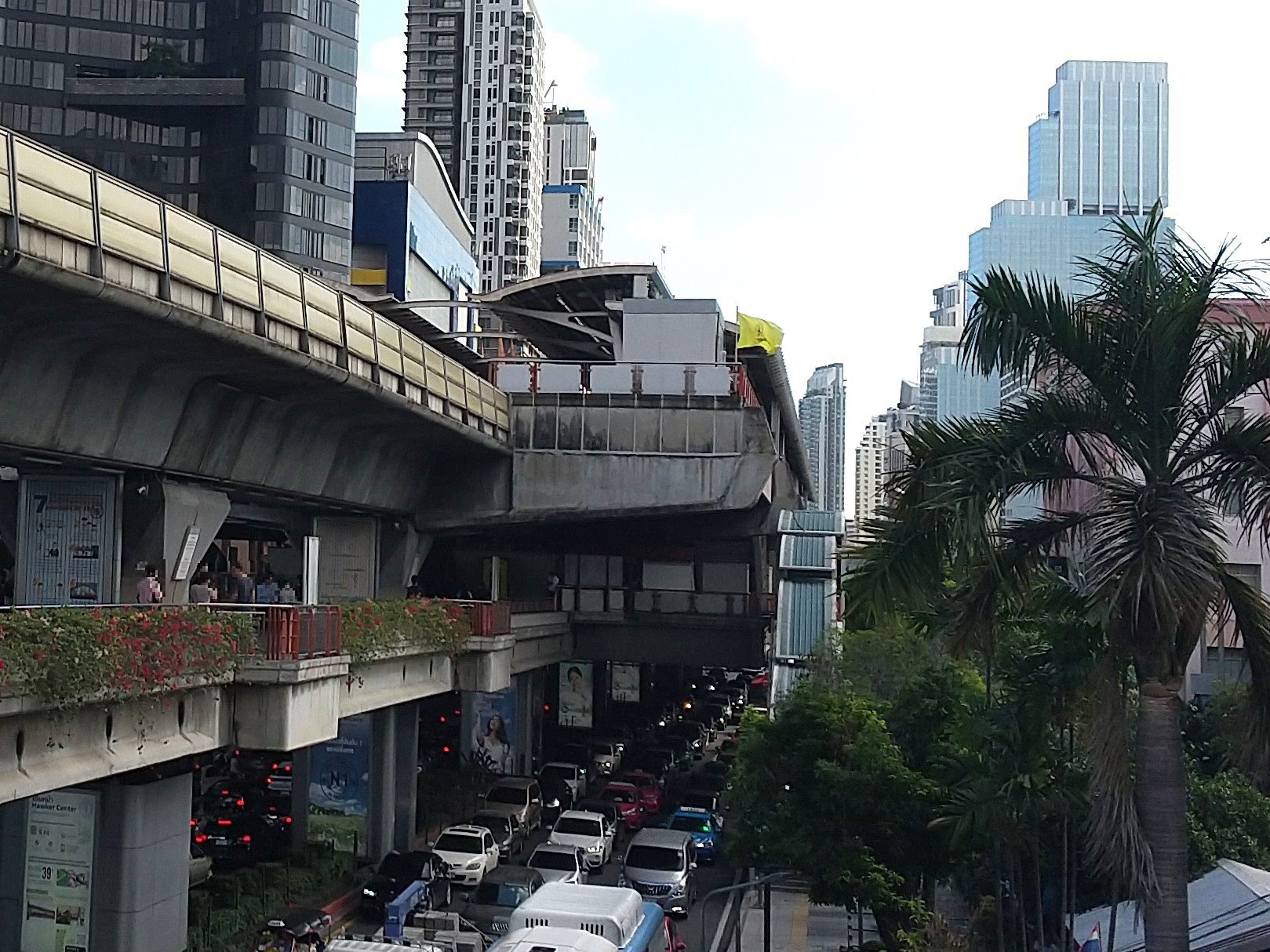

General information
- Location: Ratchathewi; Bangkok; Thailand
- Coordinates: 13°45′45.88″N 100°32′13.51″E
- System: BTS
- Owner: Bangkok Metropolitan Administration (BMA); BTS Rail Mass Transit Growth Infrastructure Fund (BTSGIF)
- Operator: Bangkok Mass Transit System; Public Company Limited (BTSC)
- Line: Sukhumvit Line

Other information
- Station code: N3

History
- Opened: 5 December 1999

Passengers
- 2021: 4,193,569

Services
| Preceding station | BTS Skytrain | Following station |
|---|---|---|
| Sanam Pao towards Khu Khot | Sukhumvit Line | Phaya Thai towards Kheha |
Location

Victory Monument Station Traditional sign

Victory Monument station (Thai: สถานีอนุสาวรีย์ชัยสมรภูมิ; RTGS: Sathani Anusaowari Chai Samoraphum) is a BTS skytrain station, on the Sukhumvit Line in Ratchathewi District, Bangkok, Thailand. The station is located on Phaya Thai Road to the south of the Victory Monument, one of the landmark and major traffic intersection of Bangkok. The station is linked to all four corners of the traffic circle by a skybridge which almost traverses around the monument. There are many food stalls, clothing shops and malls around the station, as the monument is one of the largest BMTA bus stops in Bangkok and a large van terminal for travel to the suburbs and provinces around the capital.

== See also ==
- Bangkok Skytrain
