= Phahon Yothin 24 BTS station =

BTS Skytrain station in Bangkok

Phahon Yothin 24 พหลโยธิน 24
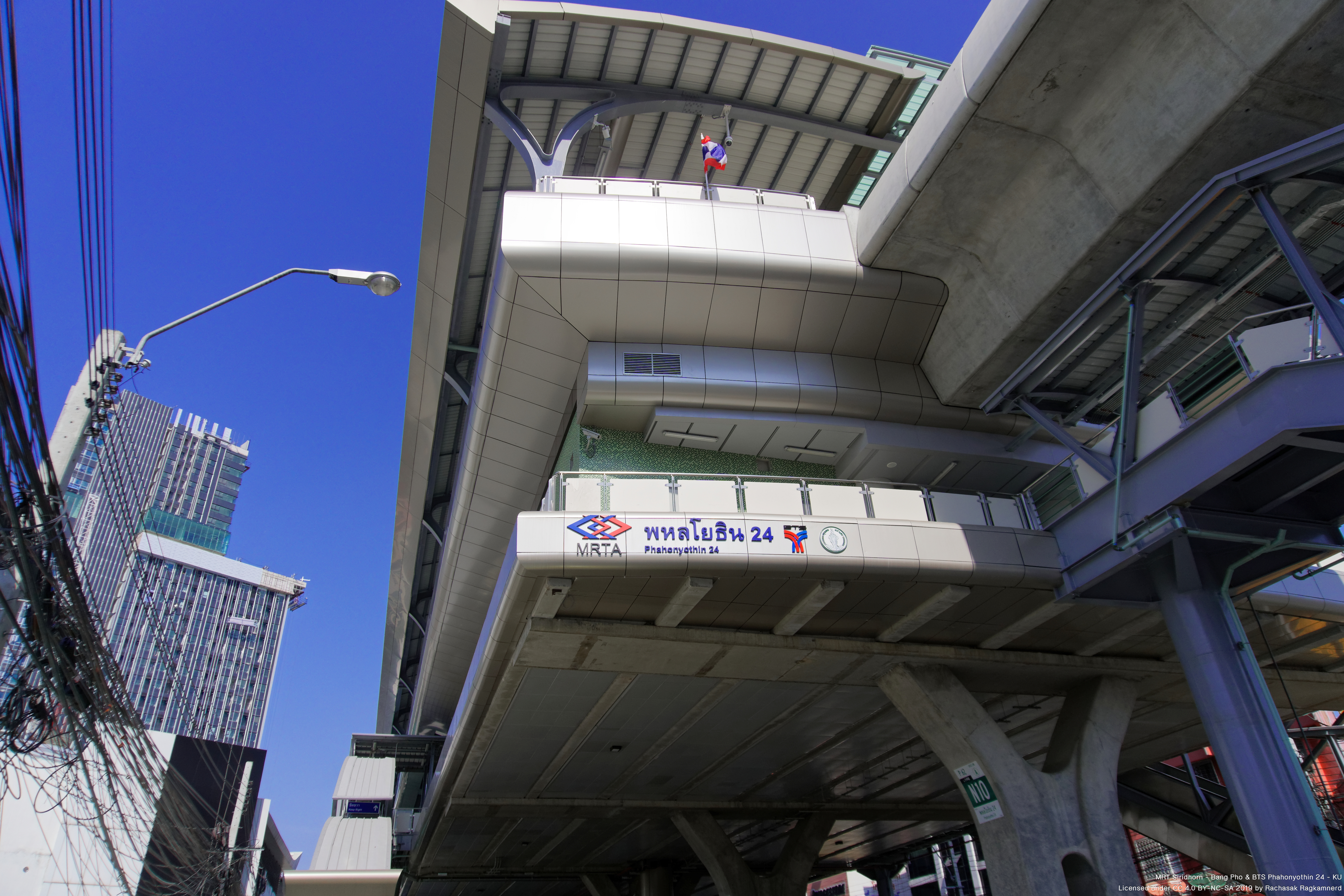

General information
- Location: Chatuchak, Bangkok, Thailand
- Coordinates: 13.8243°N 100.5665°E
- System: BTS
- Owner: Bangkok Metropolitan Administration (BMA)
- Operator: Bangkok Mass Transit System; Public Company Limited (BTSC)
- Line: Sukhumvit Line

Other information
- Station code: N10

History
- Opening: 4 December 2019

Passengers
- 2021: 754,400

Services
Preceding station	BTS Skytrain	Following station
Ratchayothin towards Khu Khot	Sukhumvit Line	Ha Yaek Lat Phrao towards Kheha
Location

Phahon Yothin 24 Station Traditional sign

Phahon Yothin 24 Station (Thai: สถานีพหลโยธิน 24, RTGS: Sathani Phahon Yothin Yi Sip Si, pronounced [sā.tʰǎː.nīː pʰā.hǒn jōː.tʰīn jîː sìp sìː]) is a BTS Skytrain station, on the Sukhumvit Line in Bangkok, Thailand. The station was planned to open in 2020 when all stations on the northern extension was completed, but the Ministry of Transport requested the station to open in phase 2 (Ha Yaek Lat Phrao-Kasetsart University) in December 2019.

== See also ==
- Bangkok Skytrain
