= Sukhumvit Line =

Rapid transit line in Bangkok, Thailand

BTS Sukhumvit Line สายสุขุมวิท

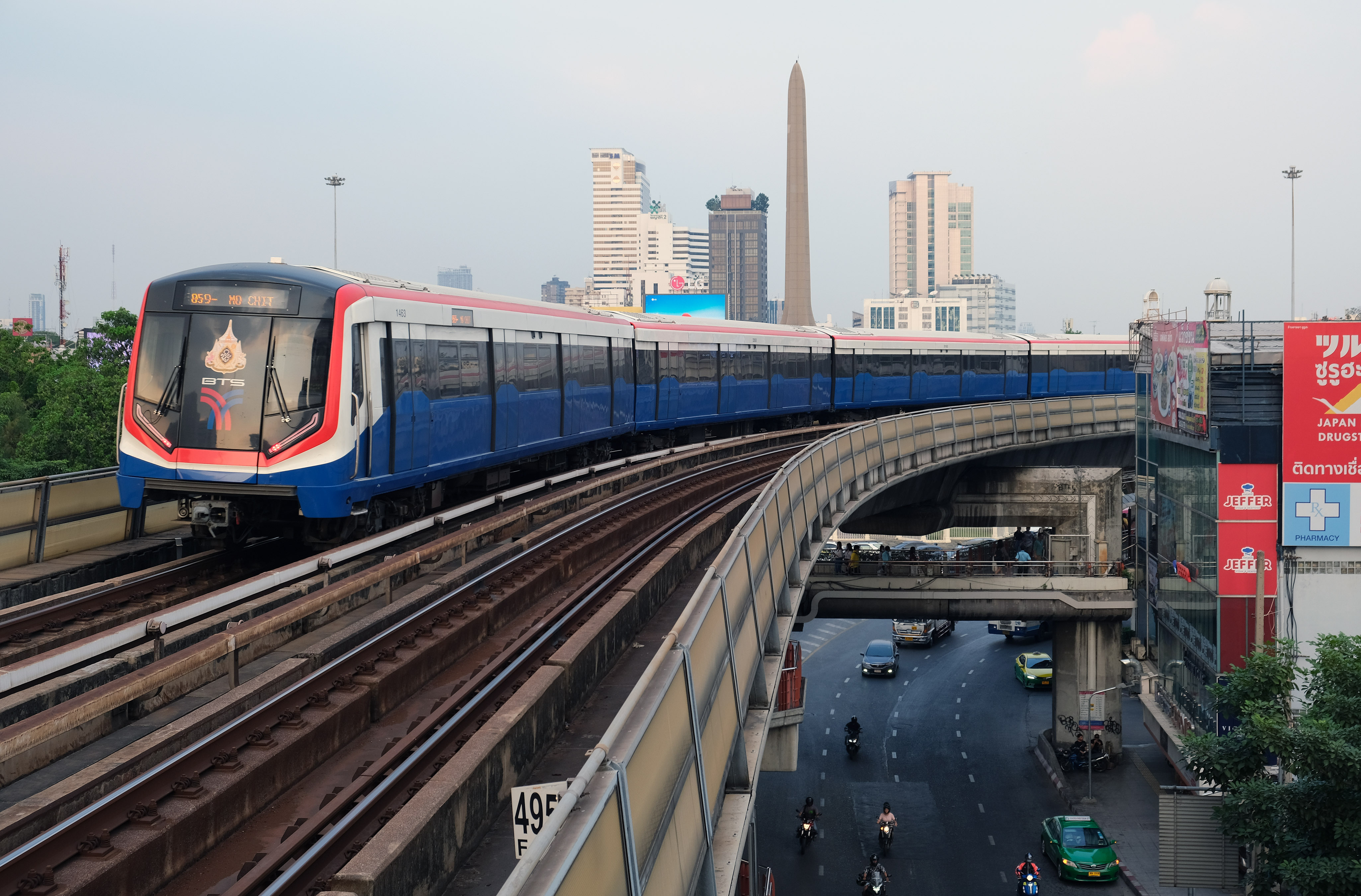
- Sukhumvit Line EMU-A2 train departing Victory Monument station

Overview
- Owner: Bangkok Metropolitan Administration
- Locale: Bangkok, Samut Prakan, and Pathum Thani
- Termini: Khu Khot; Kheha
- Stations: Total : 57 stations 47 (operational); 9 (planned); 1 (provisional)
- Color on map: Light Green

Service
- Type: Rapid transit
- System: BTS Skytrain
- Operator: Bangkok Mass Transit System Public Company Limited
- Depot(s): Mo Chit Depot (shared with BTS ) Khu Khot Depot (shared with BTS ) Kheha Depot
- Rolling stock: Siemens Modular Metro; EMU-A1: 35 four-car trains Siemens Bozankaya; EMU-A2: 22 four-car trains CNR Changchun Railway Vehicles; EMU-B1: 12 four-car trains CNR Changchun Railway Vehicles; EMU-B2: 5 four-car trains CRRC Changchun Railway Vehicles; EMU-B3: 24 four-car trains
- Daily ridership: 926,294 ( BTS and BTS ) 30 August 2024

History
- Commenced: 9 April 1992; 34 years ago
- Opened: 5 December 1999; 26 years ago
- Last extension: 16 December 2020; 5 years ago

Technical
- Line length: Total :69.07 km (42.92 mi); 51.17 km (31.80 mi) (operational); 17.9 km (11.1 mi) (planned)
- Character: Fully elevated
- Track gauge: 1,435 mm (4 ft 8 1/2 in) standard gauge
- Electrification: 750 V DC third rail
- Operating speed: 80 km/h (50 mph)
- Signalling: Former: Siemens Trainguard LZB700M fixed block ATC under ATO GoA 2 (STO); Current: Bombardier CITYFLO 450 moving block CBTC ATC under ATO GoA 2 (STO), with subsystems of ATP, ATS and CBI

The Elevated Train in Commemoration of HM the King's 6th Cycle Birthday 1st line (Thai: รถไฟฟ้าเฉลิมพระเกียรติ 6 รอบพระชนมพรรษา สาย 1), also known as Sukhumvit Line (Thai: สายสุขุมวิท), is one of the rapid transit lines of the BTS Skytrain System in Bangkok, Thailand. The line runs from Siam Station, where it interchanges with the Silom Line, and continues both northwards along Phaya Thai and Phahon Yothin Roads to Khu Khot in Lam Luk Ka District, Pathum Thani, and eastwards along Rama I, Phloen Chit and Sukhumvit Roads, through Bang Na District to Kheha Station in Samut Prakan.

The line was first opened on 5 December 1999, along with the Silom Line. Both lines are operated by the Bangkok Mass Transit System Public Company Limited under a 30-year concession from the Bangkok Metropolitan Administration. When it opened, the line ran from Mo Chit to On Nut covering a total distance of 16.7 km (10.4 mi) with 17 stations. As of October 2024, Sukhumvit Line is one of the main arteries of the Bangkok Mass Rapid Transit System with 900,000 daily passengers per day (combined with the Silom Line). The line rapidly expanded from 2011 until 2021, tripling its distance through three extension projects and reaching a total length of 51.17 km (31.80 mi) with 47 stations.

== History ==
=== Original plan ===
The Sukhumvit Line's initial proposal was for 12.8 km (8.0 mi) route running from N4 station to E9 station with the depot located at Lumphini Park near the Silom Line. However, this location for the depot faced backlash from the public opinion, which argued that it violated King Vajiravudh's intention in donating his land to establish Lumphini Park for the public. Additionally, there were protests demanding that the construction of both Skytrain lines be built underground instead of being fully elevated. Therefore, several alternative locations for the depot were considered, such as a vacant land plot in Soi Rangnam owned by the Crowned Property Bureau or the Phra Khanong pumping station in Sukhumvit 50. Ultimately, the Bangkok Metropolitan Administration decided to relocate the depot to the former site of the Northern Bus Terminal (commonly known as the Mo Chit Bus Terminal). With the decision made, the Sukhumvit Line route was extended from N4 station to N8 station. Several changes were made during the construction, as follows:

- N3, N4, E8, and E9 stations were changed from an island platform to side platforms.
- The fully operational year was pushed from the end of 1996 to the end of 1999.
- Station designs were drastically changed from the EIA reports.
- CEN station was moved from the east side of Chaloem Phao junction to the west side.
- E1 station was moved from the east side of the Chit Lom junction to the west side, in front of Mater Dei School, with the two entrances in front of the school being canceled due to protests from school staffs and students concerned about privacy, landscape, and air pollution issues.
- E2 station was originally located between Sukhumvit 2 and Soi Nana but was later moved to the west side of the Chaloem Maha Nakhon Expressway.
- E4 station was moved from the east side of the Asok junction to the west side.

=== Extensions ===
==== Bearing Extension ====
Construction started in August 2006 on a four-billion baht, 5.25 km (3.26 mi) extension from On Nut to Bearing which included 5 new stations The extension was funded by the BMA. The original scheduled opening date was mid-2009. However, a delay in tendering the contract for the electrical and signaling works resulted in a two-year delay.

The extension did not open until over two years later, on 12 August 2011. The delay in opening prompted the BMA to offer free travel on this extension until the end of 2011 as compensation.

==== Samut Prakan Extension ====
Construction started in April 2012 on a 12.6 km (7.8 mi), nine station extension from Bearing station to Kheha station. The extension was funded by the MRTA as it is outside BMA city limits, Bangkok Province. Construction was contracted to take 1,350 days and the extension was originally scheduled to open by early 2017. In April 2013, the MRTA awarded Ch Karnchang the contract for track laying and electrical systems.

In June 2014, civil works were stated to be 28.3 percent complete. In August 2016, the BMA agreed to take over the operation of the extension from MRTA. Delays over the agreement of how much the BMA should pay MRTA caused a delay in the commencement of test runs on the extension. Track works were 98% completed by November 2016. The total cost of the extension was estimated at 21.4 billion baht. In January 2017, it was announced that the opening of the extension could be further delayed to 2018-2019 due to budgetary concerns and ongoing disputes between the MRTA and BMA.

The first 1.2 km (0.75 mi) section of the extension to Samrong station opened on 3 April 2017. The full extension to Kheha opened on 6 December 2018.

==== Khu Khot Extension ====
An 11.4 km, 11 station northern extension from Mo Chit station to Saphan Mai in Don Mueang District had been planned since the Sukhumvit Line opened. Originally, this extension was scheduled to be completed by 2008. However, due to a combination of changes in government, a prolonged environmental study, and problems with locating a suitable train depot the extension was continually delayed. A further 16.5 km (10.3 mi), nine station extension from Saphan Mai to Khu Khot was also planned once the extension to Saphan Mai had been completed.

After multiple delays, in mid-2013 a decision was made to tender extensions (1) and (2) at the same time, by the end of 2013. However, the dissolution of parliament in November 2013 delayed this yet again. A tender was finally released in January 2014 with an April deadline before being delayed until late May 2014 due to concerns from bidders. A military coup in late-May 2014 suspended the bidding process whilst the military administration reviewed all major projects. In late June, the military administration affirmed that the tender would proceed before the end of 2014. In August 2014, the MRTA announced that the new tender deadline was 30 September 2014. Five bidders qualified and the successful bids were announced in December 2014. The tender specified a construction period of 1,350 days.

On 3 April 2015, MRTA signed four contracts for this extension:

Contract	Notes	Contractors	Length	Costs
1	Mo Chit to Saphan Mai	Italian-Thai Development	12.01 km (7.46 mi)	฿15,269 million
2	Saphan Mai to Khu Khot	UN-SH-CH joint-venture	6.11 km (3.80 mi)	฿6,657 million
3	Khu Khot Depot and Park & Ride buildings at Yaek Kor Por Aor and Khu Khot stations	STEC-AS joint-venture		฿4,019 million
4	Track laying and system design	STEC-AS joint-venture		฿2,841 million

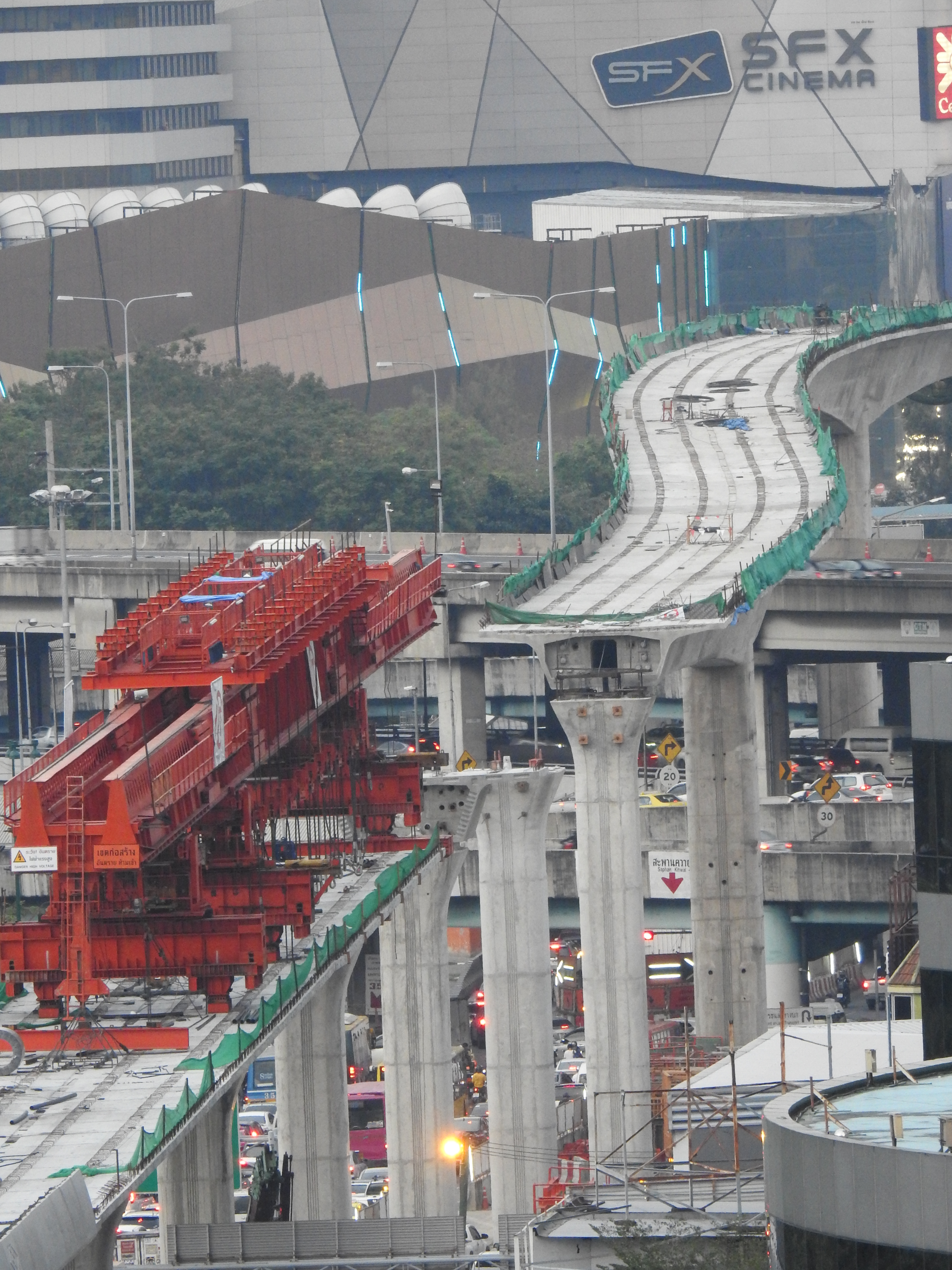
Construction of the viaduct before entering Ha Yaek Lat Phrao station in 2018

The MRTA, contactors and Thai Traffic Police met on 2 September 2015 and confirmed construction would begin on 8 September 2015. A flyover at Kasetsart was demolished, which commenced on 12 September 2015.

At 31 December 2017, the progress of civil works construction was at 53.31% according to the MRTA. As of April 2018, the MRTA stated that civil works progress had advanced to 63.27%. As of 30 September 2018, overall construction had progressed to 78.79%. By the end of March 2019, civil construction had nearly been completed having progressed to 99.42%.

Testing of the final 9.8 km, seven-station-section from Wat Phra Sri Mahathat (N17) to Khu Khot (N24) began on 5 October. The final section was officially opened on 16 December 2020 by the Prime Minister.

==== Tamru Extension (future) ====
There is a plan to extend Sukhumvit Line from Kheha to Tamru for 10.1 km (6.3 mi), including 5 additional stations: Sawangkhaniwat, Mueang Boran, Si Chan Pradit, Bang Pu, and Tamru. This extension has been suspended indefinitely until clarity is reached regarding passenger guarantees.

Code	Station Name		Planned Opening	Platform Type
Code	English	Thai	Planned Opening	Platform Type
↓ Continue from Kheha ↓
	Sawangkhaniwat	สวางคนิวาส	TBA	Side
	Mueang Boran	เมืองโบราณ	TBA	Side
	Si Chan Pradit	ศรีจันทร์ประดิษฐ์	TBA	Side
	Bang Pu	บางปู	TBA	Side
	Tamru	ตำหรุ	TBA	Side

==== Lam Luk Ka Extension (future) ====
There is a plan to extend Sukhumvit Line from Khu Khot Station eastwards for 7.8 km (4.8 mi), including four additional stations: Khlong Sam, Khlong Si, Khlong Ha, and Eastern Ring Road-Lam Luk Ka. This extension has been suspended indefinitely until clarity is reached regarding passenger guarantees.

Code	Station Name		Planned Opening	Platform Type
Code	English	Thai	Planned Opening	Platform Type
↓ Continue from Khu Khot ↓
	Khlong Sam	คลองสาม	TBA	Side
	Khlong Si	คลองสี่	TBA	Side
	Khlong Ha	คลองห้า	TBA	Side
	Eastern Ring Road-Lam Luk Ka	วงแหวนตะวันออกลำลูกกา	TBA	Side

== Opening timeline ==
Date	Project	Notes
5 December 1999	Bangkok Transit System	Full commercial service was commenced from Mo Chit to On Nut stations along with the Silom Line.
12 August 2011	Bearing Extension	Service extended to Bearing station.
14 May 2010		Sukhumvit Line was closed from 17.00 onwards due to 2010 Thai military crackdown.
29 May 2010		Resumed normal service.
22 May 2014		Sukhumvit Line operated with limited hours from 6:00 to 21:00 due to the curfew, which was a result of the 2014 Thai coup d'état.
28 May 2014		Service hours were extended to 06.00-23.00
14 June 2014		Resumed normal service.
3 April 2017	Samut Prakan Extension	Service extended to Samrong station.
6 December 2018	Samut Prakan Extension	Shuttle service has been deployed from Samrong to Kheha stations.
11 May 2019	Samut Prakan Extension	Full commercial service was commenced from Mo Chit to Kheha stations.
9 August 2019	Khu Khot Extension	Service extended to Ha Yaek Lat Phrao station.
4 December 2019	Khu Khot Extension	Service extended to Kasetsart University station.
5 June 2020	Khu Khot Extension	Service extended to Wat Phra Si Mahathat station.
17 October 2020		Sukhumvit Line was temporarily closed from 15.00 due to the 2020–2021 Thai protests.
18 October 2020		Mo Chit, Ha Yaek Lat Phrao, Phahon Yothin 24, Asok, Udom Suk, and Bang Na stations were temporarily closed due to the protests from 14.30
16 December 2020	Khu Khot Extension	Service extended to Khu Khot station.
28 March 2025		All services were halted because of the 2025 Myanmar earthquake.
29 March 2025		Resumed normal service.

== Stations ==
Code	Station Name		Image	Opened	Platform Type	Park & Ride	Transfers	Notes
Code	English	Thai	Image	Opened	Platform Type	Park & Ride	Transfers	Notes
	Khu Khot	คูคต		16 December 2020; 5 years ago	Side	√		
	Yaek Kor Por Aor	แยก คปอ.		16 December 2020; 5 years ago	Side	√		
	Royal Thai Air Force Museum	พิพิธภัณฑ์กองทัพอากาศ		16 December 2020; 5 years ago	Side	-		
	Bhumibol Adulyadej Hospital	โรงพยาบาลภูมิพลอดุลยเดช		16 December 2020; 5 years ago	Side	-		
	Saphan Mai	สะพานใหม่		16 December 2020; 5 years ago	Side	-		
	Sai Yud	สายหยุด		16 December 2020; 5 years ago	Side	-		
	Phahon Yothin 59	พหลโยธิน 59		16 December 2020; 5 years ago	Side	-		
	Wat Phra Sri Mahathat	วัดพระศรีมหาธาตุ		5 June 2020; 6 years ago	Island	-	Interchange station with MRT	
	11th Infantry Regiment	กรมทหารราบที่ 11		5 June 2020; 6 years ago	Side	-		
	Bang Bua	บางบัว		5 June 2020; 6 years ago	Side	-		
	Royal Forest Department	กรมป่าไม้		5 June 2020; 6 years ago	Side	-		
	Kasetsart University	มหาวิทยาลัยเกษตรศาสตร์		4 December 2019; 6 years ago	Side	-	Connecting station to MRT (future)	
	Sena Nikhom	เสนานิคม		4 December 2019; 6 years ago	Side	-		
	Ratchayothin	รัชโยธิน		4 December 2019; 6 years ago	Side	-	Proposed connecting station to MRT . (Yellow Line (Bangkok) § Northern extension)	
	Phahon Yothin 24	พหลโยธิน 24		4 December 2019; 6 years ago	Side	-	Proposed connecting station to MRT . (Yellow Line (Bangkok) § Northern extension)	
	Ha Yaek Lat Phrao	ห้าแยกลาดพร้าว		9 August 2019; 6 years ago	Island	-	Connecting station to Phahon Yothin for MRT , via a 330-metre elevated pedestrian walkway.	
	Mo Chit	หมอชิต		5 December 1999; 26 years ago	Side	√	Connecting station to Chatuchak Park for MRT	
	Saphan Khwai	สะพานควาย		5 December 1999; 26 years ago	Side	-		
	Sena Ruam	เสนาร่วม		TBA	Side	-		Provisional station
	Ari	อารีย์		5 December 1999; 26 years ago	Side	-		
	Sanam Pao	สนามเป้า		5 December 1999; 26 years ago	Side	-		
	Victory Monument	อนุสาวรีย์ชัยสมรภูมิ		5 December 1999; 26 years ago	Side	-		
	Phaya Thai	พญาไท		5 December 1999; 26 years ago	Side	-	Connecting station to; • ARL • SRT (future)	
	Ratchathewi	ราชเทวี		5 December 1999; 26 years ago	Side	-	Connecting station to MRT (under construction)	
	Siam	สยาม		5 December 1999; 26 years ago	Stacked Island	-	Cross-platform interchange with BTS	
	Chit Lom	ชิดลม		5 December 1999; 26 years ago	Side	-		
	Phloen Chit	เพลินจิต		5 December 1999; 26 years ago	Side	-		
	Nana	นานา		5 December 1999; 26 years ago	Side	-		
	Asok	อโศก		5 December 1999; 26 years ago	Side	-	Connecting station to Sukhumvit for MRT	
	Phrom Phong	พร้อมพงษ์		5 December 1999; 26 years ago	Side	-		
	Thong Lo	ทองหล่อ		5 December 1999; 26 years ago	Side	-		
	Ekkamai	เอกมัย		5 December 1999; 26 years ago	Side	-	Connecting station to MRL (north section; future)	
	Phra Khanong	พระโขนง		5 December 1999; 26 years ago	Side	-	Connecting station to MRL (south section; future)	
	On Nut	อ่อนนุช		5 December 1999; 26 years ago	Side	-		
	Bang Chak	บางจาก		12 August 2011; 14 years ago	Side	-		
	Punnawithi	ปุณณวิถี		12 August 2011; 14 years ago	Side	-		
	Udom Suk	อุดมสุข		12 August 2011; 14 years ago	Side	-		
	Bang Na	บางนา		12 August 2011; 14 years ago	Side	-	Connecting station to Bang Na-Suvarnabhumi LRT (future)	
	Bearing	แบริ่ง		12 August 2011; 14 years ago	Side	-		
	Samrong	สำโรง		3 April 2017; 9 years ago	Island	-	Interchange station to MRT via transfer gates	
	Pu Chao	ปู่เจ้า		6 December 2018; 7 years ago	Side	-		
	Chang Erawan	ช้างเอราวัณ		6 December 2018; 7 years ago	Side	-		
	Royal Thai Naval Academy	โรงเรียนนายเรือ		6 December 2018; 7 years ago	Side	-		
	Pak Nam	ปากน้ำ		6 December 2018; 7 years ago	Side	-		
	Srinagarindra	ศรีนครินทร์		6 December 2018; 7 years ago	Side	-		
	Phraek Sa	แพรกษา		6 December 2018; 7 years ago	Side	-		
	Sai Luat	สายลวด		6 December 2018; 7 years ago	Side	-		
	Kheha	เคหะฯ		6 December 2018; 7 years ago	Side	√		

== Infrastructure ==
=== Depot ===
The Sukhumvit Line has three depots: Mo Chit Depot, Khu Khot Depot, and Kheha Depot.

Mo Chit Depot serves as the central operations center for the BTS Skytrain network. It is located near Mo Chit Station, opposite Chatuchak Park, and was built as part of the original phase of the BTS Skytrain System, completed in 1999.

Khu Khot Depot, situated in the Sai Mai District of Bangkok near Khu Khot Station, was constructed as part of the Khu Khot Extension and was completed in 2019.

The third facility, Kheha Depot, is located in Mueang Samut Prakan District, Samut Prakan Province. It was built alongside the Samut Prakan Extension and completed in 2018.

Both Mo Chit and Khu Khot Depots are also shared with the Silom Line. Trains from these depots operate regular service on the Sukhumvit Line before switching to the Silom Line at Siam Station, continuing until they terminate at Bang Wa Station.

=== Park & Ride ===
Sukhumvit Line offers five parking lots located at Mo Chit, Victory Monument, Asok, and Samrong stations. In addition, Park & Ride buildings owned and operated by the Mass Rapid Transit Authority of Thailand are available at Khu Khot, Yaek Kor Por Aor, and Kheha stations.

=== Station ===
There are 55 stations on the Sukhumvit Line, all of which are elevated. Most stations feature a side platform layout, with the exceptions of Ha Yaek Lat Phrao and Samrong stations, which have island platforms. Siam Station is unique with a stacked island platform layout, allowing for a cross-platform interchange with the Silom Line.

Stations on the Sukhumvit Line are generally 150 meters in length and are equipped with half-height platform screen doors at most locations. However, some stations—such as Mo Chit, Saphan Khwai, Ari, Sanam Pao, Ratchathewi, Phloen Chit, Nana, Ekkamai, Phra Khanong, Bang Chak, Punnawithi, Udom Suk, Bang Na, and Bearing—do not have platform screen doors.

=== Rolling stock ===
Rolling stock of Sukhumvit Line

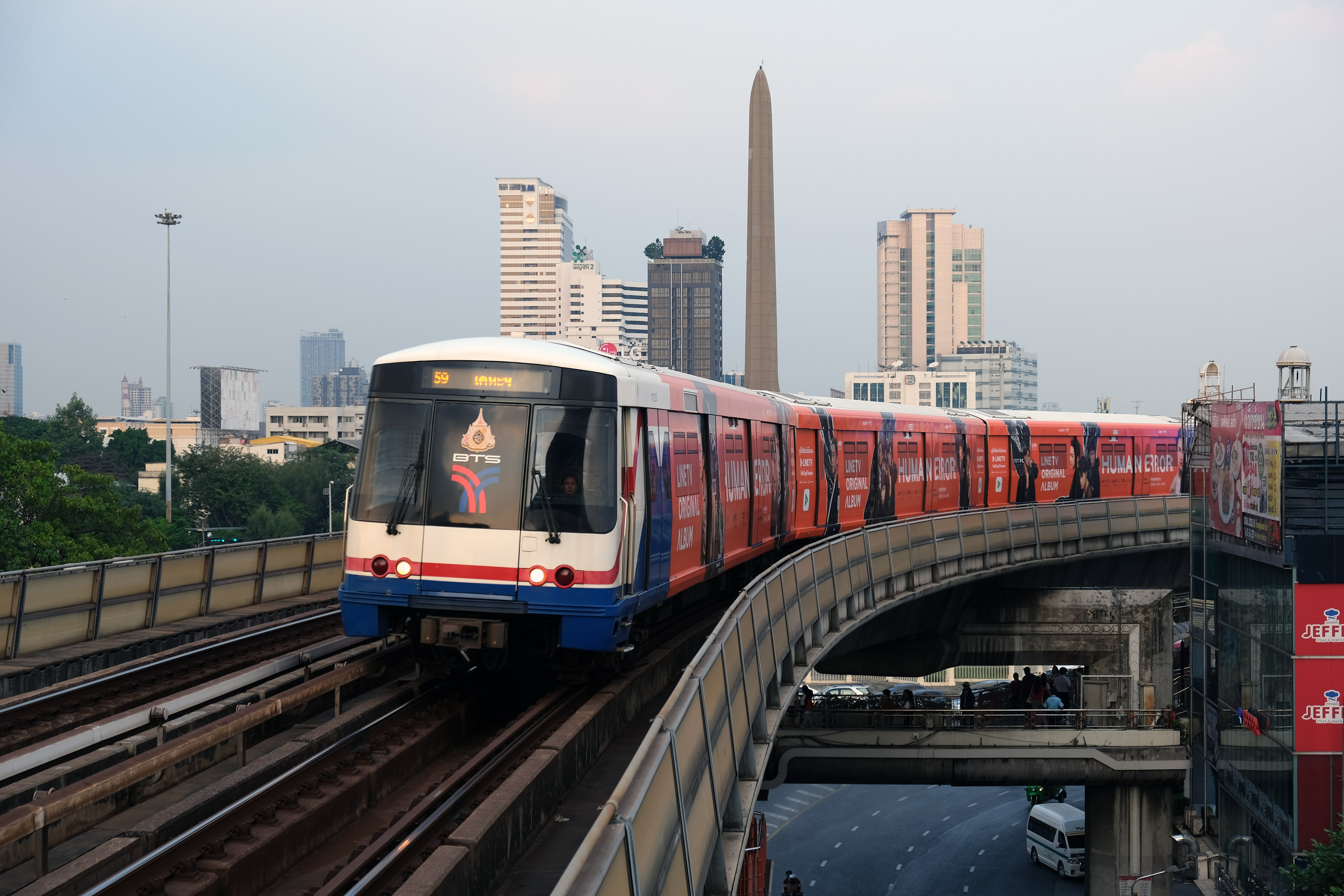
EMU-A1 approaching Victory Monument station

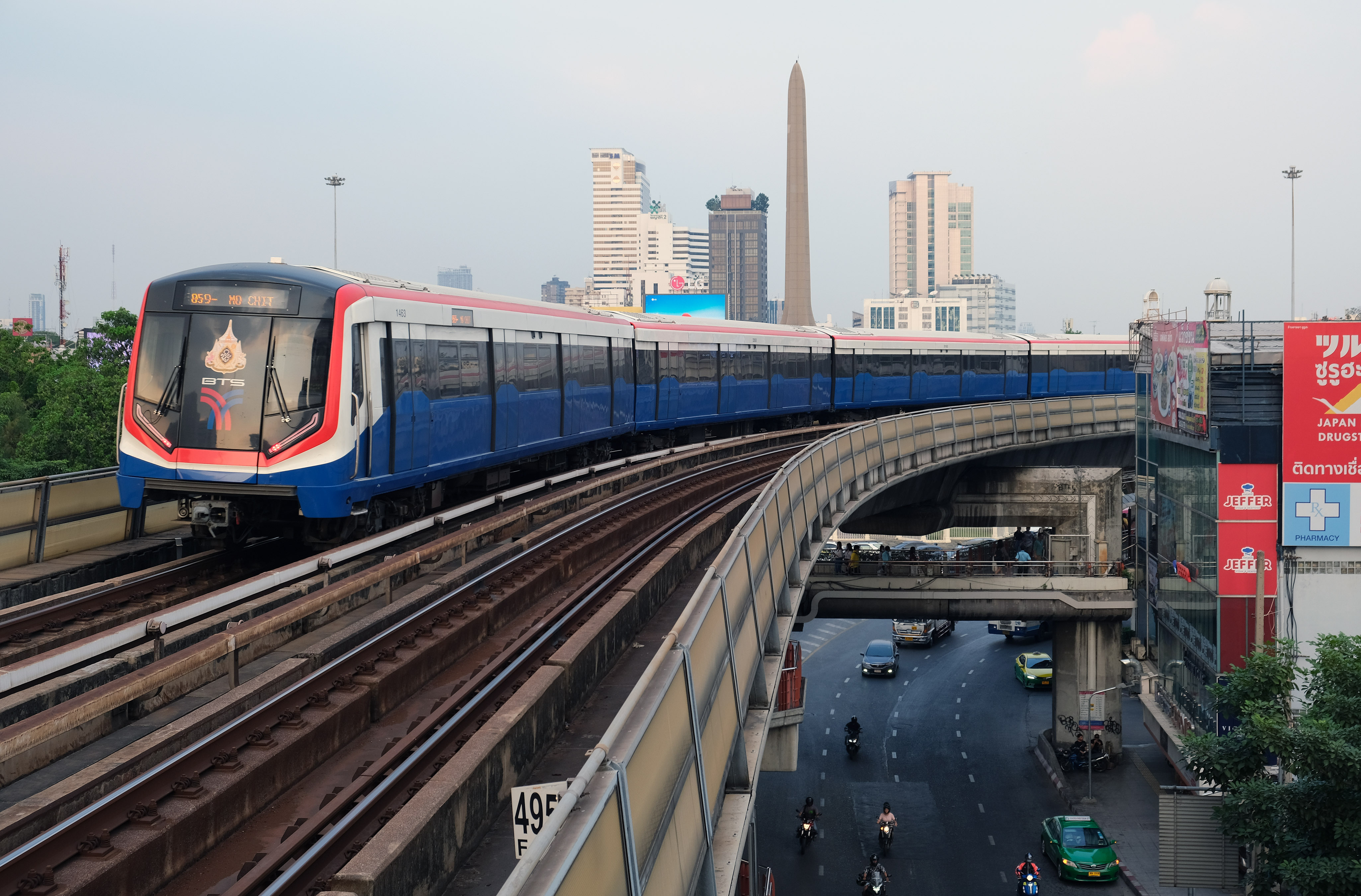
EMU-A2 heading towards Sanam Pao station

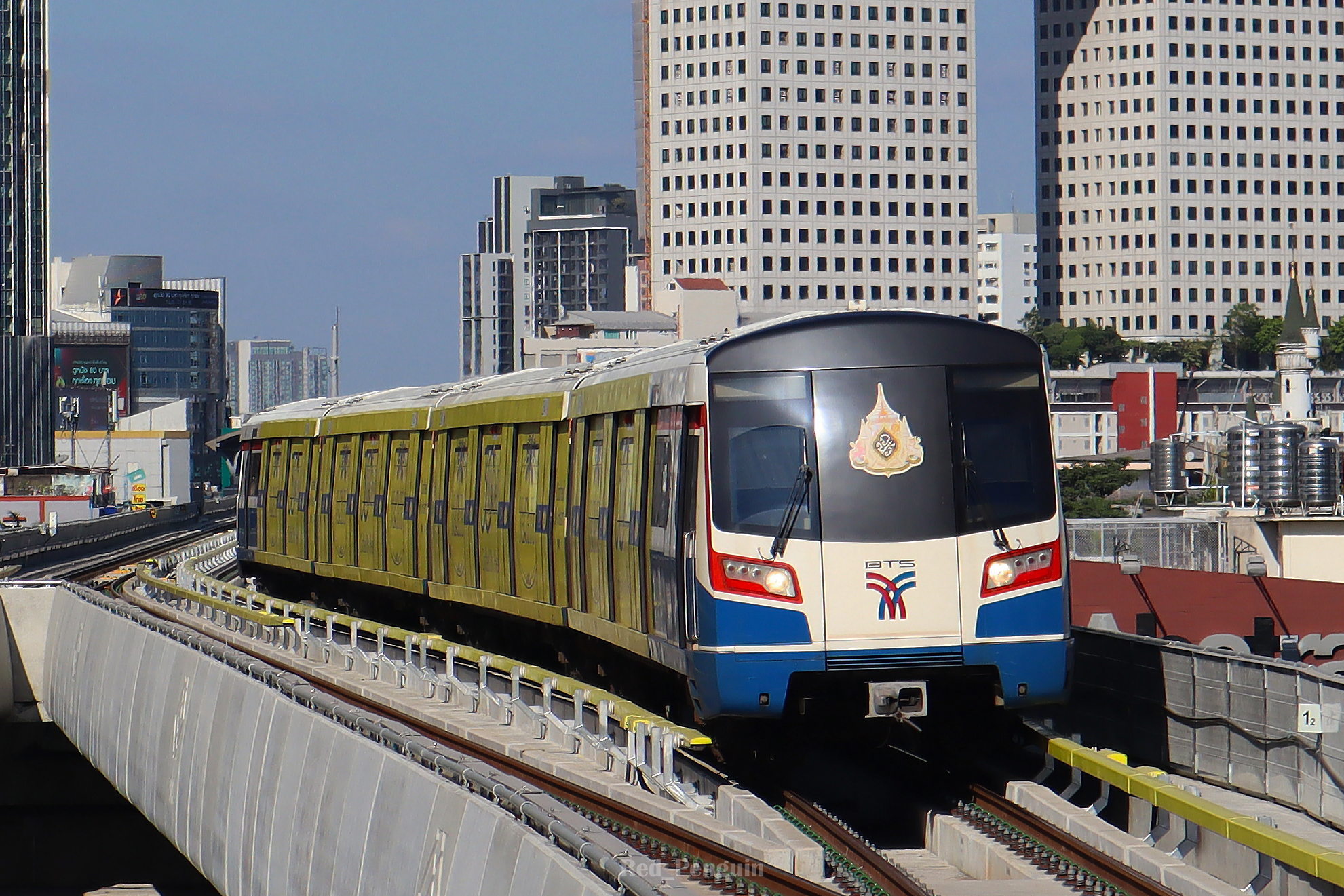
EMU-B1/B2 approaching Ha Yaek Lat Phrao station

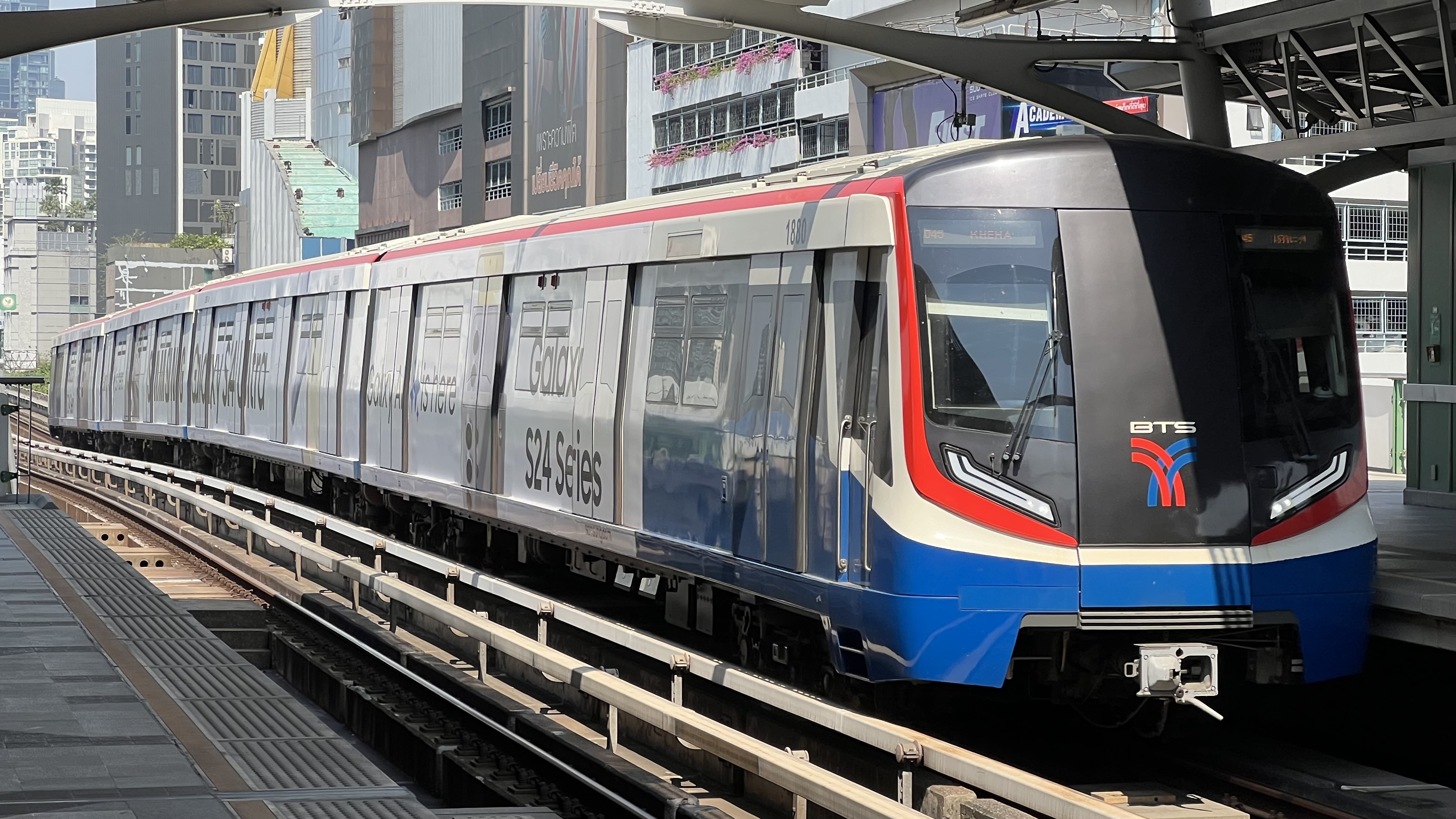
EMU-B3 at Ekkamai station

== Operation ==
The Sukhumvit Line operates from 06:00 to 24:00 every day. During rush hour, there are two main service patterns:

- Full Line operation from Khu Khot to Kheha
- Short-run train from Mo Chit to Samrong

Apart from these two service patterns, some trains might terminate at Kasetsart University and Ha Yaek Lat Phrao or operate as through-running trains to/from Bang Wa station on the Silom Line.

=== Headways ===
Sukhumvit Line headway
Time	Section	Headway (Minutes:Seconds)
Monday - Friday
06:00 - 07:00	Full Line	05:00
07:00 - 09:00	Mo Chit - Samrong	02:40
07:00 - 09:00	Full Line	05:20
09:00 - 09:30	Full Line	03:35
09:30 - 16:00	Full Line	06:30
16:00 - 16:30	Full Line	04:25
16:30 - 20:00	Mo Chit - Samrong	02:40
16:30 - 20:00	Full Line	05:20
20:00 - 21:00	Full Line	04:25
21:00 - 22:00	Full Line	06:00
22:00 - 24:00	Full Line	08:00
Saturday to Sunday and Public Holiday
06:00 - 08:00	Full Line	07:00
08:00 - 11:00	Full Line	05:55
11:00 - 21:00	Mo Chit - Samrong	04:30
11:00 - 21:00	Full Line	06:00
21:00 - 22:00	Full Line	07:00
22:00 - 24:00	Full Line	08:00

== Gallery ==
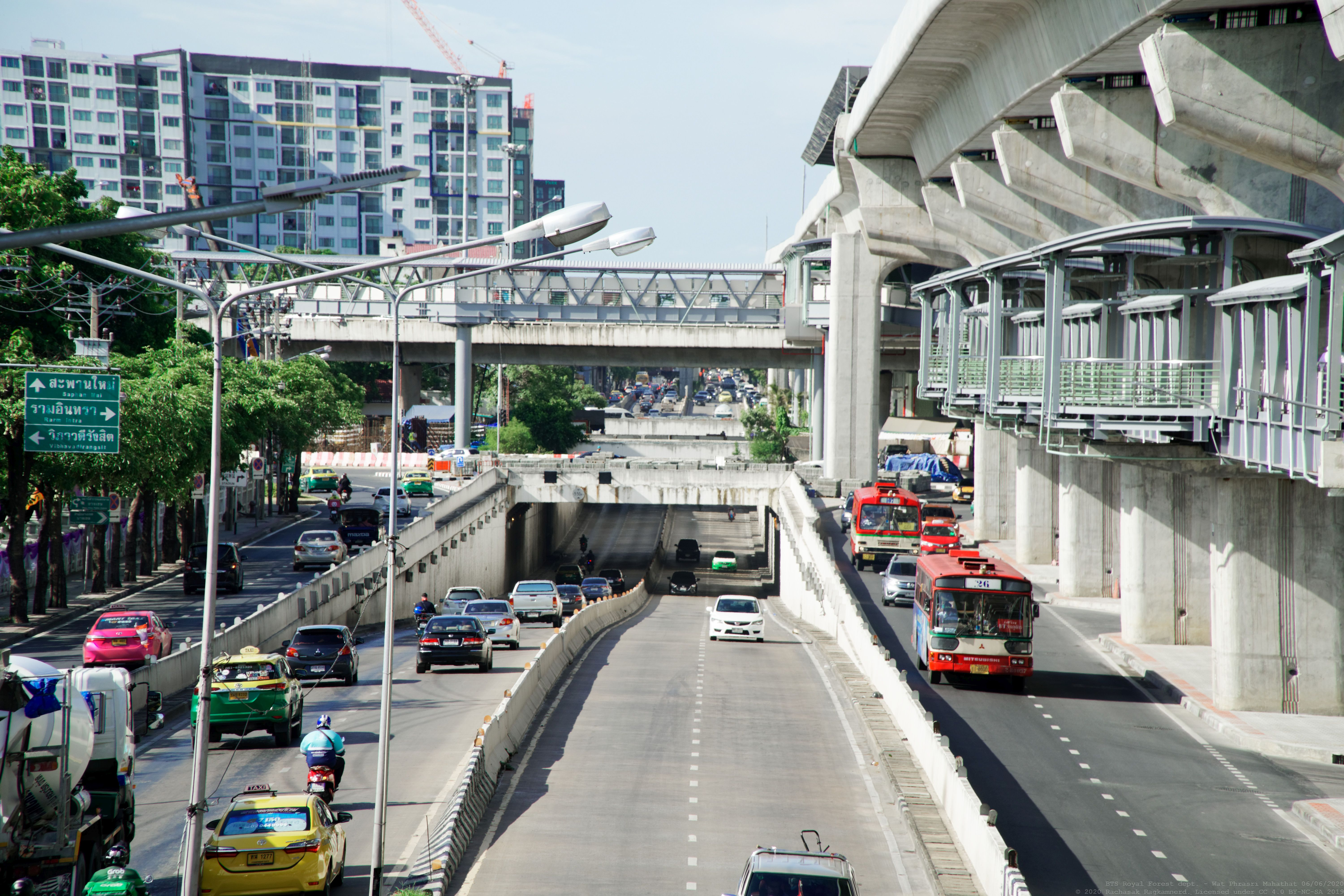
Sukhumvit Line viaduct at Lak Si roundabout

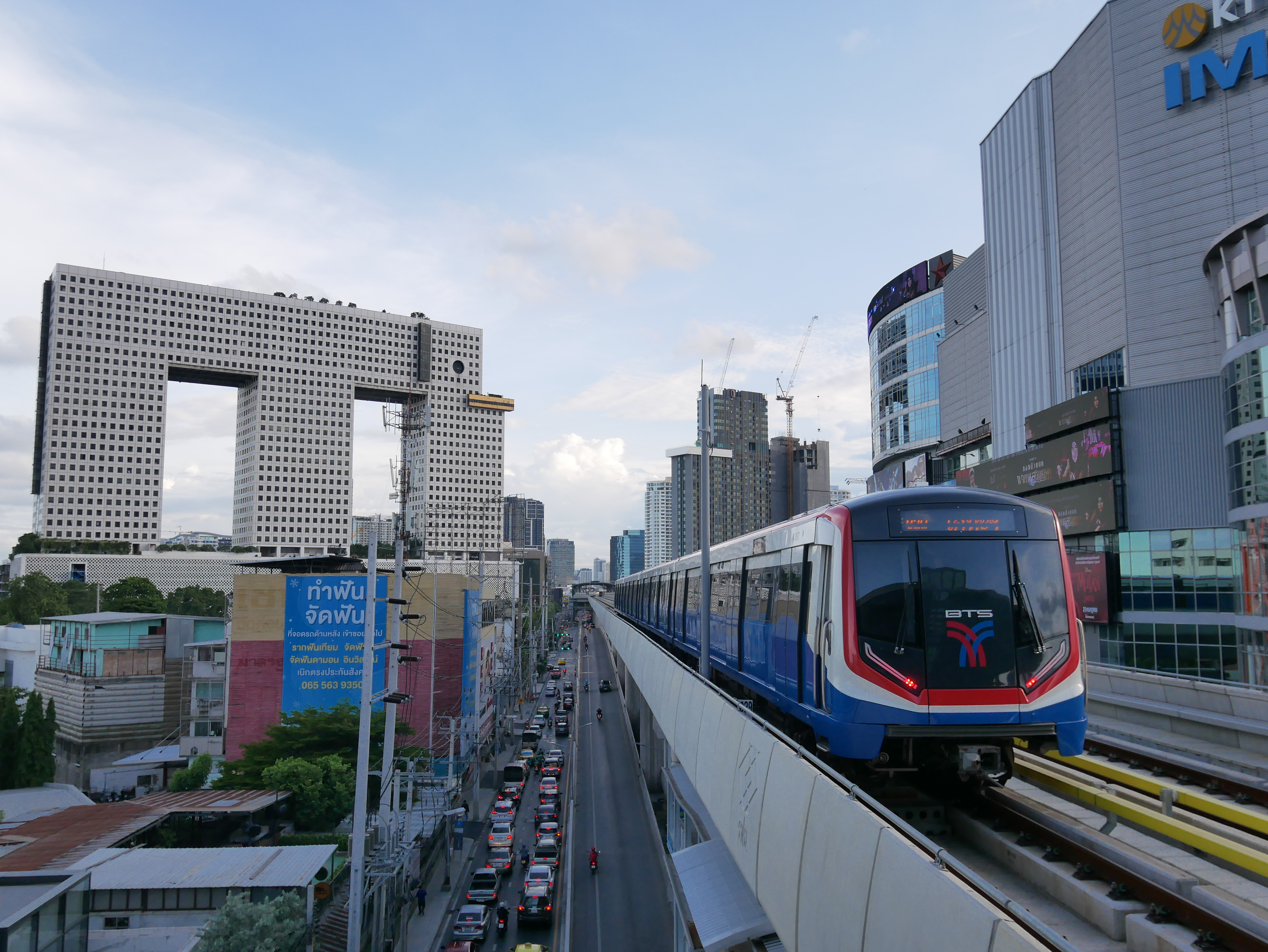
EMU-A2 with Elephant Building behind at Ratchayothin station

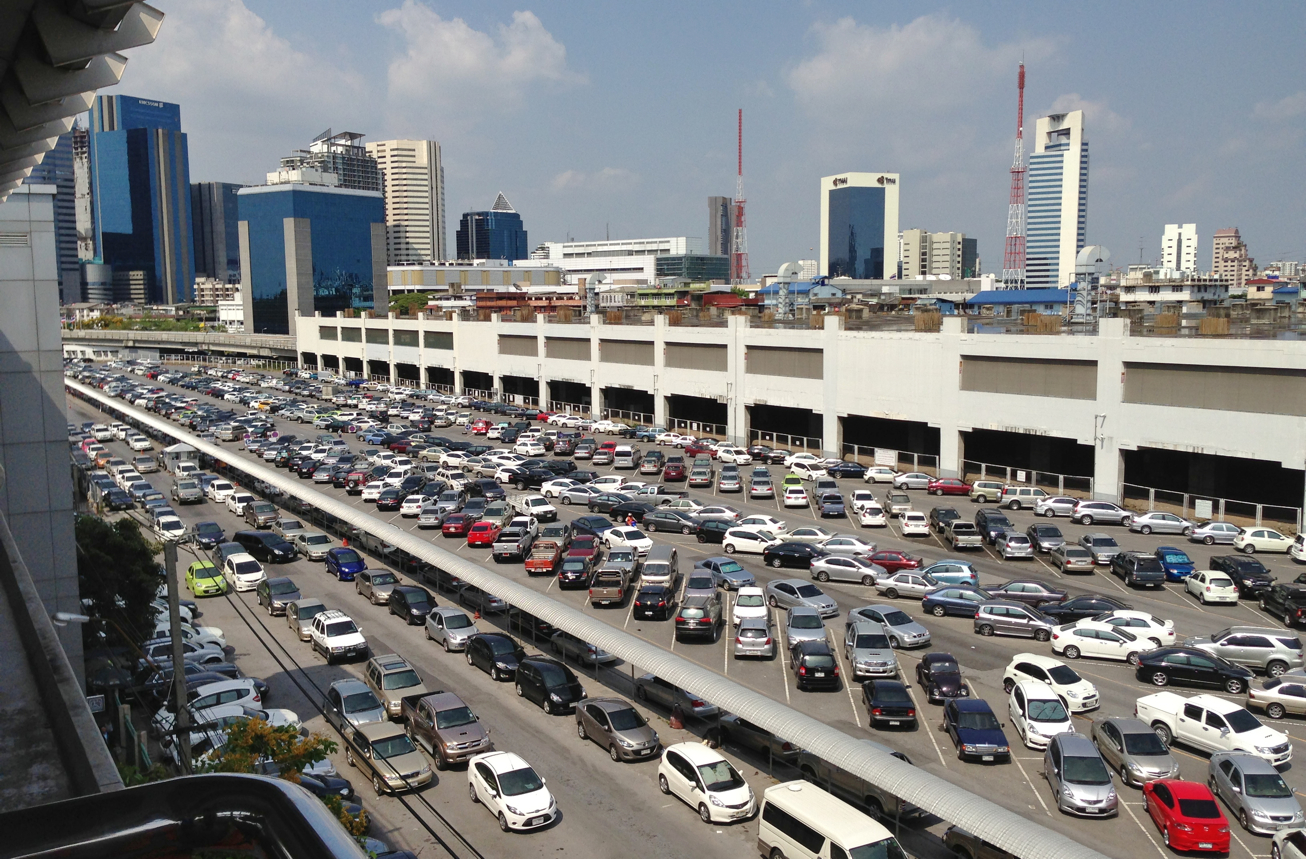
Mo Chit Depot in 2013

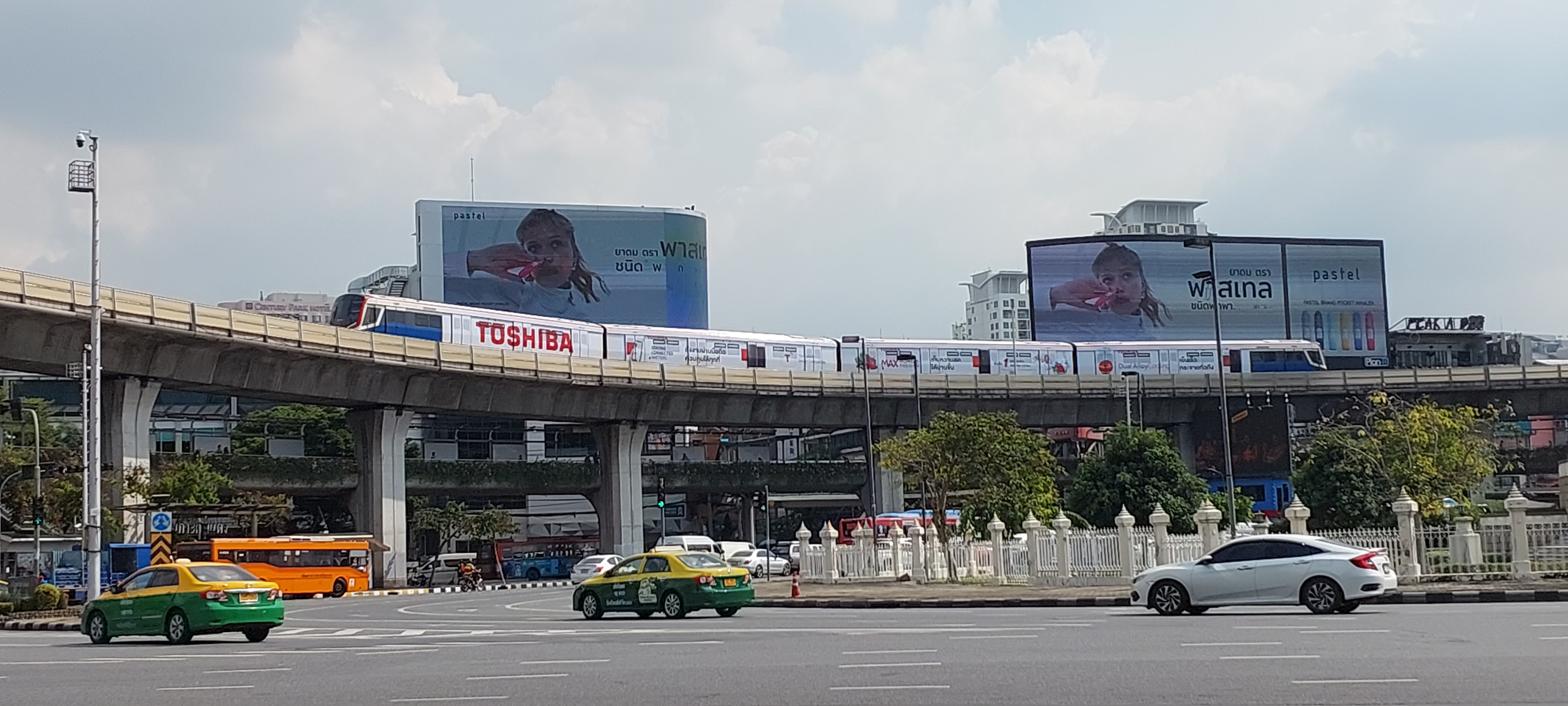
EMU-B3 at Victory Monument

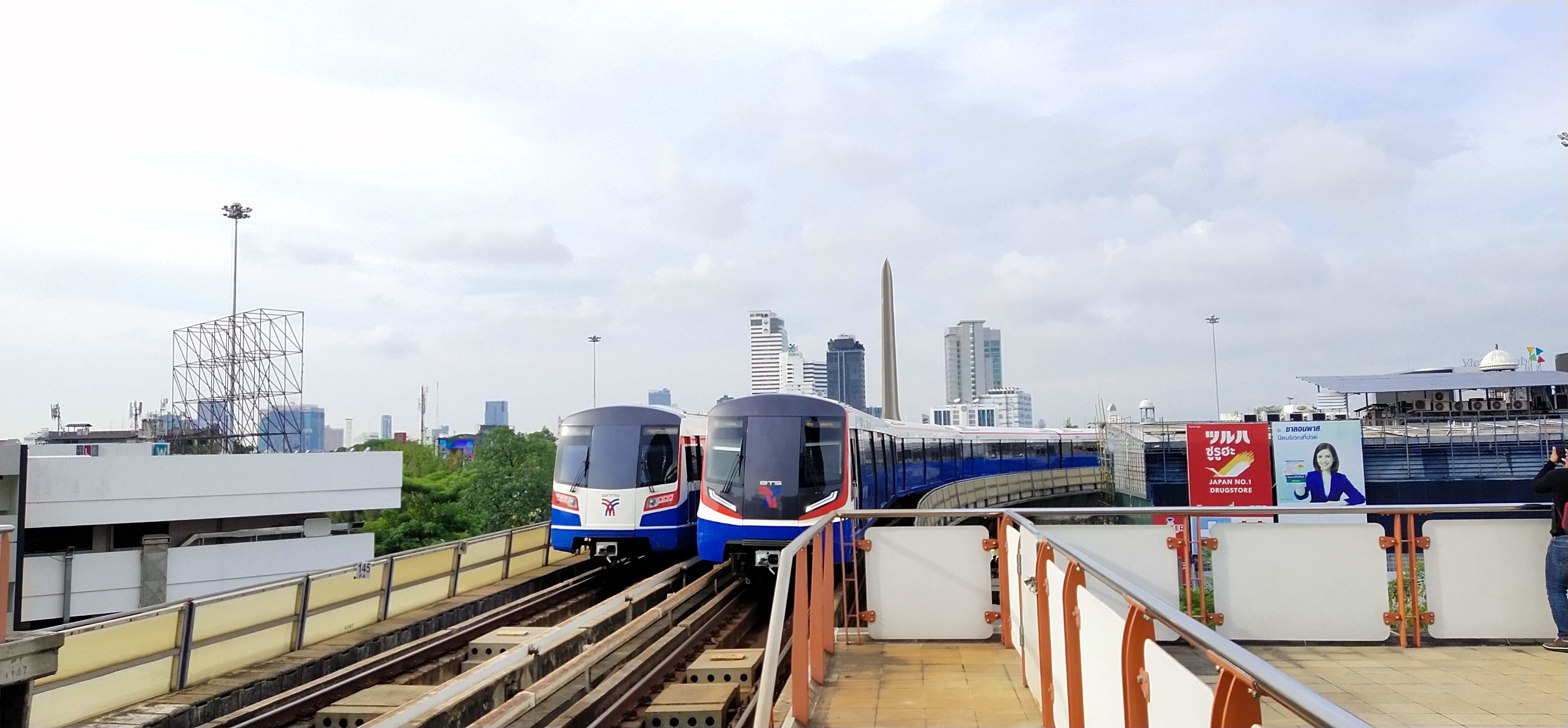
EMU-B1/B2 (left) and EMU-B3 at Victory Monument station

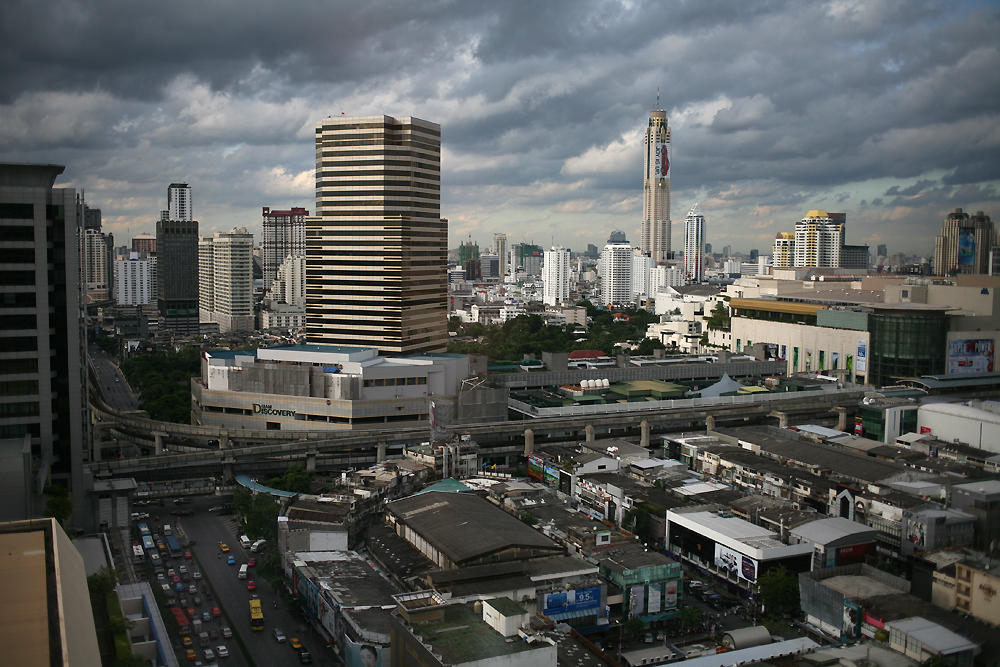
View of Pathum Wan district

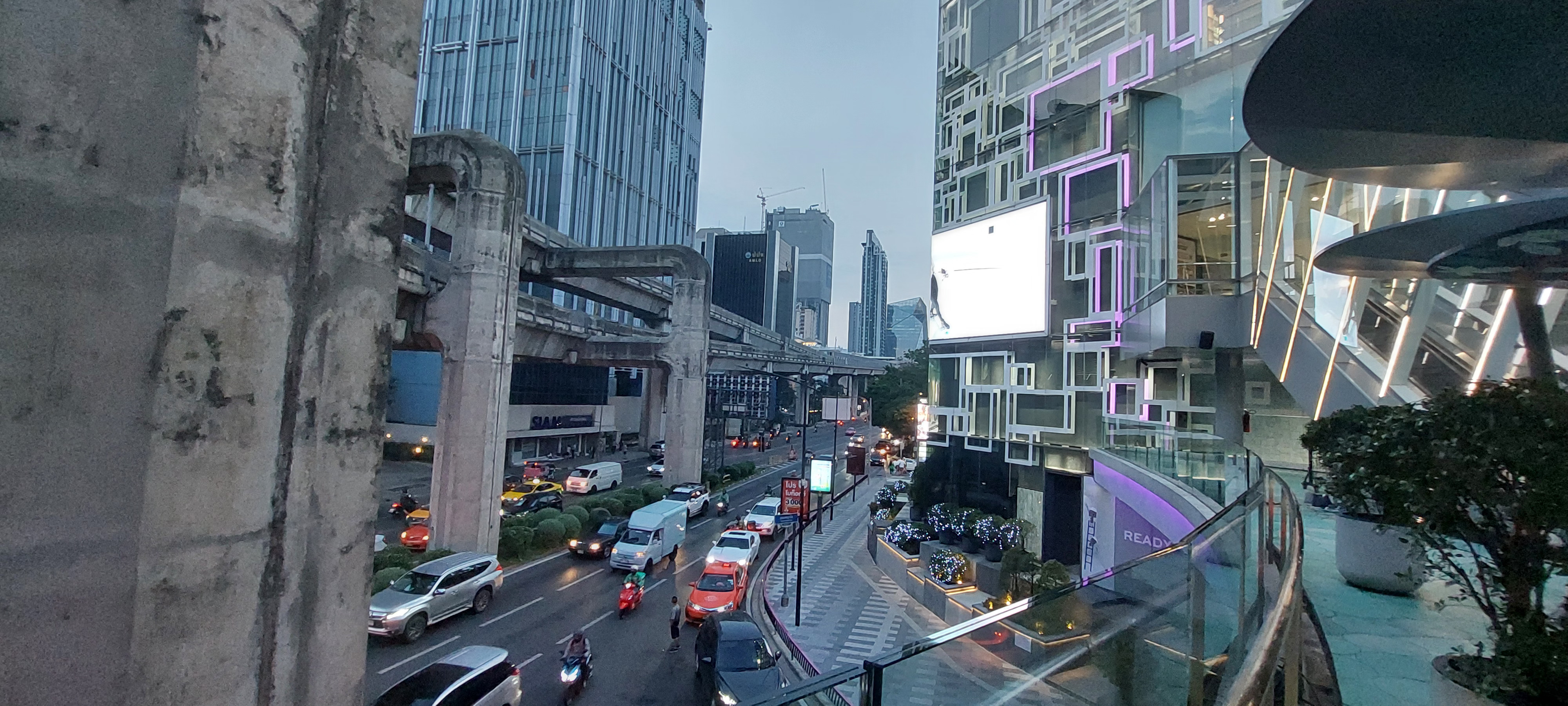
Sukhumvit Line viaduct from Pathum Wan Skywalk

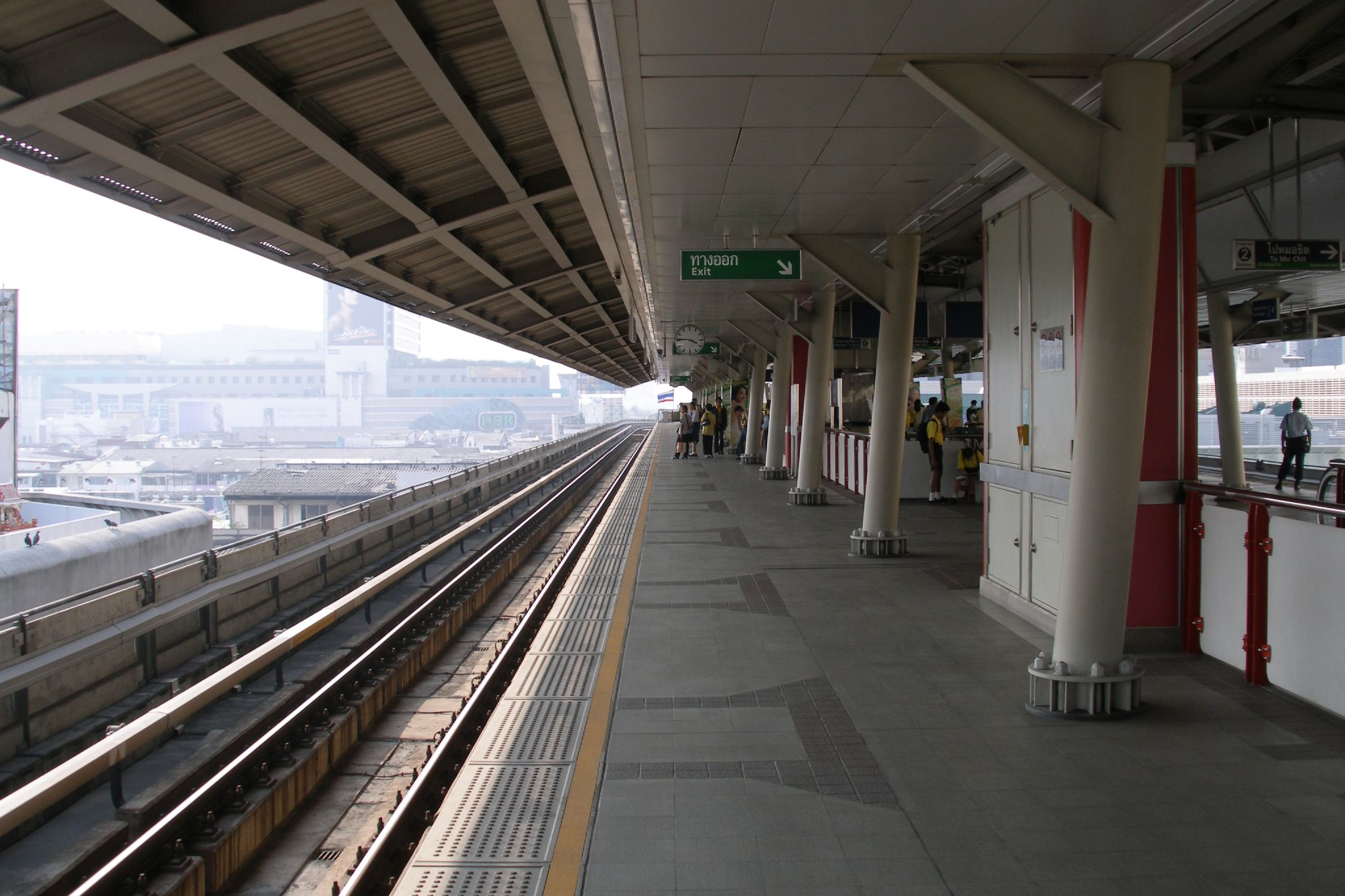
The upper-level platform at Siam station in 2007, before the installation of platform screen doors

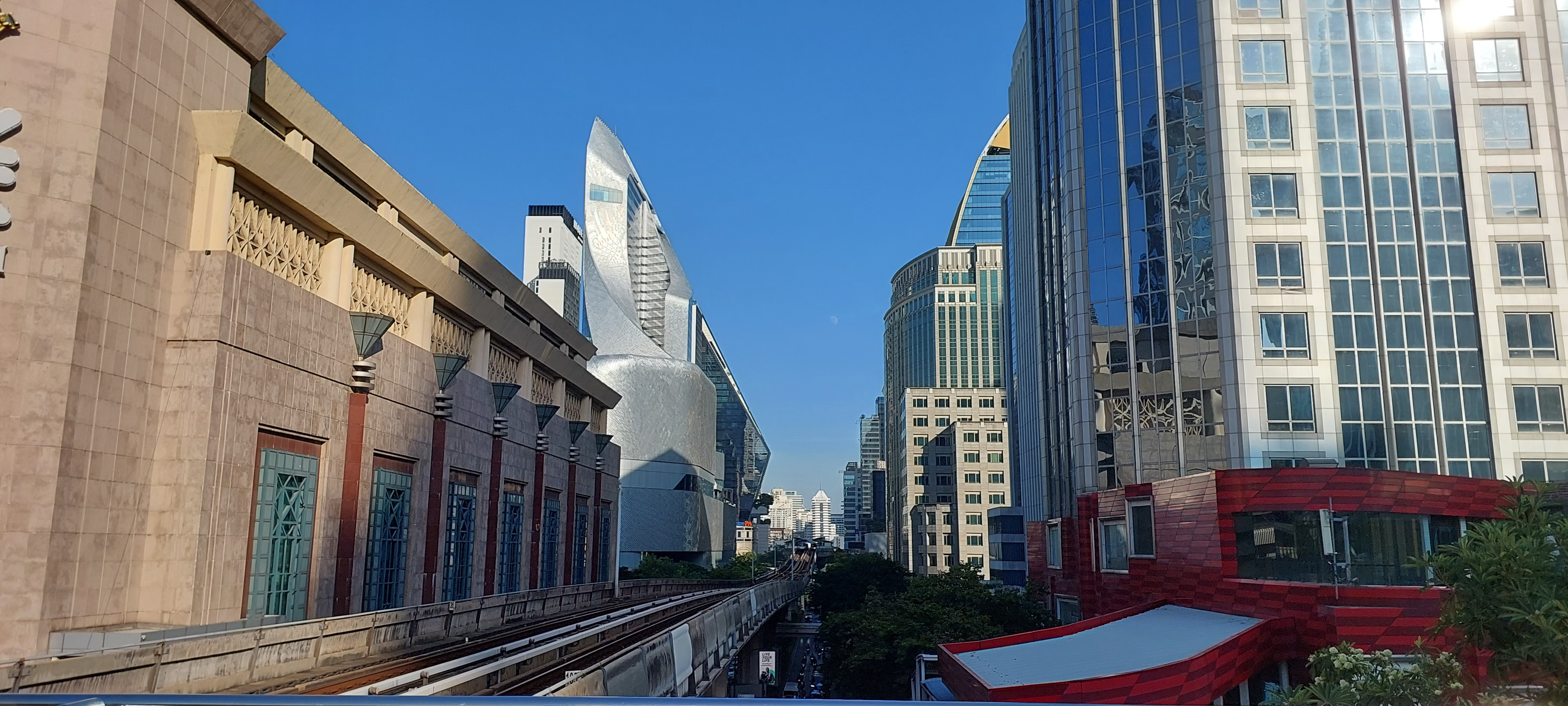
View from Chit Lom station

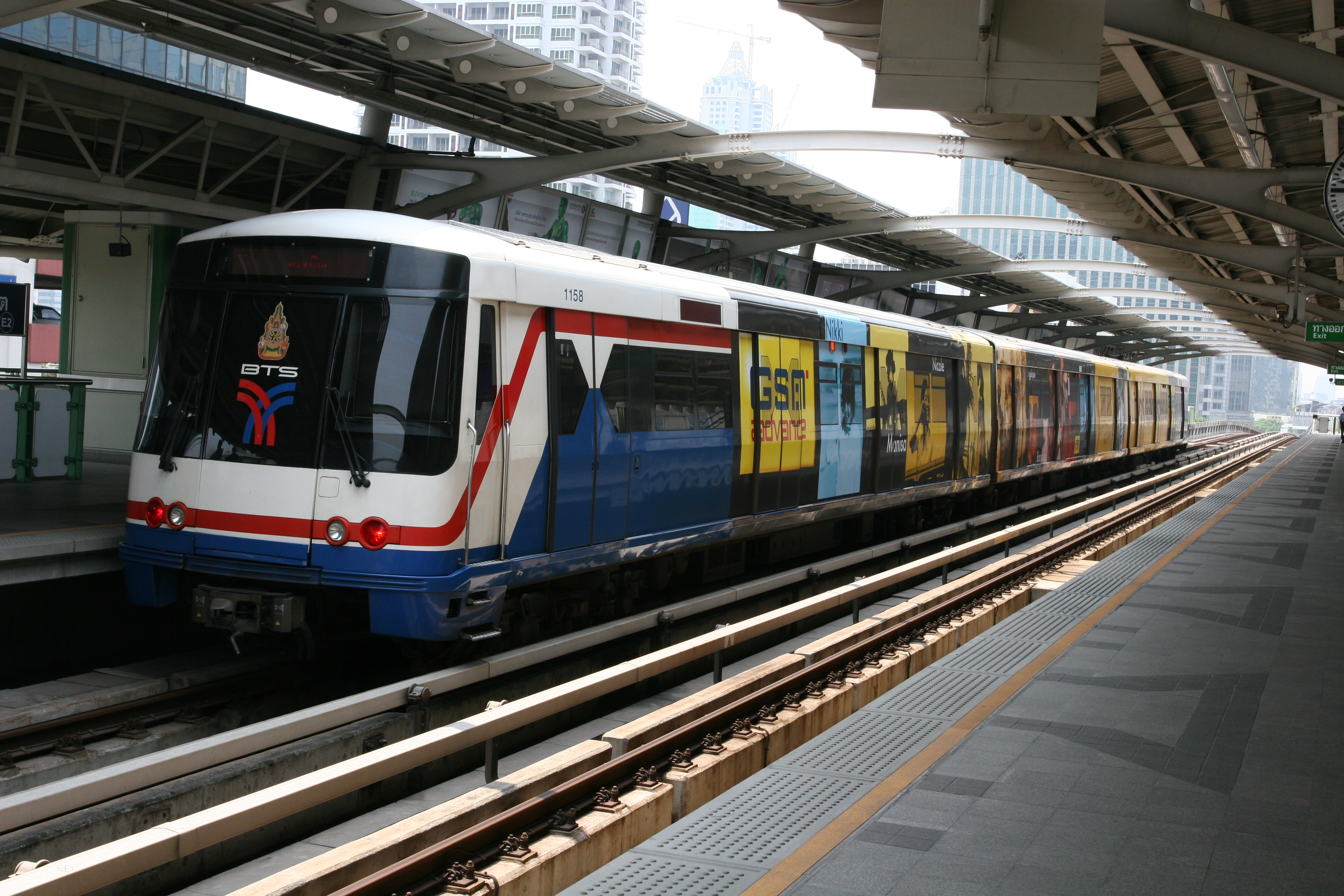
3-cars EMU-A1 from 2007

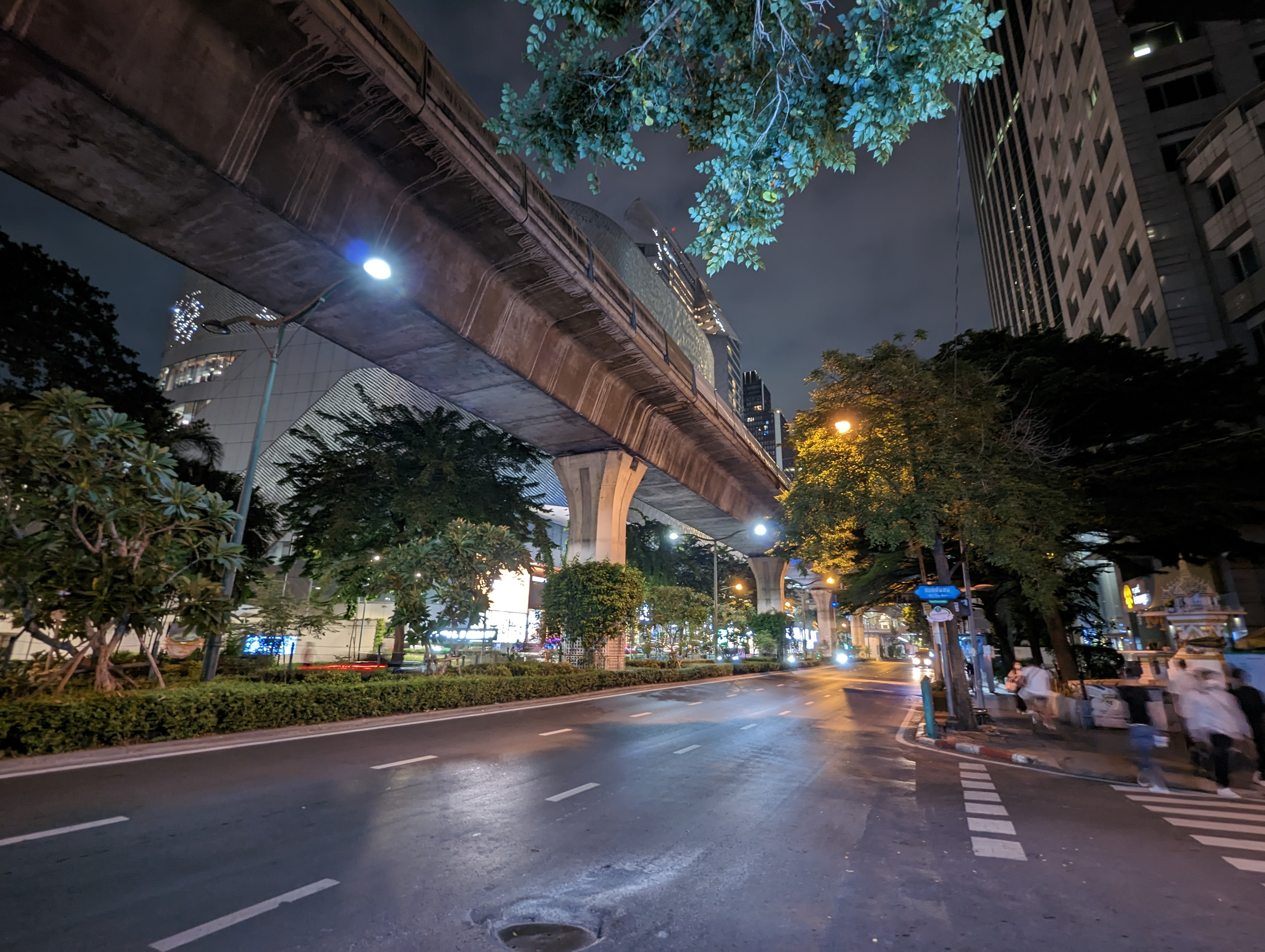
Phloen Chit Road with Sukhumvit Line viaduct above

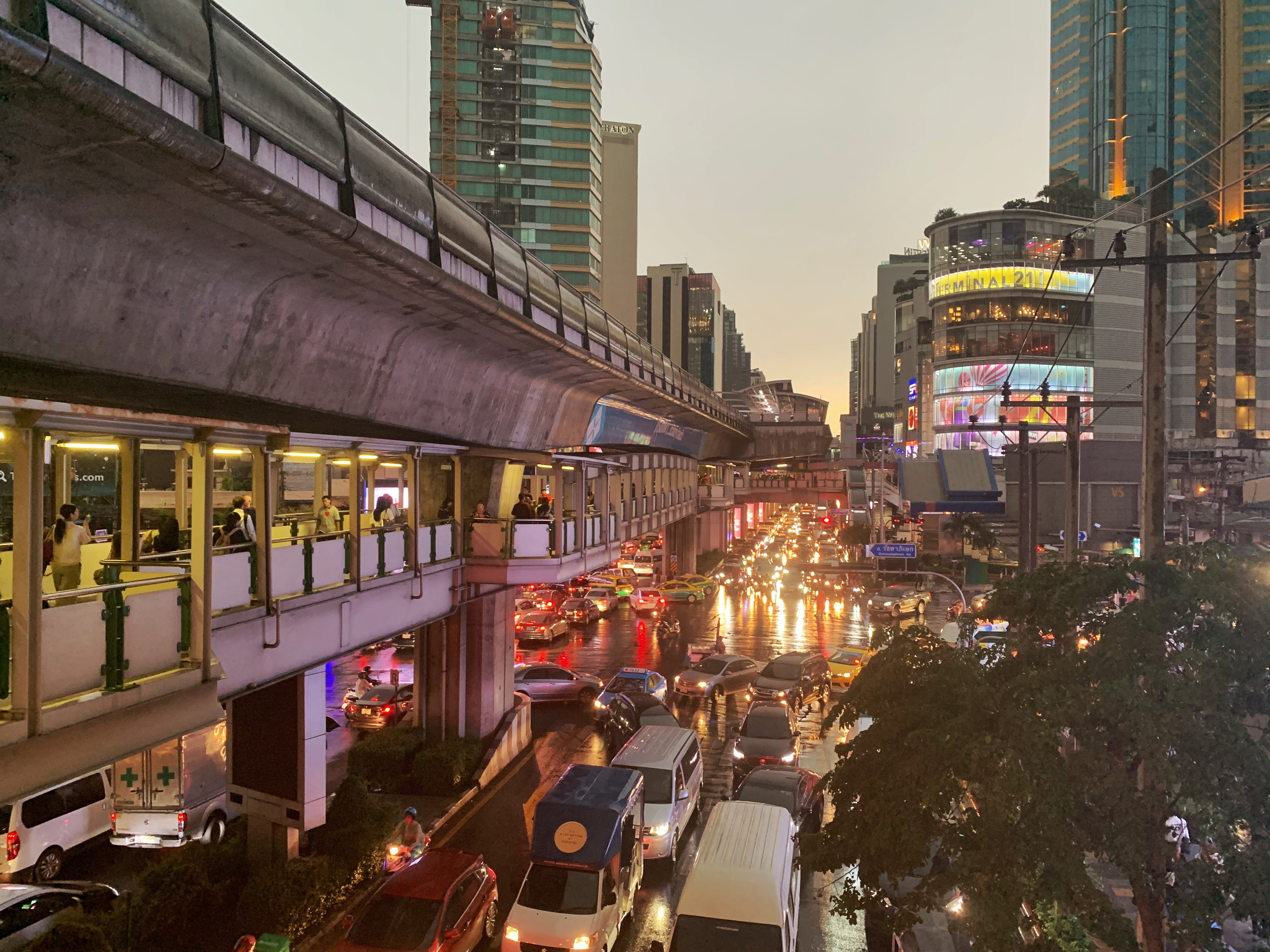
Sukhumvit Line at Asok Junction

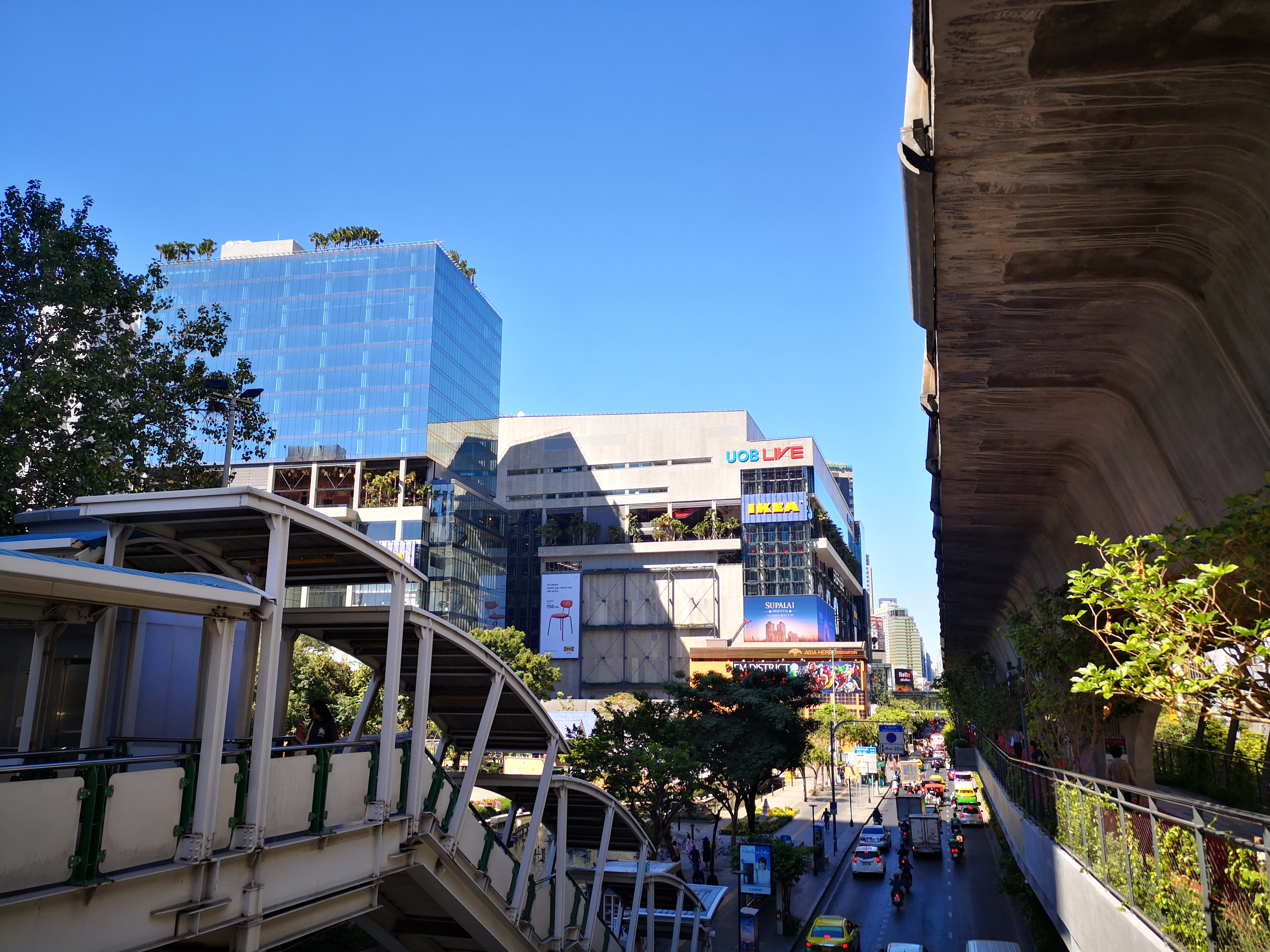
EmSphere from Phrom Phong station

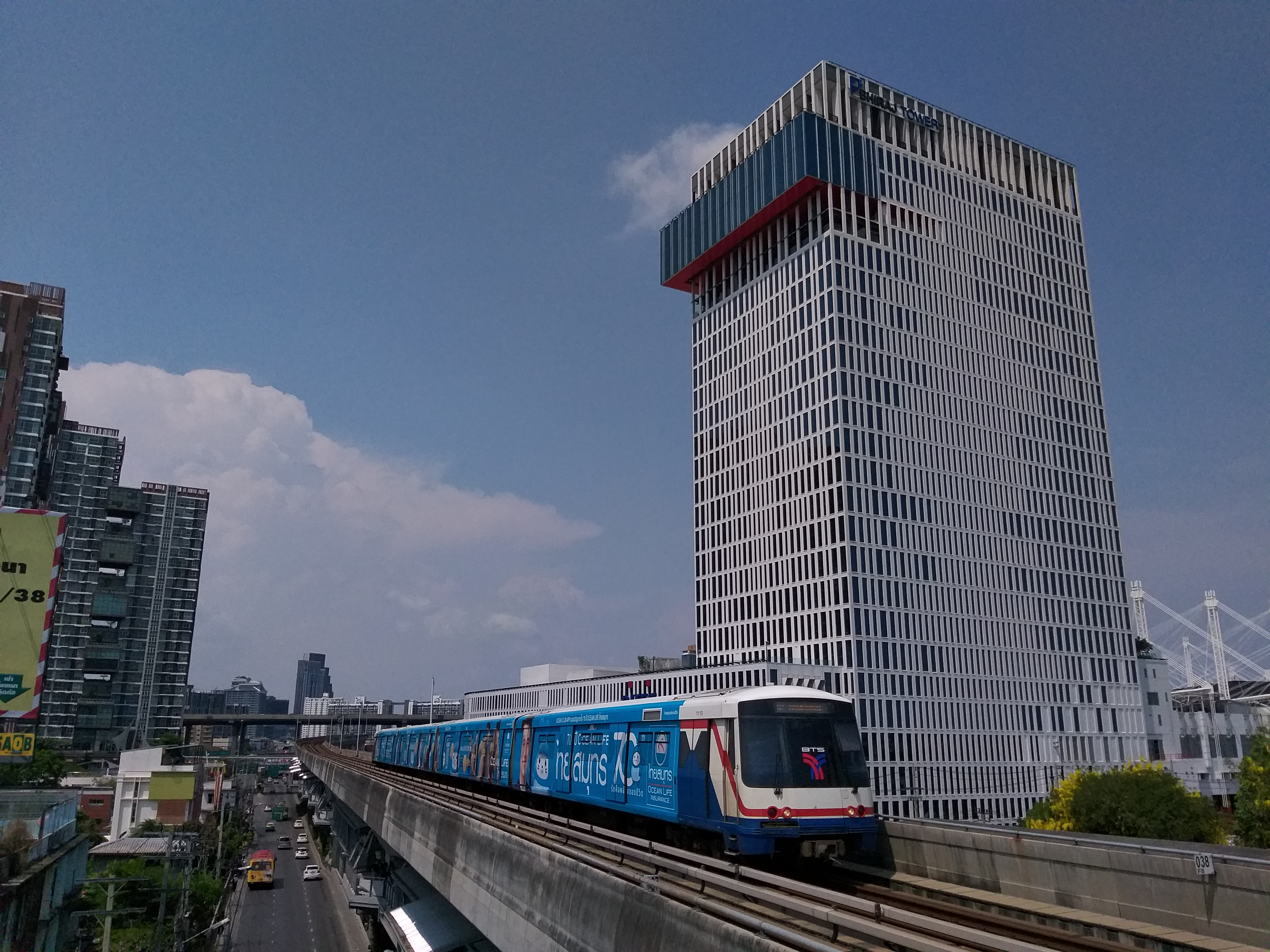
EMU-A1 at Bang Na station with BITEC behind

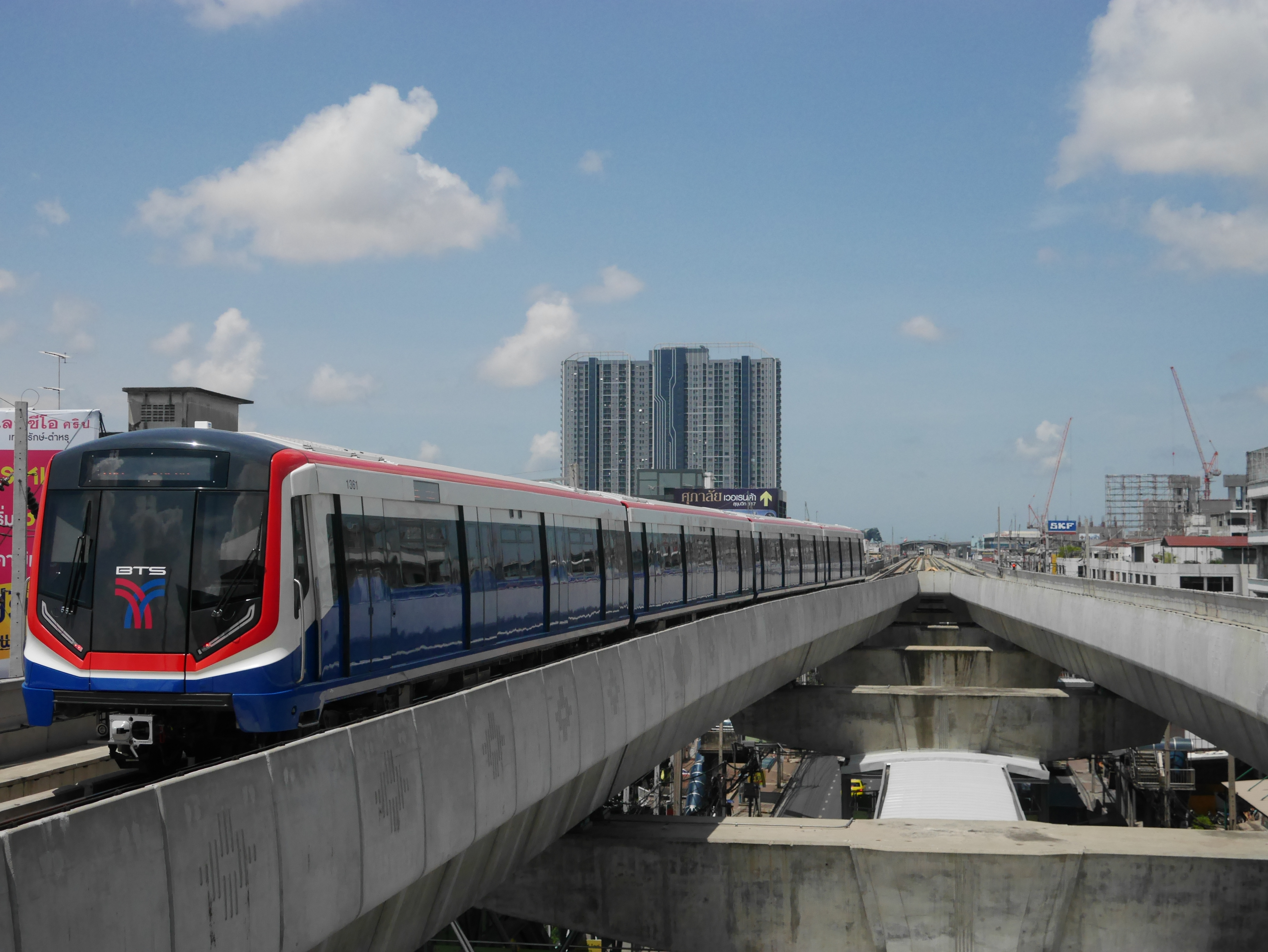
EMU-A2 departing Samrong station

== See also ==
- Mass Rapid Transit Master Plan in Bangkok Metropolitan Region
- BTS Skytrain
- Silom Line
- MRT (Bangkok)
- MRT Brown Line
- MRT Blue Line
- MRT Grey Line
- MRT Light Blue Line
- MRT Orange Line
- MRT Pink Line
- MRT Purple Line
- MRT Yellow Line
- AERA1 City
- SRT Dark Red Line
- SRT Light Red Line
- BMA Gold Line
- Bangkok BRT
