= Saphan Mai BTS station =

Rapid transit station in Bangkok

Saphan Mai สะพานใหม่
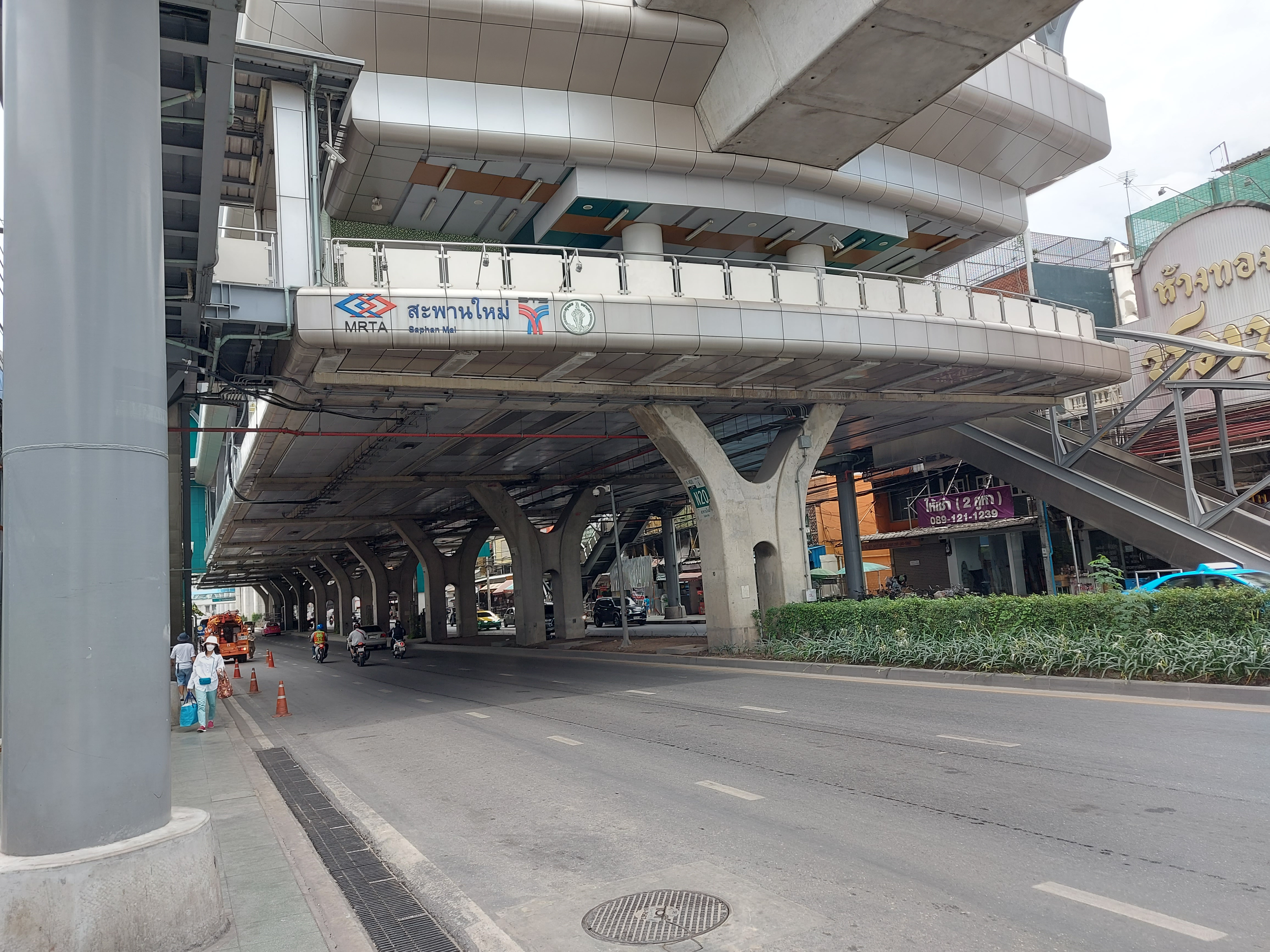

General information
- Location: Bang Khen and Sai Mai, Bangkok, Thailand
- Coordinates: 13.8966°N 100.6091°E
- System: BTS
- Owner: Bangkok Metropolitan Administration (BMA)
- Operator: Bangkok Mass Transit System; Public Company Limited (BTSC)
- Line: Sukhumvit Line

Other information
- Station code: N20

History
- Opened: 16 December 2020

Passengers
- 2021: 1,782,082

Services
Preceding station	BTS Skytrain	Following station
Bhumibol Adulyadej Hospital towards Khu Khot	Sukhumvit Line	Sai Yud towards Kheha
Location

Saphan Mai Station (Thai: สถานีสะพานใหม่, pronounced [sā.tʰǎː.nīː sā.pʰāːn màj]) is a BTS Skytrain station, on the Sukhumvit Line in Bangkok, Thailand. The station is part of the northern extension of the Sukhumvit Line and opened on 16 December 2020, as part of phase 4.

== See also ==
- Bangkok Skytrain
