= Punnawithi BTS station =

Skytrain station in Phra Khanong, Bangkok, Thailand

Punnawithi ปุณณวิถี
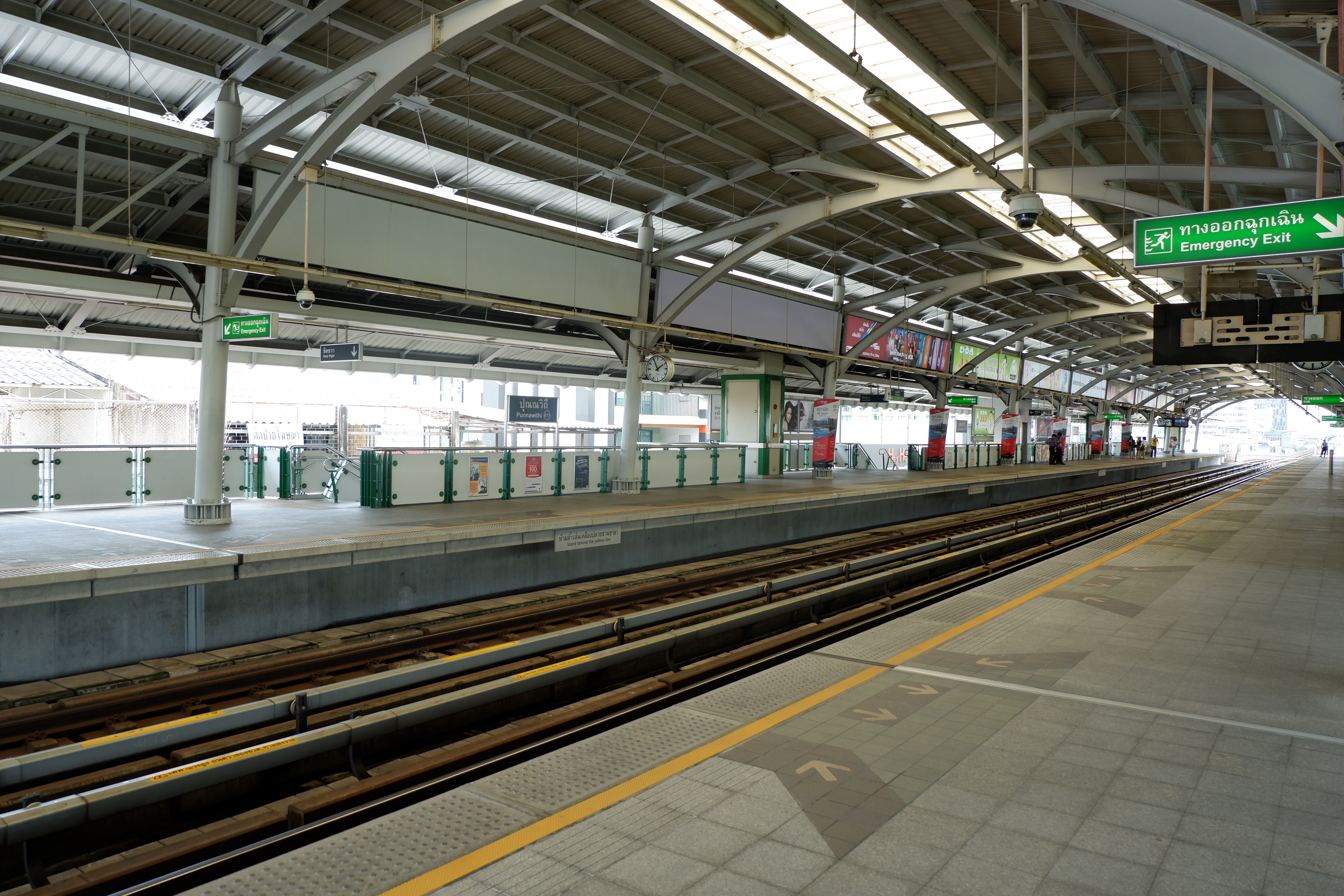

General information
- Location: Phra Khanong, Bangkok, Thailand
- Coordinates: 13°41′20.11″N 100°36′33.16″E
- System: BTS
- Owner: Bangkok Metropolitan Administration (BMA)
- Operator: Bangkok Mass Transit System; Public Company Limited (BTSC)
- Line: Sukhumvit Line

Other information
- Station code: E11

History
- Opened: 12 August 2011
- Former names: Thammamongkhon

Passengers
- 2021: 1,548,031

Services
Preceding station	BTS Skytrain	Following station
Bang Chak towards Khu Khot	Sukhumvit Line	Udom Suk towards Kheha
Location

Punnawithi Station Traditional sign

Punnawithi station (Thai: สถานีปุณณวิถี) is a BTS skytrain station, on the Sukhumvit Line in Phra Khanong District, Bangkok, Thailand. The station is located on Sukhumvit Road at Soi Punnawithi (Sukhumvit Soi 101).

Apart from the dense residential area surrounding the station, an attraction nearby the station is Dhammamongkol Temple on Soi Punnawithi with very tall and well decorated stupas which also house jade Buddha and Kuan Yin statues. Chanapatana International Design Institute which is founded by the temple is also situated on the same area.

Opened in 2011, it is a part of the 5.52 km (3.43 mi) skytrain extension from On Nut to Bearing station.

== See also ==
- Bangkok Skytrain
