= Debaratna Road =

Road in Thailand

Coordinates: 13.420511°N 100.996458°E

National Highway 34
- ทางหลวงแผ่นดินหมายเลข 34
- ถนนเทพรัตน; Thanon Theppharat; Debaratna Road

Route information
- Part of AH19 AH123
- Length: 58.855 km (36.571 mi)
- Existed: 1973–present

Major junctions
- West end: AH123 Sukhumvit Road / Chaloem Maha Nakhon Expressway Bang Na intersection, Bang Na, Bangkok
- AH2 Kanchanaphisek Road, Wat Salut Interchange, Bang Phli District, Samut Prakan; AH19 Motorway 7, Bang Pakong District, Chachoengsao
- East end: AH123 / Highway 361 Nong Mai Daeng interchange, Khlong Tamru, Mueang Chonburi, Chonburi

Location
- Country: Thailand
- Provinces: Bangkok, Samut Prakan, Chachoengsao, Chonburi
- Major cities: Chonburi

Highway system
- Highways in Thailand; Motorways; Asian Highways

Debaratna Road (Thai: ถนนเทพรัตน, RTGS: Thanon Theppharat), officially known as Highway 34 Bang Na–Nong Mai Daeng Route (ทางหลวงแผ่นดินหมายเลข 34 สายบางนา–หนองไม้แดง), and still known colloquially —and officially in Bangkok— as Bang Na–Trat Road (ถนนบางนา–ตราด), is a highway in Thailand from Bangkok that heads to the east like Sukhumvit Road (Highway 3) and Motorway 7 (Bangkok−Ban Chang Motorway).

== History ==
Originally, there was no official name for Highway 34. Therefore, people referred to the road by its perceived beginning and end, which included the part of Sukhumvit Road that continues on to Trat, giving the name Bang Na–Trat Road, by which it is still popularly known. The Department of Highways later designated the official name according to the true end of the route as Bang Na–Bang Pakong Highway (ทางหลวงสายบางนา–บางปะกง). However, the Bangkok Metropolitan Administration (BMA) has defined its distance in Bangkok as "Bang Na–Trat Road", following the colloquial name.

Bang Pakong Bridge, also formerly known as Devahastin Bridge is a bridge crossing the Bang Pakong River in Bang Pakong district that opened before the road in 1951.

In 1986, there was toll fee, with a toll station at the 41st kilometer (area of Bang Wua, Chachoengsao province), similar to Highway 32 (Asian Highway Route), but it was canceled according to a cabinet resolution in 1994.

On June 29, 2016, Princess Sirindhorn officially gave it the name "Debaratna Road".

== Route ==
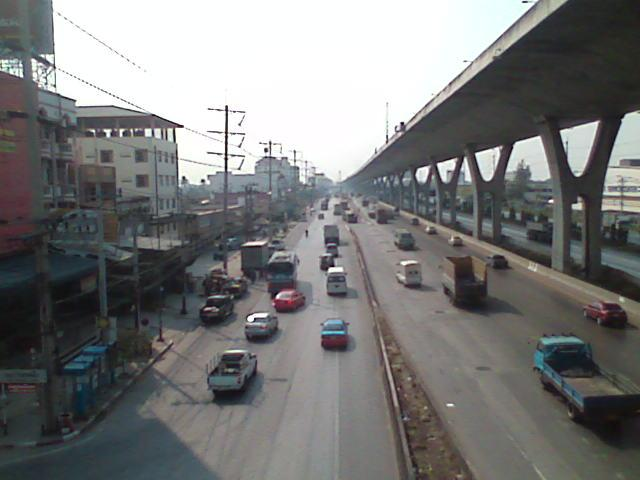
Debaratna Road and Burapha Withi Expressway, Bang Bo, Samut Prakan

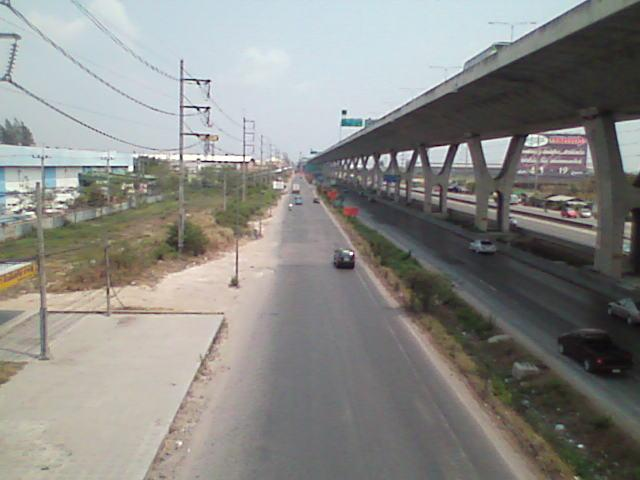
It is also better known by another name "Bang Na–Bang Pakong Road"

Debaratna Road near Wat Salut Interchange in 2023

Debaratna Road begins in Bangkok, as a continuation of Sanphawut Road (Highway 3102 Bang Na–Sanphawut Route) at Bang Na intersection where it cuts across Sukhumvit Road. Then it goes straight to the east, forming the administrative boundary line between Bang Na Nuea and Bang Na Tai subdistricts of Bang Na district up until the bridge over Khlong Bang Na, where it enters Samut Prakan province through the districts of Bang Phli, Bang Sao Thong and Bang Bo. Then it passes through the area of Bang Pakong district, Chachoengsao province, then overlaps with Sukhumvit Road from the Khlong Om intersection up until the end at Nong Mai Daeng interchange in Mueang Chonburi, Chonburi province, with a total distance of 58.855 km (36.6 mi). Sukhumvit Road and Highway 361 (Chonburi Bypass Road) are continuing routes.

Burapha Withi Expressway runs parallel to it almost all the way.

Bordering the road are the Nation Multimedia Group (NMG), Wat Sri Iam, Bangkok Mall, Central Bangna, Mega Bangna, Bangkok International Trade and Exhibition Centre (BITEC), Thainakarin Hospital, Bangna General Hospital 1, Nation University, Huachiew Chalermprakiet University (HCU), Ramkhamhaeng University (Bang Na Campus) etc.
