= Samrong Nuea =

Samrong Nuea สำโรงเหนือ
- Tambon
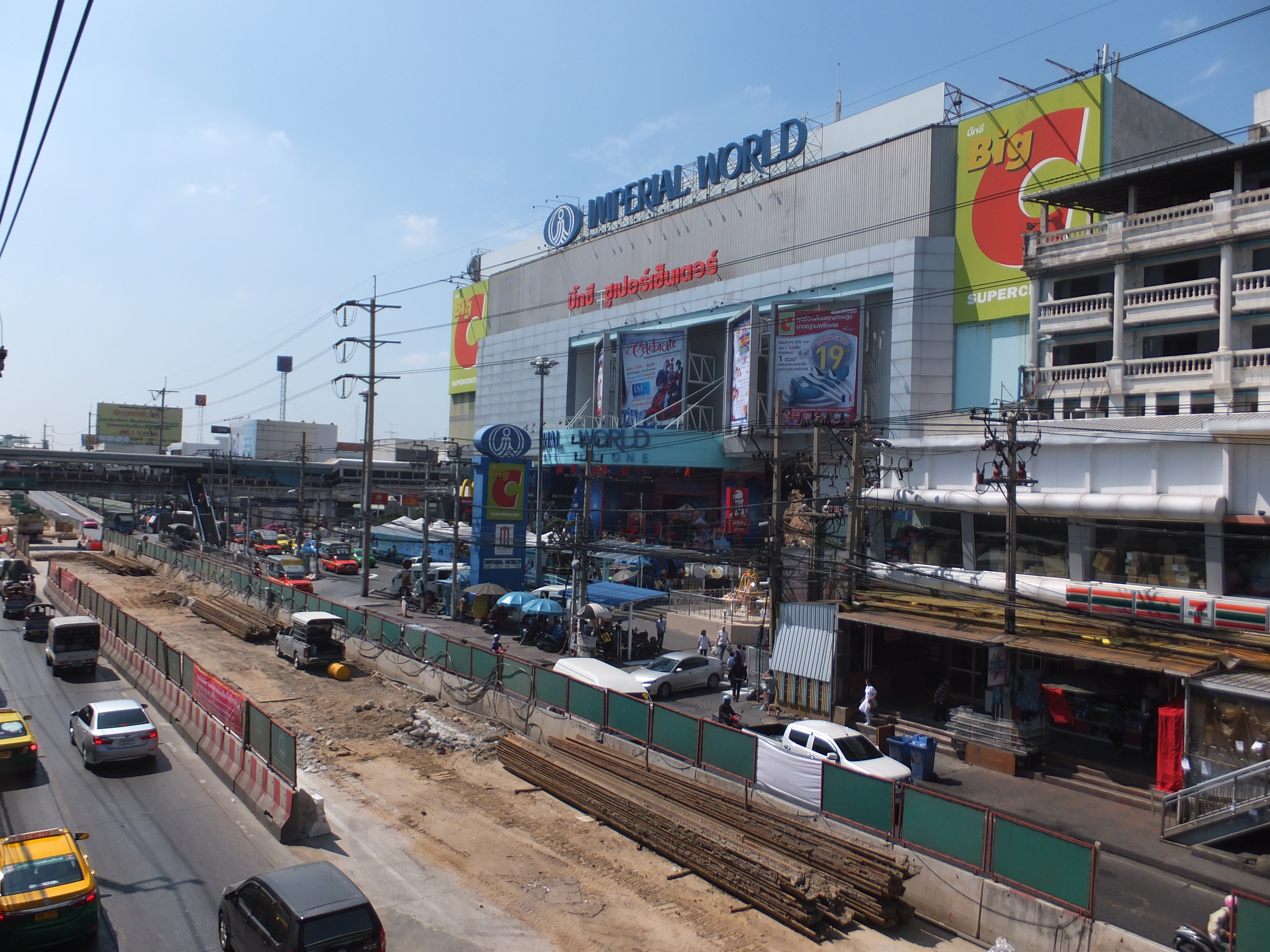
- Sukhumvit Road and Imperial World Samrong with under construction Samrong BTS Station (early 2015)
- Etymology: Northern Samrong
- Nickname: Samrong
- Location in Bangkok Metropolitan Region
- Coordinates: 13°39′29.3″N 100°36′02.3″E
- Country: Thailand
- Province: Samut Prakan
- District: Mueang Samut Prakan

Population
  - Total: 55,389
- Time zone: UTC+7 (ICT)
- Postcode: 10270
- Area code: (+66) 02

Samrong Nuea (Thai: สำโรงเหนือ, pronounced [sǎm.rōːŋ nɯ̌a]), also popularly called for short Samrong (pronounced [sǎm.rōːŋ]) is a tambon (sub-district) and neighbourhood of Mueang Samut Prakan District, Samut Prakan Province on eastern outskirts Bangkok.

== Description ==
Its name meaning "northern Samrong" after Khlong Samrong, a main watercourse flowing through the area.

The area is the northernmost part of the district. It borders Bang Na Tai in Bang Na District of Bangkok to the north.

== Administration & population ==
Samrong Nuea is part of the administrative area of Samrong Nuea Subdistrict Municipality.

The area also consists of nine administrative muban (village).

| No. | Name | Thai |
|---|---|---|
| 1. | Ban Likit | บ้านลิขิต |
| 2. | Ban Thahan Ruea | บ้านทหารเรือ |
| 3. | Ban Hua Pa | บ้านหัวป่า |
| 4. | Ban Yai | บ้านใหญ่ |
| 5. | Ban Khlong Krathum | บ้านคลองกระทุ่ม |
| 6. | Ban Bearing | บ้านแบริ่ง |
| 7. | Ban Maha Phap | บ้านมหาภาพ |
| 8. | Ban Bearing | บ้านแบริ่ง |
| 9. | Ban Talat Samrong | บ้านตลาดสำโรง |

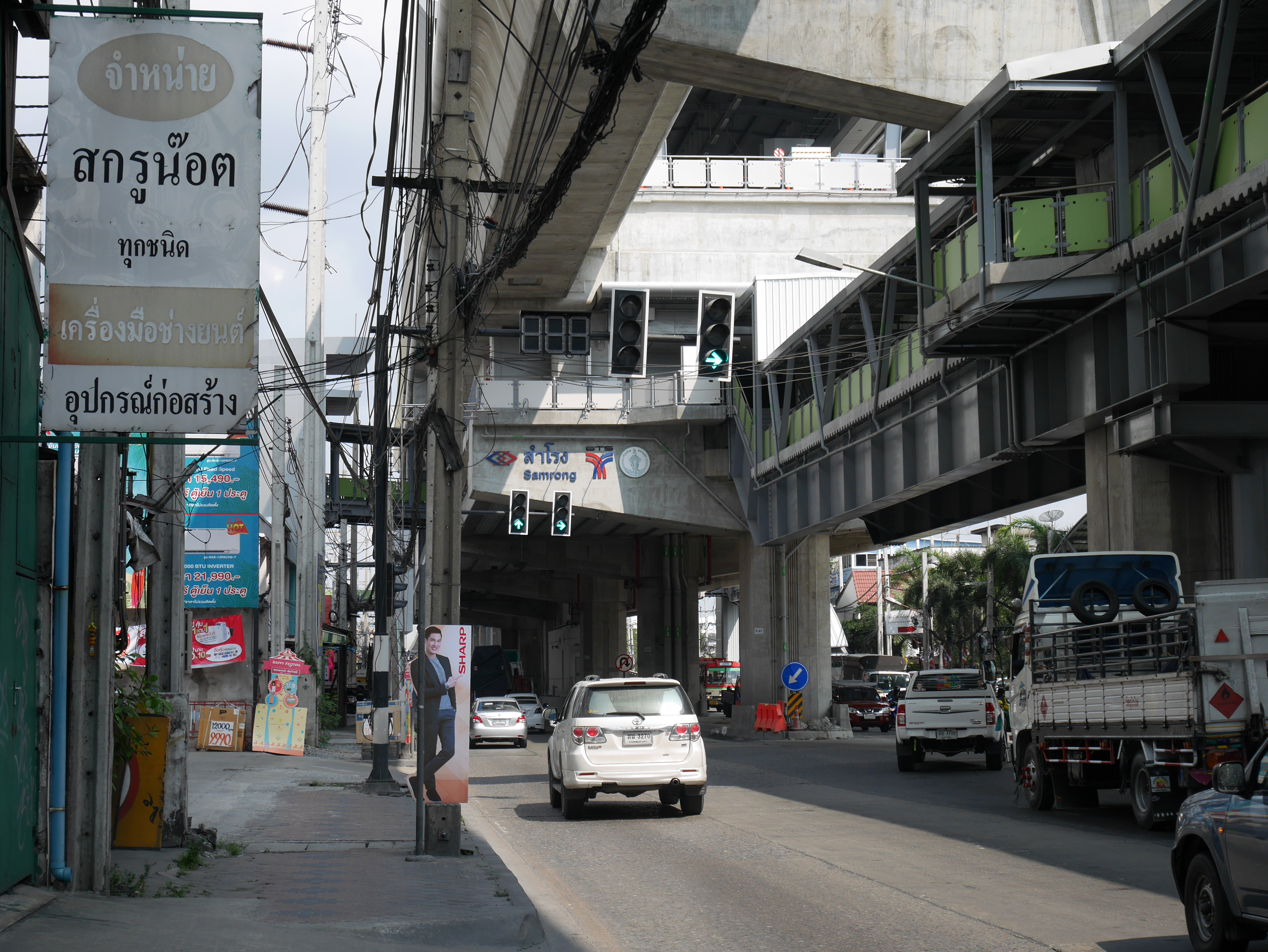
Samrong BTS Station and passing Sukhumvit Road

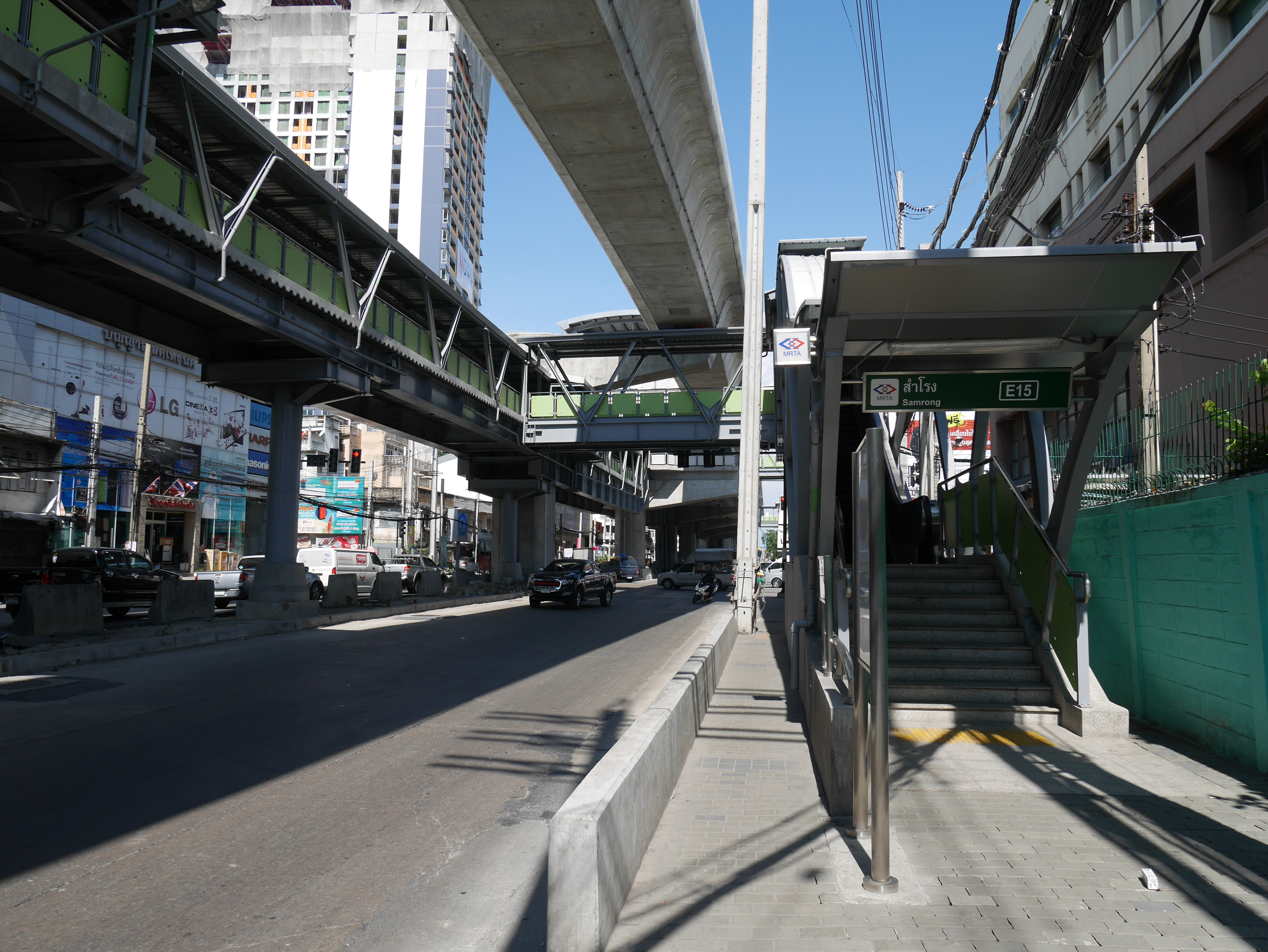
Entry of Samrong BTS Station

It has a total population of 55,389 people in 18,989 households.

== Places ==
- Imperial World Samrong
- Samrong General Hospital
- Wat Dan Samrong
- Mathayomwat Dansamrong School
- Makro Srinagarindra

== Transportation ==
The area served by nearby the Bearing (E14) and Samrong Stations (E15) of the BTS skytrain, whose Sukhumvit Line runs above Sukhumvit Road (Highway 3).

Samrong Nuea is also a transit and departure point for many BMTA bus routes such as 2 (Samrong – Pak Khlong Talat), 23 (Samrong – Thewet), 25 (Pak Nam – Sanam Luang), as well as a large number of songthaew (local bus).

Sukhumvit, Srinagarindra (Highway 3344), Bearing (Soi Sukhumvit 107), Thang Rotfai Sai Kao Paknam Roads are the main road.

== See also ==
- Pu Chao Saming Phrai – adjacent area is collectively referred to as "Samrong" as well.
