= V Srivarathanabul =

Thai rapper

V Srivarathanabul (Thai: วีร์ ศรีวราธนบูลย์) is a Thai rapper and political candidate. Srivarathanabul is the Democrat Party's candidate for Bangkok's Constituency 23 in the 2026 Thai general election.

== Early life and education ==
Srivarathanabul graduated from the faculty of arts at Chulalongkorn University.

== Career ==
As a rapper and hip hop artist, Srivarathanabul goes by the moniker and social media handle "Badbitchbkk".

Srivarathanabul is a candidate for the Democrat Party in Bangkok's Constituency 23, which includes Phra Khanong and Bang Na districts. Srivarathanabul has campaigned on all-gender toilets, training government offices in gender sensitivity, and creating queer-friendly community places across Thailand.
