= Bang Chak =

Bang Chak or Bangchak may refer to:

The Thai name บางจาก:

- Bangchak Corporation, a Thai energy company
- Bang Chak, Phra Khanong, a subdistrict of Phra Khanong District in Bangkok's east side and the company's namesake
  - Bang Chak BTS station, which serves the area
- Bang Chak, Phasi Charoen, a subdistrict of Phasi Charoen District in Bangkok's west side
- Bang Chak Subdistrict in Mueang Nakhon Si Thammarat District
- Bang Chak Subdistrict in Mueang Phetchaburi District
  - Bang Chak railway station, which serves the area
- Bang Chak Subdistrict in Phra Pradaeng District, Samut Prakan

The Thai name บางจัก:

- Bang Chak Subdistrict in Wiset Chai Chan District, Ang Thong
