= Udom Suk BTS station =

Udom Suk อุดมสุข
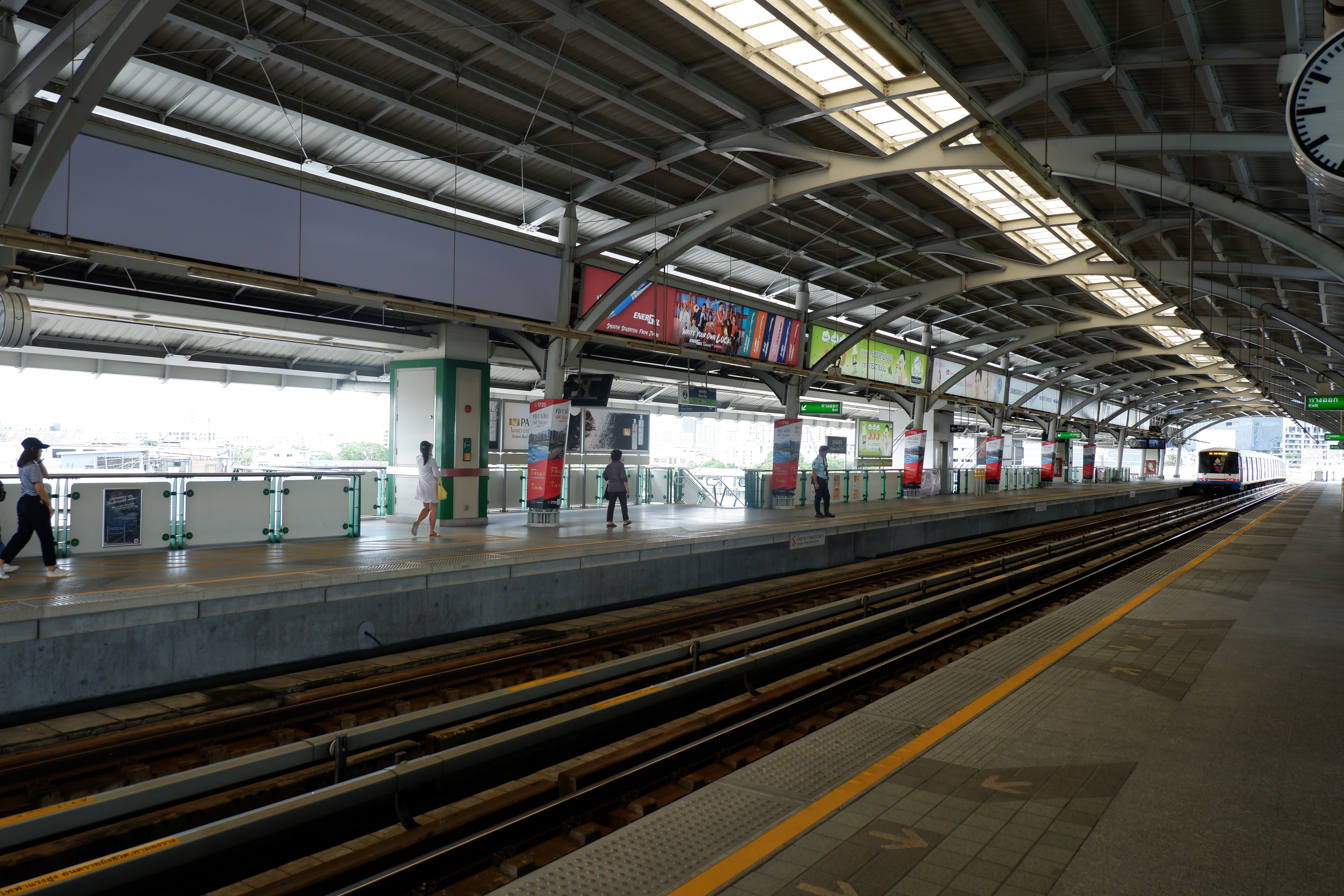

General information
- Location: Bang Na, Bangkok, Thailand
- Coordinates: 13°40′49.14″N 100°36′34.77″E
- System: BTS
- Owner: Bangkok Metropolitan Administration (BMA)
- Operator: Bangkok Mass Transit System; Public Company Limited (BTSC)
- Line: Sukhumvit Line

Other information
- Station code: E12

History
- Opened: 12 August 2011

Passengers
- 2021: 2,976,679

Services
| Preceding station | BTS Skytrain | Following station |
|---|---|---|
| Punnawithi towards Khu Khot | Sukhumvit Line | Bang Na towards Kheha |
Location

Udom Suk Station Traditional sign

Udom Suk station (Thai: สถานีอุดมสุข) is a BTS skytrain station, on the Sukhumvit Line in Bang Na District, Bangkok, Thailand. The station is located on Sukhumvit Road at Soi Udom Suk (Sukhumvit Soi 103), to the north of Bang Na intersection. It is a part of the 5.52 km skytrain extension from On Nut to Bearing station opened in 2011.

Udom Suk station connects to buses, vans or taxis along Bang Na Expressway to places such as CentralPlaza Bangna shopping center, Bang Na Campus of Ramkhamhaeng University, communities and industrial estates in Bang Phli District, and Suvarnabhumi Campus of Assumption University.

== See also ==
- Bangkok Skytrain
