= Bang Chak BTS station =

Train station

Bang Chak บางจาก
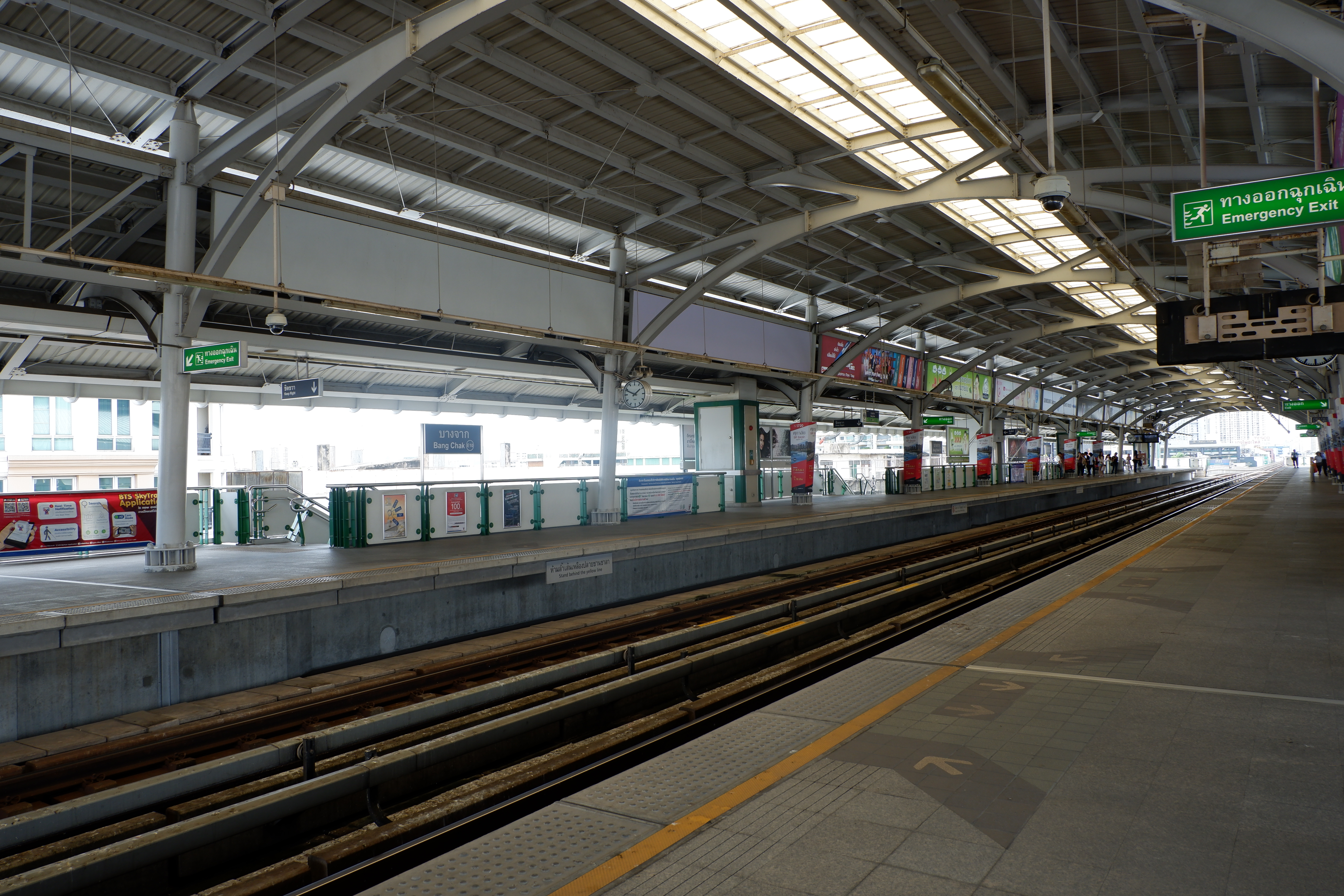

General information
- Location: Phra Khanong, Bangkok, Thailand
- Coordinates: 13.6969°N 100.6053°E
- System: BTS
- Owner: Bangkok Metropolitan Administration (BMA)
- Operator: Bangkok Mass Transit System; Public Company Limited (BTSC)
- Line: Sukhumvit Line

Other information
- Station code: E10

History
- Opened: 12 August 2011

Passengers
- 2021: 1,371,287

Services
Preceding station	BTS Skytrain	Following station
On Nut towards Khu Khot	Sukhumvit Line	Punnawithi towards Kheha
Location

Bang Chak Station Traditional sign

Bang Chak station (Thai: สถานีบางจาก, pronounced [sā.tʰǎː.nīː bāːŋ t͡ɕàːk]) is a BTS Skytrain station, on the Sukhumvit line in Phra Khanong District, Bangkok, Thailand.

Opened in 2011, it is a part of the Skytrain extension from On Nut to Bearing station.

== See also ==
- Bangkok Skytrain
