= Bang Na BTS station =

Bang Na บางนา
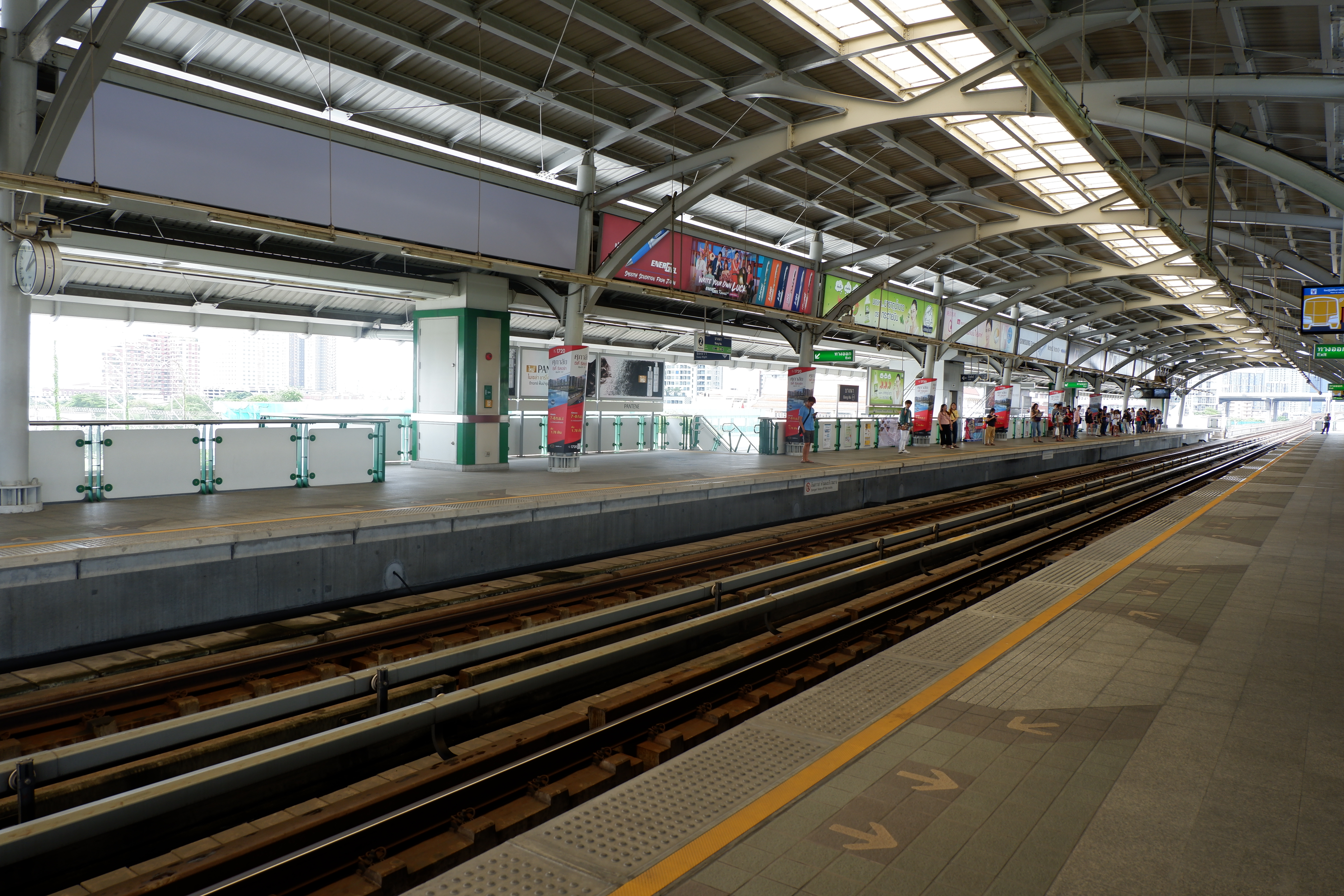

General information
- Location: Bang Na, Bangkok, Thailand
- Coordinates: 13.6682°N 100.6047°E
- System: BTS
- Owner: Bangkok Metropolitan Administration (BMA)
- Operator: Bangkok Mass Transit System; Public Company Limited (BTSC)
- Line: Sukhumvit Line

Other information
- Station code: E13

History
- Opened: 12 August 2011

Passengers
- 2021: 963,280

Services
Preceding station	BTS Skytrain	Following station
Udom Suk towards Khu Khot	Sukhumvit Line	Bearing towards Kheha
Location

Bang Na Station Traditional sign

Bang Na station (Thai: สถานีบางนา, pronounced [sā.tʰǎː.nīː bāːŋ nāː]) is a BTS Skytrain station, on the Sukhumvit Line in Bang Na District, Bangkok, Thailand.

Opened in 2011, it is a part of the Skytrain extension from On Nut to Bearing station. It has a skywalk to the Bangkok International Trade and Exhibition Centre (BITEC).

== See also ==
- Bangkok Skytrain
