= Motorway 7 =

Motorway 7 can refer to:

- M7 motorway (Ireland), a motorway in Ireland
- M7 motorway (Hungary), a motorway in Hungary
- M7 highway (Russia), a highway in Russia, also known as the Volga Highway
- Westlink M7, a motorway in Australia
- Motorway Route 7 (Thailand), a motorway in Thailand
- Otoyol 7, a motorway in Turkey
