= AH19 =

Asian Highway route in Thailand

Asian Highway 19

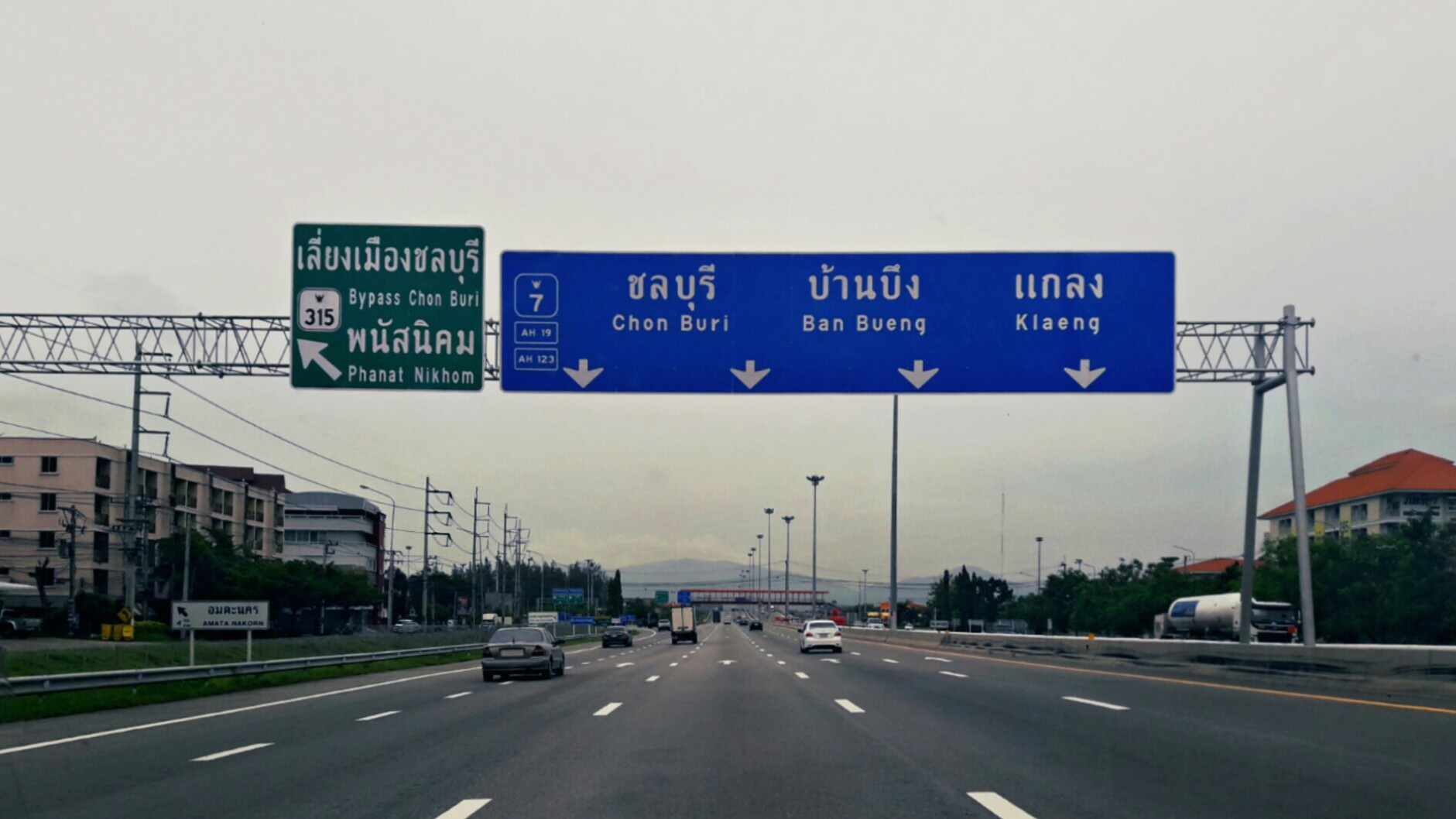
- AH 19 (Thailand Motorway 7) section

Route information
- Length: 459 km (285 mi)

Major junctions
- North end: Nakhon Ratchasima
- South end: Bangkok

Location
- Country: Thailand

Highway system
- Highways in Thailand; Motorways; Asian Highways
← AH18	→ AH21

Asian Highway 19 (AH19) is a road in the Asian Highway Network running 459 km from Nakhon Ratchasima to Bangkok in Thailand. This highway connects Nakhon Ratchasima to Bangkok via port city of Laem Chabang.

== Thailand ==
The route connects these cities Nakhon Ratchasima - Kabinburi - Chonburi - Bangkok of Thailand.

- Route 304 : Pru Yai (Nakhon Ratchasima) - Phanom Sarakham
- Route 331 : Khao Hin Son - Nern Pha Suk
- Route 7 : Laem Chabang Port - Srinagarindra Rd. (Bangkok)
- Route 361 : Whole Route
- Route 3 (Sukhumvit Road) : Nong Mai Daeng Interchange - Samut Prakan
- Route 34 (Debaratna Road) : Whole Route

== Junctions ==
AH12 Nakhon Ratchasima
AH1 Kabinburi
AH2 Bangkok

== See also ==
- List of Asian Highways
