= Motorway 7 (Thailand) =

Highway in Thailand

Motorway Route 7
- ทางหลวงพิเศษหมายเลข 7
- Bangkok−Ban Chang Motorway ทางหลวงพิเศษกรุงเทพมหานคร−บ้านฉาง
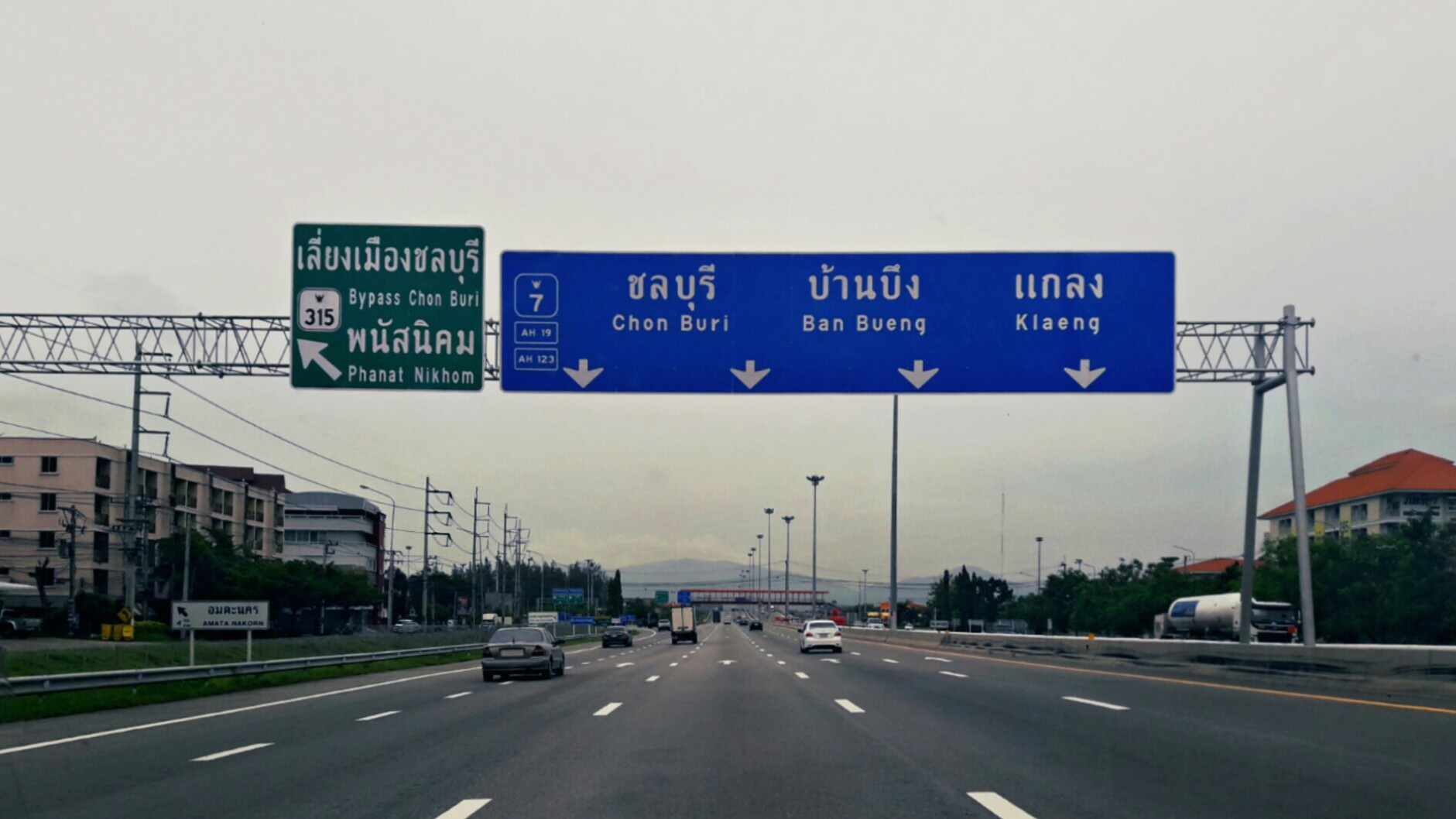

Route information
- Part of AH19 AH123
- Maintained by Department of Highways
- Length: 149.3 km (92.8 mi)

Major junctions
- West end: Si Rat Expressway / Rama IX Road
- Srinagarindra Road; Kanchanaphisek Road; Bang Na Expressway; Siri Sothon Road; Sukhaprayoon Road; Chonburi–Klaeng Road; Pattaya–Rayong; Yutthasat Road
- South end: Sukhumvit Road

Location
- Country: Thailand
- Provinces: Bangkok, Samut Prakan, Chachoengsao, Chonburi, Rayong
- Major cities: Bangkok, Pattaya

Highway system
- Highways in Thailand; Motorways; Asian Highways

The Bangkok−Ban Chang Motorway (Thai: ทางหลวงพิเศษกรุงเทพมหานคร−บ้านฉาง, RTGS: Thangluang Phiset Krung Thep Maha Nakhon−Ban Chang), designated Motorway Route 7, is a motorway in Thailand, connecting Bangkok to Chonburi, Pattaya, and Map Ta Phut. The country's first intercity motorway, it is part of the Asian Highway Network as AH Route 19 and AH Route 123. The entire length from Bangkok to Pattaya is 125.865 kilometres (78.209 mi) and the posted speed limit is 120 kilometres per hour (75 mph), enforced primarily by speed cameras. An extension between Pong and Map Ta Phut opened in May 2020. It is part of the transport network development project in the eastern seaboard.

== Routes ==
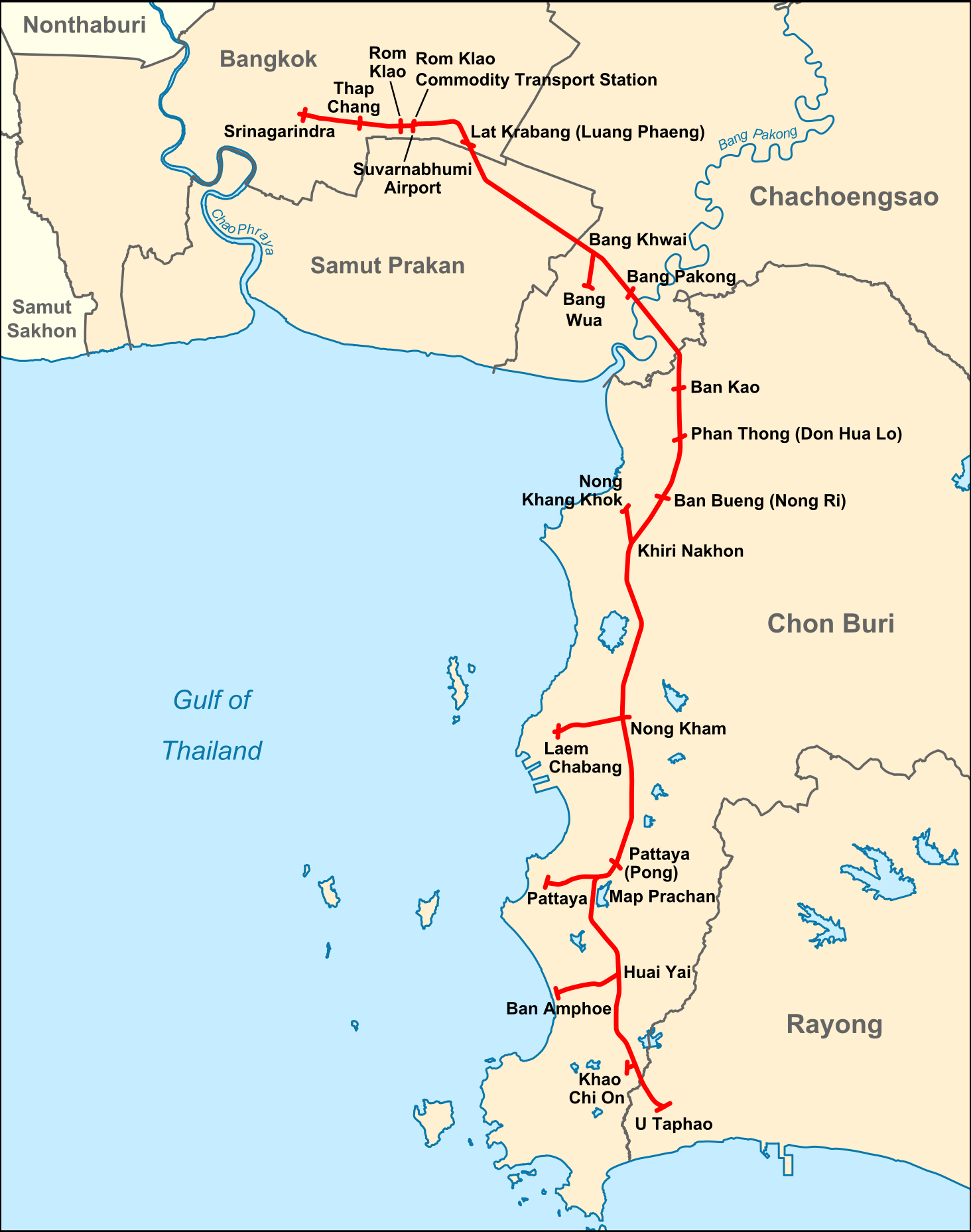
Courses of Motorway Route 7 with its spurs and interchanges in the central and eastern regions of Thailand.

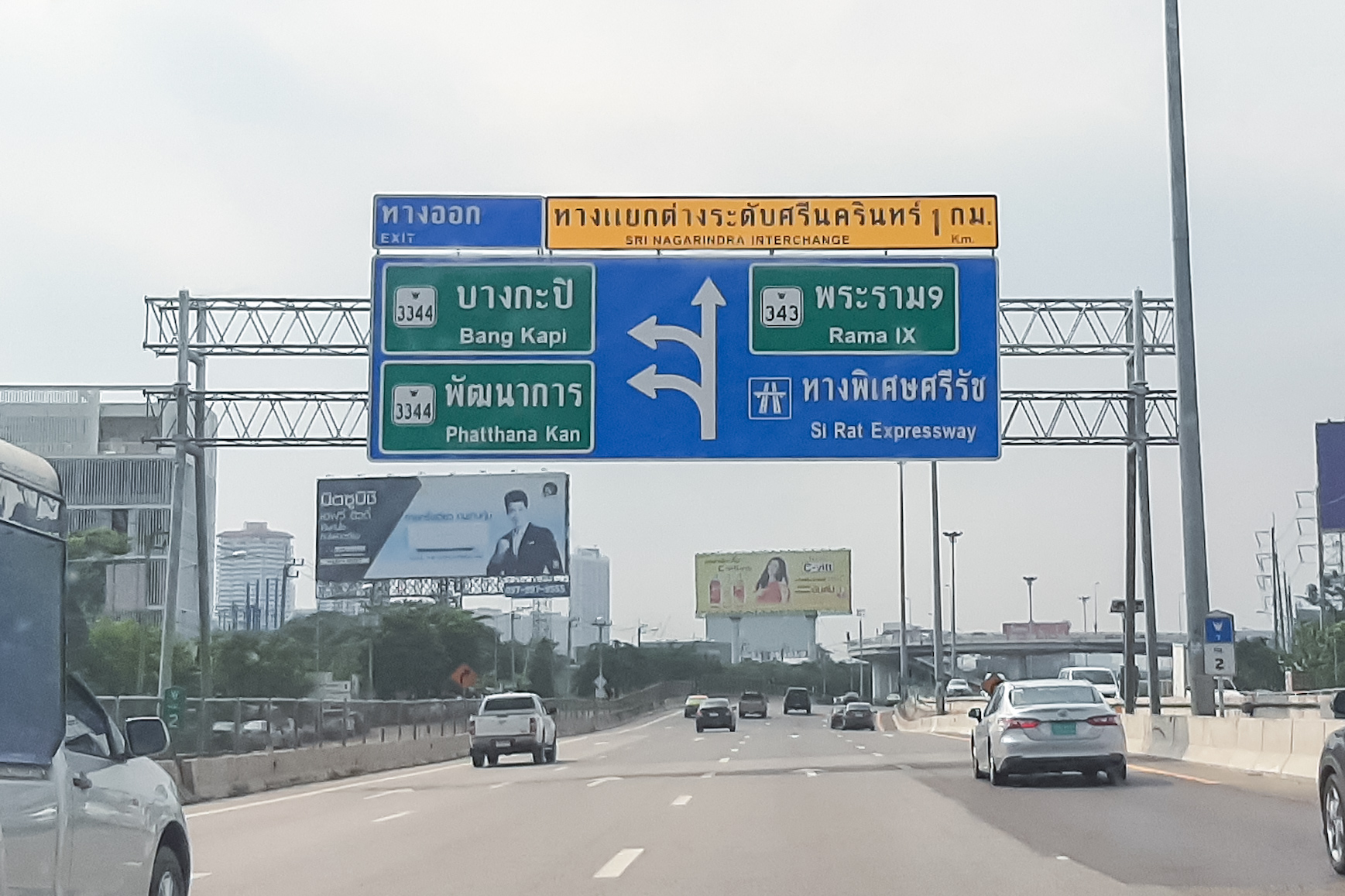
Srinagarindra Interchange head to Rama IX Road

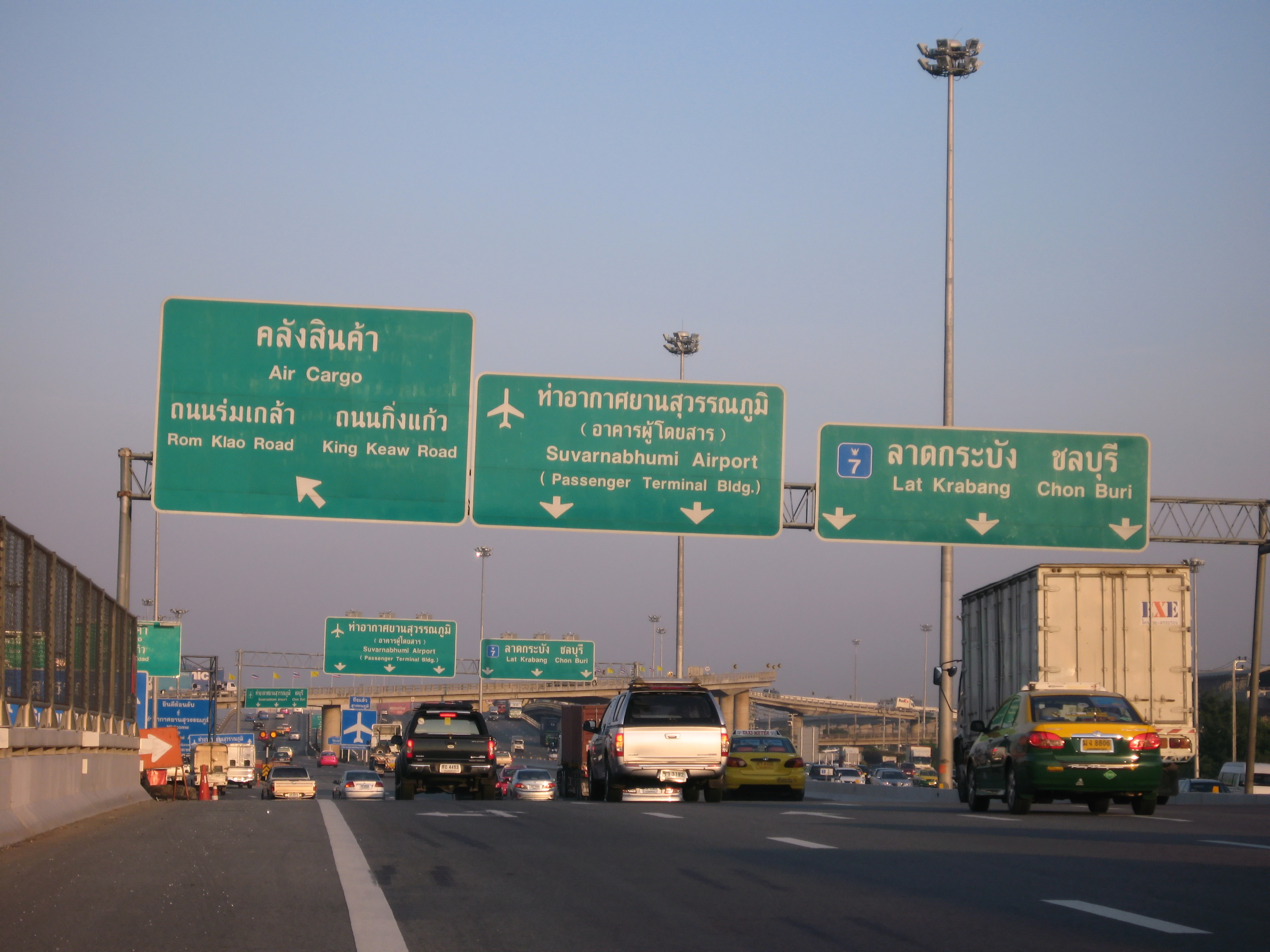
Motorway 7 at Suvarnabhumi Airport

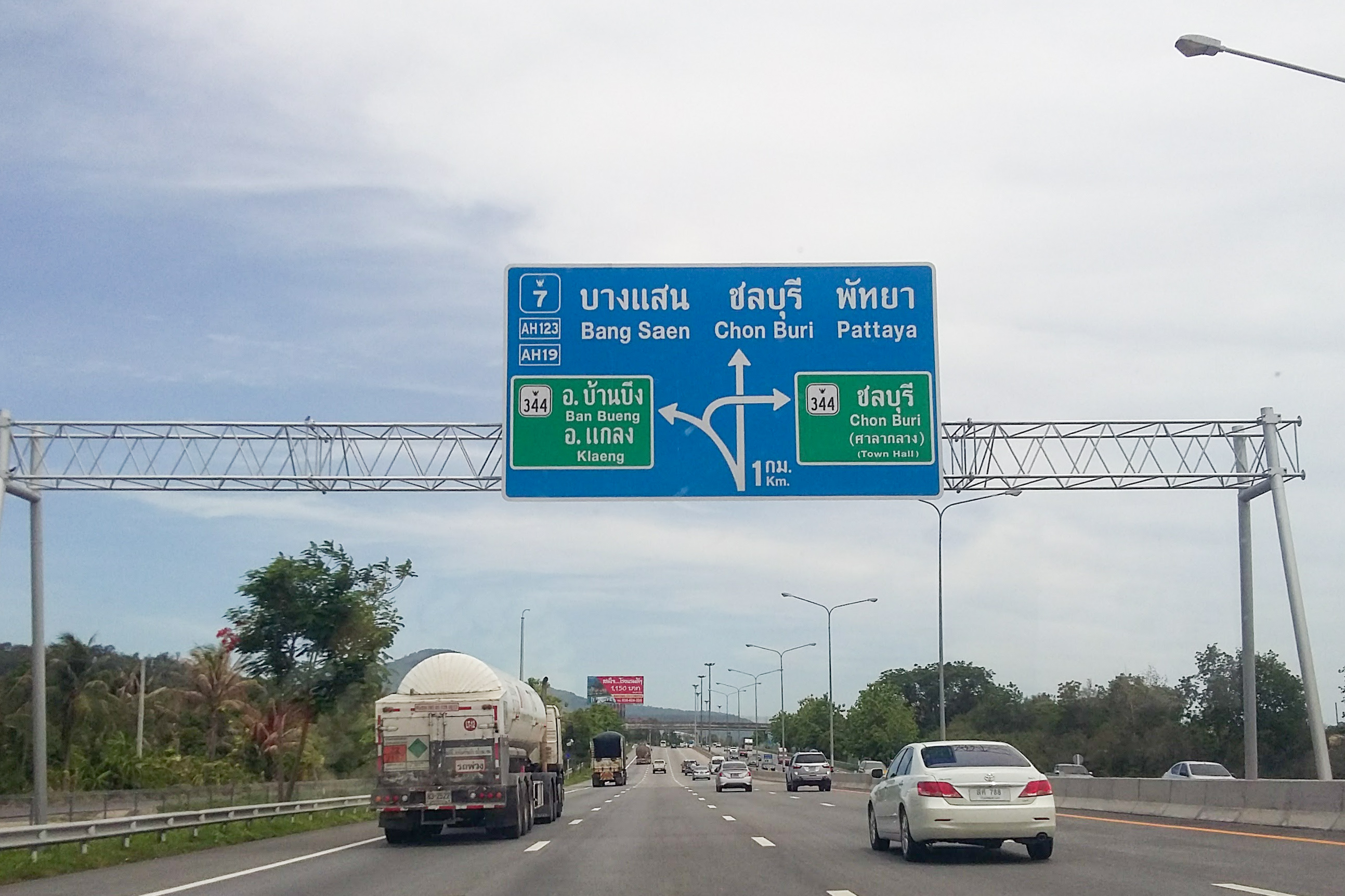
Motorway 7 to the southeast

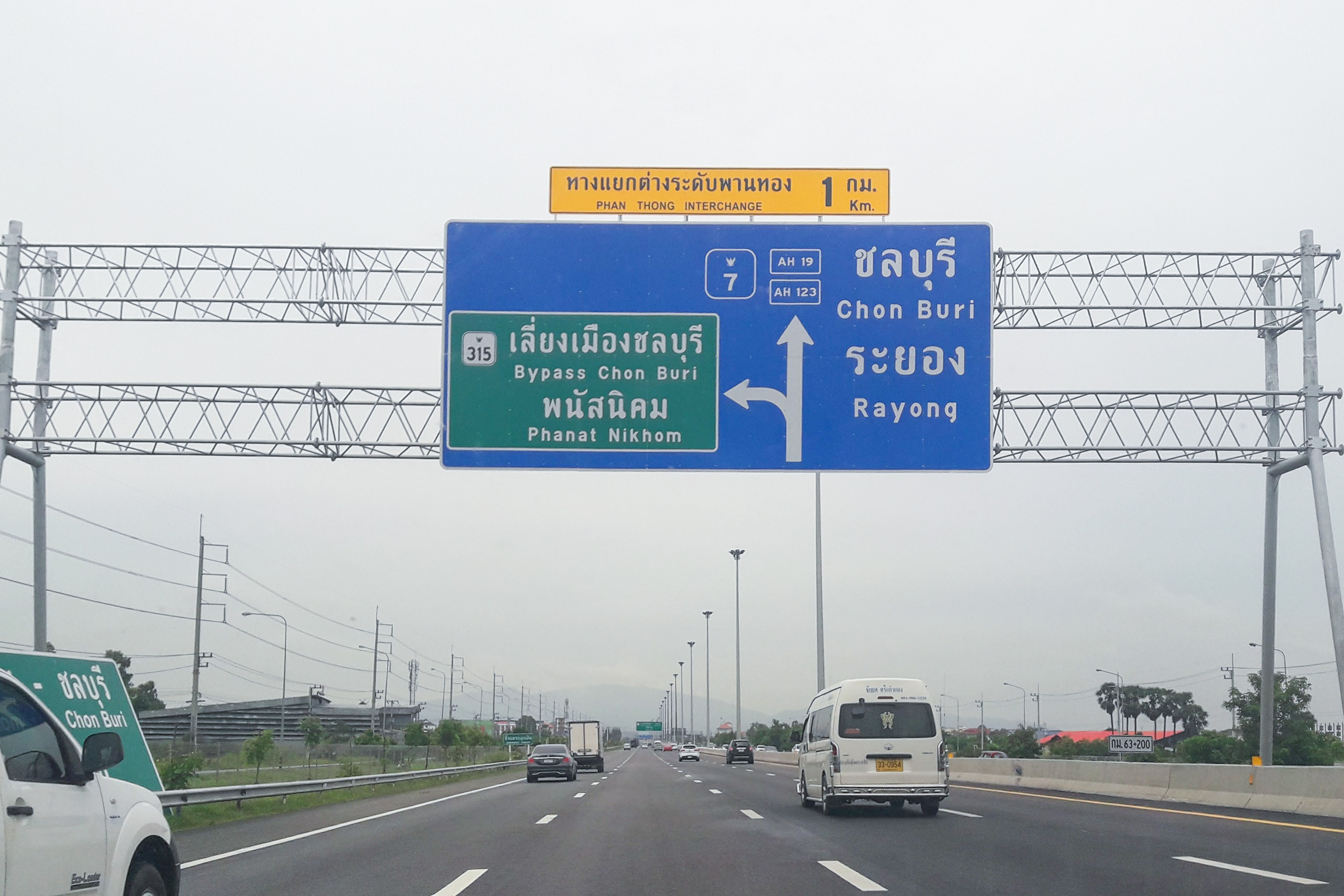
Motorway 7 at Bang Saen

=== Main route ===
Motorway Route 7, in the beginning, was called Bangkok–Chonburi Road or Bangkok–Chonburi Road New Line. It is an eight-lane intercity-motorway and originates in Si Rat Expressway Section D and Rama IX Road at the Sri Nagarindra Interchange in Suan Luang District, heading Eastern Thailand. It crosses Saphan Sung District, Prawet District, and intersects Kanchanaphisek Road (Motorway Route 9) at Thap Chang Interchange in Prawet District, and Rom Klao Road (National Route 3119) at Rom Klao Interchange in Lat Krabang District, and on through Samut Prakan Province, Chachoengsao Province and finally Chonburi Province at Khiri Nakhon Interchange in Mueang Chonburi District.

The second section, is called Chonburi–Pattaya Road. It goes through Si Racha District, connecting Laem Chabang at Nong Kham Interchange. This section originating from Bangkok to this area is part of Asian Highway 19 (AH19) and another section originating from this area to Pattaya is part of Asian Highway 123. In this section, it is an eight-lane intercity-motorway and intersects National Route 36 at Pattaya Interchange, and finally ends and joins Sukhumvit Road (National Route 3) in Map Ta Phut, Rayong.

=== Spur routes ===
The spur routes connect between main route and the economic area, also National Routes including Sukhumvit Road. This routes heading to coasts are planned as the semi-controlled access motorway. The spur routes branches from Motorway Route 7 are:

- Motorway−Bang Wua Spur Route, connecting between Motorway Route 7 to Debaratna Road.
- Motorway−Chonburi Spur Route, connecting between Motorway Route 7 to National Route 361.
- Motorway−Laem Chabang Spur Route, connecting between Motorway Route 7 to Laem Chabang Port.
- Motorway−Pattaya Spur Route, connecting between Motorway Route 7 to Sukhumvit Road.
- Motorway−Ban Amphoe Spur Route, connecting between Motorway Route 7 to Sukhumvit Road.

=== Frontage routes ===
The frontage routes are the local roads running parallel to motorway route 7. They are designated as National Route both left and right routes. The left route is Thailand Route 3701 and Thailand Route 3702.

== List of facilities ==
AH19 AH123 Bangkok−Ban Chang Motorway
Location		km	Northbound exits (read up)	Facility		Southbound exits (read down)	Lanes
Province	District	km	Northbound exits (read up)	English	Thai	Southbound exits (read down)	Lanes
Bangkok	Suan Luang	0.00	Phra Ram 9, Phaya Thai (Si Rat Expressway)	Sri Nagarindra Interchange	ทางแยกต่างระดับศรีนครินทร์	Mueang Samut Prakan ( Srinagarindra)	8
Bangkok	Suan Luang	0.00	Bang Kapi (Sri Nagarindra)	Sri Nagarindra Interchange	ทางแยกต่างระดับศรีนครินทร์	Mueang Samut Prakan ( Srinagarindra)	8
Bangkok	Prawet	6.60	Bang Pa-in ( AH2 Kanchanaphisek)	Thap Chang Interchange	ทางแยกต่างระดับทับช้าง	Bang Phli ( AH2 Kanchanaphisek)	8
Bangkok	Lat Krabang	11.35	Min Buri ( Rom Klao)	Rom Klao Interchange	ทางแยกต่างระดับร่มเกล้า	Lat Krabang ( Rom Klao)	8
Bangkok	Lat Krabang	20.80	Mueang Chachoengsao (Lat Krabang)	Lat Krabang Interchange	ทางแยกต่างระดับลาดกระบัง	Lat Krabang (Lat Krabang)	8
Bangkok	Lat Krabang		Lat Krabang Rest Stop	จุดพักรถลาดกระบัง			8
Samut Prakan	Bang Sao Thong	20.80	Lat Krabang Tollgate	ด่านเก็บเงินลาดกระบัง			8
Chachoengsao	Bang Pakong	40.85	No exit	Bang Khwai Interchange	ทางแยกต่างระดับบางควาย	Bang Woa Spur Route	8
Chachoengsao	Bang Pakong	46.69	Mueang Chachoengsao ( Siri Sothon)	Bang Pakong Interchange	ทางแยกต่างระดับบางปะกง	Bang Pakong ( Siri Sothon)	8
Chachoengsao	Bang Pakong		Bang Pakong Tollgate	ด่านเก็บเงินบางปะกง			8
Chachoengsao	Bang Pakong	48.00	Bang Pakong River Bridge	สะพานแม่น้ำบางปะกง			8
Chachoengsao	Bang Pakong	49.30	Bang Pakong Service Area	จุดบริการบางปะกง			8
Chonburi	Mueang Chonburi	65.37	Phanat Nikhom ( Suk Prayoon)	Phan Thong Interchange	ทางแยกต่างระดับพานทอง	Mueang Chonburi ( Suk Prayoon)	8
Chonburi	Mueang Chonburi		Phan Thong Tollgate	ด่านเก็บเงินพานทอง			8
Chonburi	Mueang Chonburi	72.50	Nong Ri Rest Stop	จุดพักรถหนองรี			8
Chonburi	Mueang Chonburi	72.55	Ban Bueng ( Route 344)	Chonburi Interchange	ทางแยกต่างระดับชลบุรี	Mueang Chonburi ( Route 344)	8
Chonburi	Mueang Chonburi		Chonburi Tollgate	ด่านเก็บเงินชลบุรี			8
Chonburi	Mueang Chonburi	78.80	No exit	Khiri Nakhon Interchange	ทางแยกต่างระดับคีรีนคร	Nong Khang Khok Spur Route	8
Chonburi	Mueang Chonburi		Khiri Nakhon Tollgate	ด่านเก็บเงินคีรีนคร			8
Chonburi	Si Racha		Si Racha Service Center	ศูนย์บริการศรีราชา			6
Chonburi	Si Racha	99.70	Phanom Sarakham ( AH19 Route 331)	Nong Kham Interchange	ทางแยกต่างระดับหนองขาม	Laem Chabang Spur Route	6
Chonburi	Si Racha		Nong Kham Tollgate	ด่านเก็บเงินหนองขาม			6
Chonburi	Bang Lamung	116.95	Klaeng ( AH123 Route 36)	Pattaya (Pong) Interchange	ทางแยกต่างระดับพัทยา (โป่ง)	Bang Lamung ( Route 36)	6
Chonburi	Bang Lamung		Pattaya (Pong) Tollgate	ด่านเก็บเงินพัทยา (โป่ง)			6
Chonburi	Bang Lamung	119.80	No exit	Map Prachan Interchange	ทางแยกต่างระดับมาบประชัน	Pattaya Spur Route	6
Chonburi	Bang Lamung	132.00	No exit	Huai Yai Interchange	ทางแยกต่างระดับห้วยใหญ่	Ban Amphoe Spur Route	6
Chonburi	Bang Lamung		Bang Lamung Service Area	จุดบริการบางละมุง			6
Rayong	Ban Chang	143.00	Phanom Sarakham	Khao Shi Aon Interchange	ทางแยกต่างระดับเขาชีโอน	Sattahip	6
Rayong	Ban Chang		Map Ta Phut Tollgate	ด่านเก็บเงินมาบตาพุด			6
Rayong	Ban Chang	149.85	Sattahip ( Sukhumvit Road)	U-Tapao Interchange	ทางแยกต่างระดับอู่ตะเภา	Mueang Rayong ( Sukhumvit Road)	6
Bang Wua Motorway Spur
Location		km	Northbound exits (read up)	Facility		Southbound exits (read down)	Lanes
Province	District	km	Northbound exits (read up)	English	Thai	Southbound exits (read down)	Lanes
Chachoengsao	Bang Pakong	0.00	Bangkok ( Main Route)	Bang Khwai Interchange	ทางแยกต่างระดับบางควาย	Ban Chang ( Main Route)	8
Chachoengsao	Bang Pakong	4.00	Mueang Chonburi ( Debaratna)	Bang Wua Interchange	ทางแยกต่างระดับบางวัว	Bang Na ( Debaratna)	8
Nong Khang Khok Motorway Spur
Location		km	Northbound exits (read up)	Facility		Southbound exits (read down)	Lanes
Province	District	km	Northbound exits (read up)	English	Thai	Southbound exits (read down)	Lanes
Chonburi	Mueang Chonburi	0.00	Bangkok ( Main Route)	Bang Phra Interchange	ทางแยกต่างระดับบางพระ	Ban Chang ( Main Route)	8
Chonburi	Mueang Chonburi	3.72	Mueang Chonburi ( Route 361)	Nong Khang Khok Interchange	ทางแยกต่างระดับหนองข้างคอก	Bang Pakong ( Route 361)	8
Laem Chabang Motorway Spur
Location		km	Northbound exits (read up)	Facility		Southbound exits (read down)	Lanes
Province	District	km	Northbound exits (read up)	English	Thai	Southbound exits (read down)	Lanes
Chonburi	Si Racha	0.00	Bangkok ( Main Route)	Nong Kham Interchange	ทางแยกต่างระดับหนองขาม	Ban Chang ( Main Route)	6
Chonburi	Si Racha	4.00	Sahapathanapibul PLC Factories (Chonburi Local Road 40-008)	Kao Kilo Interchange	ทางแยกเก้ากิโล	Si Racha (Chonburi Local Road 40-008)	6
Chonburi	Si Racha	5.71	Sahapathanapibul PLC Factories (Chonburi Local Road 40-001)	Thung Sukhla Interchange	ทางแยกทุ่งสุขลา	Thung Sukhla, Ao Udom (Chonburi Local Road 40-001)	6
Chonburi	Si Racha	7.71	Mueang Chonburi ( Sukhumvit Road)	Laem Chabang Interchange	ทางแยกต่างระดับแหลมฉบัง	Bang Lamung ( Sukhumvit Road)	6
Pattaya Motorway Spur
Location		km	Northbound exits (read up)	Facility		Southbound exits (read down)	Lanes
Province	District	km	Northbound exits (read up)	English	Thai	Southbound exits (read down)	Lanes
Chonburi	Bang Lamung	0.00	Bangkok ( Main Route)	Mab Prachan Interchange	ทางแยกต่างระดับมาบประชัน	Ban Chang ( Main Route)	6
Chonburi	Bang Lamung	3.08	Ban Nong Prue (Provincial Highway 3240)	Nong Prue Interchange	ทางแยกหนองปรือ	Ban Na Kluea (Provincial Highway 3240)	6
Chonburi	Bang Lamung	6.16	Si Racha ( Sukhumvit Road)	Pattaya Interchange	ทางแยกต่างระดับพัทยา	Sattahip ( Sukhumvit Road)	6
Ban Amphoe Motorway Spur
Location		km	Northbound exits (read up)	Facility		Southbound exits (read down)	Lanes
Province	District	km	Northbound exits (read up)	English	Thai	Southbound exits (read down)	Lanes
Chonburi	Bang Lamung	0.00	Bangkok ( Main Route)	Huai Yai Interchange	ทางแยกต่างระดับห้วยใหญ่	Ban Chang ( Main Route)	6
Chonburi	Bang Lamung	2.00	Ban Sak Ngaew (Chonburi Local Road 38-020)	Unnamed Interchange	-	Ban Huai Yai (Chonburi Local Road 38-020)	6
Chonburi	Bang Lamung	5.00	Ban Na Chom Thian (Chonburi Local Road 38-005)	Unnamed Interchange	-	Ban Huai Yai (Chonburi Local Road 38-005)	6
Chonburi	Bang Lamung	7.85	Si Racha ( Sukhumvit Road)	Ban Amphoe Interchange	ทางแยกต่างระดับบ้านอำเภอ	Sattahip ( Sukhumvit Road)	6

== Toll rates ==
These are toll rates of Motorway Route 7 in 9 tollgates. The toll rates is in Thai Baht (4 wheels/6 wheels/over 6 wheels).

AH19 AH123 Bangkok−Ban Chang Motorway Toll rates
Lat Krabang								
25/45/60	Bang Bo							
30/45/70	10/15/20	Bang Pakong						
45/75/110	25/45/65	15/25/40	Phanat Nikhom					
55/90/140	35/55/80	30/45/70	10/15/20	Ban Bueng				
65/100/140	40/65/95	30/45/70	10/20/30	10/15/20	Bang Phra			
90/130/190	60/100/145	50/80/120	30/50/75	25/40/60	20/30/45	Nong Kham		
100/160/235	80/130/190	70/115/165	50/85/120	40/70/105	40/60/90	15/30/40	Pong	
105/170/245	85/135/195	75/120/170	55/90/130	45/75/110	40/65/100	10/15/50	10/15/20	Pattaya
