= Bangkok International Trade and Exhibition Centre =

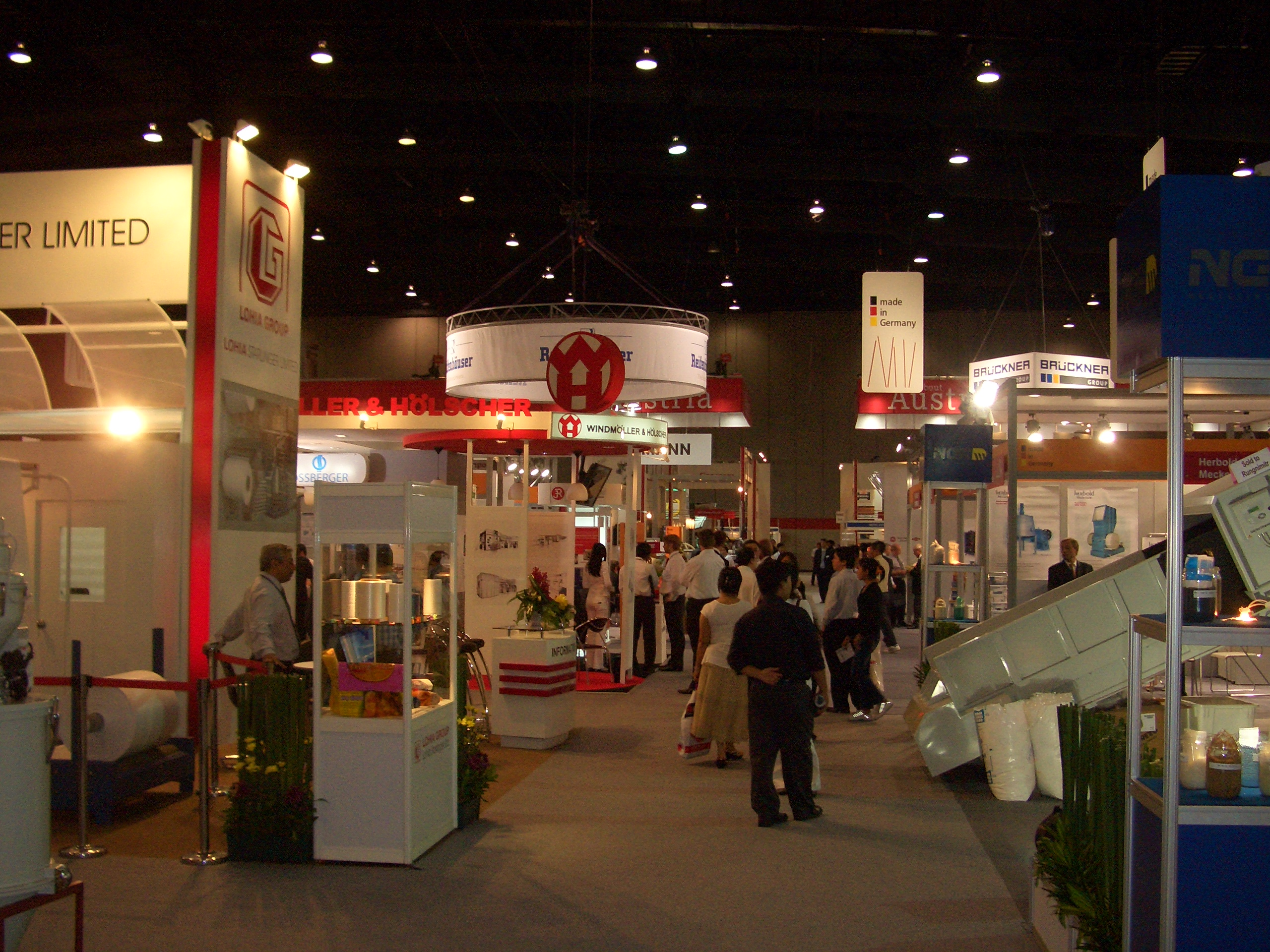
- Interactive map of Bangkok International Trade and Exhibition Centre
- Address: 88 Debaratana Road, Bang Na, Bangkok 10260, Thailand
- Location: Bangkok, Thailand
- Coordinates: 13°40′9″N 100°36′36″E
- Owner: Bhiraj Buri Group
- Capacity: 43,300 (Event Hall)
- Public transit: BTS Bang Na

Construction
- Opened: 1997
- Expanded: 2016

Website
- www.bitec.co.th www.bitecburi.com

The Bangkok International Trade and Exhibition Centre (BITEC) is a convention and exhibition hall in Bang Na District, Bangkok, Thailand. It opened in 1997 and has a total floor area of 54,000 square metres (580,000 sq ft). It hosted the annual Bangkok International Motor Show from 1998 to 2010.

== Location ==
BITEC is located on Debaratna Road (Also known as Bang Na–Trat Highway), near the intersection with Sukhumvit Road in Bang Na. It is served by Bang Na BTS station via a skywalk.

== Entertainment events ==
Entertainment events at Bangkok International Trade and Exhibition Centre
Date	Artist	Event	Ref
2024
24 February	Im Yoon-ah	"Yoonite" Fan Meeting Tour	
6 April	Wheein	Whee In 1st World Tour: Whee In The Mood [Beyond]	
13 November	Lisa	Lisa Fan Meetup in Asia	
23 November	Imagine Dragons	Loom World Tour	
2025
25-26 January	Yoasobi	Chō-genjitsu Asia Tour	
15 March	Yugyeom	Yugyeom Tour [TRUSTY] Encore	
6-7 September	Baekhyun	Reverie World Tour	
