= Luangphor Viriyang Sirintharo =

Thai Buddhist monk (1920–2020)

Somdet Phra Ñāṇavajirottama (Viriyang Sirindharo)
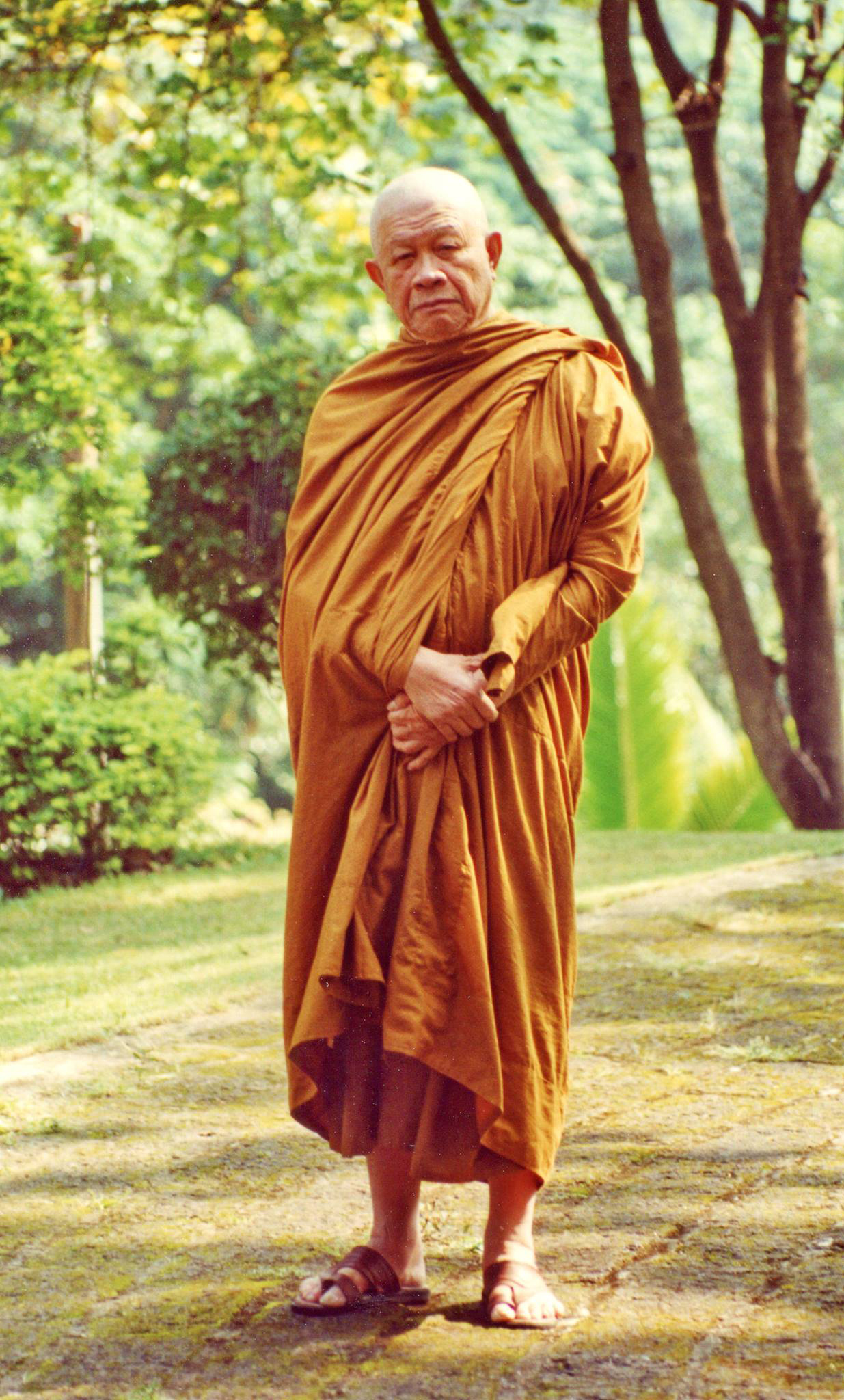
- Title: Somdet Phra Yanawachirodom (2020)

Personal life
- Born: Viriyang Boonteekul; 7 January 1920 Saraburi, Thailand
- Died: 22 December 2020 (aged 100) Bangkok Hospital, Bangkok, Thailand
- Other name: Luang Phor Viriyang Sirintharo
- Occupation: Buddhist monk

Religious life
- Religion: Buddhism
- School: Theravada, Dhammayuttika Nikaya
- Dharma names: Sirindharo
- Ordination: 20 May 1941, aged 21

Senior posting
- Teacher: Ajahn Gong Ma, Ajahn Mun Bhuridatta
- Website: willpowerinstitute.com willpowerinstituteusa.com dhammamongkol.com

Somdet Phra Ñāṇavajirottama (Thai: สมเด็จพระญาณวชิโรดม; RTGS: Somdet Phra Yanawachirodom; born Viriyang Boonteekul, 7 January 1920 – 22 December 2020), also known as Luang Phor Viriyang Sirindharo (Thai: วิริยังค์ สิรินฺธโร), was a Thai monk, Meditation Master and Patriarch of the Dhammayuttika Nikaya Order in Canada. He was born in Saraburi, Thailand.

After recovering from a severe illness, Viriyang was inspired to dedicate his life to follow the Buddha’s path. He was ordained as a bhikkhu monk in 1941. He founded Wat Dhammamongkol, where he was the Abbot of the temple. It houses the statue of the world’s largest green Jade Buddha commonly known as the Jade Buddha Wat Dhammamongkol. Throughout his life, Viriyang was admired by many for his Buddhist teachings, his promotion in the teaching of meditation, and charitable works. In 1975, Viriyang founded the Prateep Dek Thai project, an early childhood development programme for children aged 2 to 6 that has since expanded to 2,000 centres throughout Thailand in 2021.

As a meditation master enthusiast, Viriyang promoted the teaching of meditation training throughout Thailand and abroad. He served as a Meditation Master and founded the Willpower Institute, which provides meditation programmes to support people to meditate with the purpose of propagating meditation, reduce world conflict and also attain world peace. By 2021, the institution had grown and operates in Thailand, United States of America, Canada and Australia.

Viriyang received a number of honours, including the 2005 Knight of the Order of the Star of Italian Solidarity, and the 2010 Medal for Culture from World Fellowship of Buddhists. Viriyang died on 22 December 2020, at age 100.

== Early life ==
Viriyang was born Viriyang Boonteekul (Thai: วิริยังค์ บุญฑีย์กุล) on 7 January 1920 (Note: He was born on 7 January 1920 according to the 1889 Thai solar calendar by King Chulalongkorn. Until 1941, King Ananda Mahidol used the present Thai calendar based on the Gregorian calendar in which the date was 7 January 1921.) at Pak Phriao station (present-day Saraburi railway station) in Saraburi, Thailand. He was the fifth child from the seven of Khun Phenpaschanarom and Mun Boonteekul. Khun Phenpaschanarom was a train station master. During his career, Khun Phenpaschanarom was ordered to move for work to Nakhorn Ratchasima and Ubon Ratchathani in the Northeast Thailand, taking the whole family with him. Viriyang’s family went back to Nakhorn Ratchasima, where Khun Phenpaschanarom retired to a life of farming. Viriyang’s other siblings were Kimlung Choowech, Theekayu Boonteekul, Suchitang Boonteekul, Sajjang Boonteekul, Chaimanu Boonteekul, Saimanee Sritongsuk.

== Youth ==
=== Education ===
As a boy, Viriyang was educated at Wat Supattanaram School (present-day Somdej School) in Ubon Ratchathani where he completed his basic studies. Viriyang, then 11 years old, was sent to study Pali at Wat Klang (present-day Wat Phra Narai Maharat) in Nakhorn Ratchasima where he was bullied by other students and received harsh punishment by the abbot of the temple. He ran away after the punishment and was found later by a friend and brought back to the temple. Several weeks after the event, the abbot of the temple sent him to stay at Wat Ban Si Mun (present-day Wat Si Mun Nuea) in Nakhorn Ratchasima. However, while he was there, he didn't learn any new knowledge, so his parents came to take him back home as they were worried about his future.

=== Buddhism and Meditation Path ===
Viriyang’s lifelong interest in Buddhism and meditation dated from his childhood in Nakhorn Ratchasima. At age 13, a friend asked Viriyang to escort her to Wat Pa Sawang Arom, a local village temple for educational instruction. During the visit, Viriyang encountered a largely unexpected and transformative experience with the practice of meditation. Without years of practice, or formal education in religion, he realized that he had suddenly received knowledge of meditation for the first time. This significant event raised his spirits toward Buddhism. Eventually, the abbot of the temple, Phra Ajahn Gong Ma, had become his first spiritual mentor.

After his father retired and other siblings went to study in Bangkok, Viriyang had to work hard to help out the family. One day while at work, he collapsed and was paralysed at his lower torso. This had caused him to lay stricken for around a month where his parents tried to find someone with the ability to restore his health. It was here where he made a vow to dedicate his life to follow the Buddha’s path for the betterment of humankind, if he were to be cured. He was successfully cured after seven days from making the vow by a white robed ascetic. At the age of 16, Viriyang was ordained as a novice and followed his mentor, Phra Ajahn Gong Ma, to journey together across rainforests and jungles throughout Thailand for eight years, observing ascetic practices of the Thai Forest Tradition of Theravada Buddhism. In 1941, Viriyang was ordained as a bhikkhu monk in Chanthaburi. Following his dhutanga austerities in the same year, he was introduced to Phra Ajahn Gong Ma’s mentor, Phra Ajahn Mun Bhuridatta in Sakon Nakhon. He would study under Phra Ajahn Mun Bhuridatta, practicing advanced meditation techniques over the next 4 years, and with his teacher’s permission, he would later publish a scholarly collection of Phra Ajahn Mun Bhuridatta’s teachings called Mutthothai.

== Later in Life and Charity Work ==
In addition to teaching Buddhism and Meditation, Viriyang had founded and constructed numerous temples in Thailand and Canada, schools, early childhood development centres, a district office, and some non-profit organisations during his lifetime.

=== Sustainable Support for Children ===
The Prateep Dek Thai project is a childcare and early childhood development programme cooperating with the Thai Community Development Department founded in 1975 by Viriyang. Aimed to support children aged 2 to 6 years to develop their physical, mental, emotional, social and intellectual skills properly and appropriately for their age. This also helped alleviate the burden on parents who do not have the time or privilege to take care of their own. Viriyang believed the early years of a child’s life set the stage for all the future growth, and investing in the early years is one of the smartest things a country can do to create the human capital for developing the country in the future. By 2021, the project had grown to more than 2,000 centres across Thailand.

=== Meditation Master ===
For several years, between 1986 and 1991 at Mae Klang Waterfall Buddhist College (present-day Wat Thep Chitiyachan) in Chiangmai, he wrote the series of three Meditation Instructor Course books, based on the education he received from Phra Ajahn Mun Bhuridatta. The books were comprehensive in both the theory and practice of meditation, which he would also use for teaching his students. For his meditation course, Meditation Instructor Course, Viriyang had compressed the Meditation Instructor course’s content from 20 years of meditation practice to 6 months of intensive instruction, in an effort to better accommodate the expectations and demands of our fast-paced postmodern world. In 1997, Viriyang founded the Willpower Institute in Thailand, a non-profit organisation, aimed to promote world peace through meditation. The organisation was for people of all faiths or of no-faith, where they could attend with the focus on teaching meditation theory and meditation practice rather than on religion. He believed that if enough people practiced meditation, spiritual enlightenment could be attained together with world peace globally. On 24 July 1997, the Viriyang’s first course was taught. The institute has since expanded to United States of America, Canada and Australia. As of 2021, there are currently more than 200 centres across Thailand. Viriyang continued teaching and promoting meditation to people in Thailand and abroad throughout his life time.

=== Cooperation Between Italy and Thailand ===
In 2000, Viriyang founded Chanapatana International Design Institute which had an aim on developing Thai designers and Thai products. Branding and design were the keys ideas. This idea was a result of the 1997 Asian financial crisis, which was caused by the significant devaluation of Thai baht. He believed that with enough encouragement, the Thai people themselves were capable of bringing their country out of the crisis. Later in 2006, he received the Knight of the Order of the Star of Italian Solidarity; for his contribution to a closer cooperation between Italy and Thailand from the government of Italy.

=== Buddhist Temples ===
List of Buddhist Temples Somdet Phra Yanawachirodom founded

Country	Date	Name and Place
Thailand	1943	Wat Ban Huai Khaen, Sakhon Nakhon
Thailand	1944	Wat Viriya Pala Ram, Sakhon Nakhon
Thailand	1946-1948	Wat Manee Khireewong (Wat Gong Si Rai), Chanthaburi
Thailand	1949-1952	Wat Damrong Thammaram, Chanthaburi
Thailand	1950	Wat Sathaporn Pattanaram, Chanthaburi
Thailand	1963	Wat Dhammamongkol, Bangkok
Thailand	1968	Wat Nong Krang (Kamphaeng Saen Buddhist College), Nakhon Pathom
Thailand	1969	Wat Phong Ploy Viriyaram, Bangkok
Thailand	1969	Wat Siri Kamala Vas, Bangkok
Thailand	1970	Wat Amattayaram, Prachinburi
Thailand	1970	Wat Thep Chitiyachan (Mae Klang Waterfall Buddhist College), Chiang Mai
Thailand	1971	Wat Chujit Thammaram (Mahavajiralongkorn Buddhist College), Ayutthaya
Thailand	1973	Wat Kaewpithak Charoentham, Bangkok
Canada	1992	Yanviriya Temple I, Vancouver
Canada	1993	Yanviriya Temple II, Toronto
Canada	1995	Ratchathamviriyaram Temple I, Ottawa
Canada	1997	Ratchathamviriyaram Temple II, Niagara Falls
Canada	1998	Ratchathamviriyaram Temple III, Edmonton
Canada	1999	Ratchathamviriyaram Temple IV, Calgary
Thailand	2012	Wat Sriratana Dhammaram, Samut Prakan
Thailand	2017	Wat Pa Lert Dhammanimit, Pathum Thani

== Death ==
Viriyang died of old age on 22 December 2020 at Bangkok Hospital, aged 100, one month before his 101st birthday. King Vajiralongkorn bestowed an honorary decorated funeral urn for him and has accepted his remains into perpetual royal care.

== Honours ==
Viriyang was a member of the Sangha Supreme Council, with King Bhumibol Adulyadej and Queen Sirikit, and other members of the Royal Household, placing great faith in him, leading to his rapid ascension through the Buddhist clergy in Thailand. He held several titles throughout his life. Viriyang was given the title Somdet Phra Yanawachirodom, appointed by Vajiralongkorn on 1 November 2020.

=== Honours Buddhist Monk Appointments ===
List of ecclesiastical peerage ranks and titles

Date	Title	Appointment
1955	Phrakhru Yanaviriya	Phrakhru sanyabat chan ek
1967	Phra Yanaviriyajan	Phraracha kana
1992	Phra Rajadhammajetiyajan	Phraracha kana chan rath
2002	Phra Tepjetiyajan	Phraracha kana chan thep, vipassana dhura order
2010	Phra Dhammamongkolyan	Phraracha kana chan tham, vipassana dhura order
2019	Phra Phrommongkolyan	Phraracha kana chao kana rong
2020	Somdet Phra Yanawachirodom	Somdet Phraracha kana

=== Scholastic ===
Honorary degrees

Country	Date	School	Degree
Thailand	1995	National Institute of Development Administration	Doctor of Development Administration (DDA)
Thailand	2002	Suan Sunandha Rajabhat University	Doctor of Education (EdD)
Thailand	2002	Mahamakut Buddhist University	Doctor of Philosophy in Buddhist Studies (PhD)
Thailand	2007	National University	Doctor of Arts (DA)
Thailand	2010	Chiang Rai Rajabhat University	Doctor of Arts (DA)
Thailand	2011	Rajabhat Rajanagarindra University	Doctor of Philosophy in management (PhD)
Thailand	2012	Mahachulalongkornrajavidyalaya University	Doctor of Arts in Buddhist Studies (DA)
Thailand	2013	Rajamangala University of Technology Suvarnabhumi	Doctor of Arts (DA)
Thailand	2014	King Mongkut's University of Technology North Bangkok	Doctor of Philosophy in Civil Engineering and Technology (PhD)
Thailand	2016	Suan Sunandha Rajabhat University	Doctor of Philosophy in Philosophy and Ethics (PhD)
Thailand	2016	Chiang Mai University	Doctor of Philosophy in Philosophy and Religion (PhD)
Thailand	2017	Phranakhon Rajabhat University	Doctor of Philosophy in Development Strategy (PhD)
Thailand	2017	King Mongkut's Institute of technology Ladkrabang	Doctor of Philosophy in Computer Science (PhD)
Thailand	2019	The University of Phayao	Doctor of Education in Educational Administration (EdD)
Thailand	2021	North Bangkok University	Doctor of Philosophy in Educational Administration (PhD)
