= Phra Khanong Tai =

Phra Khanong Tai พระโขนงใต้
- Khwaeng
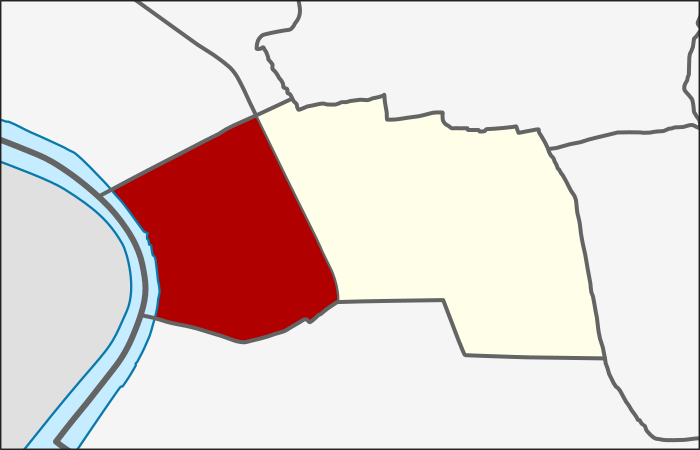
- Location in Phra Khanong District
- Country: Thailand
- Province: Bangkok
- Khet: Phra Khanong

Area
  - Total: 5.171 km^{2} (1.997 sq mi)

Population (2020)
  - Total: 20,941
- Time zone: UTC+7 (ICT)
- Postal code: 10260
- TIS 1099: 100910

Phra Khanong Tai (Thai: พระโขนงใต้, pronounced [pʰráʔ kʰā.nǒːŋ tâːj]) is a khwaeng (subdistrict) of Phra Khanong District, in Bangkok, Thailand. In 2020, it had a total population of 20,941 people.
