= Bang Chak, Phra Khanong =

Bang Chak บางจาก
- Khwaeng
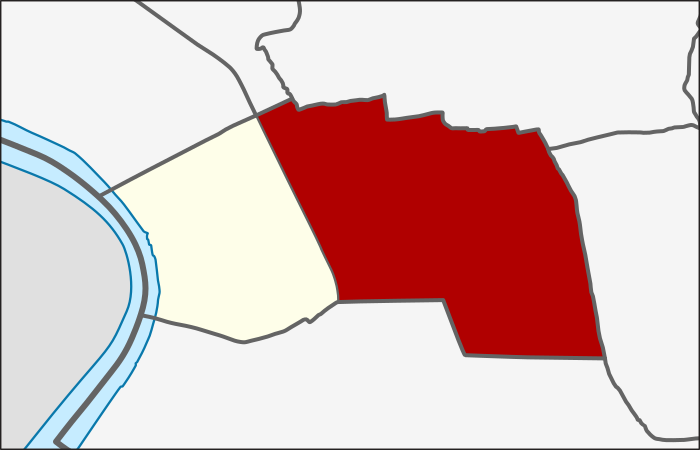
- Location in Phra Khanong District
- Country: Thailand
- Province: Bangkok
- Khet: Phra Khanong

Area
  - Total: 8.815 km^{2} (3.403 sq mi)

Population (2020)
  - Total: 66,915
- Time zone: UTC+7 (ICT)
- Postal code: 10260
- TIS 1099: 100905

Bang Chak (Thai: บางจาก, pronounced [bāːŋ t͡ɕàːk]) is a khwaeng (subdistrict) of Phra Khanong District, in Bangkok, Thailand. In 2020, it had a total population of 66,915 people.
