= Chanapatana International Design Institute =

Design school in Thailand

Coordinates: 13.68784°N 100.61512°E

- Seal of Chanapatana International Design Institute
- Other names: CIDI Chanapatana
- Motto: If Life is Design!
- Type: Foundation
- Established: 2000
- President: Sakorn Suksriwong, DBA
- Location: Bangkok, Thailand
- Website: www.chanapatana.com

Chanapatana International Design Institute (CIDI Chanapatana; Thai: สถาบันออกแบบนานาชาติชนาพัฒน์) is one of the first international schools of design in Thailand. It was founded in 2000 by Somdet Phra Yanawachirodom in co-operation with the leading design school in Florence, Italy. Operating under Luang Phor Viriyang Sirintharo Foundation, the school offers the following international diploma programs:

- Interior & Product design
- Fashion design
