= Bang Na Nuea =

Bang Na Nuea บางนาเหนือ
- Khwaeng
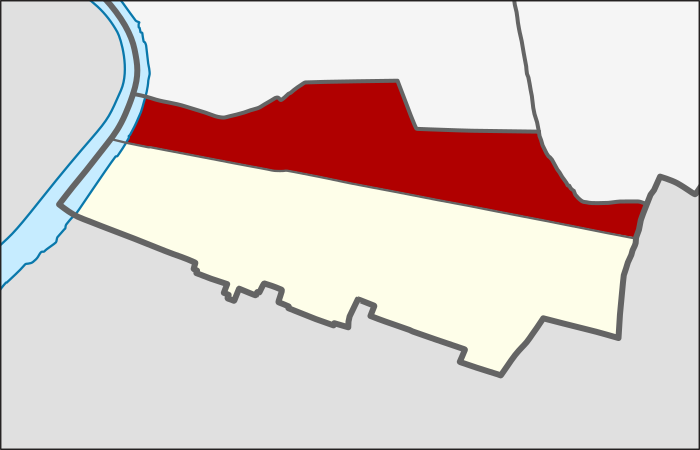
- Location in Bang Na District
- Country: Thailand
- Province: Bangkok
- Khet: Bang Na

Area
  - Total: 5.161 km^{2} (1.993 sq mi)

Population (2020)
  - Total: 40,897
- Time zone: UTC+7 (ICT)
- Postal code: 10260
- TIS 1099: 104702

Bang Na Nuea (Thai: บางนาเหนือ, pronounced [bāːŋ nāː nɯ̌a̯]) is a khwaeng (subdistrict) of Bang Na District, in Bangkok, Thailand. In a census of 2020, it had a total population of 40,897 people.
