= On Nut BTS station =

On Nut อ่อนนุช
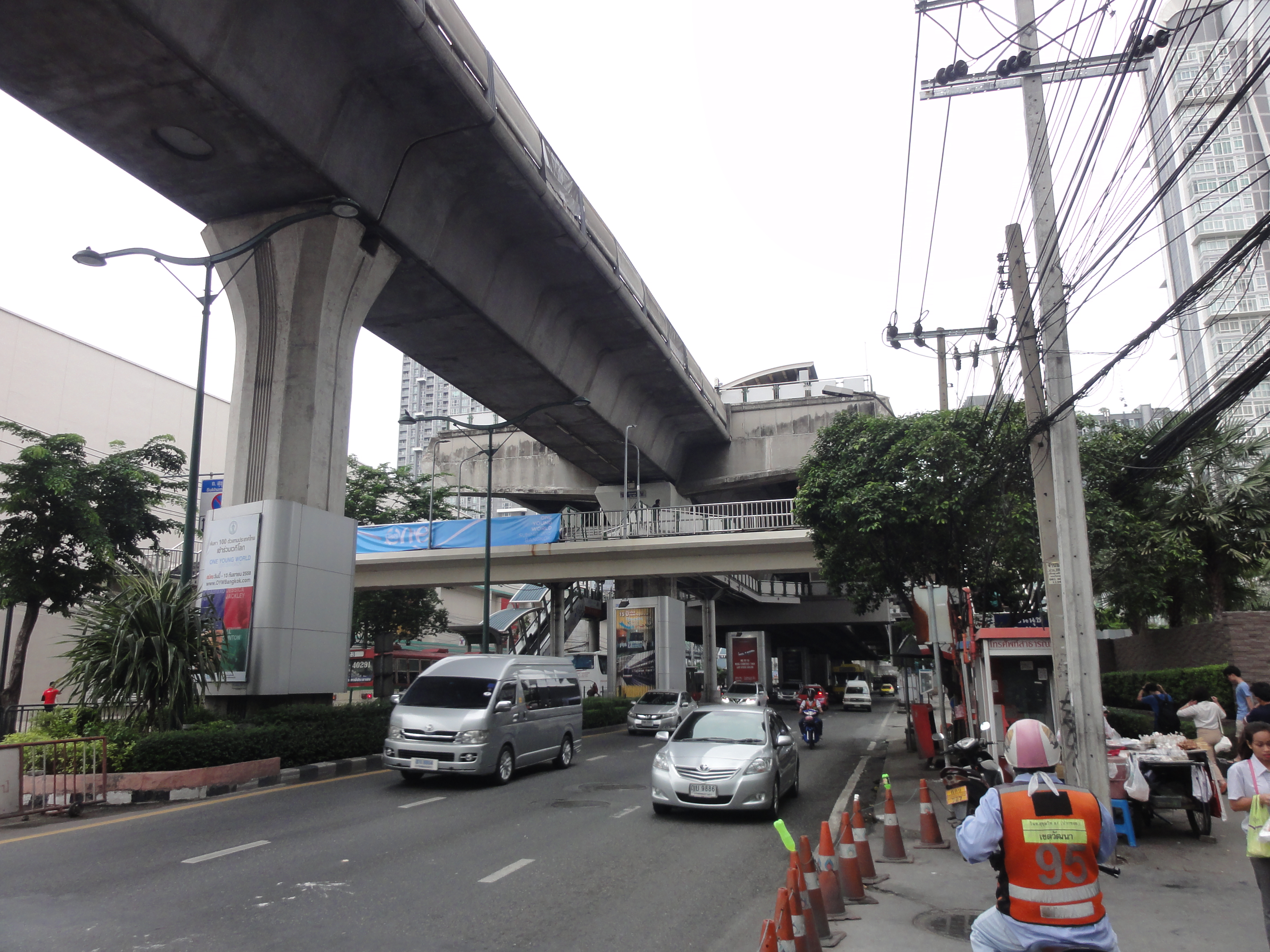
- On Nut BTS station in 2015

General information
- Location: Khlong Toei, Watthana and Phra Khanong District; Bangkok; Thailand
- Coordinates: 13°42′20.20″N 100°36′3.90″E
- System: BTS
- Owner: Bangkok Metropolitan Administration (BMA); BTS Rail Mass Transit Growth Infrastructure Fund (BTSGIF)
- Operator: Bangkok Mass Transit System; Public Company Limited (BTSC)
- Line: Sukhumvit Line

Other information
- Station code: E9

History
- Opened: 5 December 1999

Passengers
- 2021: 4,238,083

Services
Preceding station	BTS Skytrain	Following station
Phra Khanong towards Khu Khot	Sukhumvit Line	Bang Chak towards Kheha
Location

On Nut Station Traditional sign

On Nut station (Thai: สถานีอ่อนนุช, pronounced [sā.tʰǎː.nīː ʔɔ̀ːn nút]), station code E09, is a BTS Skytrain station on the Sukhumvit line at the tripoint of Bangkok; Khlong Toei, Watthana; and Phra Khanong. The station is located on Sukhumvit Road to the south of On Nut junction (On Nut Road).

On Nut station is connected via walkway to both a Tesco Lotus and Century The Movie Plaza Sukhumvit. It was the terminus of the Sukhumvit Line when the line first opened on 5 December 1999 from there to Mo Chit. Between 1999 and 2011, it was on the eastern terminus of the line until the opening of the 5.2-km extension to Bearing Station. Inside the station gate are ATMs, chemistry labs and small businesses.

== See also ==
- Bangkok Skytrain
