= Bang Na Tai =

Bang Na Tai บางนาใต้
- Khwaeng
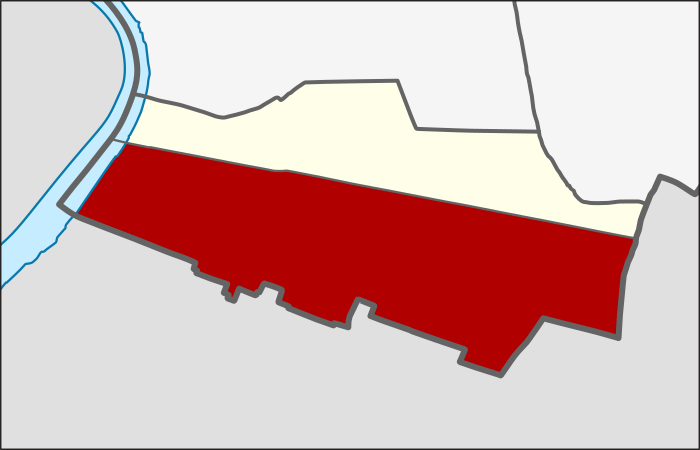
- Location in Bang Na District
- Country: Thailand
- Province: Bangkok
- Khet: Bang Na

Area
  - Total: 13.628 km^{2} (5.262 sq mi)

Population (2020)
  - Total: 47,638
- Time zone: UTC+7 (ICT)
- Postal code: 10260
- TIS 1099: 104703

Bang Na Tai (Thai: บางนาใต้, pronounced [bāːŋ nāː tâːj]) is a khwaeng (subdistrict) of Bang Na District, in Bangkok, Thailand. In 2020, it had a total population of 47,638 people.
