= Bearing BTS station =

Skytrain station in Bang Na, Bangkok

Bearing แบริ่ง
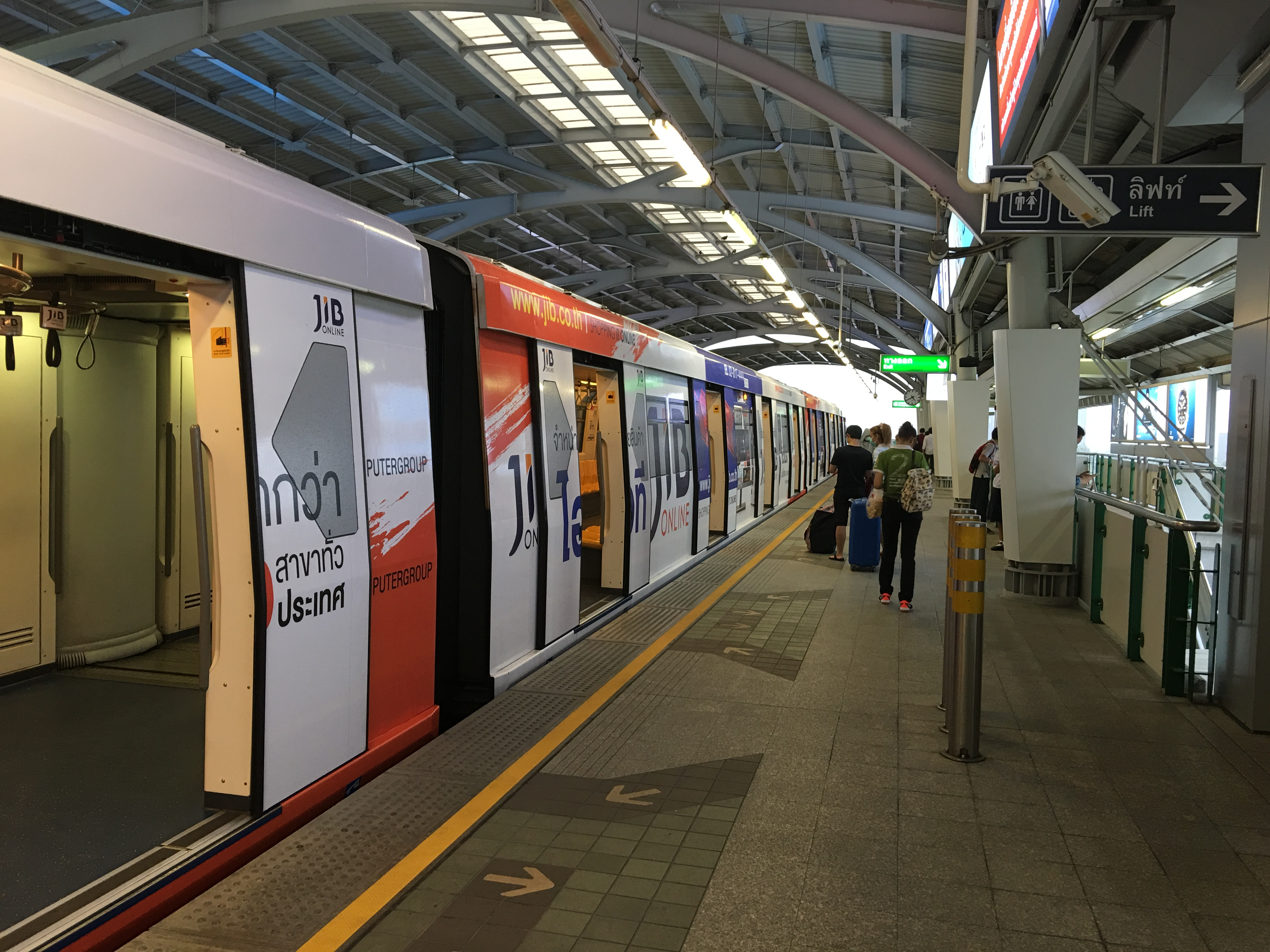

General information
- Location: Bang Na, Bangkok, Thailand
- Coordinates: 13°39′33.61″N 100°36′3.78″E
- System: BTS
- Owner: Bangkok Metropolitan Administration (BMA)
- Operator: Bangkok Mass Transit System; Public Company Limited (BTSC)
- Line: Sukhumvit Line

Other information
- Station code: E14

History
- Opened: 12 August 2011
- Former names: Sukhumvit 107

Passengers
- 2021: 2,662,421

Services
Preceding station	BTS Skytrain	Following station
Bang Na towards Khu Khot	Sukhumvit Line	Samrong towards Kheha
Location

Bearing Station Traditional sign

Bearing station (Thai: สถานีแบริ่ง, RTGS: Sathani Baering, pronounced [sā.tʰǎː.nīː bɛ̄ː.rîŋ]) is a BTS skytrain station, on the Sukhumvit Line in Bang Na District, Bangkok, Thailand. The station is located on Sukhumvit Road at Soi Bearing (Soi Sukhumvit 107), the last point of the BTS system in Bangkok Metropolitan Administration area, before crossing the border into Samrong Nuea in Samut Prakan Province.

It is part of the 5.2 km Skytrain extension from On Nut station which opened on 12 August 2011. Between 2011 and 2017 it was the eastern terminus of the line, until the opening of Samrong station.

St. Andrews Sukhumvit 107 School can be accessed from this BTS station.

== See also ==
- Bangkok Skytrain
