= Bang Na district =

Bang Na บางนา
- Khet
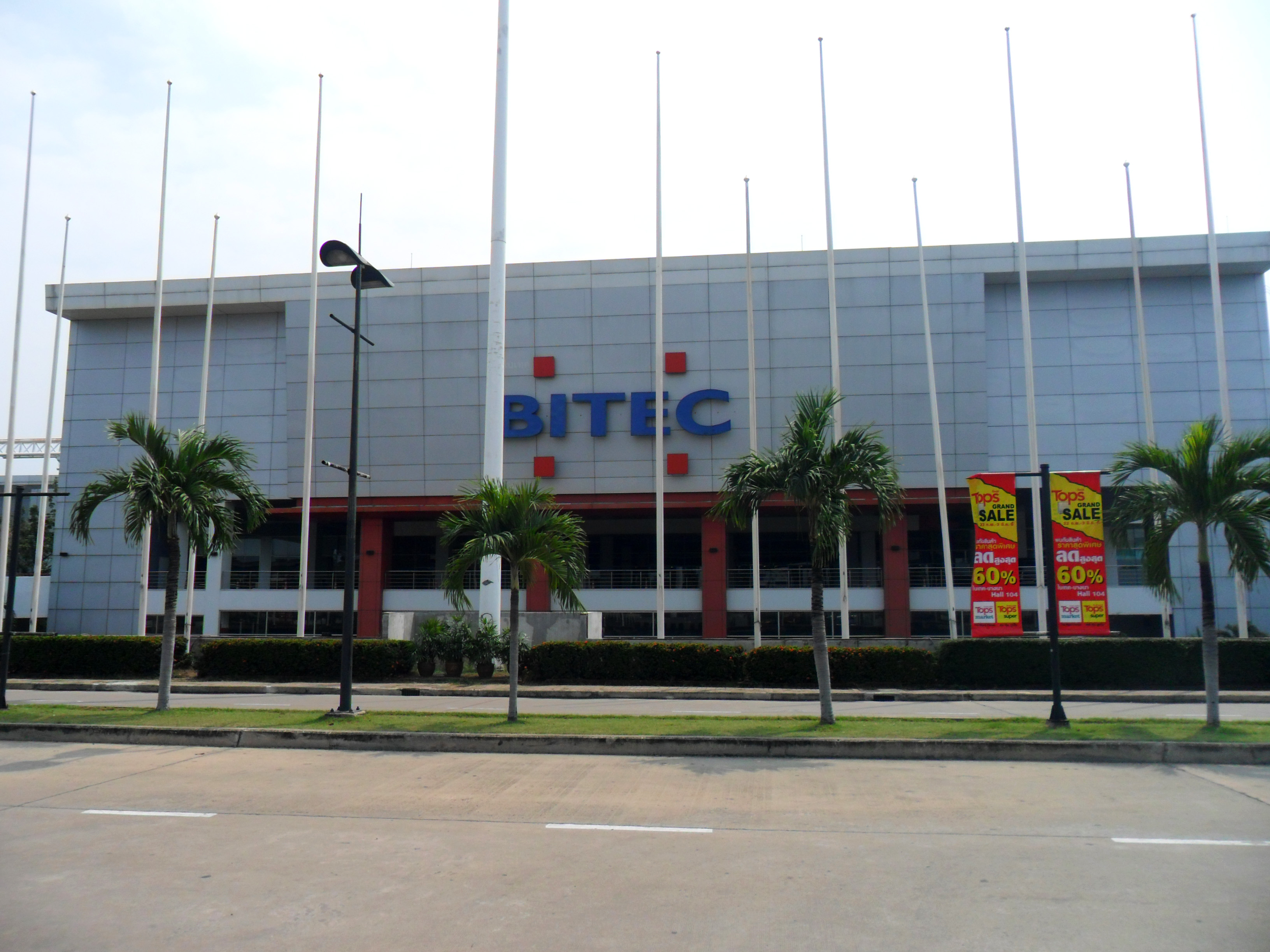
- Bangkok International Trade and Exhibition Centre
- Etymology: A Place of Rice Farms
- Khet location in Bangkok
- Coordinates: 13°40′48.29″N 100°35′30.48″E
- Country: Thailand
- Province: Bangkok
- Seat: Bang Na Nuea
- Khwaeng: 2
- Khet established: 6 March 1998

Area
  - Total: 18.789 km^{2} (7.254 sq mi)

Population (2017)
  - Total: 90,852
  - Density: 4,835.38/km^{2} (12,523.6/sq mi)
- Time zone: UTC+7 (ICT)
- Postal code: 10260
- Geocode: 1047

Bang Na (Thai: บางนา, pronounced [bāːŋ nāː]) is one of the fifty districts (khet) of Bangkok, Thailand. Its neighbors, clockwise from the north, are the Phra Khanong and Prawet Districts of Bangkok and Bang Phli, Mueang Samut Prakan, and Phra Pradaeng Districts of Samut Prakan province.

== History ==
Bang Na was once a sub-district of Phra Khanong. It became a separate district on 6 March 1998.

The name Bang Na means "a place of rice farms", apparently a tribute to the thriving rice fields that dotted this vicinity in the premodern time.

== Administration ==
District map

The district has two sub-districts (khwaeng).

1.	Bang Na Nuea	บางนาเหนือ
2.	Bang Na Tai	บางนาใต้

== Places ==
Bangkok International Trade and Exhibition Centre (BITEC) is a major convention and exhibition center. Among its regularly hosted events is the annual Bangkok International Motor Show. Several temples are in the district: Wat Bang Na Nai (วัดบางนาใน), Wat Bang Na Nok (วัดบางนานอก), Wat Si Iam (วัดศรีเอี่ยม), and Wat Phong Phloi Witthayaram (วัดผ่องพลอยวิทยาราม). CentralPlaza Bangna, formerly Central City Bangna, is one of the first shopping malls in Bang Na. Unlike most shopping centres in Thailand, it has a theme park and water theme park on upper floors. Royal Dragon Restaurant or Mang Korn Lung (มังกรหลวง) formerly held the Guinness Book record as the world's largest restaurant from 1992 to 2008. It is an outdoor seafood restaurant 1.6 hectares in size. Waiters roller-skate to serve food from the kitchen to the tables. As the district flourished from these attractions, on May 5, 2012, one of Thailand's top 10 shopping malls called Megabangna Shopping Center was built. There are department stores, supermarkets, restaurants, movie theater, ice rink, and a game arcade inside the shopping mall. The first branch of IKEA in Thailand was also opened in the complex on November 3, 2011.

== Transportation ==
=== Rail ===
The Sukhumvit Line of the BTS Skytrain runs through the area along Sukhumvit Road. The extension into Bang Na, which is the one of largest highways in the world opened in August 2011 with three stations: Udom Suk, Bang Na, and Bearing. The Bang Na station is about 500 m from BITEC.

MRT Yellow Line passes through the district along the Srinagarindra road. Stations are Si Iam and Si La Salle.

In the future, Bang_Na–Suvarnabhumi_light_rail will link the district to the Suvarnabhumi airport

=== Road ===
Sukhumvit Road and Bang Na-Trat Highway are two main highways linking Bangkok to eastern Thailand. On top of Bang Na-Trat Highway is the 55 km Burapha Withi Expressway reaching Chonburi province. Suvarnabhumi Airport can be accessed from the south via Bang Na-Trat and Burapha Withi as an alternative to the Bangkok-Chonburi Highway (motorway) from the north.
