= Phra Khanong district =

Phra Khanong พระโขนง
- Khet
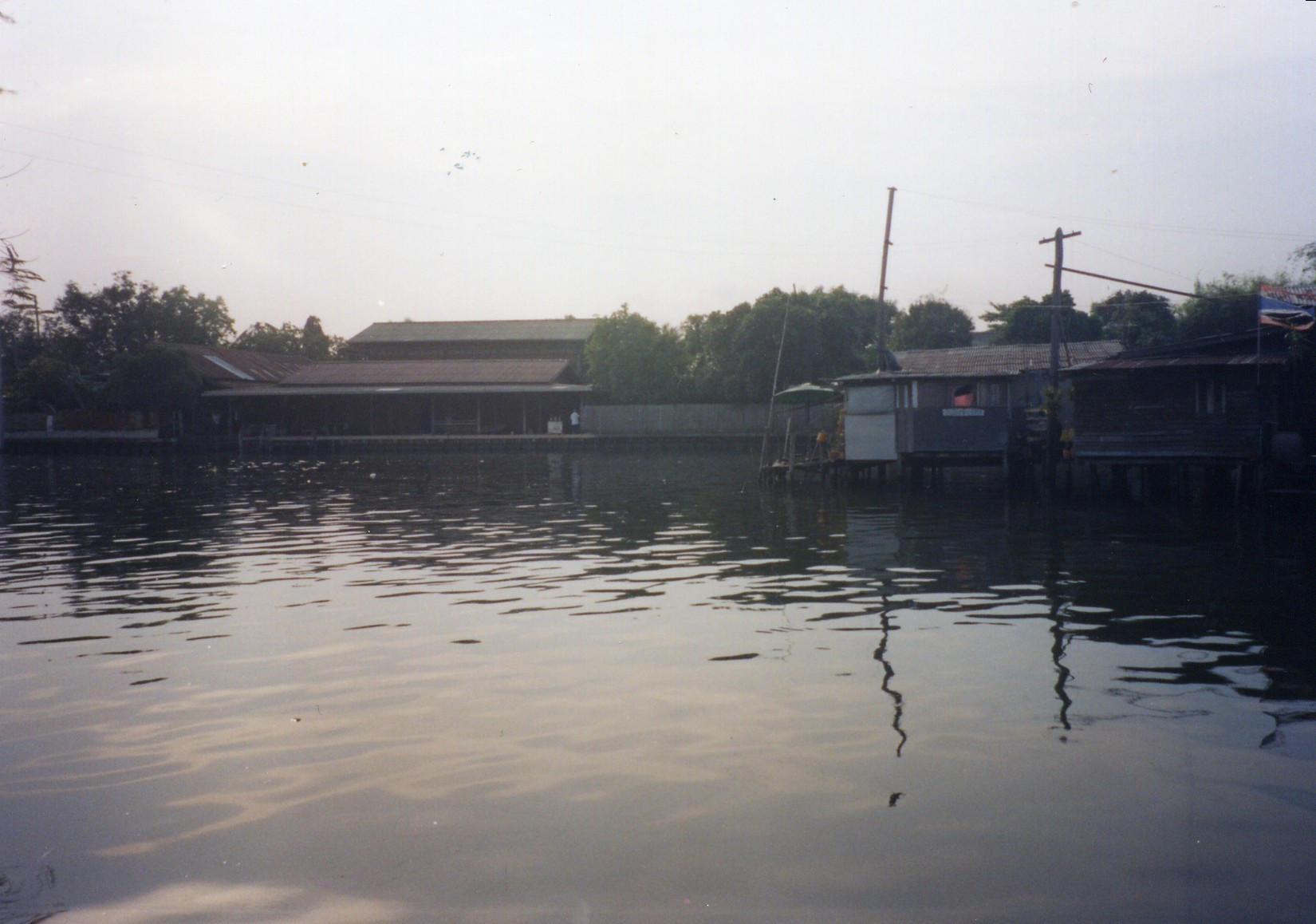
- Phra Khanong Canal View from Wat Maha But famous in the legend of Mae Nak.

- Khet location in Bangkok
- Coordinates: 13°42′8″N 100°36′6″E
- Country: Thailand
- Province: Bangkok
- Seat: Phra Khanong Tai
- Khwaeng: 2

Area
  - Total: 13.986 km^{2} (5.400 sq mi)

Population (2017)
  - Total: 90,354
  - Density: 6,473.18/km^{2} (16,765.5/sq mi)
- Time zone: UTC+7 (THA)
- Postal code: 10260
- Geocode: 1009

Phra Khanong (Thai: พระโขนง, pronounced [pʰráʔ kʰā.nǒːŋ]) is one of the 50 districts (Khet) of Bangkok, Thailand. Its neighbours, clockwise from north, are Suan Luang, Prawet, and Bang Na districts of Bangkok, Phra Pradaeng district of Samut Prakan province (across Chao Phraya River), Khlong Toei and Watthana of Bangkok.

Economy: There is at least one oil refinery in the district (as of the 2020s).

== History ==
Phra Khanong was an amphoe of Nakhon Khuean Khan back in 1902. Nakhon Khuean Khan was renamed to Phra Pradaeng in 1914. In 1927 Phra Khanong was transferred from the then Phra Pradaeng province to Bangkok. It was once very big but it has since been split into several small districts. The districts Khlong Toei, Watthana, Suan Luang, Prawet and Bang Na were all once part of Phra Khanong. Khlong Toei (later split out Watthana) and Prawet (later separate out Suan Luang) districts were carved out of Phra Khanong in 1989. Bang Na was the last district to leave Phra Khanong in 1998.

Even though the administration has been changed, many surrounding areas are still often referred to as Phra Khanong. The Phra Khanong station of Bangkok Skytrain, opened in 1999, is actually outside the Phra Khanong district and located instead in the Phra Khanong Nuea sub-district of Watthana district.

The word Khanong originates from Khmer language and means eyebrow but it was speculated that it may be from Khanon (ขนอน) meaning customhouse. The area has been important gateway from the sea for very long time and the history of Phra Pradaeng dated back to over 1,000 years ago when the area was still ruled by Khmer Empire.

The shrine dedicated to Mae Nak Phra Khanong at Wat Mahabut was situated in the Phra Khanong district until a 1997 boundary change placed it in neighboring Suan Luang district - much to the consternation of the people of Phra Khanong.

== Administration ==
The district has two sub-districts (khwaeng).

No.	Name	Thai	Area (km^{2})	Map
5.	Bang Chak	บางจาก	8.815	Map
10.	Phra Khanong Tai	พระโขนงใต้	5.171	Map
Total			13.986	Map

The missing numbers 1, 2, 3, 4, 6, 7, 8 and 9 belong to the sub-districts which were split off to form Khlong Toei, Bang Na and Prawet districts.

== Places ==
Wat Thammamongkhon (วัดธรรมมงคล) is a landmark in Phra Khanong. The temple has the tallest chedi of its kind in Thailand named Phra Wiriya Mongkhon Maha Chedi (พระวิริยะมงคลมหาเจดีย์). It is a square chedi built to the style of Mahabodhi Temple in Bodh Gaya, India. On the top is decorated with 17 kg of gold and 1,063 diamonds. It also houses large jade Buddha and Kuan Yin images.

Wat Wachiratham Sathit (วัดวชิรธรรมสาธิต), formally called Wat Thung (วัดทุ่ง), is an important temple to the local community. Events are held during Songkran festival in April.

== Transportation ==
A BTS Skytrain route extension, completed in August 2011, has 2 stations in Phra Khanong district: Bang Chak and Punnawithi.

== Education ==
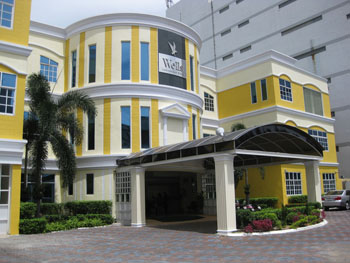
Wells International School On Nut Campus

The Anglo Singapore International School has its Campus 64 in the district. Wells International School operates its On Nut Campus, with primary and secondary classes, in Phra Khanong District. Siam Culinary Academy offering professional culinary training and certification programs in the Phra Khanong District of Bangkok. Chef Lucas Baking Studio is located in the same district and provides hands-on baking workshops and courses for both hobbyists and aspiring professionals.
