= List of rapid transit stations in Bangkok =

List of rapid train stations in Bangkok, Thailand

The following lists the stations of all urban rail transit systems in Bangkok and the surrounding Bangkok Metropolitan Region, including the BTS, MRT, Airport Rail Link and SRT Red Lines. It does not include the 12 stations of the Bangkok BRT. The table below lists 194 stations in operation, comprising:

- 47 stations on the BTS Sukhumvit Line
- 14 stations on the BTS Silom Line
- 3 stations on the Gold Line
- 38 stations on the MRT Blue Line
- 16 stations on the MRT Purple Line
- 8 stations on the Airport Rail Link
- 10 stations on the SRT Dark Red Line
- 4 stations on the SRT Light Red Line
- 23 stations on the MRT Yellow Line
- 32 stations on the MRT Pink Line

This totals 193 stations, however Siam is shared between the Sukhumvit and Silom lines, and is counted only once and shown once in the table below.

Several interchange stations share the same name but have different identifiers, are counted and appear twice or three times in the table below, for example Phaya Thai (Airport Rail Link and Sukhumvit Line) and Lat Phrao (Blue Line and Yellow Line). In other cases where there are designated interchanges between different networks, the two stations are given different names, such as Asok BTS station to Sukhumvit MRT and these are also counted separately. The Tha Phra station is passed twice in one full ride on the Blue Line but is counted only once.

Many more are currently in various stages of planning and construction as shown in the latest Mass Rapid Transit Master Plan.

== List of stations ==
Code	Station name		Line(s)	Photo	Opened	Transfer to
Code	English	Thai	Line(s)	Photo	Opened	Transfer to
N16	11th Infantry Regiment	กรมทหารราบที่ 11	BTS		5 June 2020	
N5	Ari	อารีย์	BTS		5 December 1999	
E4	Asok	อโศก	BTS		5 December 1999	MRT : Sukhumvit
A3	Ban Thap Chang	บ้านทับช้าง	ARL		23 August 2010	
RW05	Bang Bamru	บางบำหรุ	SRT		2 August 2021	
N15	Bang Bua	บางบัว	BTS		5 June 2020	
E10	Bang Chak	บางจาก	BTS		12 August 2011	
PK27	Bang Chan	บางชัน	MRT		21 November 2023	
YL8	Bang Kapi	บางกะปิ	MRT		12 June 2023	
BL37	Bang Khae	บางแค	MRT		21 September 2019	
RN04	Bang Khen	บางเขน	SRT		2 August 2021	
BL04	Bang Khun Non	บางขุนนนท์	MRT		23 December 2019	MRT (under construction); SRT : Charansanitwong (planned)
PP10	Bang Krasor	บางกระสอ	MRT		12 August 2016	
E13	Bang Na	บางนา	BTS		12 August 2011	
BL08	Bang O	บางอ้อ	MRT		4 December 2019	
BL33	Bang Phai	บางไผ่	MRT		24 August 2019	
BL07	Bang Phlat	บางพลัด	MRT		4 December 2019	
PP04	Bang Phlu	บางพลู	MRT		12 August 2016	
BL09	Bang Pho	บางโพ	MRT		4 December 2019	
PP06	Bang Rak Noi Tha It	บางรักน้อย-ท่าอิฐ	MRT		12 August 2016	
PP05	Bang Rak Yai	บางรักใหญ่	MRT		12 August 2016	
PP15	Bang Son (Purple)	บางซ่อน	MRT		12 August 2016	SRT
RW02	Bang Son (Light Red)	บางซ่อน	SRT		2 August 2021	MRT
BL11	Bang Sue (Blue)	บางซื่อ	MRT		3 July 2004	SRT; SRT; ARL (under construction)
S12	Bang Wa (BTS Silom)	บางหว้า	BTS		5 December 2013	MRT
BL34	Bang Wa (Blue)	บางหว้า	MRT		24 August 2019	BTS
BL05	Bang Yi Khan	บางยี่ขัน	MRT		23 December 2019	
E14	Bearing	แบริ่ง	BTS		12 August 2011	
N21	Bhumibol Adulyadej Hospital	โรงพยาบาลภูมิพลอดุลยเดช	BTS		16 December 2020	
PK08	Chaeng Watthana - Pak Kret 28	แจ้งวัฒนะ-ปากเกร็ด 28	MRT		21 November 2023	
PK11	Chaeng Watthana 14	แจ้งวัฒนะ 14	MRT		21 November 2023	
E17	Chang Erawan	ช้างเอราวัณ	BTS		6 December 2018	
BL02	Charan 13	จรัญฯ 13	MRT		23 December 2019	
G2	Charoen Nakhon (ICONSIAM)	เจริญนคร (ไอคอนสยาม)	MRL		16 December 2020	
BL13	Chatuchak Park	สวนจตุจักร	MRT		3 July 2004	BTS : Mo Chit
RN02	Chatuchak	จตุจักร	SRT		2 August 2021	
E1	Chit Lom	ชิดลม	BTS		5 December 1999	
YL3	Chok Chai 4	โชคชัย 4	MRT	12 June 2023	12 June 2023	
S3	Chong Nonsi	ช่องนนทรี	BTS		5 December 1999	MRL (planned); MRL (planned)
RN08	Don Mueang	ดอนเมือง	SRT		2 August 2021	
E7	Ekkamai	เอกมัย	BTS		5 December 1999	
BL03	Fai Chai	ไฟฉาย	MRT		23 December 2019	
PK12	Government Complex	ศูนย์ราชการเฉลิมพระเกียรติ	MRT		21 November 2023	
N9	Ha Yaek Lat Phrao	ห้าแยกลาดพร้าว	BTS		9 August 2019	MRT : Phahon Yothin
BL28	Hua Lamphong	หัวลำโพง	MRT		3 July 2004	SRT (planned)
A4	Hua Mak (ARL)	หัวหมาก	ARL		23 August 2010	SRT (planned); MRT
YL11	Hua Mak (Yellow)	หัวหมาก	MRT		3 June 2023	ARL; SRT (planned)
BL18	Huai Khwang	ห้วยขวาง	MRT		3 July 2004	
MT01	Impact Muang Thong Thani	อิมแพ็ค เมืองทองธานี	MRT		17 June 2025	
BL32	Itsaraphap	อิสรภาพ	MRT		29 July 2019	
YL12	Kalantan	กลันตัน	MRT		3 June 2023	
BL12	Kamphaeng Phet	กำแพงเพชร	MRT		3 July 2004	
RN07	Kan Kheha	การเคหะ	SRT		2 August 2021	
N13	Kasetsart University	มหาวิทยาลัยเกษตรศาสตร์	BTS		4 December 2019	
PK02	Khae Rai	แคราย	MRT		21 November 2023	
E23	Kheha	เคหะฯ	BTS		6 December 2018	
PP01	Khlong Bang Phai	คลองบางไผ่	MRT		12 August 2016	
G3	Khlong San	คลองสาน	MRL		16 December 2020	SRT (planned)
BL24	Khlong Toei	คลองเตย	MRT		3 July 2004	MRL (planned)
PK23	Khu Bon	คู้บอน	MRT		21 November 2023	
N24	Khu Khot	คูคต	BTS		16 December 2020	
RN01	Krung Thep Aphiwat Central (Dark Red)	กลางกรุงเทพอภิวัฒน์	SRT		2 August 2021	MRT; SRT; ARL (under construction)
RW01	Krung Thep Aphiwat Central (Light Red)	กลางกรุงเทพอภิวัฒน์	SRT		2 August 2021	MRT; SRT; ARL (under construction)
S7	Krung Thon Buri (BTS Silom)	กรุงธนบุรี	BTS		15 May 2009	MRL
G1	Krung Thon Buri (Gold)	กรุงธนบุรี	MRL		16 December 2020	BTS
RN09	Lak Hok (Rangsit University)	หลักหก (มหาวิทยาลัยรังสิต)	SRT		2 August 2021	
RN06	Lak Si (Dark Red)	หลักสี่	SRT		2 August 2021	MRT
PK14	Lak Si (Pink)	หลักสี่	MRT		21 November 2023	SRT
MT02	Lake Muang Thong Thani	ทะเลสาบเมืองทองธานี	MRT		17 June 2025	
BL38	Lak Song	หลักสอง	MRT		21 September 2019	
A2	Lat Krabang	ลาดกระบัง	ARL		23 August 2010	
YL4	Lat Phrao 71	ลาดพร้าว 71	MRT		12 June 2023	MRL (planned)
YL5	Lat Phrao 83	ลาดพร้าว 83	MRT		12 June 2023	
YL7	Lat Phrao 101	ลาดพร้าว 101	MRT		12 June 2023	
BL15	Lat Phrao (Blue)	ลาดพร้าว	MRT		3 July 2004	MRT
YL1	Lat Phrao (Yellow)	ลาดพร้าว	MRT		19 June 2023	MRT
PK18	Lat Pla Khao	ลาดปลาเค้า	MRT		21 November 2023	
BL25	Lumphini	ลุมพินี	MRT		3 July 2004	MRL (planned); MRL (planned)
YL6	Mahat Thai	มหาดไทย	MRT		12 June 2023	
PK20	Maiyalap	มัยลาภ	MRT		21 November 2023	
A6	Makkasan	มักกะสัน	ARL		23 August 2010	MRT; SRT (planned) MRL (planned)
PK30	Min Buri	มีนบุรี	MRT		21 November 2023	MRT (under construction)
PK29	Min Buri Market	ตลาดมีนบุรี	MRT		21 November 2023	
PP12	Ministry of Public Health	กระทรวงสาธารณสุข	MRT		12 August 2016	
N8	Mo Chit	หมอชิต	BTS		5 December 1999	MRT : Chatuchak Park
PK10	Muang Thong Thani	เมืองทองธานี	MRT		21 November 2023	
E3	Nana	นานา	BTS		5 December 1999	
W1	National Stadium	สนามกีฬาแห่งชาติ	BTS		5 December 1999	
PK13	National Telecom	โทรคมนาคมแห่งชาติ	MRT		21 November 2023	
PP11	Nonthaburi Civic Center (Purple)	ศูนย์ราชการนนทบุรี	MRT		12 August 2016	MRT MRT (planned)
PK01	Nonthaburi Civic Center (Pink)	ศูนย์ราชการนนทบุรี	MRT		21 November 2023	MRT
PK26	Nopparat	นพรัตน์	MRT		21 November 2023	
E9	On Nut	อ่อนนุช	BTS		5 December 1999	
PK25	Outer Ring Road - Ram Inthra	วงแหวนรามอินทรา	MRT		21 November 2023	
PK07	Pak Kret Bypass	เลี่ยงเมืองปากเกร็ด	MRT		21 November 2023	
E19	Pak Nam	ปากน้ำ	BTS		6 December 2018	
BL14	Phahon Yothin	พหลโยธิน	MRT		3 July 2004	BTS : Ha Yaek Lat Phrao
N10	Phahon Yothin 24	พหลโยธิน 24	BTS		4 December 2019	
N18	Phahon Yothin 59	พหลโยธิน 59	BTS		16 December 2020	
BL36	Phasi Charoen	ภาษีเจริญ	MRT		21 September 2019	
YL2	Phawana	ภาวนา	MRT		12 June 2023	
N2	Phaya Thai (BTS Sukhumvit)	พญาไท	BTS		5 December 1999	ARL : Phaya Thai SRT (planned)
A8	Phaya Thai (ARL)	พญาไท	ARL		23 August 2010	BTS : Phaya Thai SRT (planned)
BL21	Phetchaburi	เพชรบุรี	MRT		3 July 2004	ARL : Makkasan SRT (planned); MRL (planned)
BL35	Phetkasem 48	เพชรเกษม 48	MRT		21 September 2019	
E2	Phloen Chit	เพลินจิต	BTS		5 December 1999	MRL (planned)
S9	Pho Nimit	โพธิ์นิมิตร	BTS		12 January 2013	
E8	Phra Khanong	พระโขนง	BTS		5 December 1999	MRL (planned)
PP08	Phra Nang Klao Bridge	สะพานพระนั่งเกล้า	MRT		12 August 2016	
BL20	Phra Ram 9	พระราม 9	MRT		3 July 2004	
E21	Phraek Sa	แพรกษา	BTS		6 December 2018	
E5	Phrom Phong	พร้อมพงษ์	BTS		5 December 1999	
E16	Pu Chao	ปู่เจ้า	BTS		6 December 2018	
E11	Punnawithi	ปุณณวิถี	BTS		12 August 2011	
BL23	Queen Sirikit National Convention Centre	ศูนย์การประชุมแห่งชาติสิริกิติ์	MRT		3 July 2004	MRL (planned)
PK15	Rajabhat Phranakhon	ราชภัฏพระนคร	MRT		21 November 2023	
PK17	Ram Inthra 3	รามอินทรา 3	MRT		21 November 2023	
PK19	Ram Inthra Kor Mor 4	รามอินทรา ก.ม.4	MRT		21 November 2023	
PK22	Ram Inthra Kor Mor 6	รามอินทรา ก.ม.6	MRT		21 November 2023	
PK24	Ram Inthra Kor Mor 9	รามอินทรา ก.ม.9	MRT		21 November 2023	
A5	Ramkhamhaeng	รามคำแหง	ARL		23 August 2010	SRT (planned)
RN10	Rangsit	รังสิต	SRT		2 August 2021	
S1	Ratchadamri	ราชดำริ	BTS		5 December 1999	
BL16	Ratchadaphisek	รัชดาภิเษก	MRT		3 July 2004	
A7	Ratchaprarop	ราชปรารภ	ARL		23 August 2010	SRT (planned)
N1	Ratchathewi	ราชเทวี	BTS		5 December 1999	MRT (under construction)
N11	Ratchayothin	รัชโยธิน	BTS		4 December 2019	
N14	Royal Forest Department	กรมป่าไม้	BTS		5 June 2020	
PK05	Royal Irrigation Department	กรมชลประทาน	MRT		21 November 2023	
N22	Royal Thai Air Force Museum	พิพิธภัณฑ์กองทัพอากาศ	BTS		16 December 2020	
E18	Royal Thai Naval Academy	โรงเรียนนายเรือ	BTS		6 December 2018	
E22	Sai Luat	สายลวด	BTS		6 December 2018	
PP07	Sai Ma	ไทรม้า	MRT		12 August 2016	
N19	Sai Yud	สายหยุด	BTS		16 December 2020	
S4	Saint Louis	เซนต์หลุยส์	BTS		8 February 2021	
S2	Sala Daeng	ศาลาแดง	BTS		5 December 1999	MRT : Si Lom
PP03	Sam Yaek Bang Yai	สามแยกบางใหญ่	MRT		12 August 2016	
BL27	Sam Yan	สามย่าน	MRT		3 July 2004	
BL30	Sam Yot	สามยอด	MRT		29 July 2019	MRT (under construction)
PK04	Samakkhi	สามัคคี	MRT		21 November 2023	
E15	Samrong (BTS Sukhumvit)	สำโรง	BTS		3 April 2017	MRT
YL23	Samrong (Yellow)	สำโรง	MRT		3 June 2023	BTS
BL31	Sanam Chai	สนามไชย	MRT		29 July 2019	
N4	Sanam Pao	สนามเป้า	BTS		5 December 1999	
PK03	Sanambin Nam	สนามบินน้ำ	MRT		21 November 2023	
N7	Saphan Khwai	สะพานควาย	BTS		5 December 1999	
N20	Saphan Mai	สะพานใหม่	BTS		16 December 2020	
S6	Saphan Taksin	สะพานตากสิน	BTS		5 December 1999	
N12	Sena Nikhom	เสนานิคม	BTS		4 December 2019	
PK28	Setthabutbamphen	เศรษฐบุตรบำเพ็ญ	MRT		21 November 2023	
YL19	Si Bearing	ศรีแบริ่ง	MRT		3 June 2023	
YL20	Si Dan	ศรีด่าน	MRT		3 June 2023	
YL17	Si Iam	ศรีเอี่ยม	MRT		3 June 2023	BTS (planned)
YL10	Si Kritha	ศรีกรีฑา	MRT		12 June 2023	
YL18	Si La Salle	ศรีลาซาล	MRT		3 June 2023	
BL26	Si Lom	สีลม	MRT		3 July 2004	BTS : Sala Daeng
YL13	Si Nut	ศรีนุช	MRT		3 June 2023	
PK09	Si Rat	ศรีรัช	MRT		21 November 2023	
YL21	Si Thepha	ศรีเทพา	MRT		3 June 2023	
YL16	Si Udom	ศรีอุดม	MRT		3 June 2023	
CEN	Siam	สยาม	BTS; BTS		5 December 1999	
BL06	Sirindhorn	สิรินธร	MRT		4 December 2019	
YL14	Srinagarindra 38	ศรีนครินทร์ 38	MRT		3 June 2023	
E20	Srinagarindra	ศรีนครินทร์	BTS		6 December 2018	
YL15	Suan Luang Rama IX	สวนหลวง ร.9	MRT		3 June 2023	
BL22	Sukhumvit	สุขุมวิท	MRT		3 July 2004	BTS : Asok
S5	Surasak	สุรศักดิ์	BTS		5 December 1999	
BL17	Sutthisan	สุทธิสาร	MRT		3 July 2004	
A1	Suvarnabhumi	สุวรรณภูมิ	ARL		23 August 2010	
PP02	Talad Bang Yai	ตลาดบางใหญ่	MRT		12 August 2016	
S10	Talat Phlu	ตลาดพลู	BTS		14 February 2013	MRL (planned)
RW06	Taling Chan	ตลิ่งชัน	SRT		2 August 2021	
BL10	Tao Poon (Blue)	เตาปูน	MRT		11 August 2017	MRT
PP16	Tao Poon (Purple)	เตาปูน	MRT		6 August 2016	MRT
BL01	Tha Phra	ท่าพระ	MRT		29 July 2019	MRL (planned)
BL19	Thailand Cultural Centre	ศูนย์วัฒนธรรมแห่งประเทศไทย	MRT		3 July 2004	MRT (under construction)
YL22	Thipphawan	ทิพวัล	MRT		3 June 2023	
E6	Thong Lo	ทองหล่อ	BTS		5 December 1999	MRL (planned)
RN05	Thung Song Hong	ทุ่งสองห้อง	SRT		2 August 2021	
E12	Udom Suk	อุดมสุข	BTS		12 August 2011	BTS (planned)
PK21	Vacharaphol	วัชรพล	MRT		21 November 2023	
N3	Victory Monument	อนุสาวรีย์ชัยสมรภูมิ	BTS		5 December 1999	
BL29	Wat Mangkon	วัดมังกร	MRT		29 July 2019	
N17	Wat Phra Sri Mahathat (BTS Sukhumvit)	วัดพระศรีมหาธาตุ	BTS		5 June 2020	MRT
PK16	Wat Phra Sri Mahathat (Pink)	วัดพระศรีมหาธาตุ	MRT		21 November 2023	BTS
RN03	Wat Samian Nari	วัดเสมียนนารี	SRT		2 August 2021	
PP14	Wong Sawang	วงศ์สว่าง	MRT		12 August 2016	
S8	Wongwian Yai	วงเวียนใหญ่	BTS		15 May 2009	MRT (under construction); SRT (planned)
S11	Wutthakat	วุฒากาศ	BTS		5 December 2013	
N23	Yaek Kor Por Aor	แยก คปอ.	BTS		16 December 2020	
YL9	Yaek Lam Sali	แยกลำสาลี	MRT		12 June 2023	MRT (under construction)
PP09	Yaek Nonthaburi 1	แยกนนทบุรี 1	MRT		12 August 2016	
PK06	Yaek Pak Kret	แยกปากเกร็ด	MRT		21 November 2023	
PP13	Yaek Tiwanon	แยกติวานนท์	MRT		12 August 2016	

== See also ==
- Airport Rail Link (Bangkok)
- Bangkok BRT
- BTS Skytrain
- Gold Line
- Mass Rapid Transit (Bangkok)
- Sukhumvit Line
- Silom Line
- MRT Brown Line
- MRT Grey Line
- MRT Light Blue Line
- MRT Orange Line
- MRT Pink Line
- MRT Purple Line
- MRT Yellow Line
- SRT Red Lines
