= Lat Phrao 71 MRT station =

Monorail station in Bangkok, Thailand

Lat Phrao 71 ลาดพร้าว 71
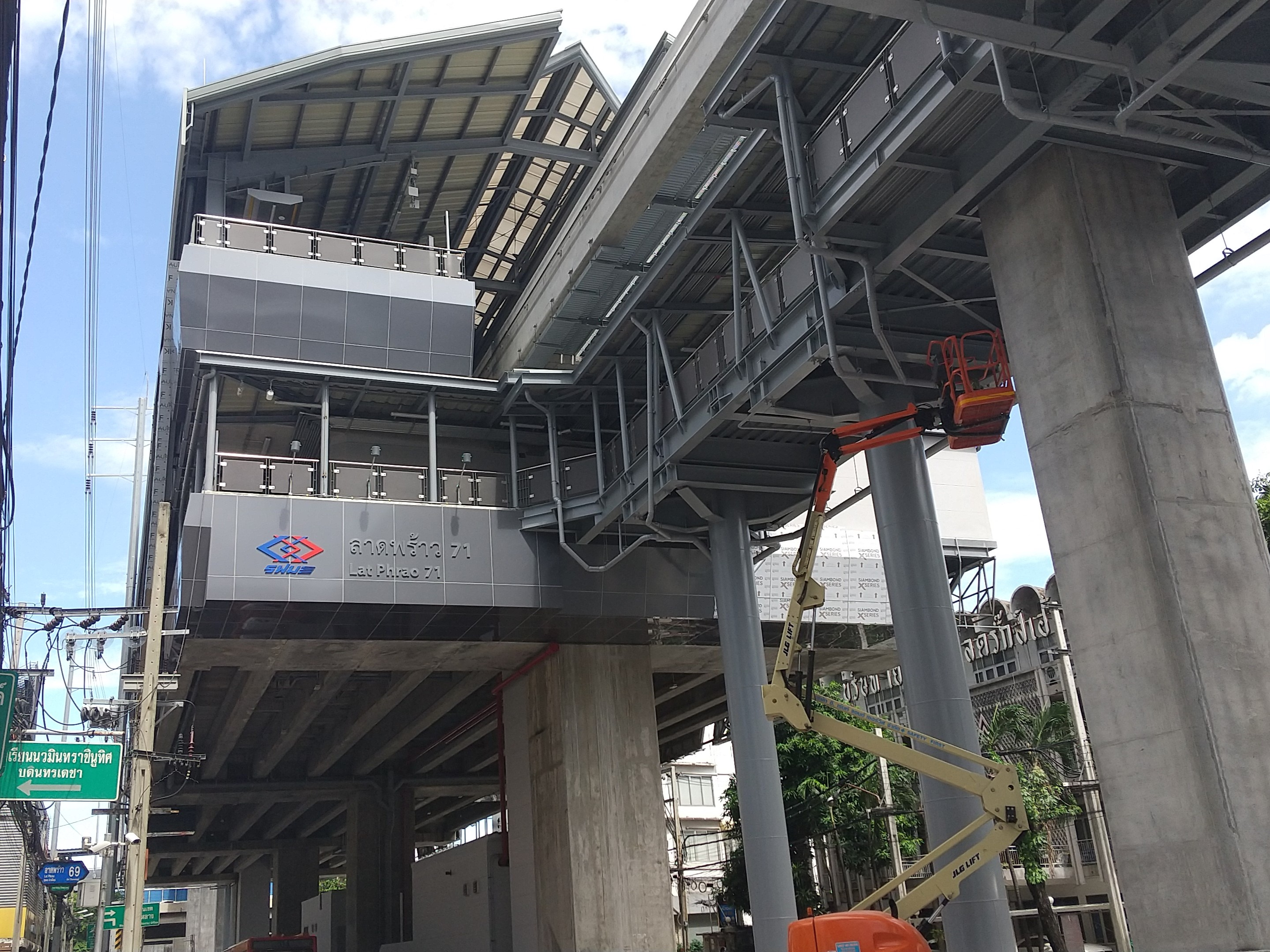

General information
- Location: Wang Thonglang District, Bangkok, Thailand
- Coordinates: 13.7872°N 100.6074°E
- System: MRT
- Owner: Mass Rapid Transit Authority of Thailand (MRTA)
- Operator: Eastern Bangkok Monorail Company Limited (EBM)
- Line: Yellow Line

Other information
- Station code: YL4

History
- Opened: 12 June 2023; 3 years ago

Services
Preceding station	Metropolitan Rapid Transit	Following station
Chok Chai 4 towards Lat Phrao	Yellow Line	Lat Phrao 83 towards Samrong
Location

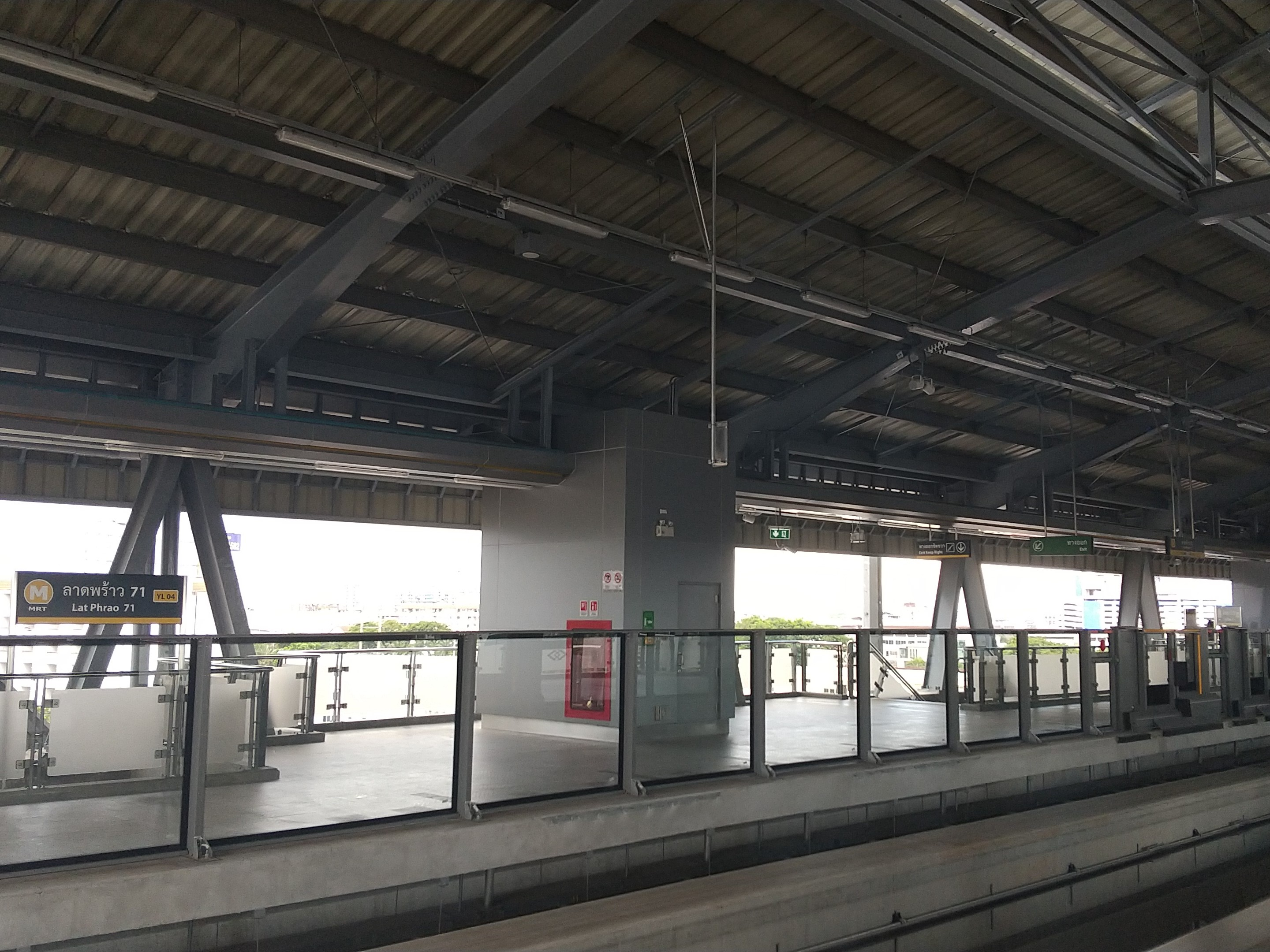
Platforms

Lat Phrao 71 station (Thai: สถานีลาดพร้าว 71) is a Bangkok MRT station on the Yellow Line. The station is located on Lat Phrao Road, near Soi Lat Phrao 71 in Wang Thonglang District, Bangkok. The station has four entrances. It opened on 12 June 2023 as part of trial operations on the line between Hua Mak and Phawana.

== Station layout ==
U3	Side platform, doors will open on the left
U3	Platform 1	Yellow towards Samrong (Lat Phrao 83)
U3	Platform 2	Yellow towards Lat Phrao (Chok Chai 4)
U3	Side platform, doors will open on the left
U2	Concourse	Exit 1-4, Ticket machines
G	-	Bus stop, Lat Phrao Road
