= Lat Phrao 101 MRT station =

Train station in Thailand

Lat Phrao 101 ลาดพร้าว 101
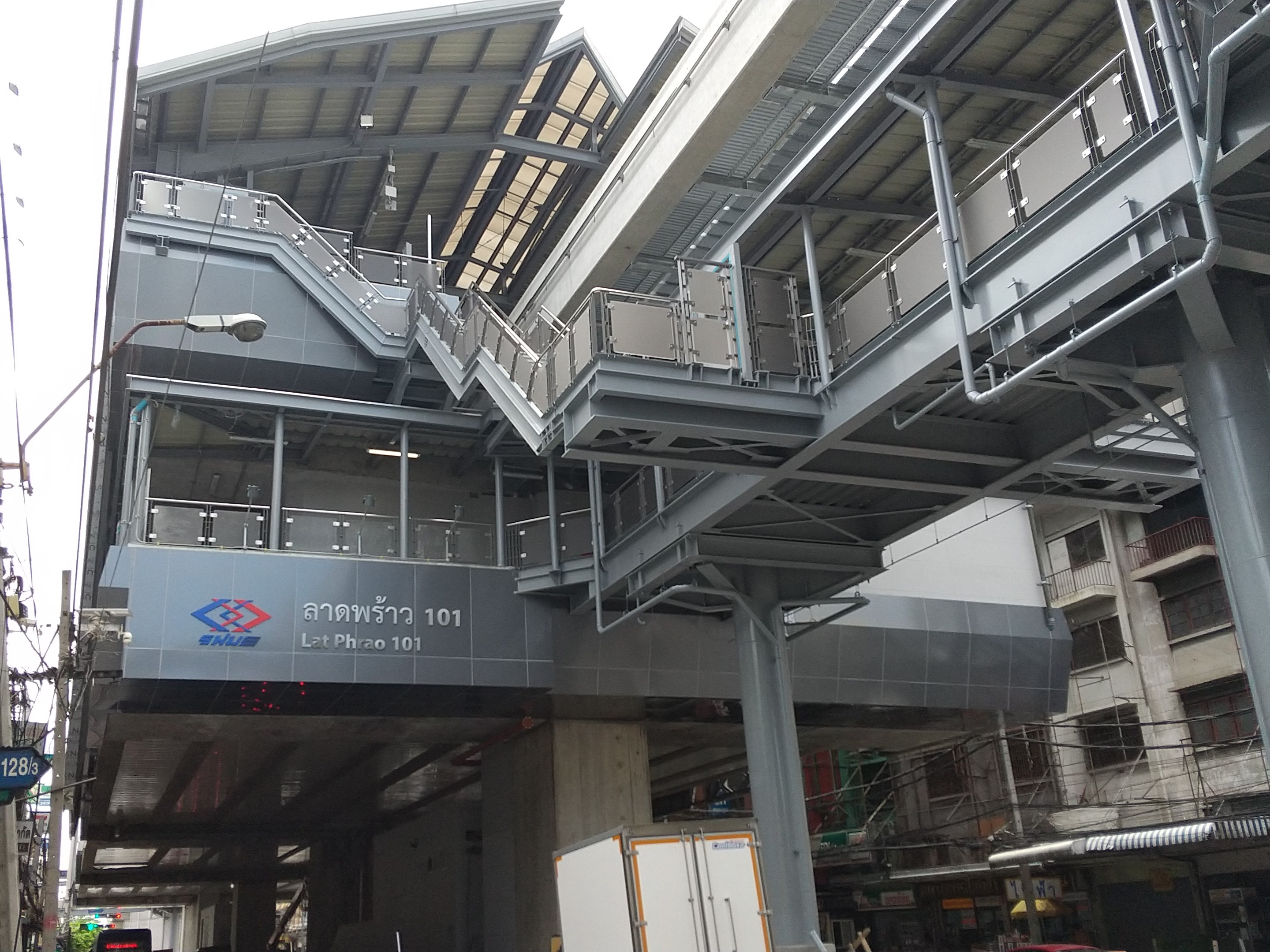

General information
- Location: Bang Kapi District, Bangkok, Thailand
- Coordinates: 13.7747°N 100.6298°E
- System: MRT
- Owner: Mass Rapid Transit Authority of Thailand (MRTA)
- Operator: Eastern Bangkok Monorail Company Limited (EBM)
- Line: Yellow Line

Other information
- Station code: YL7

History
- Opened: 12 June 2023; 3 years ago

Services
Preceding station	Metropolitan Rapid Transit	Following station
Mahat Thai towards Lat Phrao	Yellow Line	Bang Kapi towards Samrong
Location

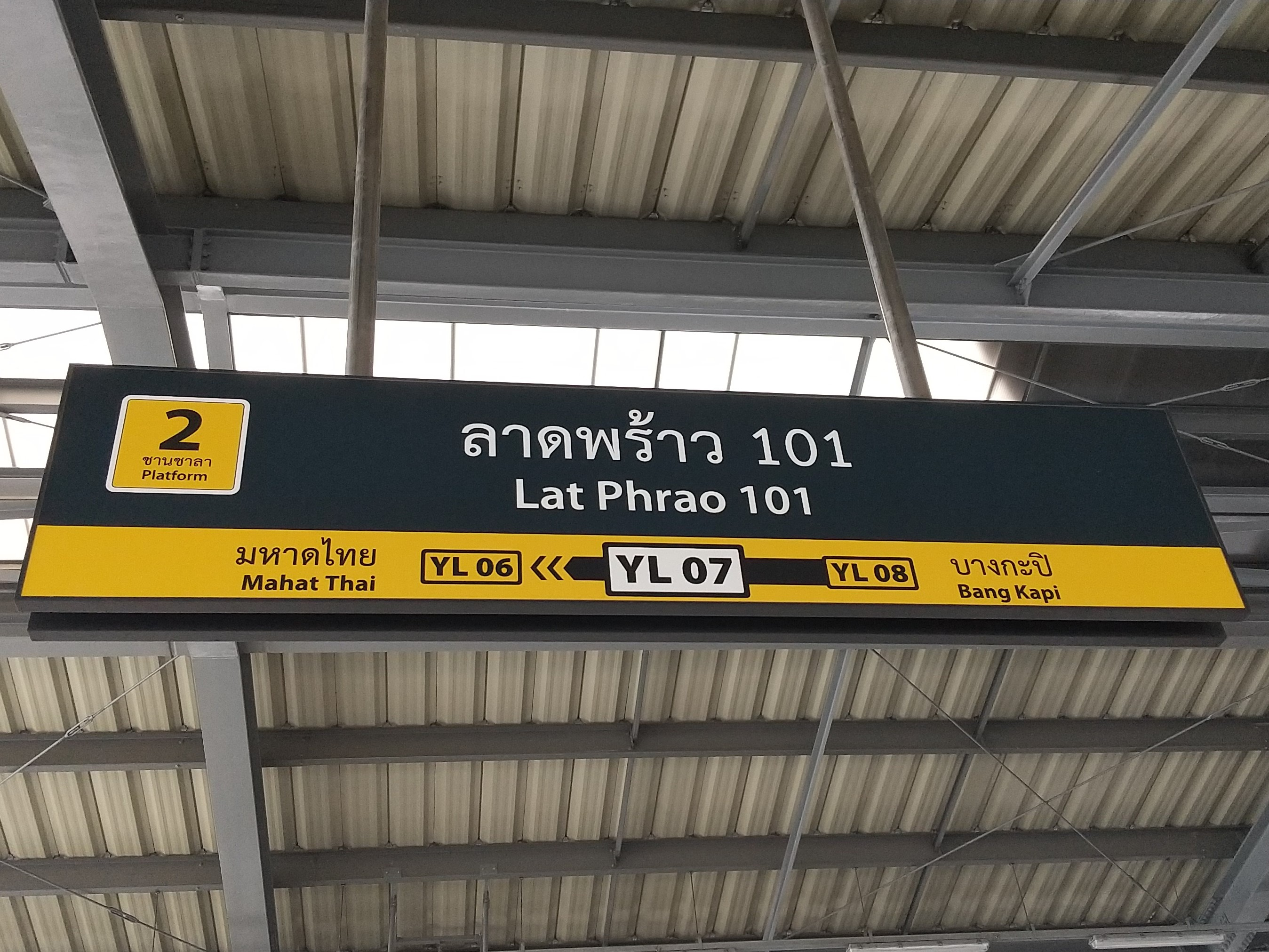
Signage

Lat Phrao 101 station (Thai: สถานีลาดพร้าว 101) is a Bangkok MRT station on the Yellow Line. The station is located on Lat Phrao Road, near Soi Lat Phrao 101 in Bang Kapi District, Bangkok. The station has four entrances. It opened on 12 June 2023 as part of trial operations on the line between Hua Mak and Phawana.

== Station layout ==
U3	Side platform, doors will open on the left
U3	Platform 1	Yellow towards Samrong (Bang Kapi)
U3	Platform 2	Yellow towards Lat Phrao (Mahat Thai)
U3	Side platform, doors will open on the left
U2	Concourse	Exit 1-4, Ticket machines
G	-	Bus stop, Lat Phrao Road
