= Mahat Thai MRT station =

Monorail station in Bangkok, Thailand

Mahat Thai มหาดไทย
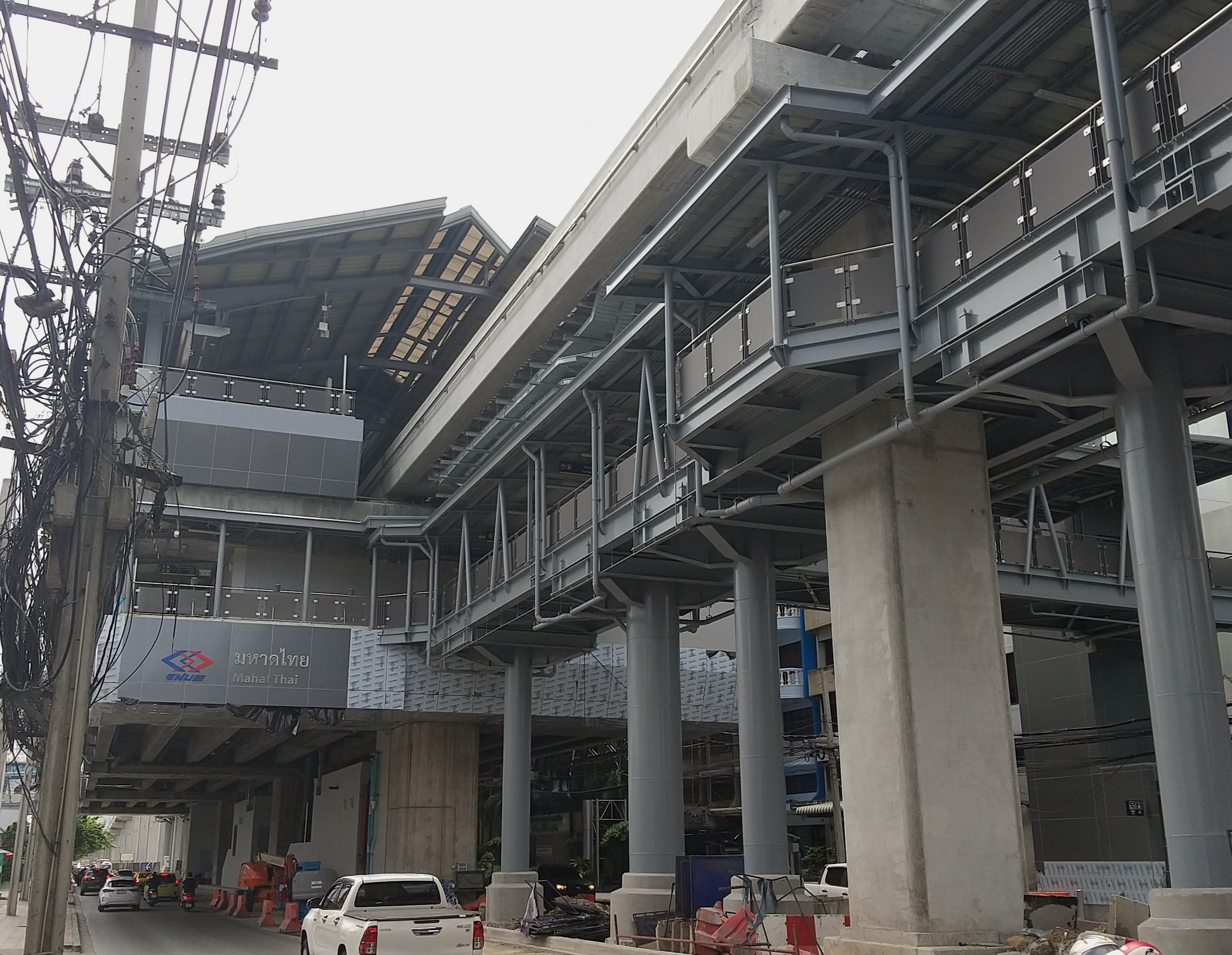

General information
- Location: Wang Thonglang District, Bangkok, Thailand
- Coordinates: 13.7784°N 100.6231°E
- System: MRT
- Owner: Mass Rapid Transit Authority of Thailand (MRTA)
- Operator: Eastern Bangkok Monorail Company Limited (EBM)
- Line: Yellow Line

Other information
- Station code: YL6

History
- Opened: 12 June 2023; 3 years ago

Services
Preceding station	Metropolitan Rapid Transit	Following station
Lat Phrao 83 towards Lat Phrao	Yellow Line	Lat Phrao 101 towards Samrong
Location

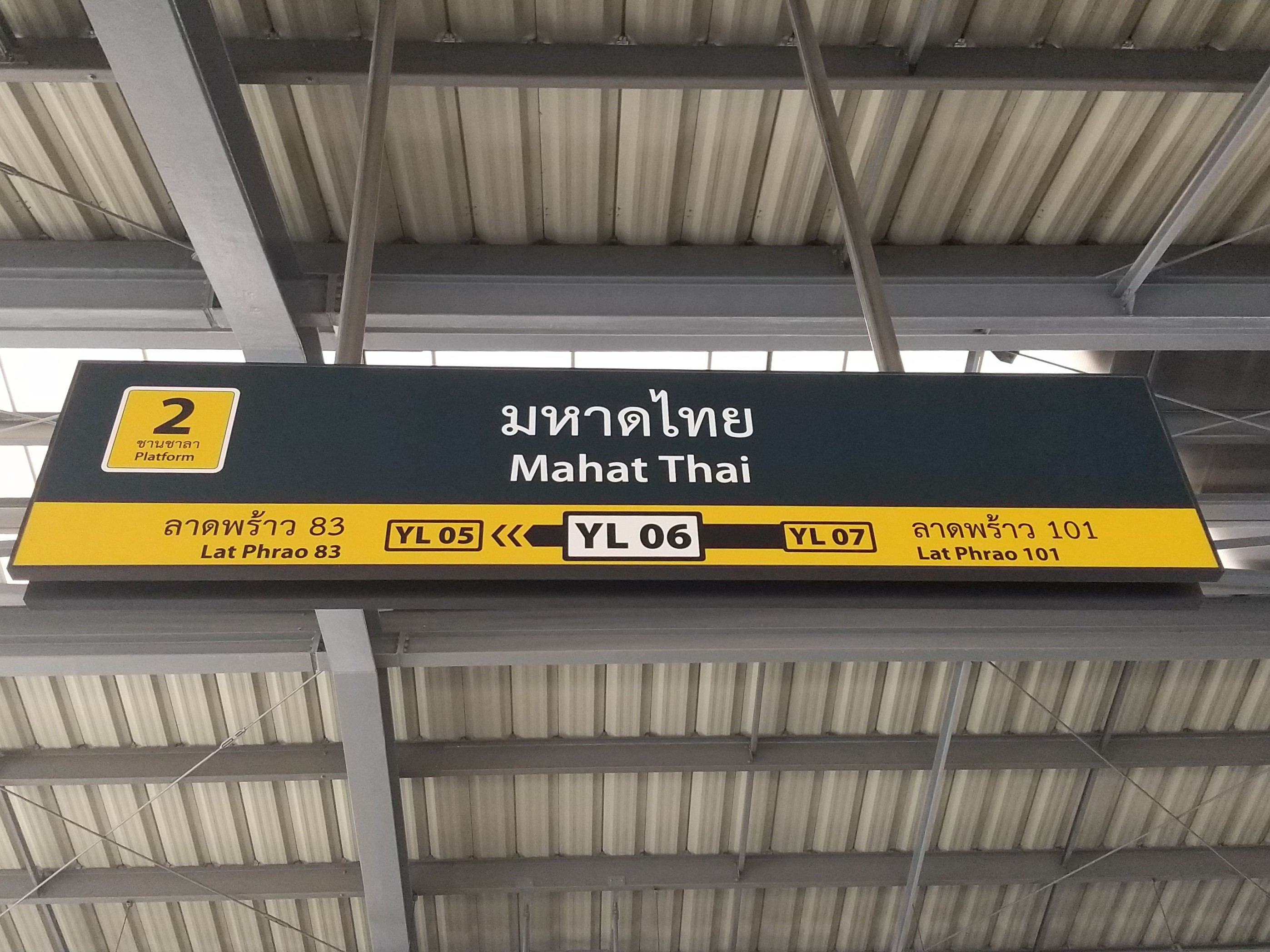
Signage

Mahat Thai station (Thai: สถานีมหาดไทย) is a Bangkok MRT station on the Yellow Line. The station is located on Lat Phrao Road, near Soi Lat Phrao 120 in Wang Thonglang District, Bangkok. The station has four entrances. It opened on 12 June 2023 as part of trial operations on the line between Hua Mak and Phawana.

It's named after nearby Soi Lat Phrao 122, also known as Soi Mahat Thai, shortcut to Soi Ramkhamhaeng 65 on the side of Ramkhamhaeng Road opposite Rajamangala Stadium and Ramkhamhaeng University (RU) in Bang Kapi District.

== Station layout ==
U3	Side platform, doors will open on the left
U3	Platform 1	Yellow towards Samrong (Lat Phrao 101)
U3	Platform 2	Yellow towards Lat Phrao (Lat Phrao 83)
U3	Side platform, doors will open on the left
U2	Concourse	Exit 1-5, Ticket machines
G	-	Bus stop, Lat Phrao Road, Food Land Lat Phrao
