= Si Kritha MRT station =

Monorail station in Bangkok, Thailand

Si Kritha ศรีกรีฑา
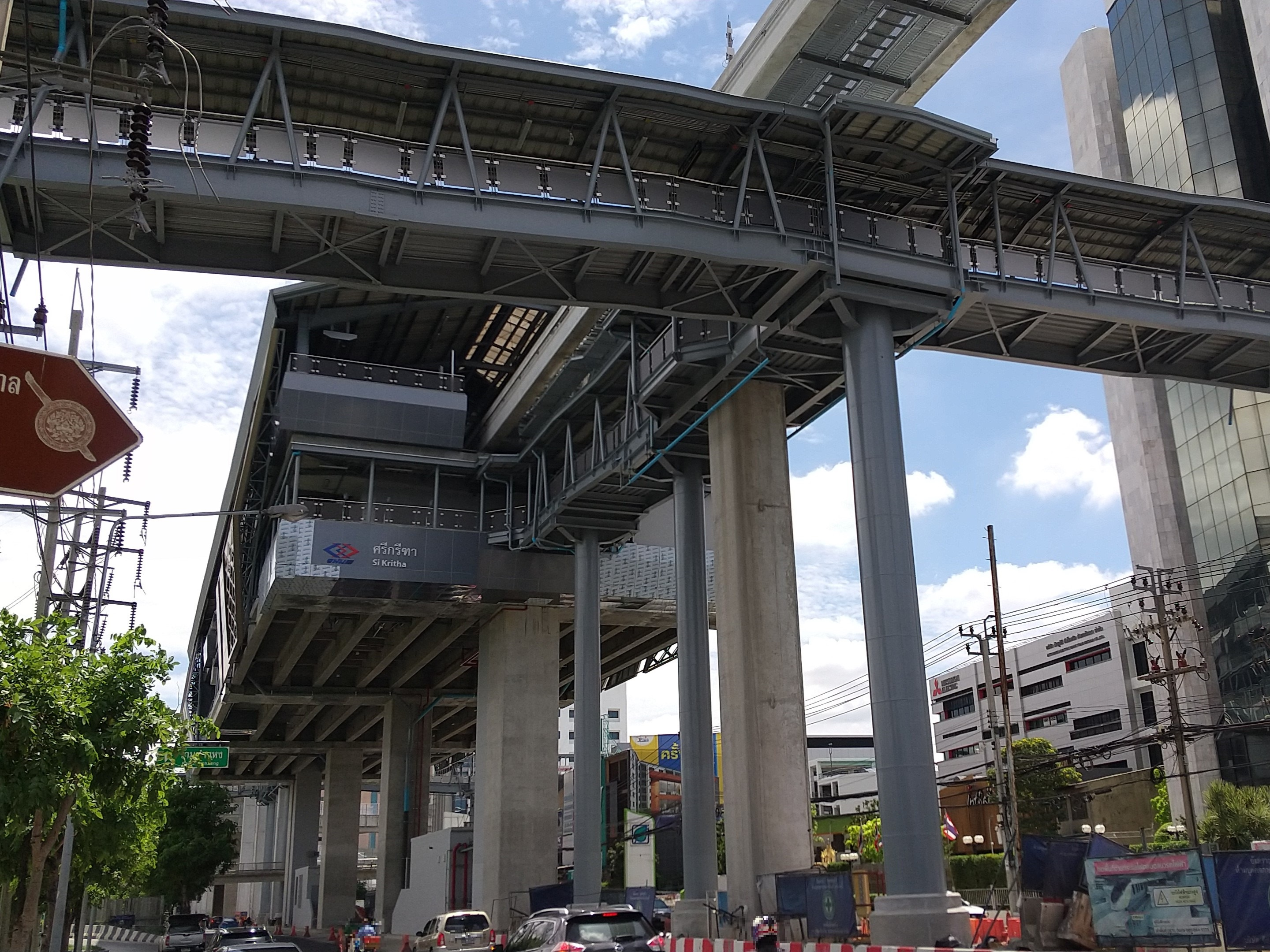

General information
- Location: Bang Kapi District, Bangkok, Thailand
- Coordinates: 13.7503°N 100.6447°E
- System: MRT
- Owner: Mass Rapid Transit Authority of Thailand (MRTA)
- Operator: Eastern Bangkok Monorail Company Limited (EBM)
- Line: Yellow Line

Other information
- Station code: YL10

History
- Opened: 12 June 2023; 3 years ago

Services
Preceding station	Metropolitan Rapid Transit	Following station
Yaek Lam Sali towards Lat Phrao	Yellow Line	Hua Mak towards Samrong
Location

Si Kritha station (Thai: สถานีศรีกรีฑา) is a Bangkok MRT station on the Yellow Line. The station is located on Srinagarindra Road in Bang Kapi District, Bangkok and is a portmanteau of the name of Srinagarindra and Krungthep Kritha roads, of which intersect adjacent to the station. The station has four entrances. It opened on 12 June 2023 as part of trial operations on the line between Hua Mak and Phawana.

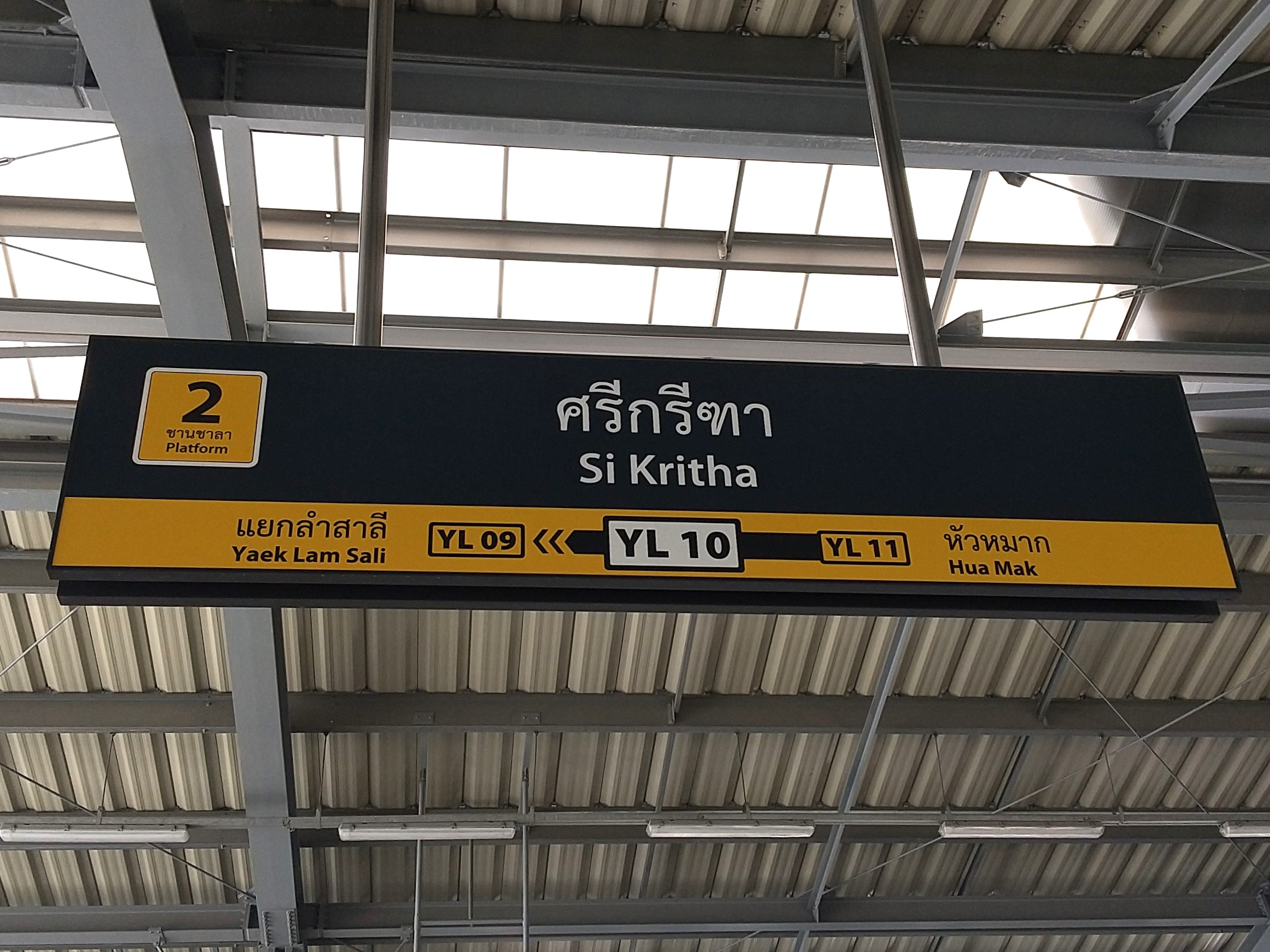
Signage

== Station layout ==
U3	Side platform, doors will open on the left
U3	Platform 1	Yellow towards Samrong (Hua Mak)
U3	Platform 2	Yellow towards Lat Phrao (Yaek Lam Sali)
U3	Side platform, doors will open on the left
U2	Concourse	Exit 1-4, Ticket machines
G	-	Bus stop, Lam Sali intersection
