= Bang Kapi MRT station =

Monorail station in Bangkok, Thailand

Bang Kapi บางกะปิ
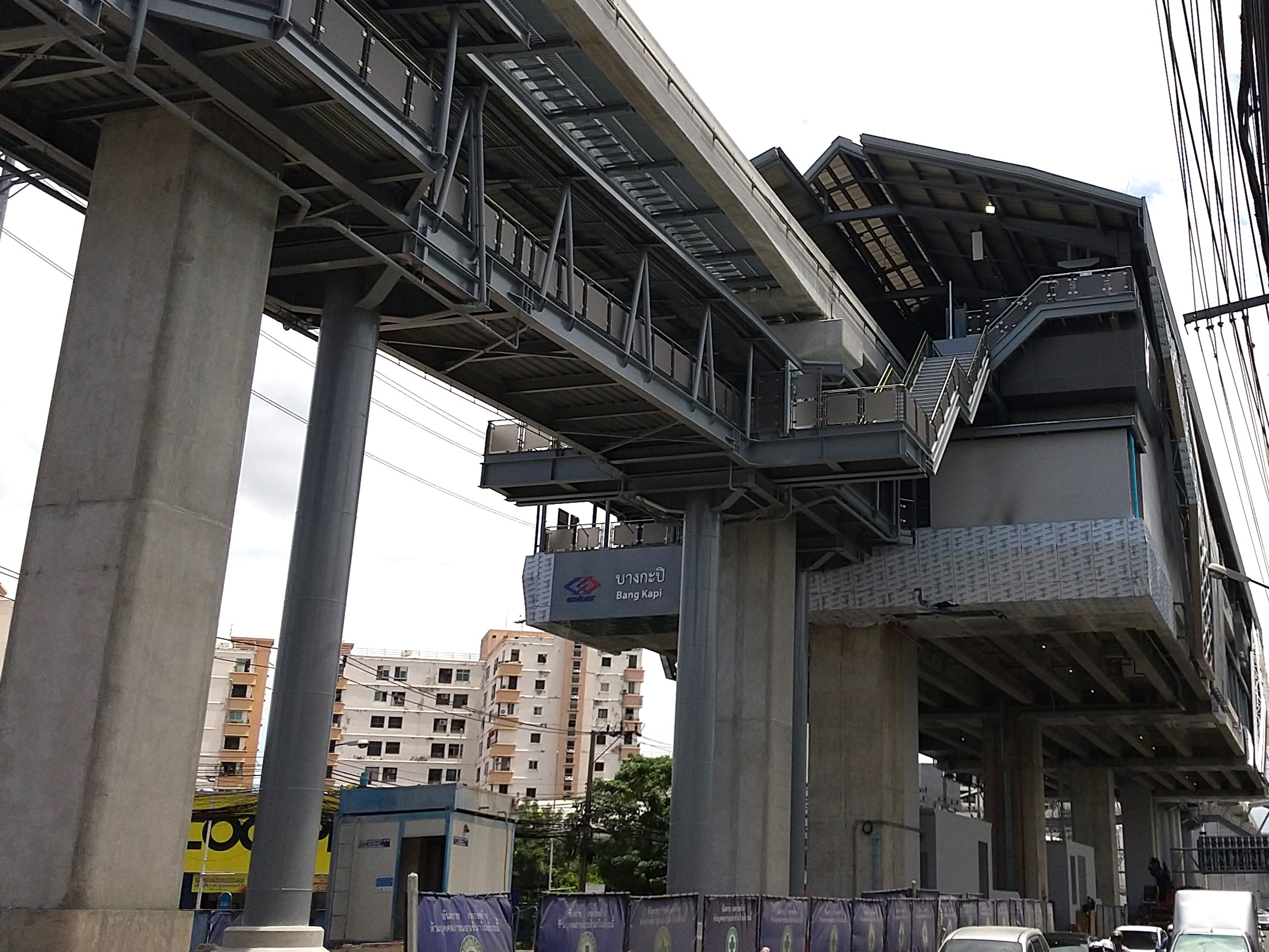

General information
- Location: Bang Kapi District, Bangkok, Thailand
- Coordinates: 13.7692°N 100.6396°E
- System: MRT
- Owner: Mass Rapid Transit Authority of Thailand (MRTA)
- Operator: Eastern Bangkok Monorail Company Limited (EBM)
- Line: Yellow Line

Other information
- Station code: YL8

History
- Opened: 12 June 2023; 3 years ago

Services
Preceding station	Metropolitan Rapid Transit	Following station
Lat Phrao 101 towards Lat Phrao	Yellow Line	Yaek Lam Sali towards Samrong
Location

Bang Kapi station (Thai: สถานีบางกะปิ) is a Bangkok MRT station on the Yellow Line. The station is located on Lat Phrao Road in Bang Kapi District, Bangkok. The station has four entrances and is located near The Mall Bangkapi shopping centre. It opened on 12 June 2023 as part of trial operations on the line between Hua Mak and Phawana.

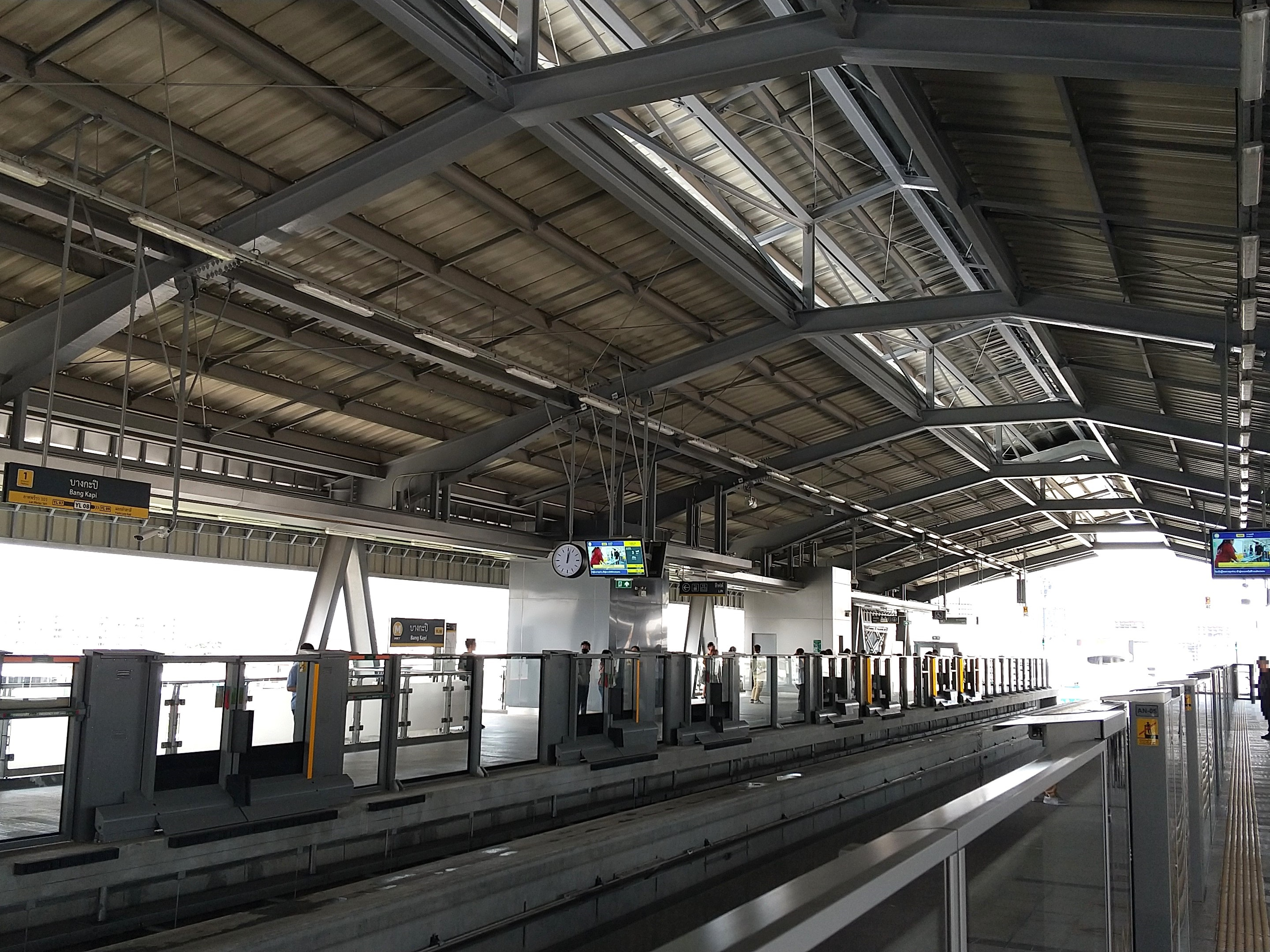
Platforms

== Station layout ==
U3	Side platform, doors will open on the left
U3	Platform 1	Yellow towards Samrong (Yaek Lam Sali)
U3	Platform 2	Yellow towards Lat Phrao (Lat Phrao 101)
U3	Side platform, doors will open on the left
U2	Concourse	Exit 1-4, Ticket machines
G	-	Bus stop, Lat Phrao Road
