= Chok Chai 4 MRT station =

Monorail station in Bangkok, Thailand

Chok Chai 4 โชคชัย 4
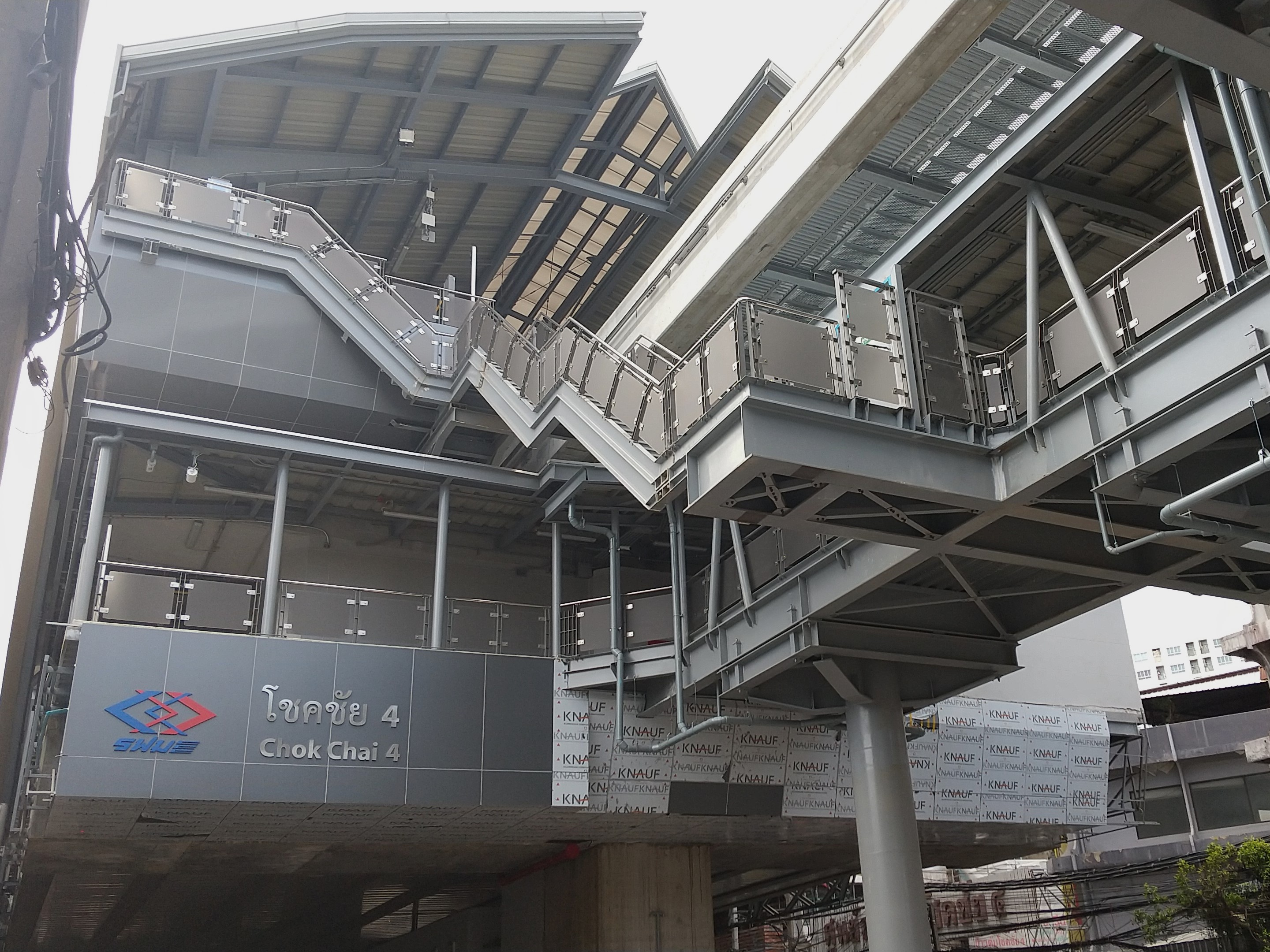

General information
- Location: Wang Thonglang District, Bangkok, Thailand
- Coordinates: 13.7945°N 100.5943°E
- System: MRT
- Owner: Mass Rapid Transit Authority of Thailand (MRTA)
- Operator: Eastern Bangkok Monorail Company Limited (EBM)
- Line: Yellow Line

Other information
- Station code: YL3

History
- Opened: 12 June 2023; 3 years ago

Services
Preceding station	Metropolitan Rapid Transit	Following station
Phawana towards Lat Phrao	Yellow Line	Lat Phrao 71 towards Samrong
Location

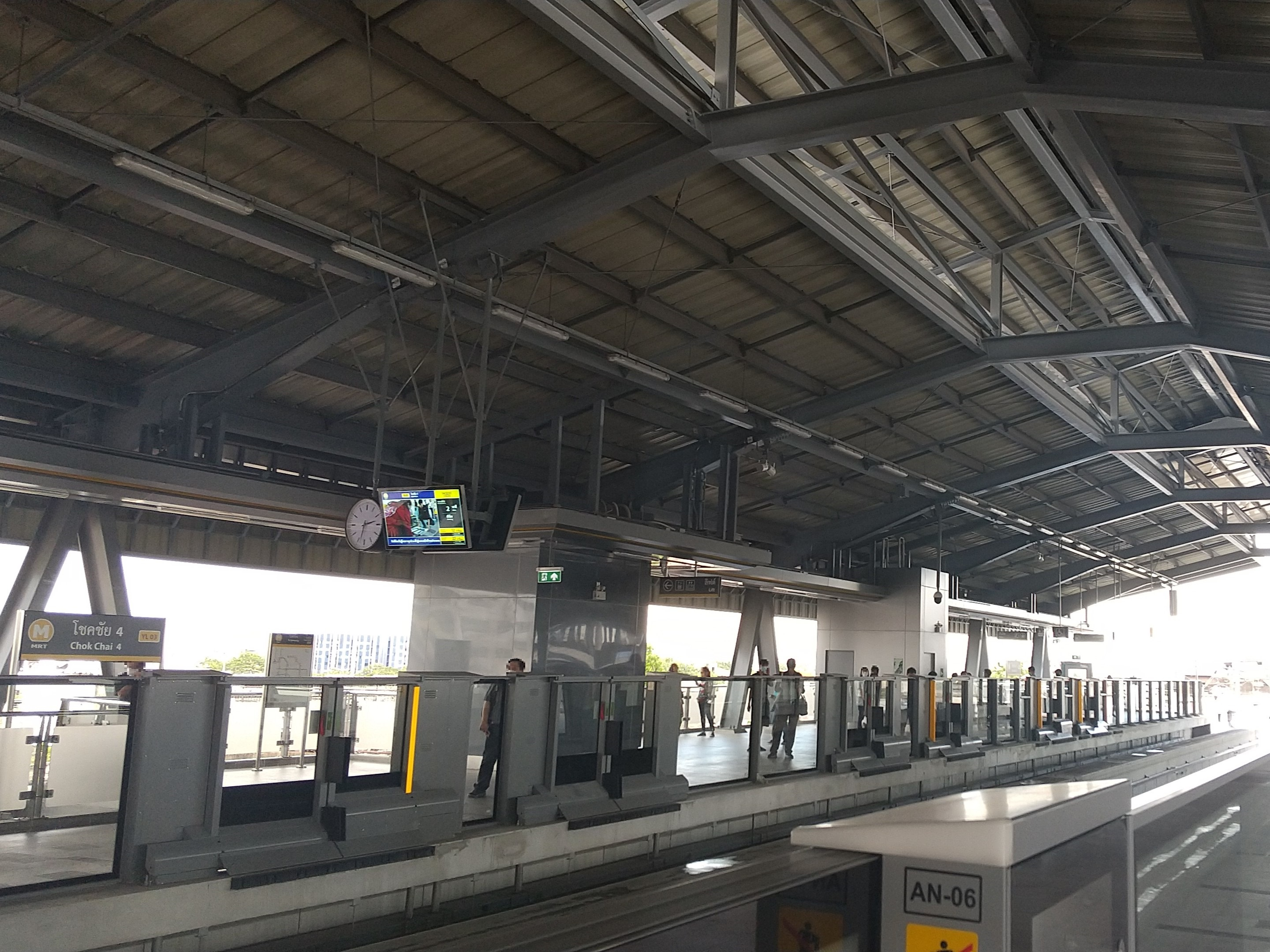
Platforms

Chok Chai 4 station (Thai: สถานีโชคชัย 4) is a Bangkok MRT station on the Yellow Line. The station is located on Lat Phrao Road, near its intersection with Chok Chai 4 road in Wang Thonglang District, Bangkok. The station has four entrances. It opened on 12 June 2023 as part of trial operations on the line between Hua Mak and Phawana.

== Station layout ==
U3	Side platform, doors will open on the left
U3	Platform 1	Yellow towards Samrong (Lat Phrao 71)
U3	Platform 2	Yellow towards Lat Phrao (Phawana)
U3	Side platform, doors will open on the left
U2	Concourse	Exit 1-5, Ticket machines
G	-	Bus stop, Lat Phrao Road
