= Yaek Lam Sali MRT station =

Monorail station in Bangkok, Thailand

Yaek Lam Sali แยกลำสาลี
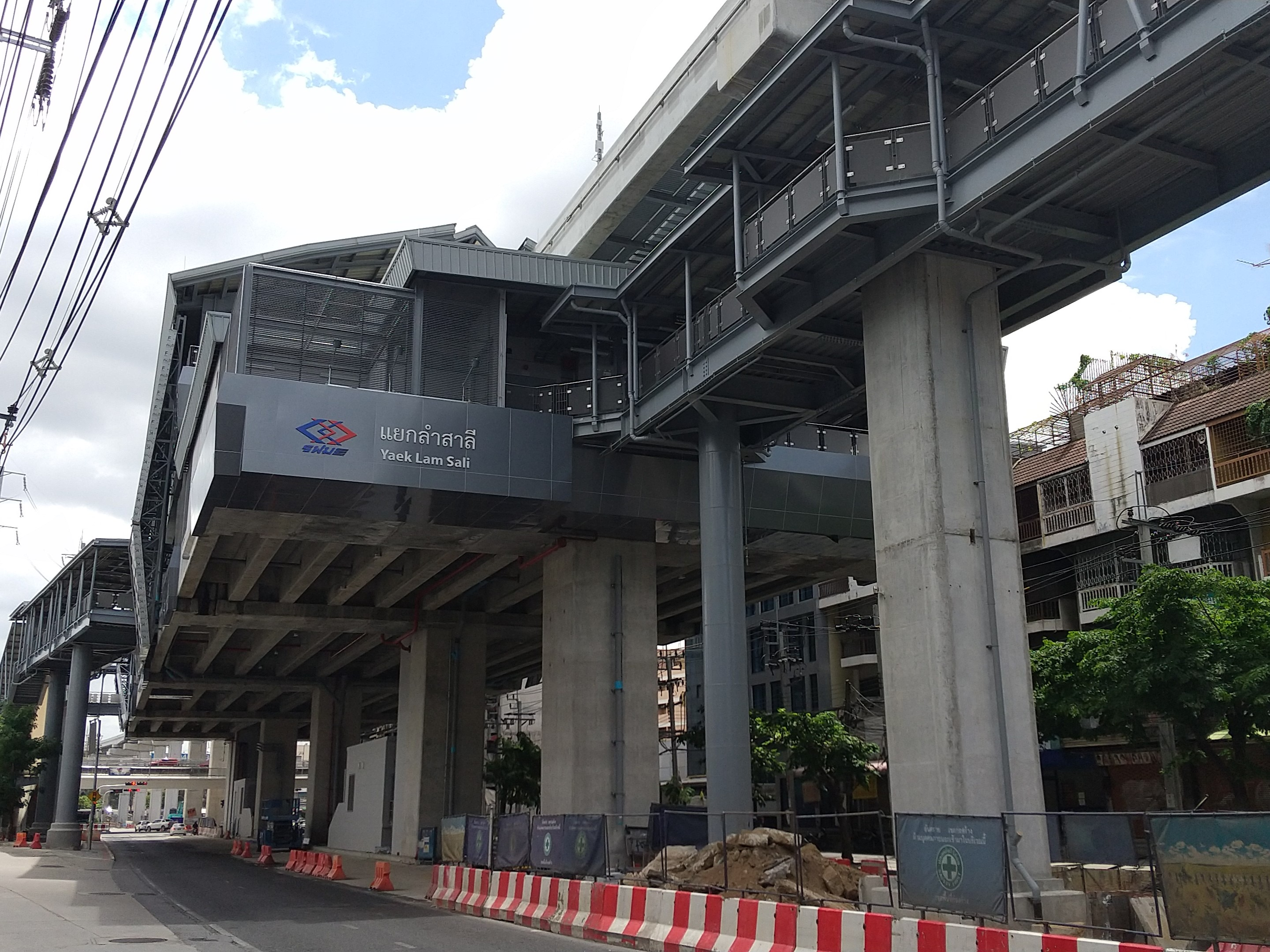

General information
- Location: Bang Kapi District, Bangkok, Thailand
- Coordinates: 13.7617°N 100.6455°E
- System: MRT MRT
- Owner: Mass Rapid Transit Authority of Thailand (MRTA)
- Operator: Eastern Bangkok Monorail Company Limited (EBM)
- Line: Yellow Line

Other information
- Station code: YL9; OR20

History
- Opened: 12 June 2023; 3 years ago

Services
Preceding station	Metropolitan Rapid Transit	Following station
Bang Kapi towards Lat Phrao	Yellow Line	Si Kritha towards Samrong
Under construction
Ramkhamhaeng 34 towards Taling Chan	Orange Line	Si Burapha towards Yaek Rom Klao
Location

Yaek Lam Sali station (Thai: สถานีแยกลำสาลี) is a Bangkok MRT station on the Yellow Line. The station is located on Srinagarindra Road in Bang Kapi District, Bangkok and is named after Lam Sali Intersection where the Srinagarindra and Ramkhamhaeng roads intersect adjacent to the station. The station has four entrances. It opened on 12 June 2023 as part of trial operations on the line between Hua Mak and Phawana.

In the future, it will become an interchange station to the Orange Line, which is currently under construction, and the Brown Line which is under planning.

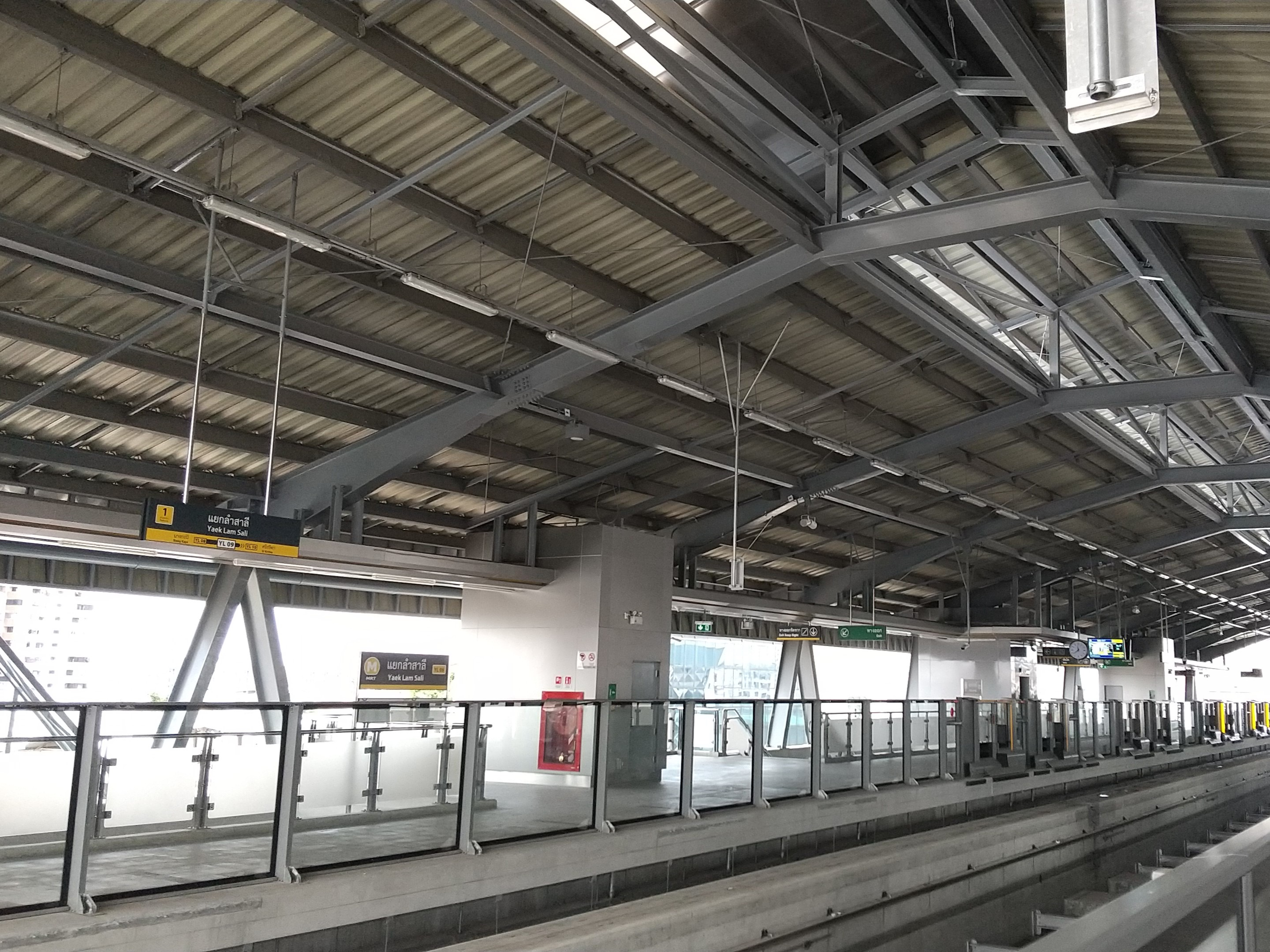
Platforms

The station also interchanges to piers in Khlong Saen Saep boat service.

== Station layout ==
U3	Side platform, doors will open on the left
U3	Platform 1	Yellow towards Samrong (Si Kritha)
U3	Platform 2	Yellow towards Lat Phrao (Bang Kapi)
U3	Side platform, doors will open on the left
U2	Concourse	Exit 1–4, Ticket machines
G	-	Bus stop, Lam Sali intersection
