= Samakkhi MRT station =

Metro station in Nonthaburi, Thailand

Samakkhi สามัคคี
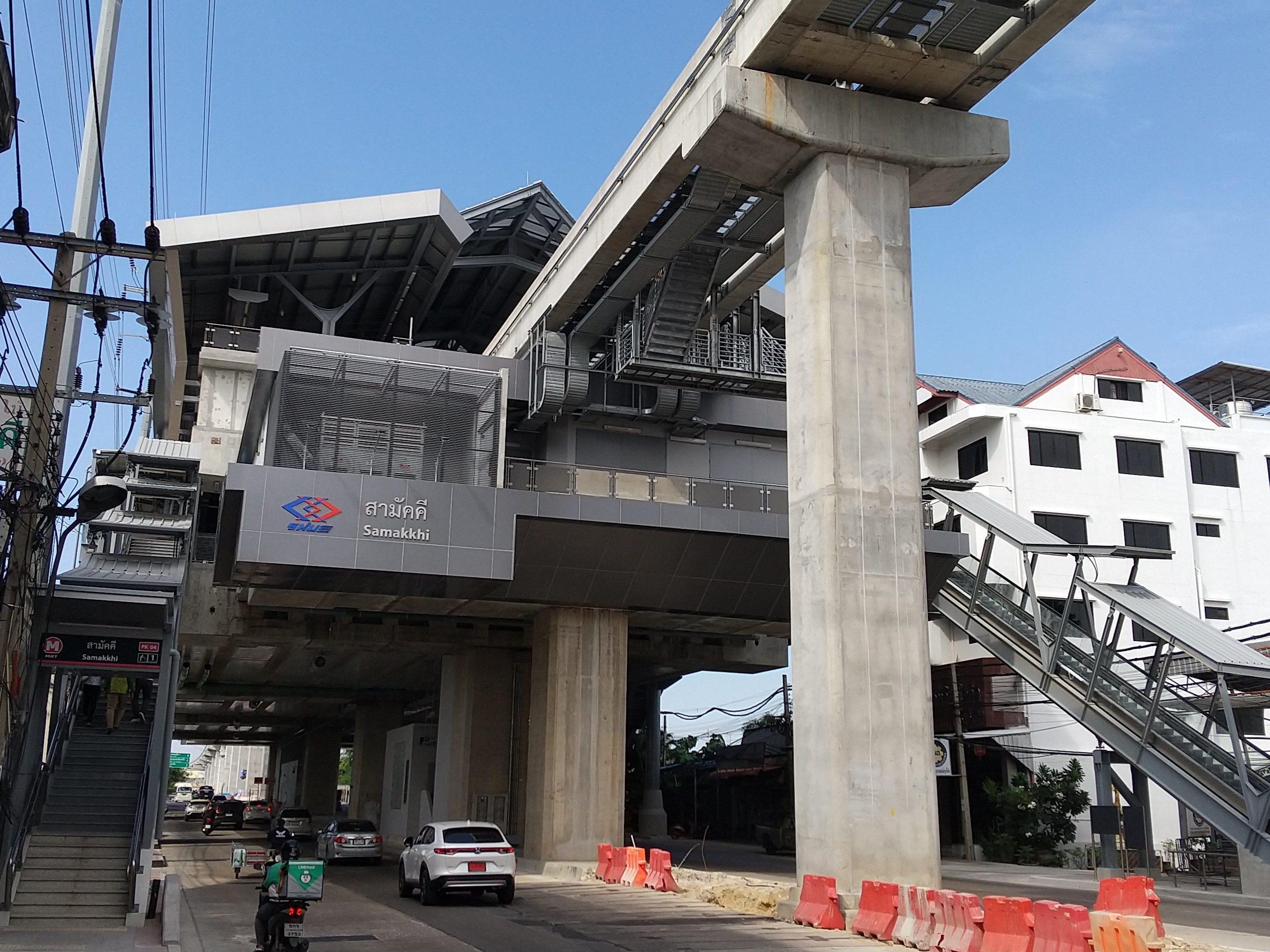

General information
- Location: Mueang Nonthaburi District, Nonthaburi province, Thailand
- Coordinates: 13.8894°N 100.5105°E
- System: MRT
- Owner: Mass Rapid Transit Authority of Thailand (MRTA)
- Operator: Northern Bangkok Monorail Company Limited
- Line: Pink Line

Other information
- Station code: PK04

History
- Opened: 21 November 2023

Services
Preceding station	Metropolitan Rapid Transit	Following station
Sanambin Nam towards Nonthaburi Civic Center	Pink Line	Royal Irrigation Department towards Min Buri
Location

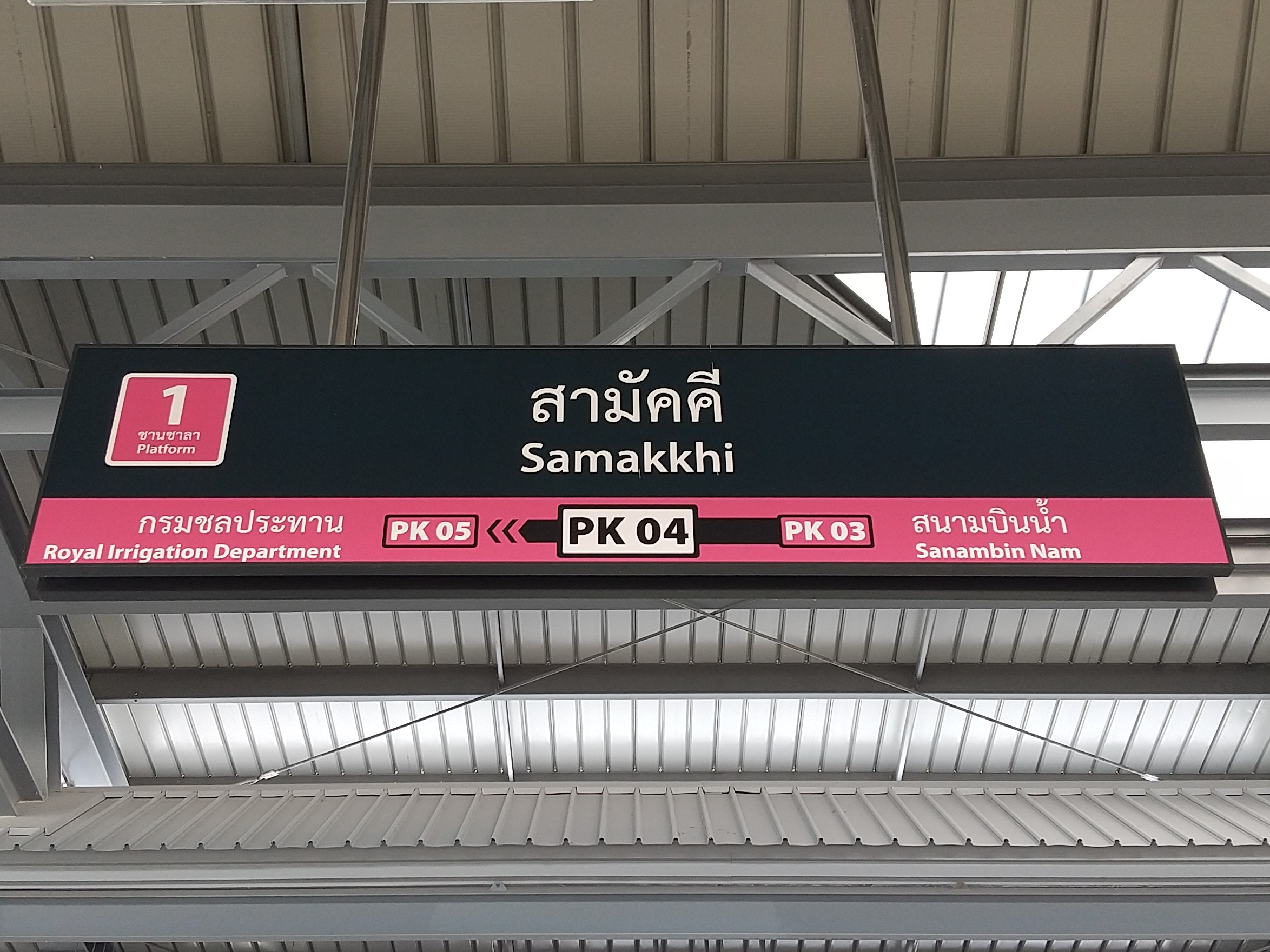
Signage

Samakkhi station (Thai: สถานีสามัคคี) is a Bangkok MRT station on the Pink Line. The station is located on Tiwanon Road at the junction between Tiwanon and Samakkhi roads in Mueang Nonthaburi district, Nonthaburi province. The station has four exits. It opened on 21 November 2023 as part of trial operations on the entire Pink Line.
