= Maiyalap MRT station =

Railway station in Bangkok, Thailand

Maiyalap มัยลาภ
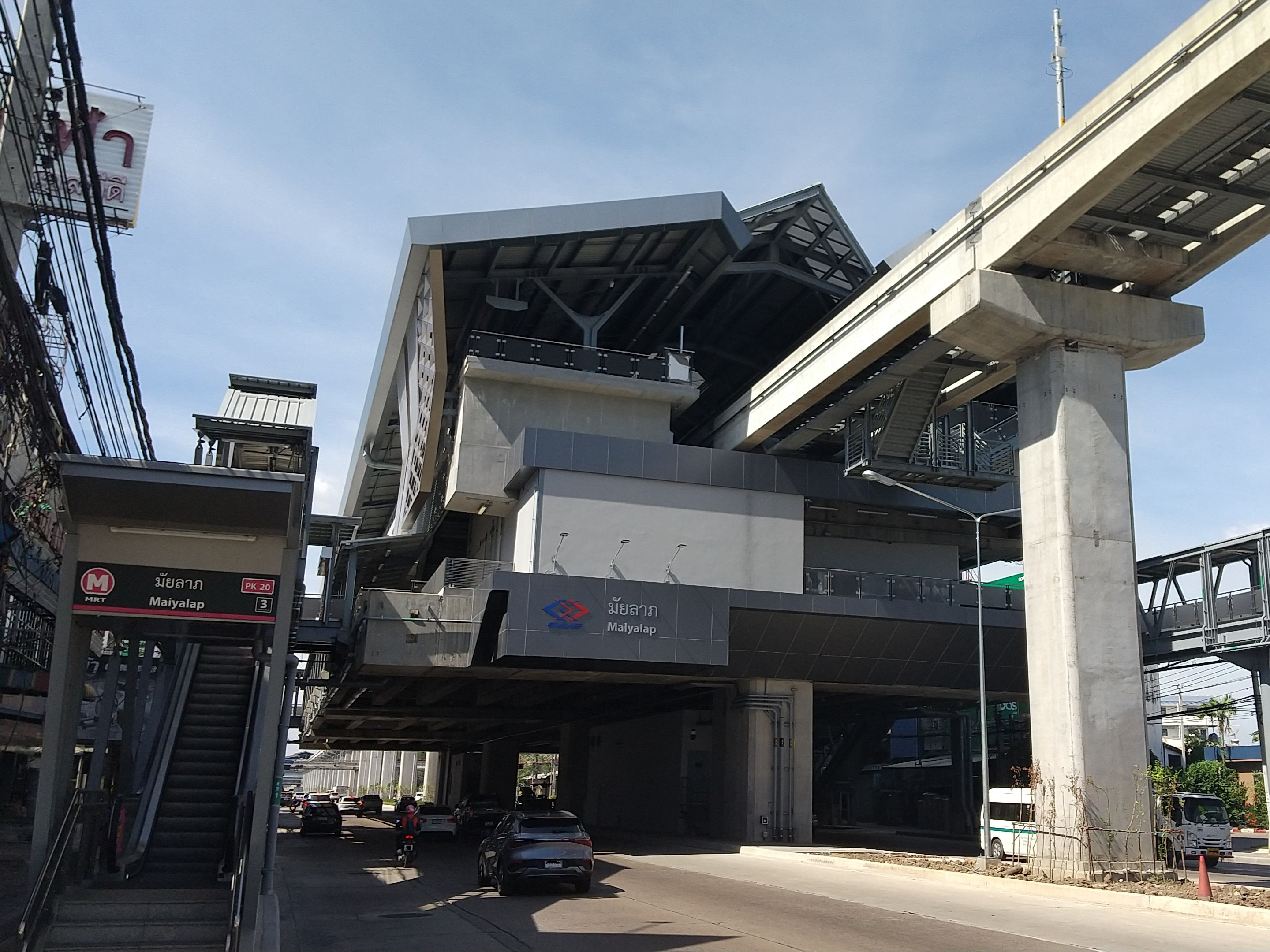

General information
- Location: Bang Khen District, Bangkok, Thailand
- System: MRT
- Owner: Mass Rapid Transit Authority of Thailand (MRTA)
- Operator: Northern Bangkok Monorail Company Limited
- Line: Pink Line

Other information
- Station code: PK20

History
- Opened: 21 November 2023

Services
Preceding station	Metropolitan Rapid Transit	Following station
Ram Inthra Kor Mor 4 towards Nonthaburi Civic Center	Pink Line	Vacharaphol towards Min Buri
Location

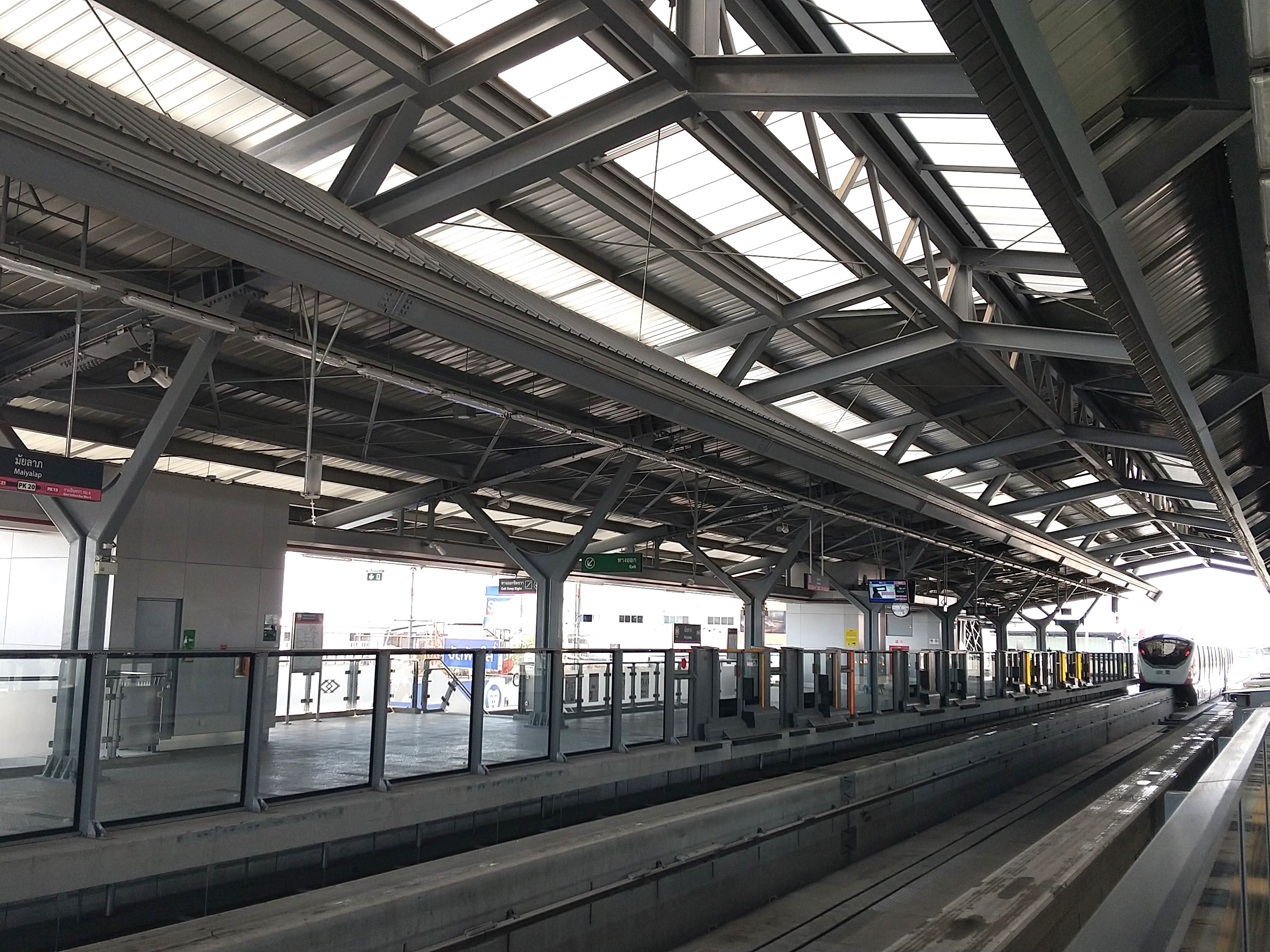
Platforms

Maiyalap station (Thai: สถานีมัยลาภ) is a Bangkok MRT station on the Pink Line. The station is located on Ram Inthra Road, near Soi Ram Inthra 14 (Soi Maiyalap) in Bang Khen district, Bangkok. The station has four exits. It opened on 21 November 2023 as part of trial operations on the entire Pink Line.
