= Phahon Yothin MRT station =

Railway station in Bangkok, Thailand

Coordinates: 13.8129°N 100.5620°E

พหลโยธิน Phahon Yothin
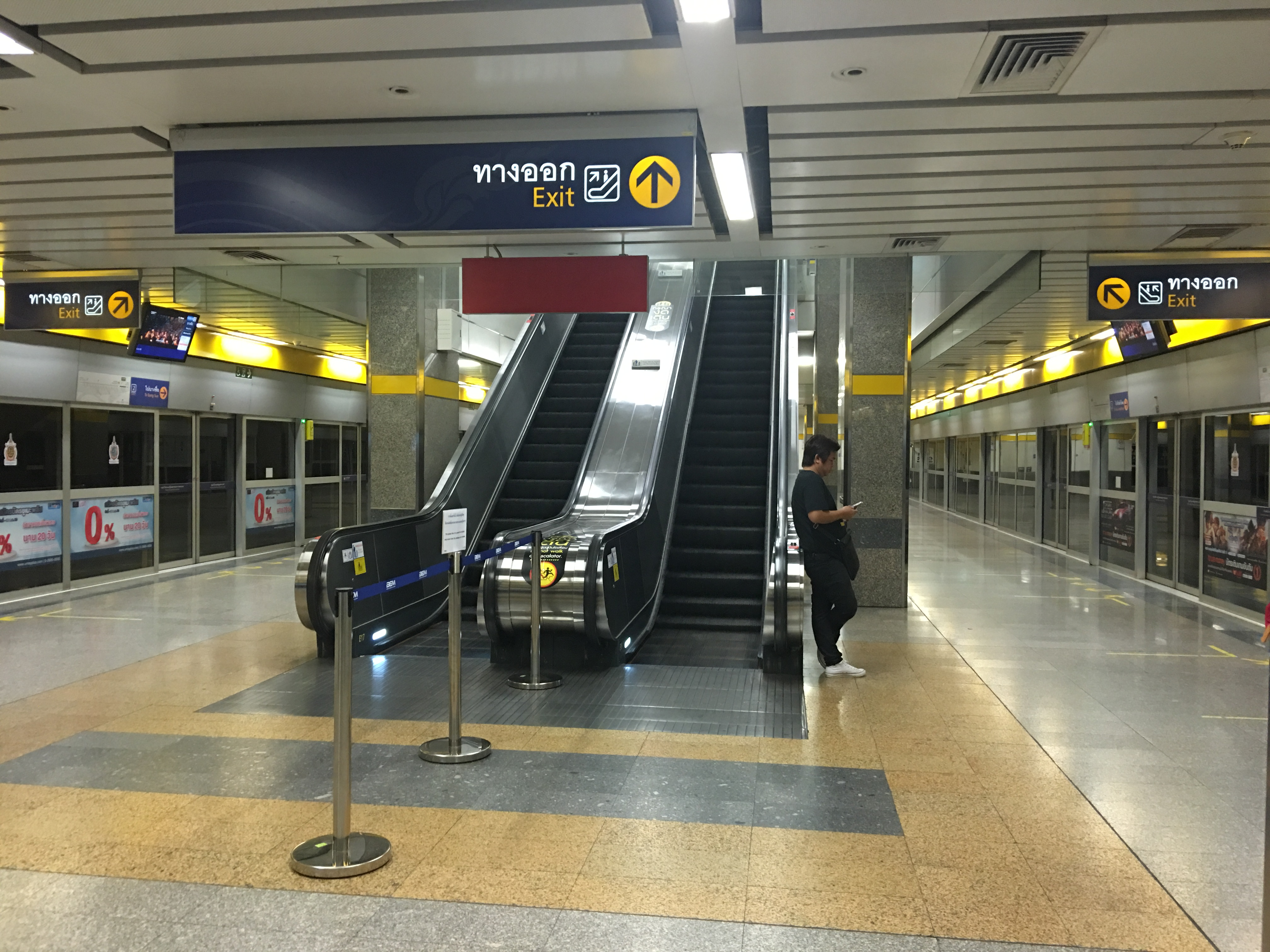

General information
- Location: Chatuchak, Bangkok, Thailand
- System: MRT
- Owner: Mass Rapid Transit Authority of Thailand (MRTA)
- Operator: Bangkok Expressway and Metro Public Company Limited (BEM)
- Line: MRT Blue Line
- Platforms: 1 island platform
- Tracks: 2
- Connections: Sukhumvit Line

Construction
- Structure type: Underground
- Accessible: yes

Other information
- Station code: BL14

History
- Opened: 3 July 2004; 22 years ago

Passengers
- 2021: 4,241,269

Services
Preceding station	Metropolitan Rapid Transit	Following station
Lat Phrao towards Lak Song	Blue Line	Chatuchak Park towards Tha Phra via Bang Sue
Preceding station	BTS Skytrain	Following station
Phahon Yothin 24 towards Khu Khot	Sukhumvit Line transfer at Ha Yaek Lat Phrao	Mo Chit towards Kheha
Location

Phahon Yothin station (Thai: สถานีพหลโยธิน, pronounced [sā.tʰǎː.nīː pʰā.hǒn jōː.tʰīn]) is a Bangkok MRT station on the Blue Line located under Lat Phrao Road and Phahon Yothin Road, which the station is named after, near Lat Phrao intersection. The station is important for people who live in Northern Bangkok such as the Don Mueang, Lak Si and Bang Khen districts. Its symbol color is yellow. The station is connected to the BTS Sukhumvit Line at Ha Yaek Lat Phrao BTS station via skywalk.

== Exit List ==
The station has five exits:

- Exit 1: Soi Lat Phrao 4, Digital Economy Promotion Agency
- Exit 2: Bangkok Employment Office 1, Saint John's University, Saint John Church, Ministry of Social Development and Human Security
- Exit 3: Horwang School, Central Ladprao, Somdet Ya Park, Railway Police Division 4
- Exit 4: Lat Phrao Intersection, Tesco Lotus Supercenter, Ha Yaek Lat Phrao BTS station via skywalk
- Exit 5: Soi Lat Phrao 1, Union Mall

== Station layout ==
G	-	Bus stop
B1	Basement	Exits 1–5, MetroMall
B2	Concourse	Ticket machines
B3	Platform 2	Blue towards Tha Phra via Bang Sue (Chatuchak Park)
B3	Island platform, doors will open on the right
B3	Platform 1	Blue towards Lak Song (Lat Phrao)
