= Central Ladprao =

Central Ladprao เซ็นทรัล ลาดพร้าว
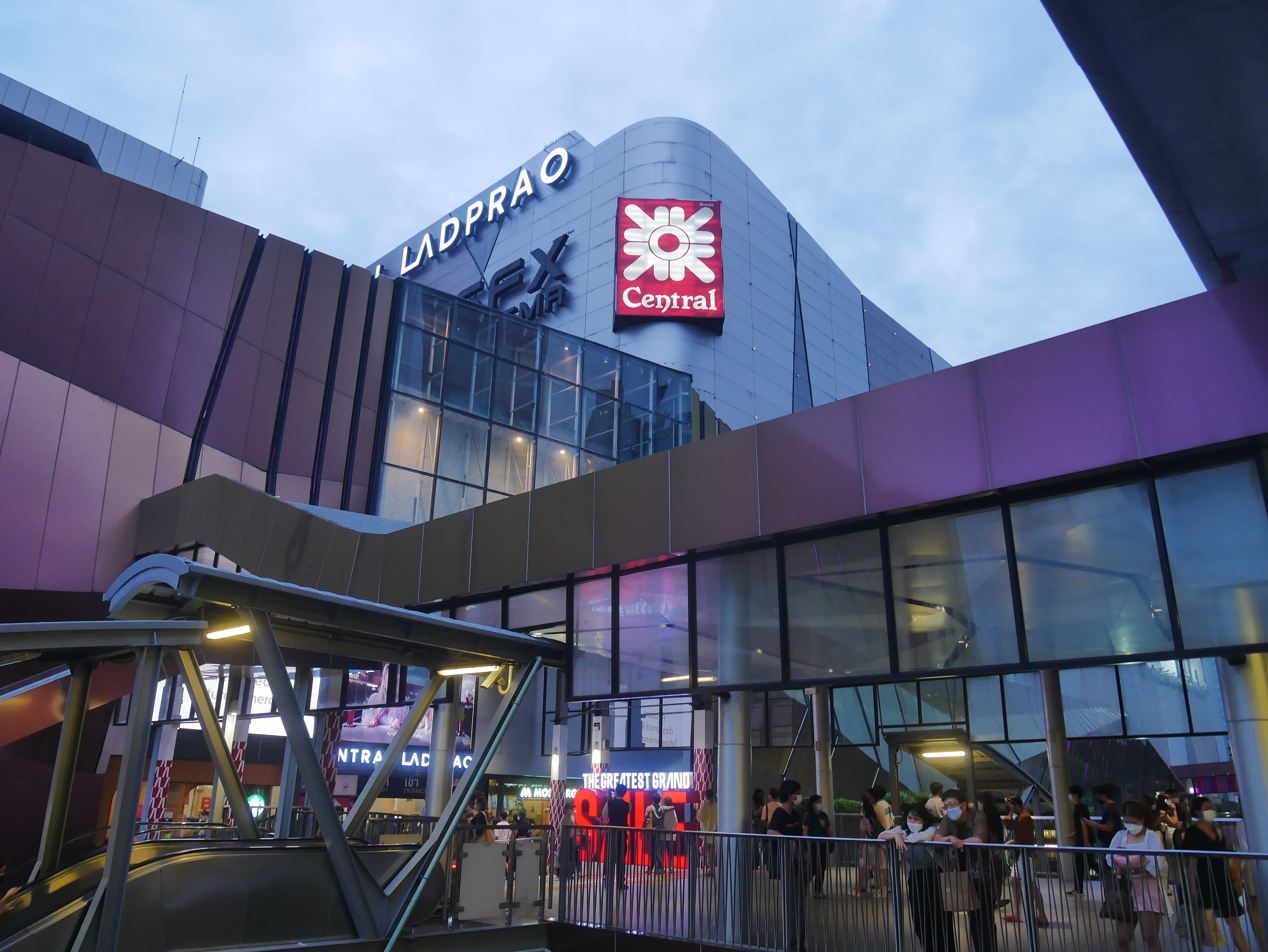
- Central Ladprao
- Location: 1693 Phahonyothin Road, Chatuchak, Bangkok, Thailand 10900
- Coordinates: 13.816944°N 100.56°E
- Opened: December 25, 1982
- Developer: Central Pattana
- Manager: Dounghathai Sirichartichai
- Owner: Central Pattana
- Num. of stores: 295
- Num. of anchor tenants: 3
- Floor area: 47,850 m^{2} (515,100 sq ft)
- Public transit: MRT Phahon Yothin; BTS Ha Yaek Lat Phrao
- Website: www.centralplaza.co.th/lardprao; www.central.co.th/en/store/central-ladprao

Other facts and statistics of Central Ladprao
- GFA of shopping mall: 78,700 m^{2} (847,000 sq ft) include: GLA of stores rental: 55,583 m^{2} (598,290 sq ft); GFA of convention center: 9,000 m^{2} (97,000 sq ft); GFA of offices tower: 17,719 m^{2} (190,730 sq ft); GFA of indoor parking structure and parking underground of shopping mall and offices tower: 33,000 m^{2} (360,000 sq ft); No. of floors in Central Plaza complex: Shopping mall (Central Department Store): 7; Shopping mall (Main plaza): 4; Shopping mall (Left wing plaza): 5; Offices tower: 14; Hotel tower : 25; Convention center (a part of 5-star hotel tower): 2; Parking of shopping mall and offices tower: 6

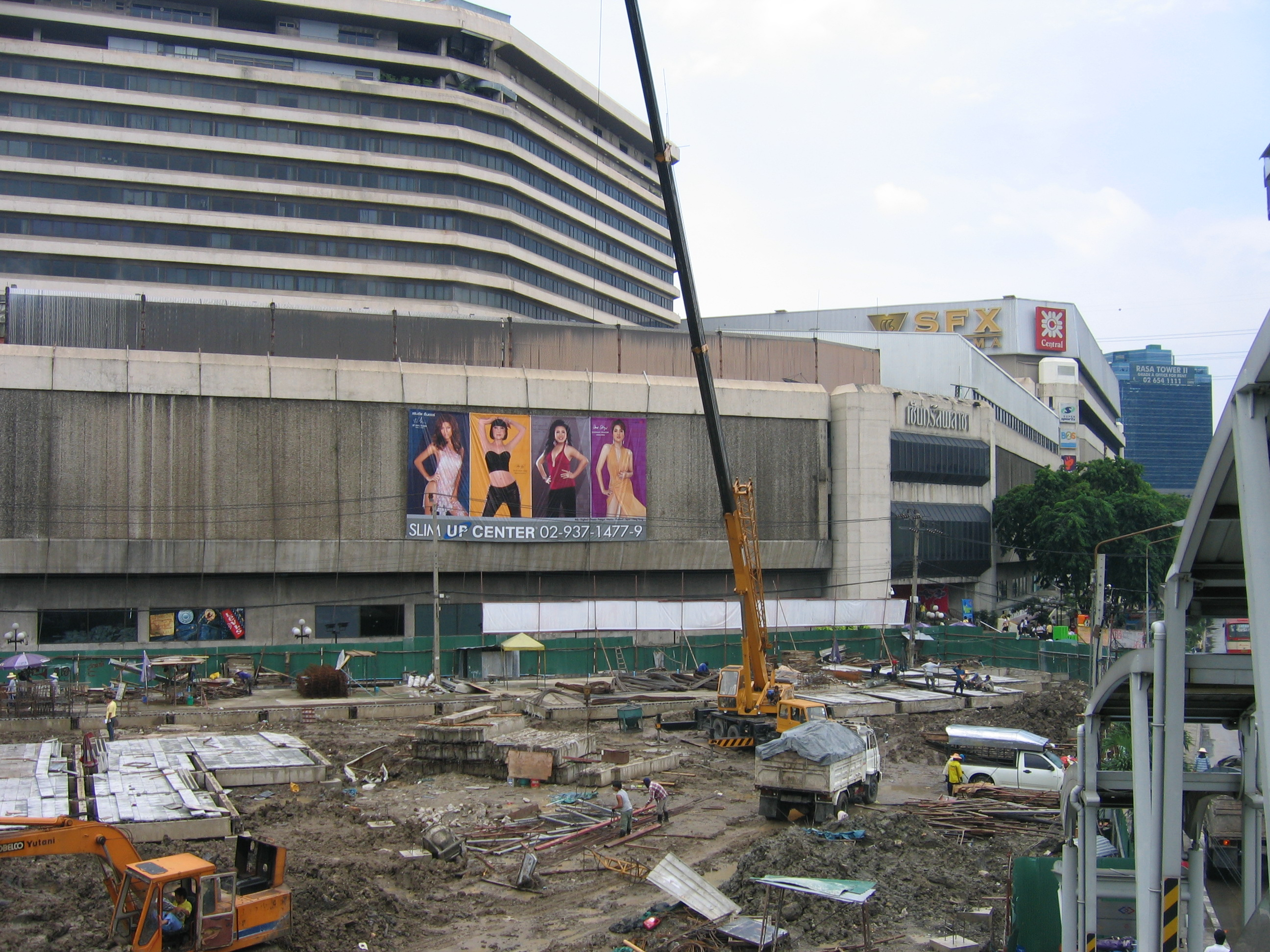
Works at CentralPlaza Lat Phrao in 2007

Central Ladprao (Thai: เซ็นทรัล ลาดพร้าว) (previously known as CentralPlaza Ladprao) is a shopping mall owned by Central Pattana. The complex opened on 25 December 1982, and was the first integrated shopping complex by Central Pattana. It is located on Phahon Yothin Road near Lat Phrao Intersection (An intersection where Phahon Yothin, Lat Phrao and VibhavadPhaholyothini Rangsit roads meet) in Chatuchak district, Bangkok. It is served by Ha Yaek Lat Phrao station on Sukhumvit Line and Phahon Yothin MRT station on MRT Blue Line.

The Central Phaholyothin is a shopping mall under construction by Central Pattana. It will be located between Phahonyothin road (the section of the road between Ha Yaek Lat Phrao and Phahon Yothin 24 BTS stations) and Vibhavadi Rangsit Road.

== Anchor ==
- Central The Store @ Ladprao
  - Power Buy
  - Supersports
  - B2S Think Space
  - Living House at Central
- Tops Food Hall (Old Tops Market)
  - Tops Flavour
- BCC Hall
- SFX Cinema 10 Cinemas
- Centara Grand at Central Ladprao

== See also ==
- List of shopping malls in Thailand
- List of largest shopping malls in Thailand

== Bibliography ==
- Central Pattana (2011). Annual Report 2010 (PDF).
- Central Pattana (21 March 2012). Annual Report 2011 (PDF). Archived from the original (PDF) on 8 March 2022.
