= Lat Phrao Road =

Street in Bangkok, Thailand

Coordinates: 13.7922°N 100.5989°E

Lad Phrao Road
- ถนนลาดพร้าว; Thanon Lad Phrao
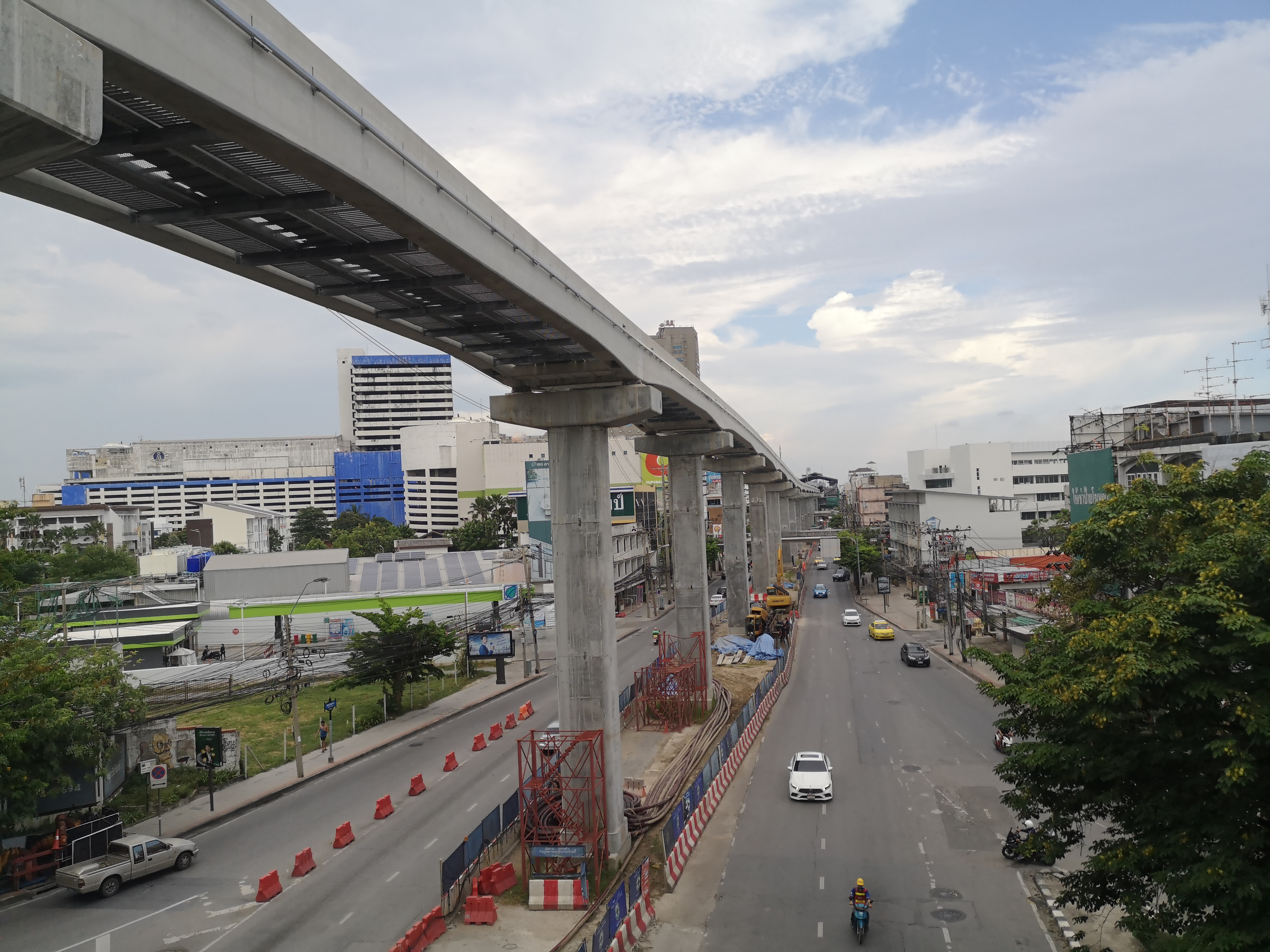

Major junctions
- Northwest end: AH2 Lat Phrao Intersection, Chatuchak district, Bangkok
- Ratchada-Lad Phrao Intersection, Chatuchak district, Bangkok; Pradit Manutham Road, Wang Thonglang district, Bangkok; Srinagarindra Road, Bang Kapi, Bangkok
- Southeast end: Bang Kapi Intersection, Bang Kapi, Bangkok

Location
- Country: Thailand

Highway system
- Highways in Thailand; Motorways; Asian Highways

Lat Phrao Road (Thai: ถนนลาดพร้าว, RTGS: Thanon Lat Phrao, pronounced [tʰā.nǒn lâːt pʰráːw]) is one main road in Bangkok, Thailand. Despite its name the road does not run through the nearby Lat Phrao District. It begins at an intersection with Phahonyothin Road, at the corner of the Lat Phrao Square, CentralPlaza Ladprao, and Union Mall in Chatuchak District, and passes through Huai Khwang and Wang Thonglang Districts, ending in Bang Kapi District. The road is serviced by two MRT Blue Line stations: Phahon Yothin and Lat Phrao, along with the monorail MRT Yellow Line, running along the road from the Lat Phrao-Ratchadaphisek junction (YL01 Lat Phrao) to YL08 Bang Kapi station. The BTS Skytrain also serves the road at Ha Yaek Lat Phrao station.

This road was originally known as "Bangkok–Bang Kapi Road" (ถนนกรุงเทพ–บางกะปิ), running through the area once called "Thung Bang Kapi" (ทุ่งบางกะปิ), vast rice fields on the northeastern outskirts of Bangkok, about 16 km (9.94 mi) from the city centre. The area was mostly open fields, with some parts covered in forest. Khlong Saen Saep, dug during the reign of King Rama III, also passed through this area.

Lat Phrao Road was constructed in 1945, at the end of World War II. At that time, it was a dirt road intersecting with the Sam Yaek Saphan Khlong Saen Saep (a three-way junction). Over the years, it underwent significant development and became home to a growing community.

Chok Chai 4 Road, also popularly known as Soi Chok Chai 4 or Soi Lat Phrao 53, is considered the liveliest part of Lat Phrao Road. It is a large residential area bustling with day and night markets, convenience stores, homes, a police station, and more. It also provides convenient access to major roads like Prasert Manukitch, Pradit Manutham, and Lat Phrao Wang Hin.
