= Phawana MRT station =

Monorail station in Bangkok, Thailand

Phawana ภาวนา
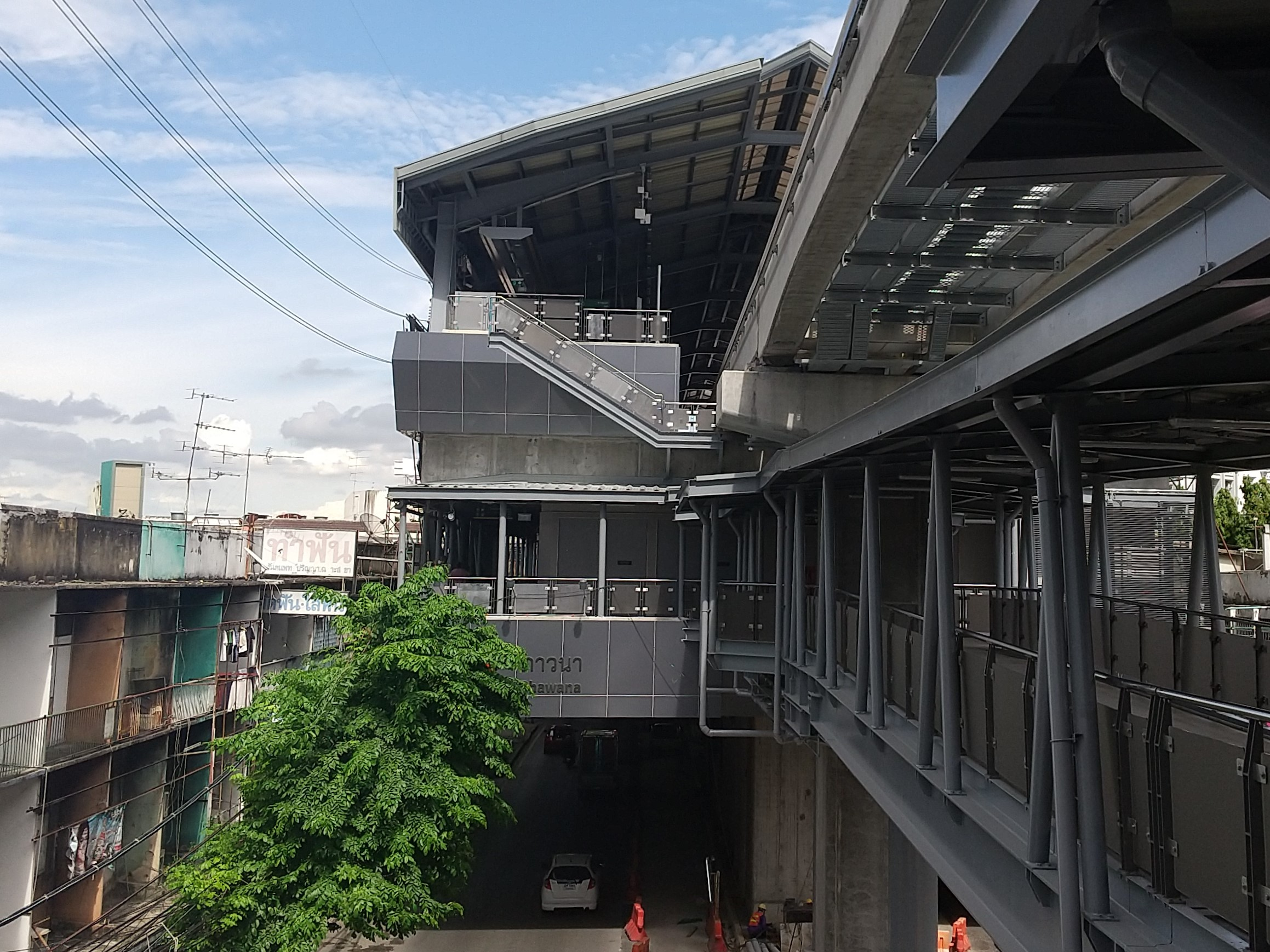

General information
- Location: Huai Khwang District, Bangkok, Thailand
- Coordinates: 13.8002°N 100.5841°E
- System
- Owner: Mass Rapid Transit Authority of Thailand (MRTA)
- Operator: Eastern Bangkok Monorail Company Limited (EBM)
- Line: Yellow Line

Other information
- Station code: YL2

History
- Opened: 12 June 2023; 3 years ago

Services
Preceding station	Metropolitan Rapid Transit	Following station
Lat Phrao Terminus	Yellow Line	Chok Chai 4 towards Samrong
Location

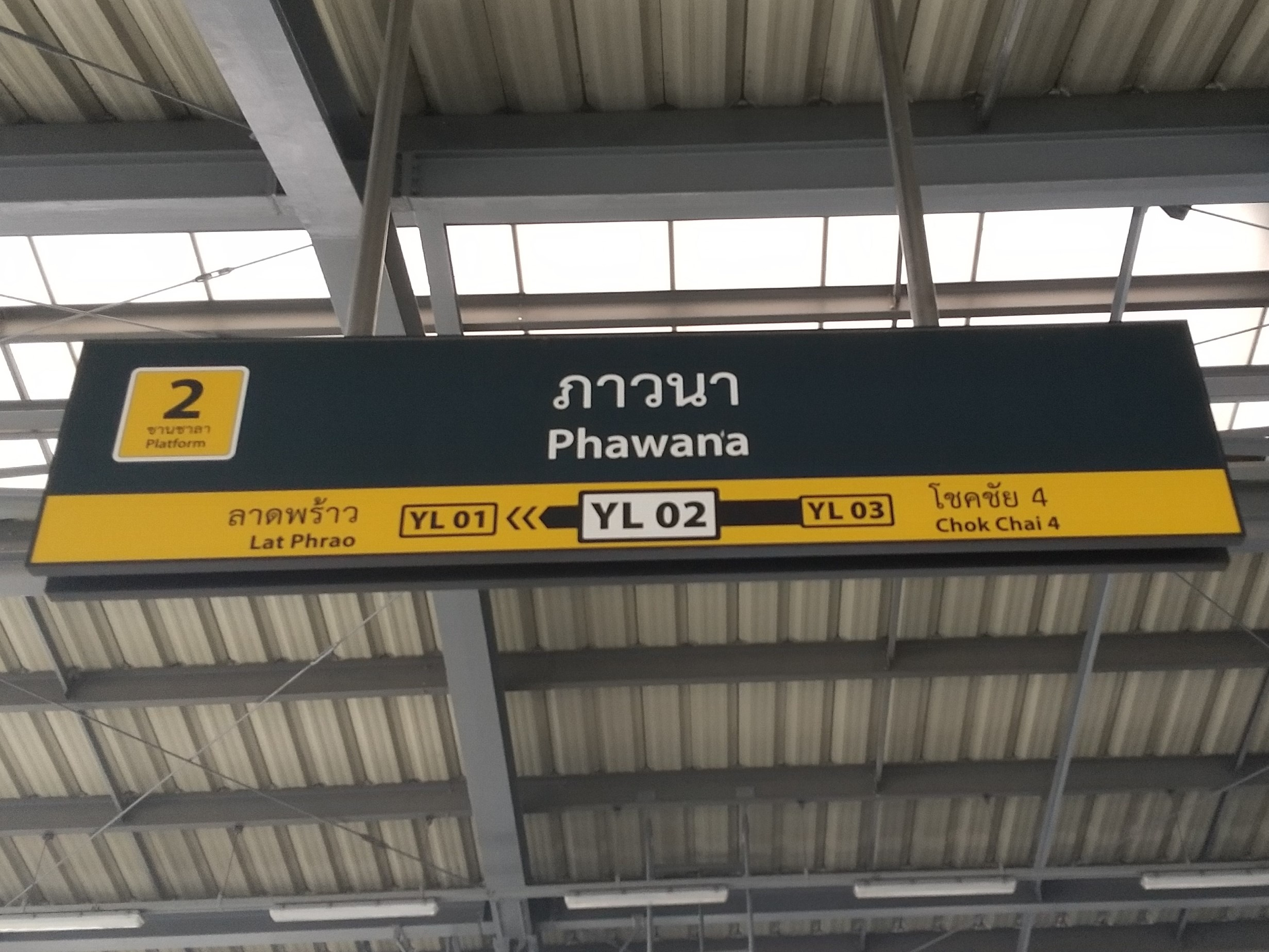
Signage

Phawana station (Thai: สถานีภาวนา) is a Bangkok MRT station on the Yellow Line. The station is located on Lat Phrao Road, near soi Lat Phrao 41 (soi Phawana) in Huai Khwang District, Bangkok. The station has four entrances. It opened on 12 June 2023 as part of trial operations on the line between Hua Mak and this station. The final section between Phawana and Lat Phrao opened on 19 June 2023.

== Station layout ==
U3	Side platform, doors will open on the left
U3	Platform 1	Yellow towards Samrong (Chok Chai 4)
U3	Platform 2	Yellow towards Lat Phrao (Lat Phrao)
U3	Side platform, doors will open on the left
U2	Concourse	Exit 1-4, Ticket machines
G	-	Bus stop, Lat Phrao Road
