= Lat Phrao MRT station =

Subway station in Bangkok, Thailand

Coordinates: 13.8064°N 100.5730°E

Lat Phrao ลาดพร้าว
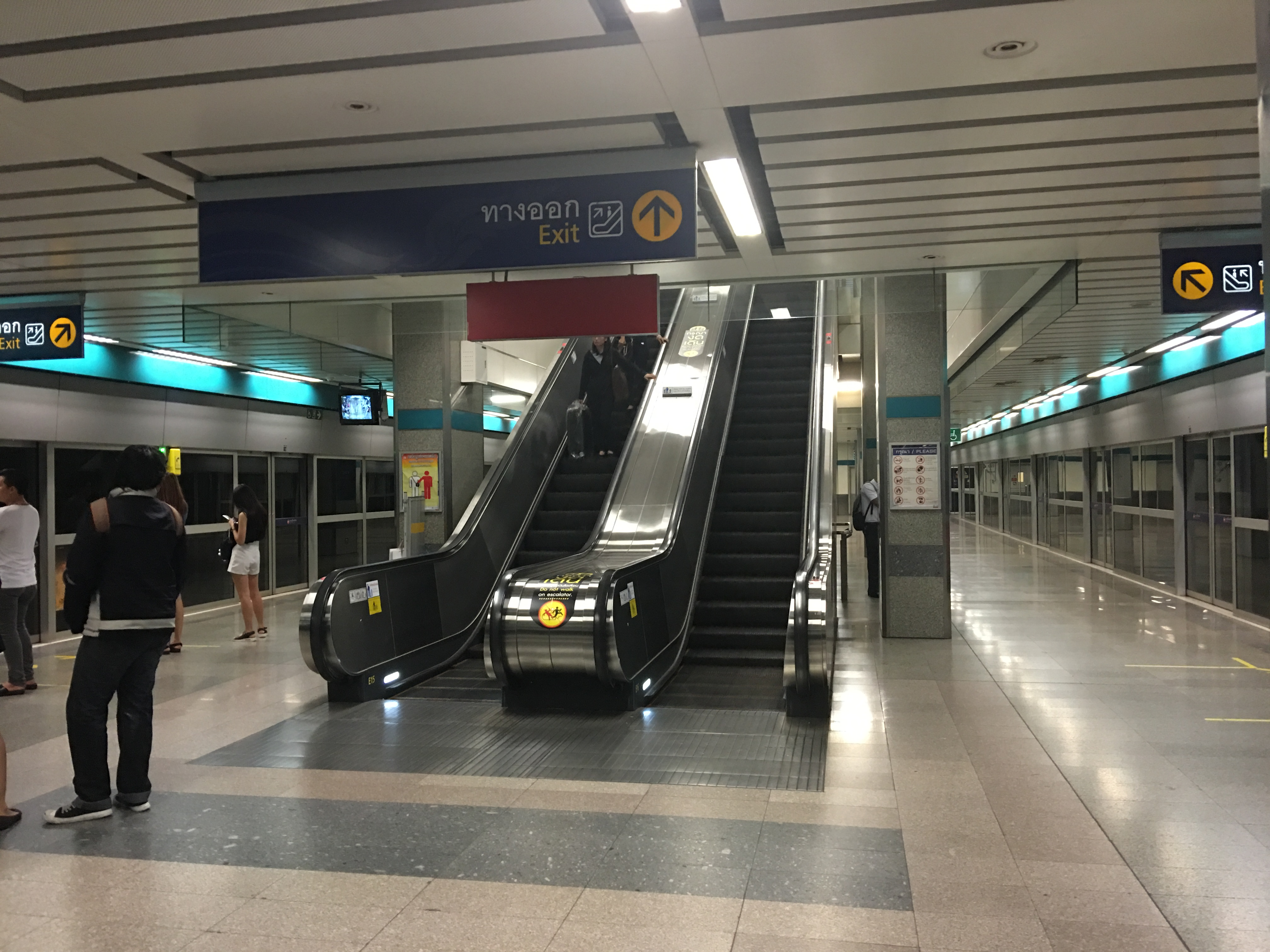
- Blue Line platforms

General information
- Location: Chatuchak, Bangkok, Thailand
- System: MRT MRT
- Owner: Mass Rapid Transit Authority of Thailand (MRTA)
- Operator: Bangkok Expressway and Metro Public Company Limited (BEM) (Blue); Eastern Bangkok Monorail Company Limited (EBM) (Yellow)
- Lines: MRT Blue Line; MRT Yellow Line
- Platforms: 1 island platform (Blue); 2 side platform (Yellow)
- Tracks: 2 (Blue Line); 2 (Yellow Line)

Construction
- Structure type: Underground (Blue Line); Elevated (Yellow Line)
- Accessible: yes

Other information
- Station code: BL15 (Blue Line); YL1 (Yellow Line)

History
- Opened: 3 July 2004; 22 years ago (Blue); 19 June 2023; 3 years ago (Yellow)

Passengers
- 2021: 3,779,865 (Blue)

Services
Preceding station	Metropolitan Rapid Transit	Following station
Ratchadaphisek towards Lak Song	Blue Line	Phahon Yothin towards Tha Phra via Bang Sue
Terminus	Yellow Line	Phawana towards Samrong
Location

Lat Phrao station (Thai: สถานีลาดพร้าว, pronounced [sā.tʰǎː.nīː lâːt pʰráːw]) is the name of two Bangkok MRT stations, on the Blue Line and Yellow Line, located at the intersection of Ratchadaphisek Road and Lat Phrao Road. It is the northern terminus of the Yellow Line. Although the station's name is Lat Phrao, it is located in Chatuchak district, not Lat Phrao district and Central Ladprao is nearer to Phahon Yothin station. The station serves the Suan Lum Night Bazaar Ratchadaphisek and several government institutions, including the Court of Appeal, the Bangkok North Municipal Court and Judicial Training Institute.

Because the MRT Blue and Yellow Lines are operated by different operators, there is no interchange between the two lines within the paid areas nor is there a common farecard shared by the two. However, a covered skywalk and a passageway linking the two stations via a park and ride building allow passengers to interchange between the two lines.

Its symbol color is light blue.

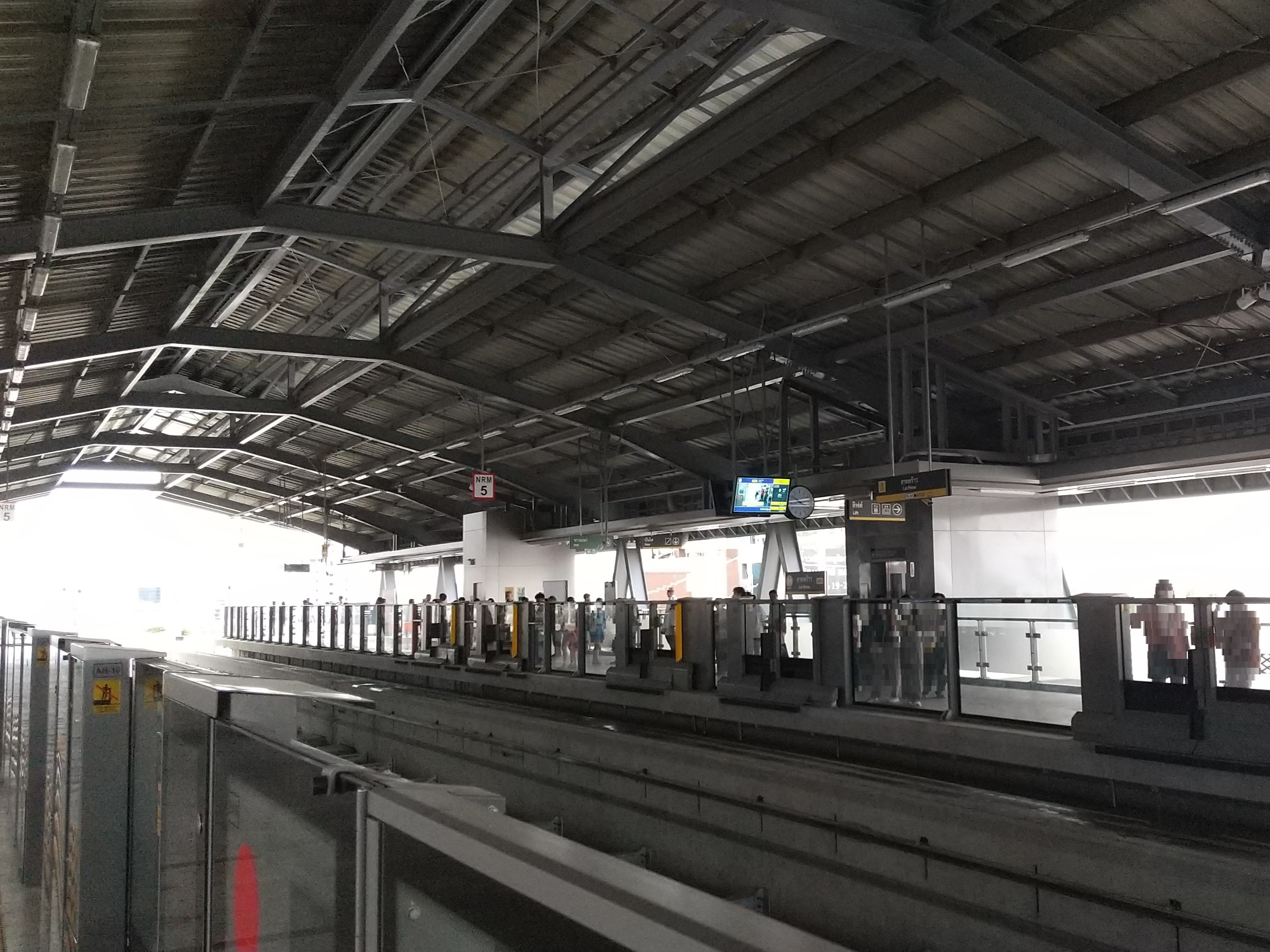
Yellow Line platforms

== Blue Line ==
The underground station serving the Blue Line opened on 3 July 2004. The name "Lat Phrao" refers to the fact that the Blue Line is running underneath Lat Phrao Road, as opposed to Ratchadapisek Road. Commuters mistakenly believed that the station serves Central Ladprao, which is instead served by the next station, Phahon Yothin.

=== Exit List ===
All exits for the Blue Line station have lift and escalator access.

- Exit 1: Soi Lat Phrao 26, Ratchada-Lat Phrao Junction, Suan Lum Night Bazaar Ratchadapisek, Bazaar Hotel
- Exit 2: Soi Lat Phrao 24
- Exit 3: Soi Lat Phrao 17
- Exit 4: Park and Ride Building (unpaid connection to Yellow Line station), Bangkok North Municipal Court

=== Station Layout ===
G	Street level	Bus stops and skywalk to Yellow Line station
B1	Basement	Blue Exits 1–4, passageway via Gourmet Market/Park and Ride Building to Yellow Line station
B2	Concourse	Blue Ticket machines and faregates
B3	Platform 2	Blue towards Tha Phra via Bang Sue (Phahon Yothin)
B3	Island platform, doors will open on the right
B3	Platform 1	Blue towards Lak Song (Ratchadaphisek)

== Yellow Line ==
The Yellow Line station opened on 19 June 2023 as a one-station extension of the line from Phawana. The Yellow Line station is located above Ratchadapisek Road, specifically on the north of Lat Phrao-Ratchada Intersection.

=== Exit List ===
- Exit 1: East side of Ratchadapisek Road (lift and escalator access available)
- Exit 2: East side of Ratchadapisek Road (lift and escalator access available)
- Exit 3: Ratchada-Lat Phrao Junction skywalks, Bazaar Hotel via skywalk (escalator access available)
- Exit 4: Park and Ride Building and Gourmet Market, unpaid access to MRT Blue Line (lift access available)
- Exit 5: The Court of Appeal, Bangkok North Municapal Court, Court Museum of Thailand and Archives, Judicial Training Institute

=== Station Layout ===
U4	Side platform, doors will open on the left
U4	Platform 1	Yellow towards Samrong (Phawana)
U4	Platform 2	Yellow termination platform
U4	Side platform, doors will open on the left
U3	Concourse	Yellow Exit 1-2, Ticket machines
U2		Yellow Exit 3-5
G	Street level	Bus stop
