= M-map =

M-map may refer to:

- Mahoney map, an extended variant of Karnaugh maps in logic optimization
- Mass Rapid Transit Master Plan in Bangkok Metropolitan Region
