= Bang Na–Suvarnabhumi light rail =

Proposed light rail line in Bangkok

Bang Na–Suvarnabhumi line
- 15

Overview
- Native name: รถไฟฟ้าสายสีเงิน
- Status: Feasibility study
- Owner: Mass Rapid Transit Authority of Thailand
- Locale: Bangkok, Samut Prakan
- Termini: Bang Na; Suvarnabhumi Airport
- Stations: 14

Service
- Type: Light rail, Rapid transit
- System: MRT
- Depot: Thana City depot

History
- Opened: 2033 (planned)

Technical
- Line length: 19.7 km (12.2 mi)
- Number of tracks: 2
- Track gauge: 1,435 mm (4 ft 8 1/2 in) standard gauge
- Electrification: Third rail
- Operating speed: 80 km/h (50 mph)

The Bang Na–Suvarnabhumi line is a proposed light rail line in Bangkok that would run from Bang Na junction to Suvarnabhumi Airport. The line was first proposed in 1994, but it was not included in the 2005 OTP Mass Rapid Transit Master Plan. Initially, it was planned for the line to potentially be a branch line of BTS Skytrain's Sukhumvit Line with turnouts constructed near Bang Na junction. In December 2015, the BMA said it would advance construction and would propose it to cabinet in the near future. In April 2016, deputy governor Amorn Kitchawengkul said the project would take 3 to 6 years and cost THB 20 billion.

The line would be proposed to be constructed in two phases: first, for 14.7 kilometres (9.1 mi) to Thana City and then a later 5.1 km (3.2 mi) extension to the airport. The project would relieve congestion along the busy Bang Na–Trat Road corridor and provide an important southern connection to Suvarnabhumi Airport. Initial forecasts of daily passengers are 56,000 upon opening rising to 139,000 daily when the extension to the airport opens.

In early September 2021, the BMA contracted consultants to undertake a six-month feasibility study into the line. The feasibility study was completed in March 2022. On 8 April 2022, the BMA deputy permanent secretary conducted a market sounding seminar to detail the project to potential investors and advised that the report would be submitted to the Interior Ministry for endorsement. If the Interior Ministry approves the project it will be submitted to Cabinet for approval in 2023.

The BMA proposes to gain Cabinet approval for the line in 2023 and conduct a tender in 2024 with a suggested three-year construction period commencing in 2025 for a targeted opening date of 2029. However, BMA transferred the project to the Mass Rapid Transit Authority of Thailand (MRTA) on December 27, 2024, as it is believed that consolidating the project under a single owner will enable better control of fare prices, preventing them from becoming excessively high. After the transfer, the MRTA will reassess the project to determine the feasibility of further construction.

== Route alignment ==
=== Bang Na–Thana City section ===
This section starts at the Sunphawut road (in front of MEA Bang Na District, Bang Na District Office, and Phra Khanong Provincial Court), runs along the said road, pass Bang Na intersection, above the outbound Debaratana road's median, pass across Si Iam interchange which connects to MRTA Yellow Line, over the Kingkaew interchange which is a transfer point to Kingkaew-Suvarnabhumi Monorail, and terminate at Thana City. This section's ending terminus is at the 13th kilometre of Debaratana road and the depot of the line itself. There will be a 46,400 m^{2} (500,000 sq ft) depot at Thana City, which the BMA will purchase from U City Public Co. Ltd., the owner of Thana City project.

=== Thana City–Suvarnabhumi ===
The line continues from the Thana City and passes Central Village and Krirk University before crossing Nong Prue and Nong Ngu Hao canal. The terminus is the future south terminal of Suvarnabhumi Airport which has not yet started construction. However, AoT has modified the terminal to give the line direct access to the passenger building, unlike Suvarnabhumi ARL Station which was built in an unused Novotel Suvarnabhumi walkway.

=== Route changes ===
- 2016 - The starting terminus was changed from Udom Suk BTS Station to Sunphawut intersection, in front of Phra Khanong Provincial Court and the new Bang Na District Office. This change will ease the trip to contact these government offices.
- May 2018 - OTP and JICA agreed to completely reconsider the route. The line was extended from Sanphawut intersection to run above Thang Rotfai Sai Kao Pak Nam Road, into At Narong Road, along Chalerm Maha Nakhon Expressway, turn to Rama III Road, and end at the Chao Phraya River. The area around the river terminus will be developed into a new SRT economic zone. Additionally, the cancellation of the route Thana City-Si Waree Noi Temple was discussed. Although the cancellation would decrease the length of the line, the focus was on moving people to and from Suvarnabhumi Airport. The aforementioned route is to be included in M-Map 2.

== History ==
The line initially appeared on the 1994 Mass Rapid Transit Master Plan (MTMP), before it was further improved in the 1996 CTMP. It was an extension to the Tanayong SkyTrain until it was canceled when Urban Rail Transportation Master Plan in Bangkok and Surrounding Areas (URMAP) was developed in 2000. Then, in a 2004 OTP meeting, it was decided that the route needed to be expanded to meet the need of the expanding Bangkok. The route was finally determined to terminate at the Sri Iam interchange and Suvarnabhumi Airport. However, the line was not included in the 2005 OTP Mass Rapid Transit Master Plan.

When the BTS Sukhumvit Line extension from On Nut to Bearing was completed in August 2011. provision was made with turnouts constructed near Bang Na junction for a future BTS spur line from Bang Na junction to the airport. However, the BMA later decided that the line would be a separate light-rail line.

=== Recent planning progress ===
In early September 2021, the BMA Traffic and Transport Department contracted consultants to undertake a six-month feasibility study into the line. The consultants would evaluate a PPP framework for the project and conduct market sounding seminars as part of the study. The line would be proposed to be constructed in two phases. Firstly, for 14.7 km (9.1 mi) to Thana City and then a later 5.1 km (3.2 mi) extension to the Airport. Initial forecasts of daily passengers are 56,000 upon opening rising to 139,000 daily when the extension to the airport opens.

The feasibility study was completed in March 2022. On 8 April 2022, the BMA deputy permanent secretary conducted a market sounding seminar to detail the project to potential investors and advised that the report would be submitted to the Interior Ministry for endorsement. The BMA stated that the study concluded that the LRT should have a maximum speed of 80 kilometres per hour (50 mph) with a 30-minute trip time with capacity for 15,000 to 30,000 passengers per hour. If the Interior Ministry approves the project it will be submitted to Cabinet for approval in 2023.

== Project details ==
The LRT system will be 1,435 mm (4 ft 8 1/2 in) standard gauge with third rail electrification and max speed of 80 km/h (50 mph) with automatic signalling system, allowing the round trip in 1 hour. The LRT rolling stock will be a four-car formation able to transport between 15,000 and 30,000 passengers per hour. The minimum fare is planned to be 14 baht to a maximum 46 baht.

== List of planned stations ==
There are 14 stations planned including 13 elevated stations and one underground station at the airport. Station names are subject to change. Station codes are still not determined. Each station is planned to be equipped with platform screen doors.

Code	Station Name	Transfer	Location
SV01	Bang Na	BTS : Bang Na BTS station	Bangkok
SV02	Prapha Montri		Bangkok
SV03	Bang Na–Trat 17		Bangkok
SV04	Bang Na–Trat 25		Bangkok
SV05	Wat Si Iam	MRT : Si Iam MRT station	Bangkok
SV06	Prem Ruethai		Samut Prakan
SV07	Bang Na–Trat Km.6		Samut Prakan
SV08	Bang Kaeo		Samut Prakan
SV09	Kanchanaphisek		Samut Prakan
SV10	Wat Salut		Samut Prakan
SV11	King Kaeo		Samut Prakan
SV12	Thana City		Samut Prakan
SV13	Krirk University		Samut Prakan
SV14	Suvarnabhumi South Terminal	ARL : Suvarnabhumi station	Samut Prakan

== Network map ==
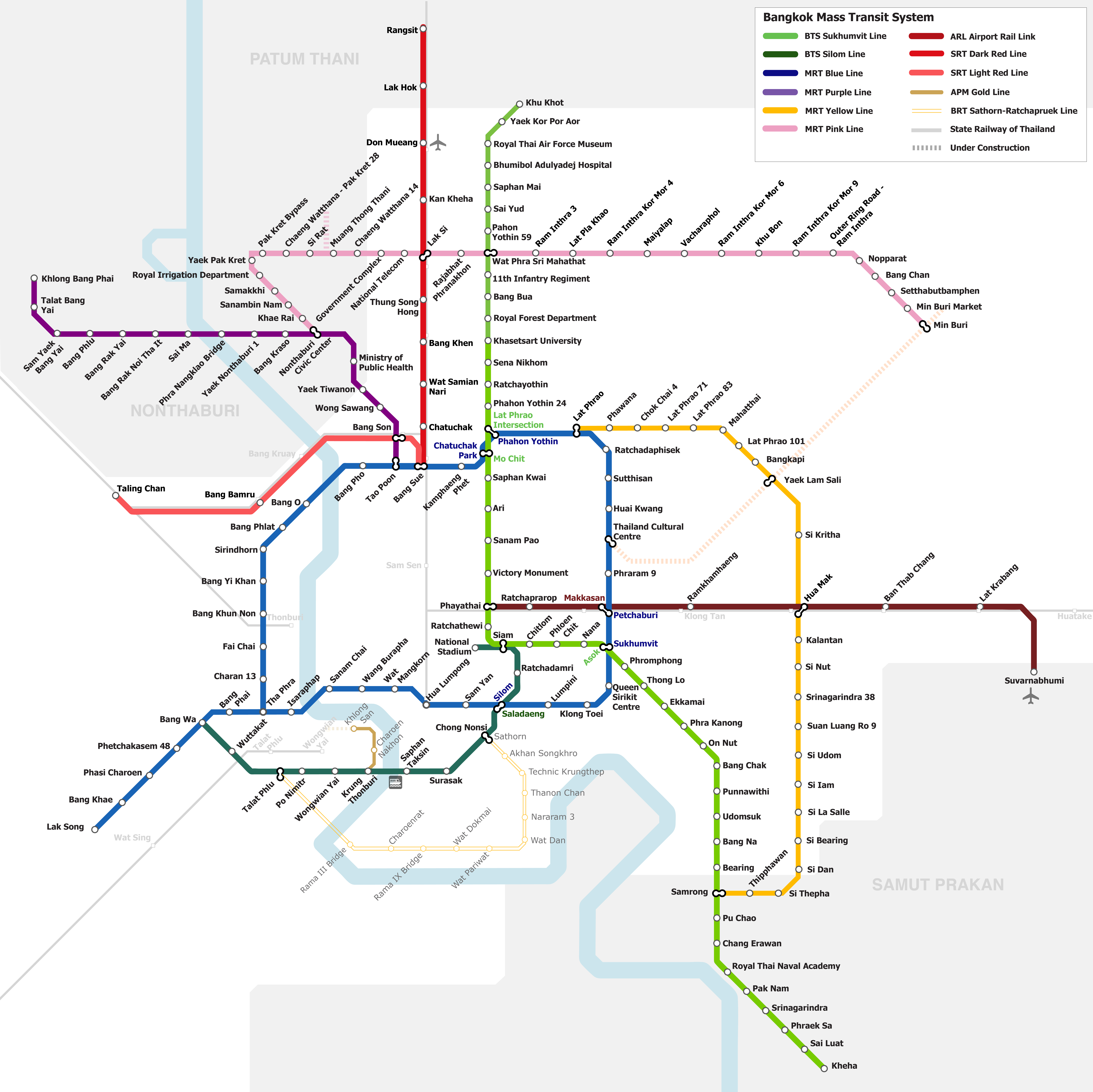

== See also ==
- Mass Rapid Transit Master Plan in Bangkok Metropolitan Region
- MRT (Bangkok)
- MRT Blue Line
- MRT Brown Line
- MRT Grey Line
- MRT Light Blue Line
- MRT Orange Line
- MRT Purple Line
- MRT Pink Line
- BTS Skytrain
- BTS Sukhumvit Line
- BTS Silom Line
- Airport Rail Link (Bangkok)
- SRT Dark Red Line
- SRT Light Red Line
- Bangkok BRT
- BMA Gold Line
