= Brown Line (Bangkok) =

Proposed rapid transit line in Thailand

MRT Brown Line รถไฟฟ้าสายสีน้ำตาล
- 13

Overview
- Status: Design phase, planned tender in late 2024
- Owner: Mass Rapid Transit Authority of Thailand
- Locale: Bangkok and Nonthaburi, Thailand
- Termini: Nonthaburi Civic Center; Yaek Lam Sali
- Stations: 20

Service
- Type: Monorail
- System: MRT
- Daily ridership: est. 70,000-80,000

Technical
- Line length: 22.1 kilometers (13.7 mi) (est.)
- Number of tracks: 2 monorail tracks
- Character: Elevated
- Operating speed: 80 km/h (50 mph)

The MRT Brown Line is a 22.1 km proposed monorail mass transit line in Bangkok, Thailand from Nonthaburi Civic Centre, Nonthaburi Province to Lam Sali intersection, Bang Kapi District. 20 stations are proposed for the line and the expected cost for the project is 48 billion baht. The line has been integrated for 7.2 km with the N2 expressway project and a feasibility study has been completed. The MRT Brown line will interchange with 7 other mass transit lines.

Multiple delays on the alignment and construction of the MRT Brown Line have been experienced, largely due to changes in government policy, concerns from local community groups and the alignment of the planned N2 expressway.

The MRTA announced in August 2025 another review of the MRT Brown line due to the government's 20-baht flat fare policy and the redesign of the N2 section of the third-stage expressway which runs along the route. The study is to be completed by late-2025 with submission to the Cabinet in early 2026, with bidding for the line expected in late-2026.

== Route alignment ==
The MRT Brown Line starts at Nonthaburi Civic Centre where it interchanges with both the MRT Purple Line & MRT Pink Lines. It heads east along Ngam Wong Wan road through Khae Rai intersection and then Vihavadi-Rangsit road to interchange with the SRT Dark Red Line at Bang Khen. The Brown line continues past Kasetsart University to interchange with the BTS Sukhumvit Line at Kasetsart University on Phahon Yothin Road.

The line continues east along Prasote Manukitch Road (AKA Kaset-Nawamin Road) past Chalong Rat Expressway (interchanging with the proposed BMA Grey Line) to Nawamin Road. The line then turns south along Nawamin Road over Lam Phang Phuai lake and past Klong Chan Stadium. The line continues further southeast along Nawamin Road where it then terminates at Ramkhamhaeng rd (soi 129/1), Lam Sali junction to interchange with the MRT Orange Line and MRT Yellow Line.

== History ==
The line was first proposed as the Gold Line by the Pheu Thai party (พรรคเพื่อไทย) for the Bangkok Governors election held in March 2013. This was in response to objections by Kasetsart University and as an alternative to a long-proposed elevated Expressway extension, the N2 expressway project. However, the Pheu Thai candidate did not win the election and the Gold Line proposal was dropped with the then Deputy Minister of Transport stating that land appropriation costs were too high. (The Gold Line name was later used for the BMA Gold Line ).

Subsequently, the Office of Transport and Traffic Policy and Planning (OTP) reworked the Gold Line proposal into a new MRT Brown Line monorail proposal and this was endorsed by the MRTA Board in August 2013. The route was under preliminary study by OTP from June 2013, but did not progress much before the May 2014 coup and change of government. Subsequently, the route was finalised by OTP and public hearings into the project were held during 2017 as the government proposed integrating the design with a new expressway. In mid-2017, the MOT announced that a final feasibility study would be completed over 14 months.

This line is not to be confused with the original OTP 2004 13 km MRT Brown Line proposal from Bangkapi to Min Buri which was taken to the 2005 election. In 2009, this plan was subsequently changed and the original 13 km Brown Line was merged into an extended MRT Orange Line, which is currently under construction.

== Progress ==
In August 2013, the MRTA approved the MRT Brown line in principle to complete the design by 2016 with an expected 3-year construction period for a 2021 opening. However, the line was delayed while a long planned expressway along much of the same route was prioritized. Public hearings on the Brown line was held in 2017. The MOT announced that a 14-month feasibility study into the line would be completed by 2018.

The feasibility study was undertaken during the same period where design for the N2 expressway (which runs along Kaset-Namawin rd) was being finalised by EXAT without catering for the MRT Brown Line. Work was expected to commence on the expressway in 2019. OTP and MOT subsequently proposed an integrated design and construction of the Brown Line jointly with the N2 expressway which was approved by Cabinet. However, the Brown Line crossing of Vihavadi-Rangsit rd and the Don Muang elevated expressway might require a diversion of the Brown Line further north for the line to pass at this point depending on the final route design of the N2 expressway. In February 2018, OTP confirmed that the study integrating the MRT Brown Line with the Expressway design would be done by June 2018.

By August 2018, OTP had completed the feasibility study and conducted public hearings. Although, there was much public support for building the MRT Brown line, public opposition to the N2 expressway remained high. OTP intended to submit the project for Cabinet approval by the end of October 2018. In early June 2019, the MRTA Board approved the investment plan for the Brown Line and integrated design with the N2 Expressway conducted by EXAT. The design process was expected to be completed by late 2020 after further discussions regarding land access around Kasetsart University were conducted between EXAT, the MRTA, the Rural Highways Department and Kasetsart University in June 2020. In early November 2020, the MRTA Governor stated that the OTP had submitted the preliminary Environment (EIA) to the National Environment Board for review and that land expropriation surveys in some areas along the route were still being finalised. Final design was expected to be completed by December 2020. However, the detailed design was expected to take longer to be completed by September 2022.

The line will require the 435 plots of land along the route to be appropriated in order for the line to be built.

In May 2023, the MRTA approved another feasibility study to be completed by December 2023 with construction tentatively starting from 2025.

The MRTA announced in August 2025 another review of the MRT Brown line due to the government's 20-baht flat fare policy and the redesign of the N2 section of the third-stage expressway which runs along the route. The study is to be completed by late-2025 with submission to the Cabinet in early 2026, with bidding for the line expected in late-2026.

== Stations ==
The 22.1 km Brown line is proposed to have 20 stations:

Note: Station names are provisional.

Code	Station Name	Transfers	Province
BR01	Nonthaburi Civic Center	MRT MRT	Nonthaburi
BR02	Khae Rai		Nonthaburi
BR03	Khlong Yat Lao (Ngam Wong Wan 12)		Bangkok
BR04	Pracha Chuen intersection		Bangkok
BR05	Chinnakhet		Bangkok
BR06	Bang Khen	SRT Bang Khen Station	Bangkok
BR07	Kasetsart University (Gate 2)		Bangkok
BR08	Kasetsart University	BTS Kasetsart University	Bangkok
BR09	Bang Bua		Bangkok
BR10	Lat Pla Khao		Bangkok
BR11	Prasoet Manu Kit 18		Bangkok
BR12	Sukhonthasawat		Bangkok
BR13	Chalong Rat	MRL Kaset Nawamin (proposed)	Bangkok
BR14	Khlong Lamchiak		Bangkok
BR15	Nuan Chan 11		Bangkok
BR16	Yaek Nawamin		Bangkok
BR17	Inthrarak		Bangkok
BR18	Nawamin Phirom		Bangkok
BR19	Seri Thai/Khlong Chan Stadium		Bangkok
BR20	Yaek Lam Sali	MRT (under construction) MRT	Bangkok

== Network map ==
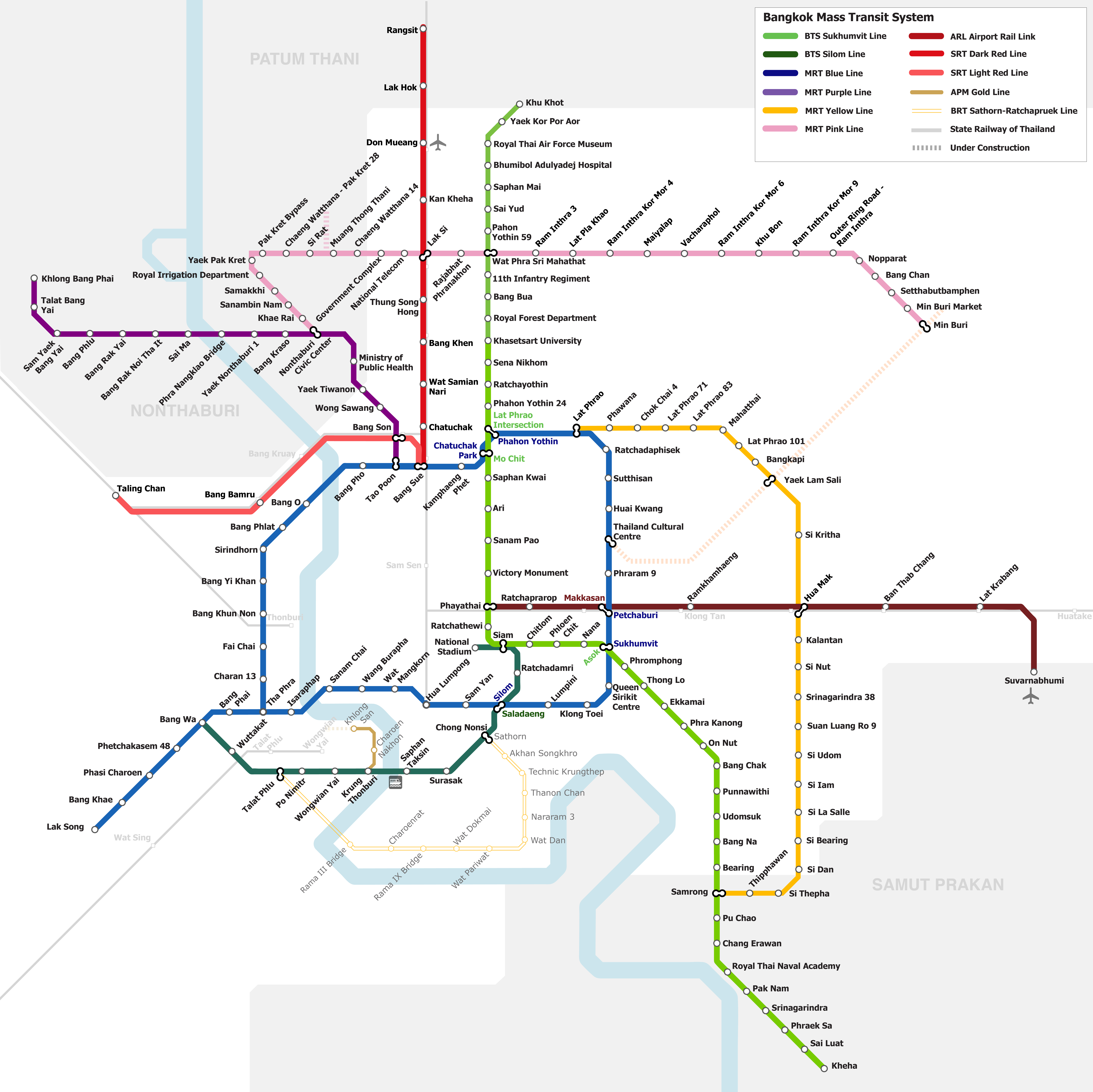

== See also ==
- Mass Rapid Transit Master Plan in Bangkok Metropolitan Region
- MRT (Bangkok)
- MRT Blue Line
- MRT Grey Line
- MRT Light Blue Line
- MRT Orange Line
- MRT Pink Line
- MRT Purple Line
- MRT Yellow Line
- BTS Skytrain
- BTS Sukhumvit Line
- BTS Silom Line
- Airport Rail Link (Bangkok)
- SRT Light Red Line
- SRT Dark Red Line
- Bangkok BRT
- BMA Gold Line
- BMA Bang Na-Suvarnabhumi Line
