= Grey Line (Bangkok) =

Grey Line รถไฟฟ้าสายสีเทา

Overview
- Status: Feasibility study
- Owner: Mass Rapid Transit Authority of Thailand
- Locale: Bangkok, Thailand
- Termini: Watcharaphon; Thong Lo
- Stations: 15 (planned)

Service
- Type: Monorail
- System: MRT
- Services: 2

Technical
- Line length: 16.25 kilometers (10.10 mi) (est.)
- Electrification: TBC once the line is designed & later tendered
- Operating speed: 80 km/h (50 mph) TBC

The Grey Line is a planned monorail line in the north of Bangkok to be built from Watcharaphon to Thong Lo. The route would provide a vital north - south link for a distance of 16.25 km with 15 planned stations and is expected to cost 27 billion baht. The line would support the growth of residential areas around Pradit Monutham Road and Kaset-Namawin road corridors and is forecast to eventually have 370,000 passengers per day. The BMA Grey will interchange with other lines including the MRT Pink Line, the proposed MRT Brown Line, the MRT Yellow Line, MRT Orange Line (under construction) and BTS Sukhumvit Line.

The BMA contracted a consultants study into the project which was due to be completed by March 2022. A new EIA for the line was completed and approved by the National Environment Board in early March 2022. On 17 March 2022, the BMA held a market sounding seminar with companies interested in potentially bidding for the line and updated that the feasibility study would be completed by early June 2022.

The BMA proposes to gain Cabinet approval for the line in 2023 and identify private investor partners in 2024-2025 with a view to commencing construction in 2026 in order for the line to open in 2030. However, BMA transferred the project to the Mass Rapid Transit Authority of Thailand (MRTA) on December 27, 2024, as it is believed that consolidating the project under a single owner will enable better control of fare prices, preventing them from becoming excessively high. After the transfer, the MRTA will reassess the project to determine the feasibility of further construction.

== Route alignment ==
The route runs from Ram Indra Road, in the northeast of Bangkok, where it interchanges with the MRT Pink Line (under construction) running south on Pradit Manuthum Rd along the Chalongrat Expressway corridor. It then interchanges with the proposed MRT Brown Line at Chalongrat Intersection (Kaset-Namawin rd) and continues further south to interchange with MRT Yellow Line at Lat Phrao rd before continuing further south along Pradit Manuthum Rd to interchange with the MRT Orange Line at Rama 9. Finally, the line continues south then south west into Sukhumvit soi 55 before terminating at the downtown district of Thong Lo where it interchanges with BTS Sukhumvit Line.

== History ==
In August 2011, the newly elected Yingluck Shinawatra government decided to defer plans for the Grey Line and the Light Blue Line, citing that the lines are not a priority within their current 10 lines Master plan. The government suggested the Bangkok Metropolitan Administration pursue construction but stated that the BMA would have to fully fund the line itself.

The BMA stated in mid 2013 that it considered the line a priority and wanted to progress planning by completing an EIA by the end of 2013 with the aim for the line to be tendered by early 2014. Construction would have then taken place from 2015 - 2017 for a potential opening in 2018. In March 2014, the OTP stated that they would contract a consultant to undertake further study of the line. In May 2014, a consultant was contracted to undertake a financial feasibility study of the line, scheduled to complete the work by the end of 2014. A second public hearing on the proposed line was held in January 2015. An environmental impact assessment was completed in September 2016. However, the EIA did not receive approval from the National Environment Board thus suspending the project.

=== Recent planning progress ===
In June 2018, the Bangkok Metropolitan Administration (BMA) vowed to revive the project by rectifying the EIA and resolve opposition from locals in the Thong Lor area. The BMA also sought to gain approval and support from the Expressway Authority of Thailand (EXAT) to construct the line along the Pradit Monutham rd/Chalongrat Expressway corridor. In September 2018, the MRTA Governor stated that the MRTA would like to build the proposed Grey line in order to provide a feeder line to the MRT Pink Line and the MRT Brown Line. Also, given that the MRTA was already working with the Expressway Authority of Thailand regarding an integrated design for the MRT Brown line, the MRTA could use that experience to gain access to land needed for the Grey line, especially at the MRT Brown line interchange at Kaset-Namawin rd. However, the BMA refused to transfer the line to the MRTA.

In August 2021, the BMA hired consulting firms to provide analysis for a public-private partnership (PPP) to build the line. The consultants feasibility study was expected to completed by March 2022. However on 17 March 2022, the BMA held a market sounding seminar with companies interested in potentially bidding for the line and updated that the feasibility study would be completed by early June 2022. During the seminar, the BMA also presented engineering and environmental data to the companies. The BMA forecasts 97,000 pax per day when the line is planned to open in 2030 rising to 161,000 pax per day by 2034. After 40 years, the line is forecast to have 370,000 daily pax. A final seminar was held on 27 May 2022. The BMA advised that it would seek approval for the line from the Ministry of Interior in 2–3 months. Reporters in attendance also noted that the newly elected BMA Governor had expressed a preference for the MRTA to handle the project.

== Potential Phase 2 and 3 extensions ==
Also under consideration is a Phase 2 and Phase 3 extension along the length of Rama 3 rd, over the Chao Phraya river and along Ratchadapisek rd (Inner Ring rd) to Tha Phra to replace the BRT along this route. This would enable the Grey Line to interchange with the BTS Silom Line at Talat Phlu station, the future MRT Purple Line (Phase 2) southern extension and link with the MRT Blue Line extension at Tha Phra station. If the Phase 3 extension is built, the total route distance would be 39.9 km. In September 2019, it was announced that the monorail would be built as two disconnected sections and could be ready by 2023.

A possible Phase 2 extension would extend from Sukhumvit Rd., along Rama IV Rd., and Ratchadaphisek - Rama 3 Rd and end at The Rama IX Bridge at the Chao Praya river and service the Sathupradit area in Yan Nawa District. The Phase 2 extension would result in a route that is approximately 26 km long. It would also essentially replace much of the Bangkok BRT route.

A planned Phase 3 extension from The Rama IX Bridge /Rama 3 rd and would continue along Ratchadapisek rd to link with the BTS Silom Line at Talat Phlu station, the future MRT Purple Line (Phase 2) southern extension and eventually terminate with the MRT Blue Line extension at Tha Phra station. A Phase 3 expansion would result in a total distance for the Grey Line of 39.9 km.

== Stations ==
The route has a total of 15 planned stations. A number of station working names were changed by the Department of Rail Transport in August 2022 to better reflect localities of the stations.

For the potential Phase 2 & 3 sections, 25 stations are proposed. (Note: The Bangkok BRT would be replaced along this section) .

Code	Station Name	District	Transfers
Watcharaphon - Thong Lo
GY01	Vacharaphol		MRT Vacharaphol
GY02	Yu Yen		
GY03	Pradit Manutham 27		MRT (design phase)
GY04	Pradit Manutham 25		
GY05	Yothin Phatthana		
GY06	Pradit Manutham 15		
GY07	Sangkhom Songkhro		
GY08	Lat Phrao 71		MRT Lat Phrao 71
GY09	Si Wara		
GY10	Medical Development Center		
GY11	Wat Phra Ram 9		MRT (Under construction) Wat Phra Ram 9
GY12	Petchaburi 47		SRT (planned)
GY13	Cham Chan		
GY14	Charoensuk		
GY15	Thong Lo		BTS Thong Lo
Potential Phase 2 & 3 South Section (Phra Khanong - Tha Phra)
GY16	Phra Khanong		BTS Sukhumvit Line: Phra Khanong
GY17	Ban Kluai Tai		
GY18	Kluai Nam Thai		
GY19	Yaek Kasem Rat		
GY20	Queen Sirikit National Conventional Centre		MRT Blue Line: Queen Sirikit National Conventional Centre
GY21	Khlong Toei		MRT Blue Line: Khlong Toei
GY22	Ngam Du Phli		
GY23	Lumphini		MRT Blue Line: Lumphini
GY24	Suan Phlu		
GY25	Chong Nonsi		BTS Silom Line: Chong Nonsi
GY26	Thungmahamek		
GY27	Rajamangala University of Technology Krungthep		
GY28	Nang Linchi		
GY29	Ratchada-Narathiwat		
GY30	Yannawa		
GY31	Phra Ram 3		
GY32	Khlong Phum		
GY33	Khlong Dan		
GY34	Sathupradit		
GY35	Rama IX Bridge		
GY36	Charoenrat		
GY37	Bang Ko Laem		
GY38	Mahaisawan		MRT Purple Line: Samre (Under construction)
GY39	Talat Phlu		BTS Silom Line: Talat Phlu
GY40	Tha Phra		MRT Blue Line: Tha Phra

== Network map ==
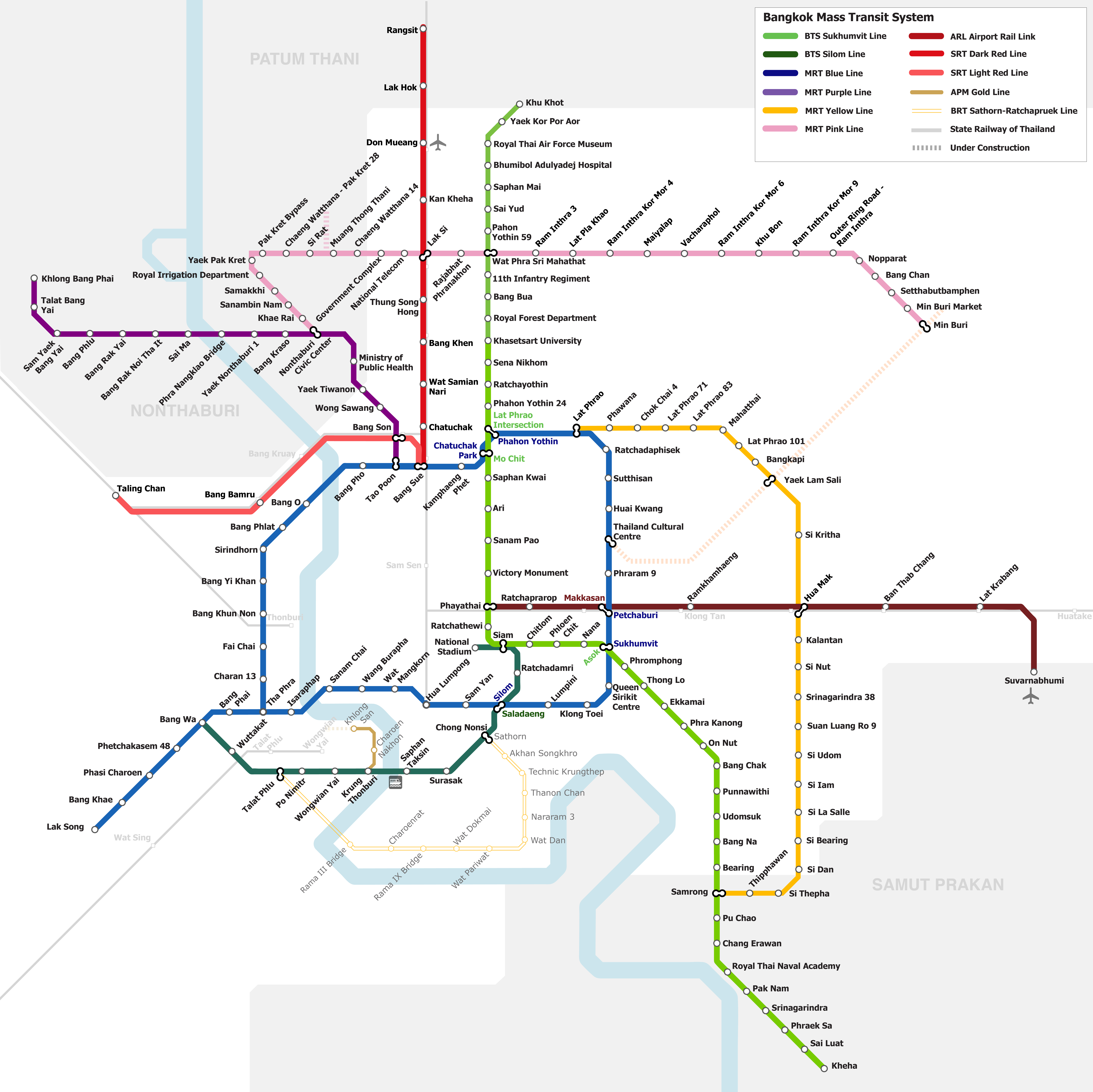

== See also ==
- Mass Rapid Transit Master Plan in Bangkok Metropolitan Region
- MRT (Bangkok)
- MRT Blue Line
- MRT Brown Line
- MRT Light Blue Line
- MRT Orange Line
- MRT Pink Line
- MRT Purple Line
- MRT Yellow Line
- BTS Skytrain
- BTS Sukhumvit Line
- BTS Silom Line
- Airport Rail Link (Bangkok)
- SRT Light Red Line
- SRT Dark Red Line
- Bangkok BRT
- BMA Gold Line
- BMA Bang Na-Suvarnabhumi Line
