= Mass Rapid Transit Master Plan in Bangkok Metropolitan Region =

Thai urban rail transit system

Bangkok Mass Rapid Transit System

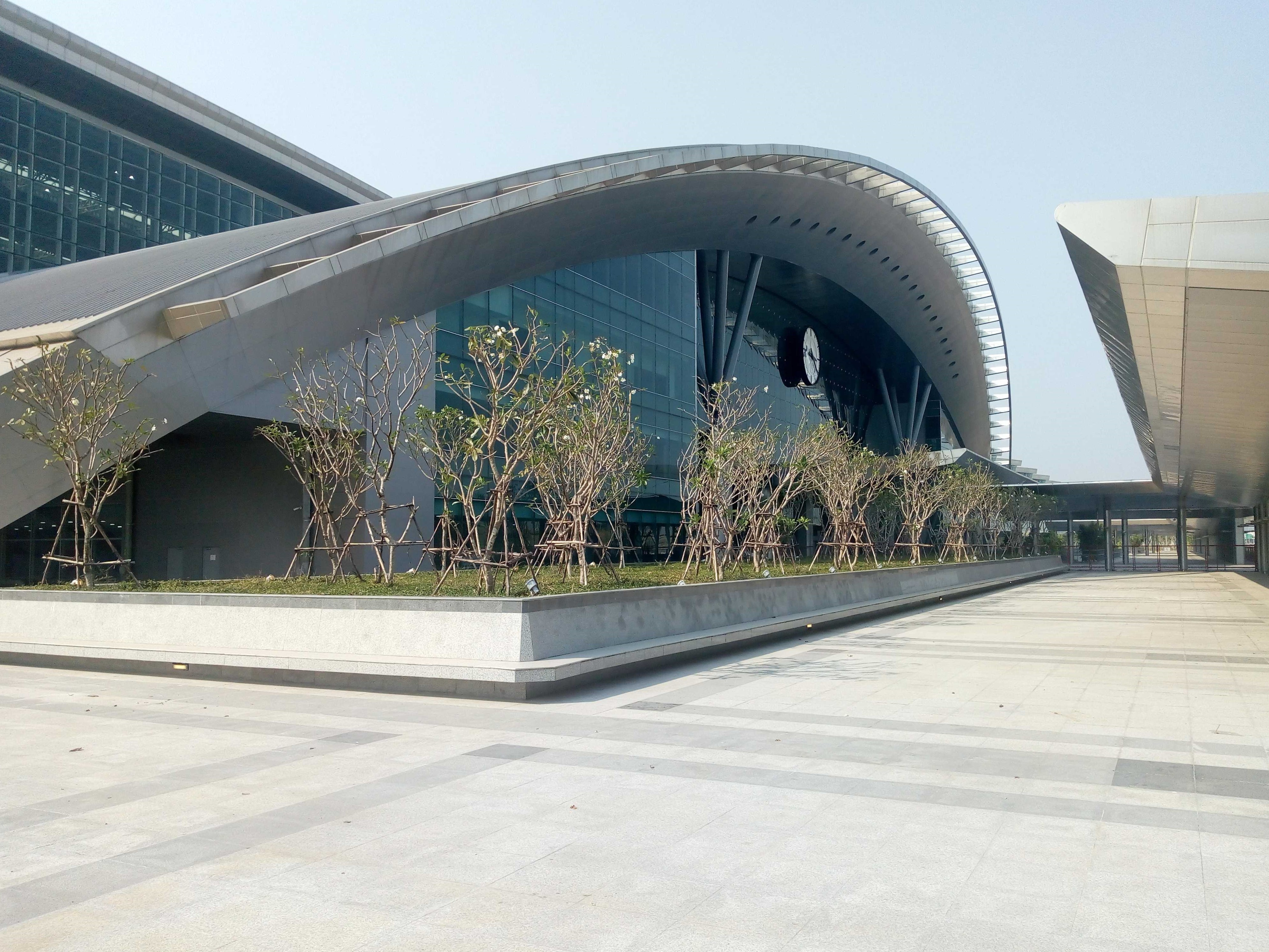
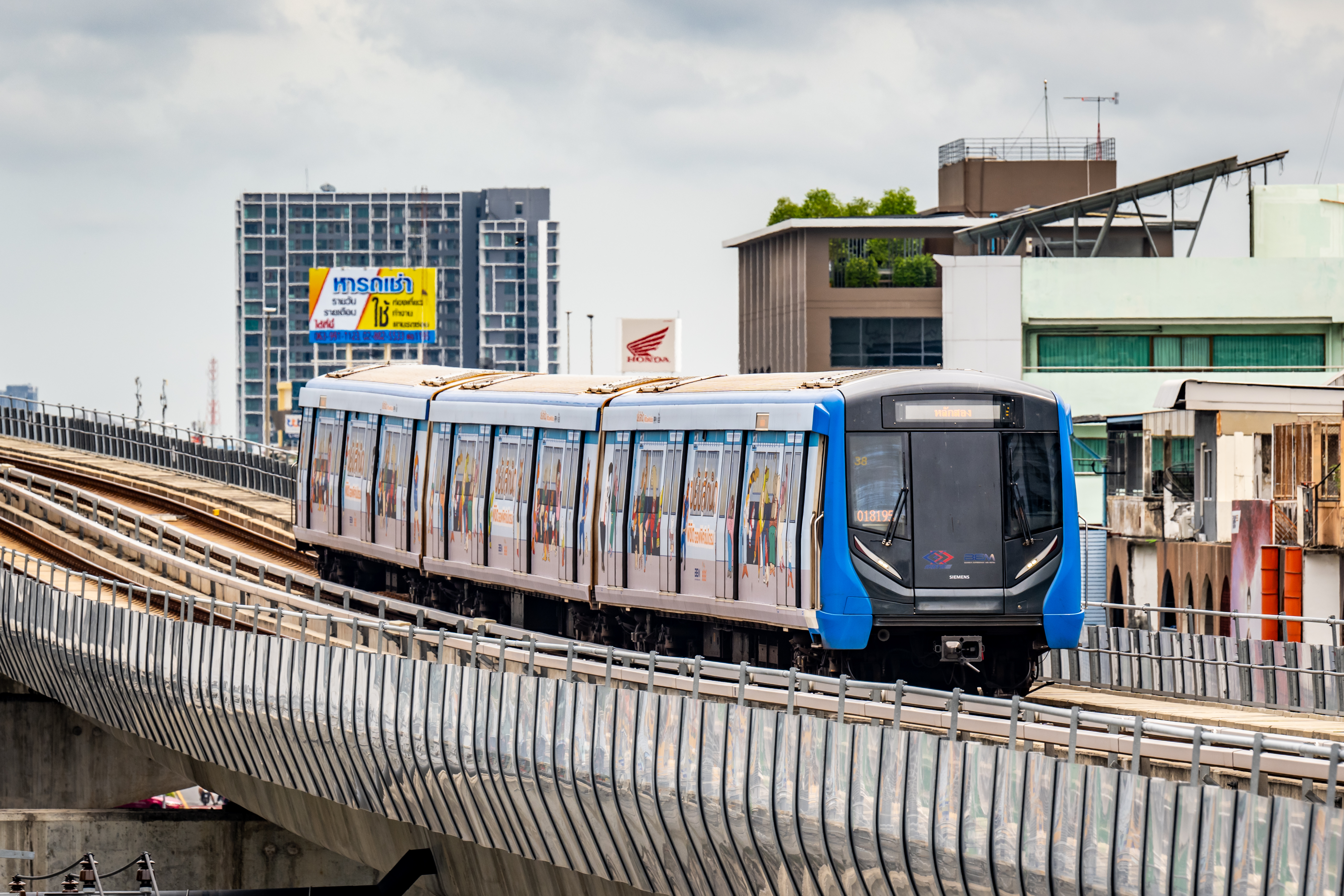
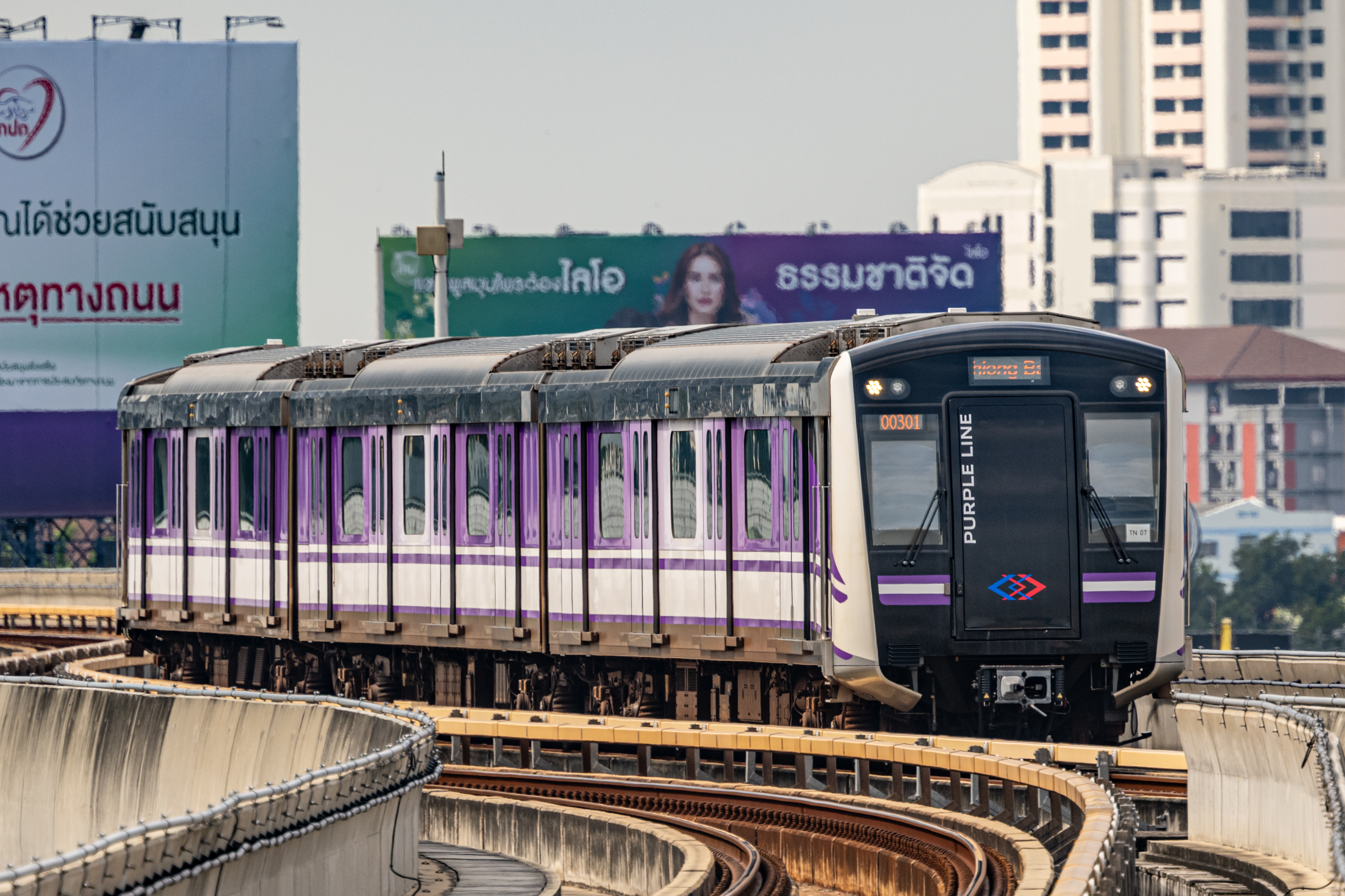
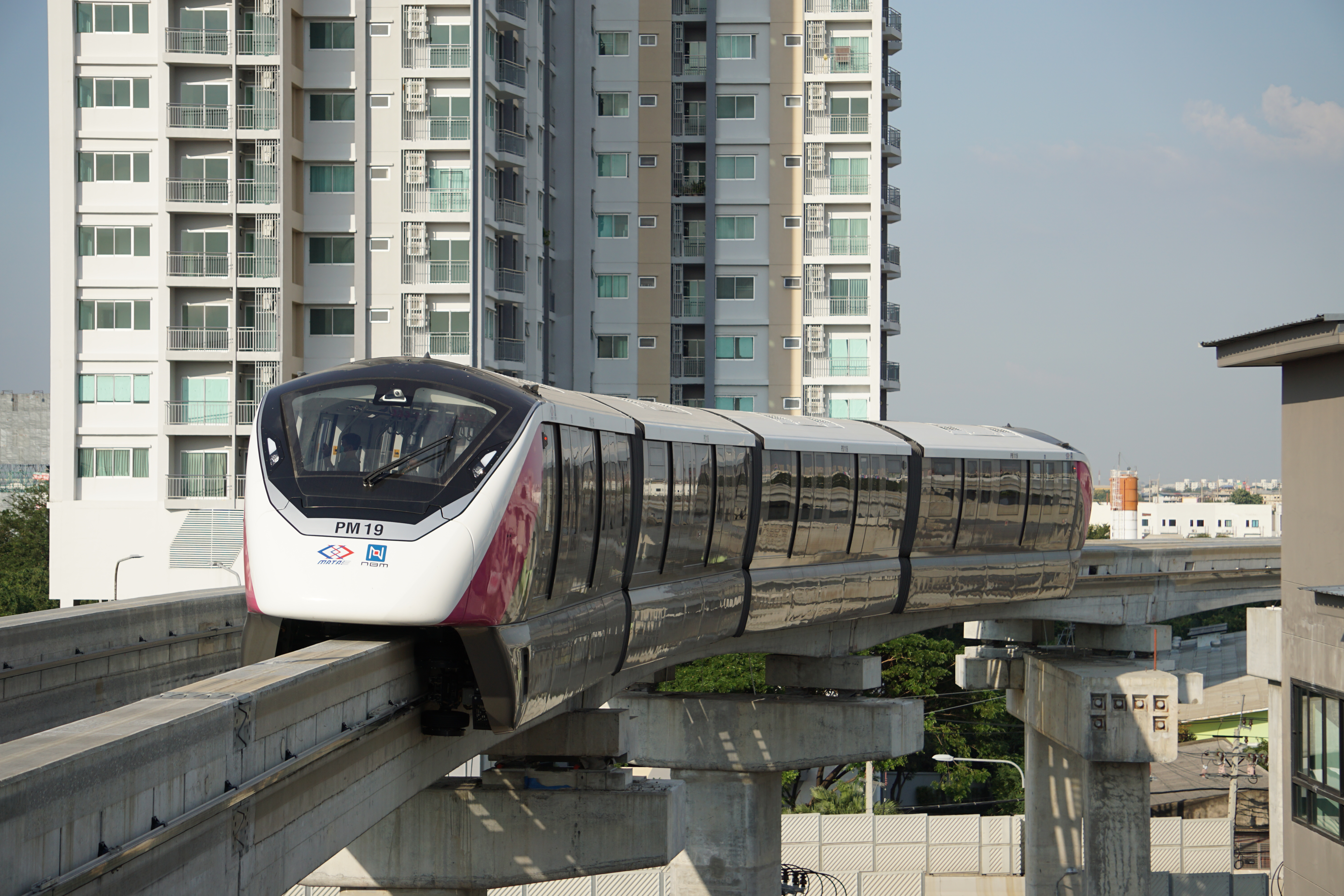
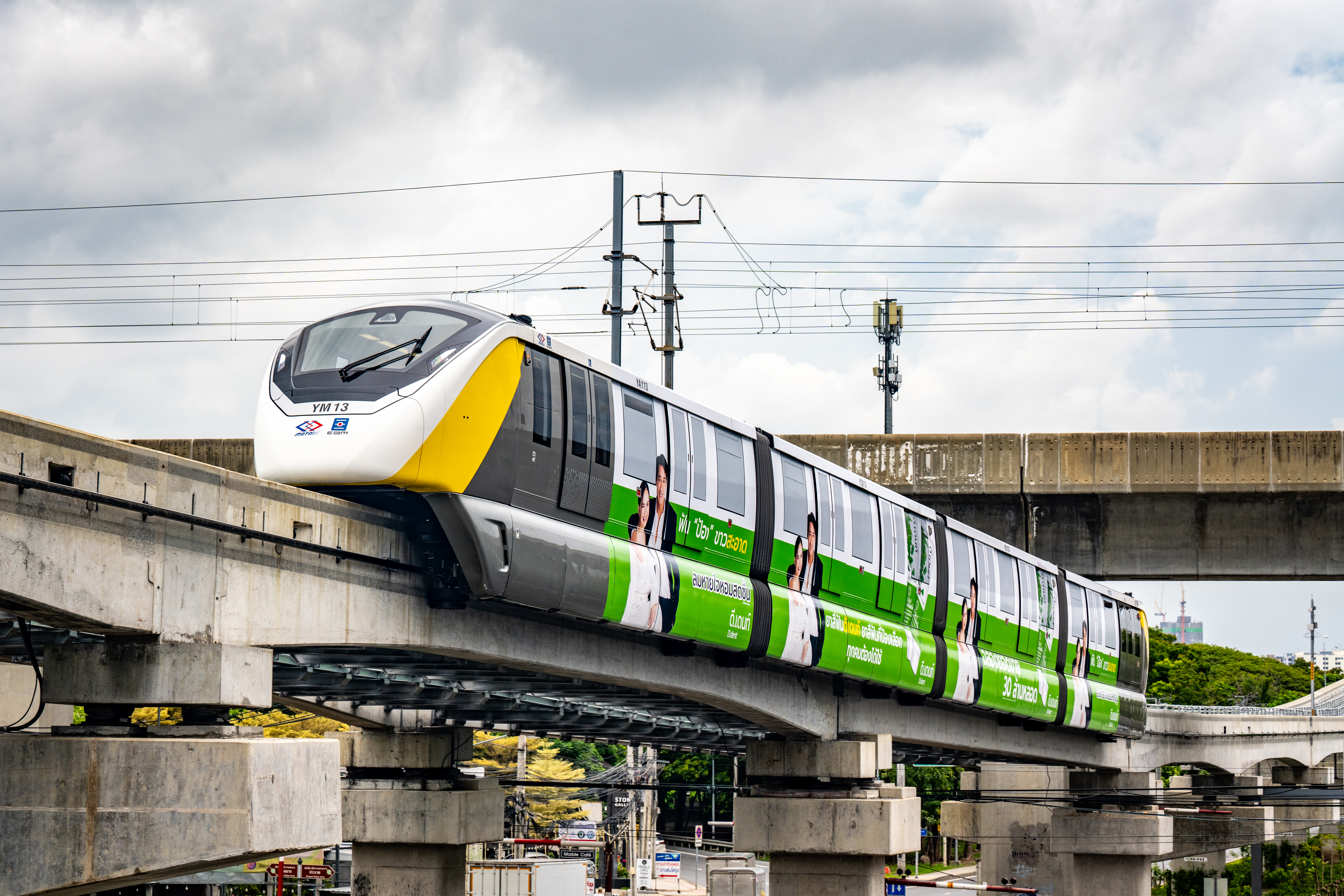
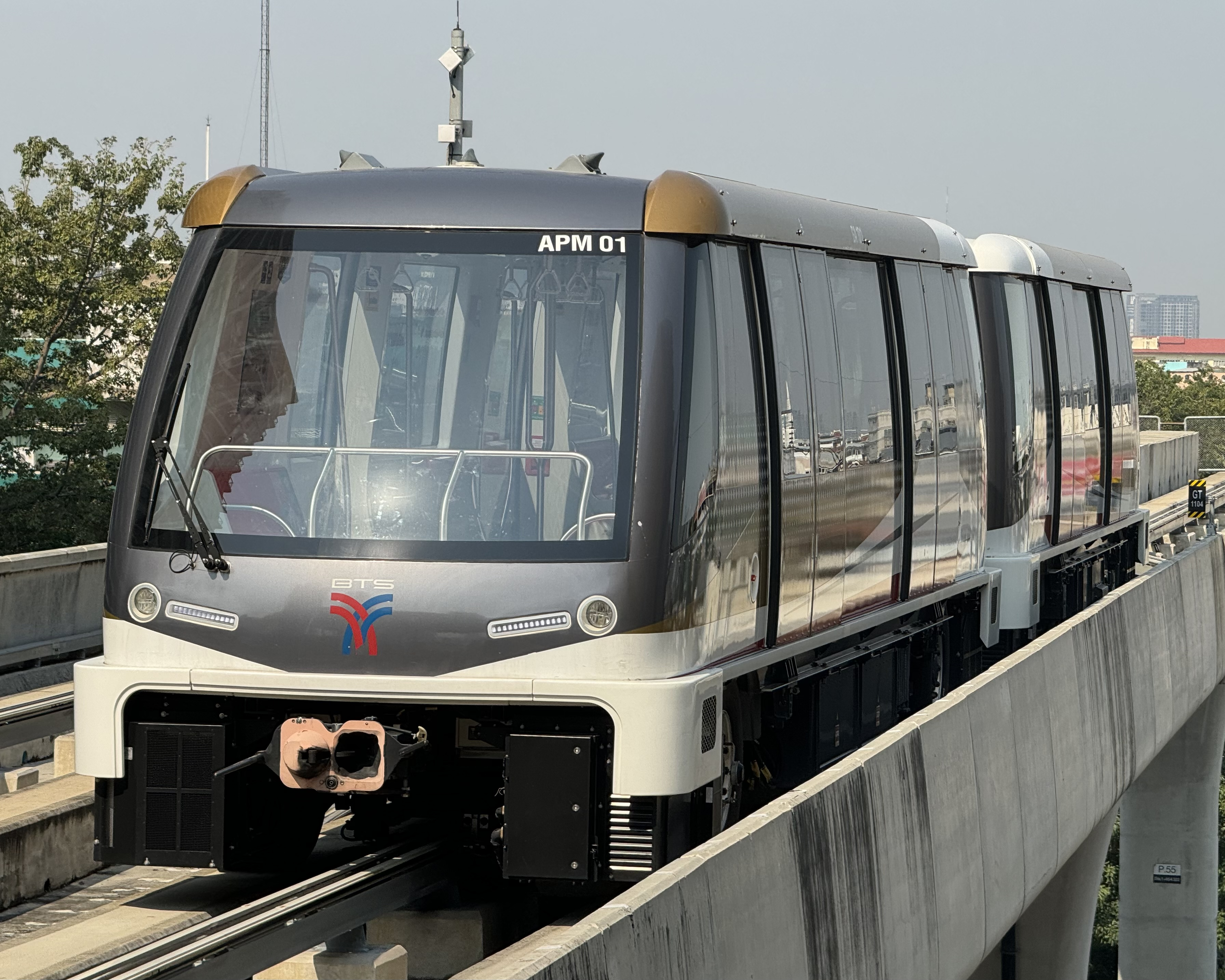
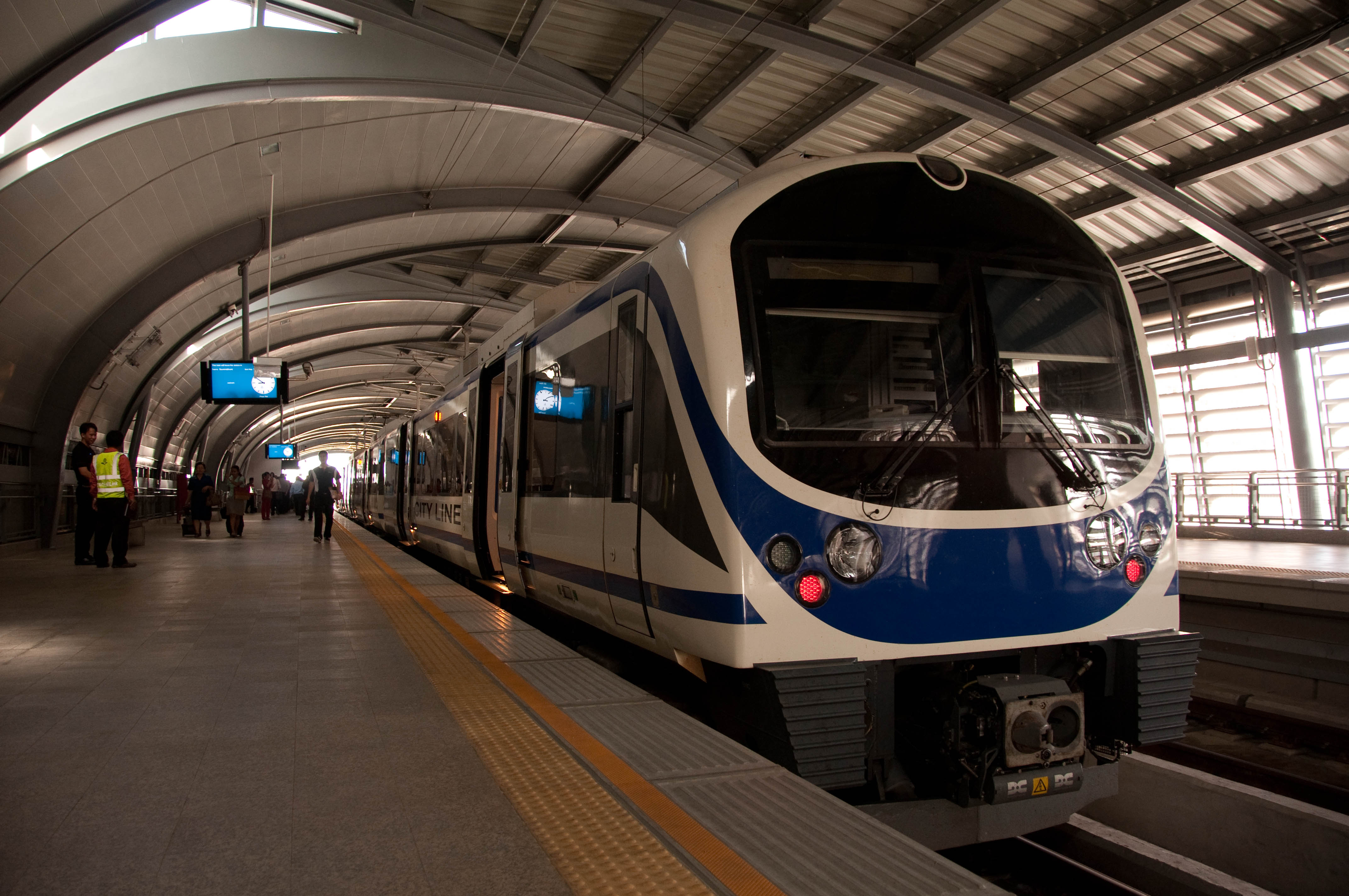
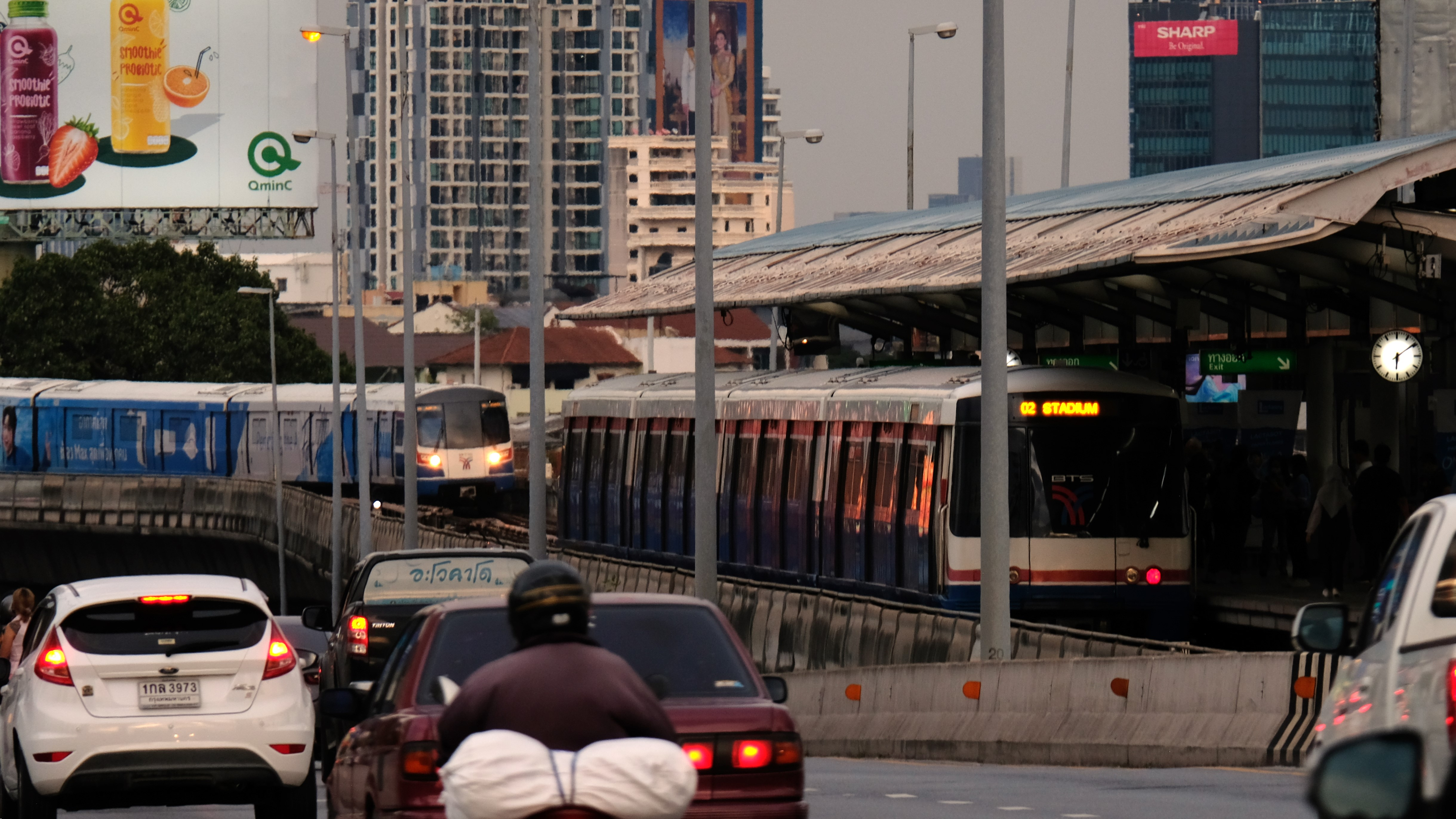

Overview
- Owner: BMA; MRTA; SRT
- Locale: Bangkok Metropolitan Region
- Transit type: Commuter rail • SRT • SRT; Airport rail link • ARL; Rapid transit • BTS • BTS • MRT • MRT (under expansion) • MRT (under construction); Light rail • Silver Line (planned); Monorail • MRT • MRT (planned) • MRT • MRL (planned) • MRL (planned); People Mover • BTS
- Number of lines: 10 lines (out of 15 total planned)
- Number of stations: 193 out of planned 310
- Daily ridership: 1,408,431 (2024)
- Annual ridership: 515,485,410 (2024)

Operation
- Began operation: 5 December 1999
- Operators: S.R.T. Electrified Train • SRT • SRT; Asia Era One • ARL; Bangkok Mass Transit System • BTS • BTS • MRT • MRT • BTS; Bangkok Expressway and Metro • MRT • MRT • MRT

Technical
- System length: 279.64 km (174 mi)
- Track gauge: MRT, BTS and Airport Rail Link: 1,435 mm (4 ft 8 1/2 in) standard gauge SRT Red Lines: 1,000 mm (3 ft 3 3/8 in) metre gauge
- Electrification: MRT and BTS: 750 V DC third rail ARL and SRT: 25 kV 50 Hz AC overhead catenary
- Top speed: MRT and BTS: 80 km/h (50 mph); ARL and SRT: 160 km/h (99 mph)

The Mass Rapid Transit Master Plan in Bangkok Metropolitan Region, or M-Map, is the latest version in a series of Thai government plans for the development of an urban rail transit network serving the Greater Bangkok area. It was drafted under the care of the Office of Transport and Traffic Policy and Planning (OTP) of the Ministry of Transport.

== History ==
=== Lavalin Skytrain ===
Lavalin Skytrain project map

Lavalin Skytrain Project is the earliest mass rapid transit plan of Bangkok to solve the traffic congestion in Bangkok during the 1970s. The project feasibility study was conducted by Thai Government with the association from West Germany Government in 1971 which led to establishment of Expressway Authority of Thailand under Clause 39 of the Announcement of the Revolutionary Council Decree 290 dated 27 November 1972 (B.E.2515) to responsible for planning and construction of expressway and mass rapid transit projects.

In 1979, the master plan compiled by Japanese advisers would have consisted of the First Stage Urban Mass Transit Lines such as the first line known as the Rama IV line, a 25-km route between Phrakhanong and Mo Chit, while the second line, the Sathon line, a 20-km route would connect Wongwian Yai and Lad Phrao, and the third line, the Memorial Line, a 16-km route that connects Dao Khanong and Makkasan, and the expected numbers of passengers were expected to be 200,000 passengers a day in 1990. The rolling stock would have utilized six heavy rail cars running at 15 minutes per train for non-rush hour and four minutes during rush hour, compared with current trains running at 6–8 minutes per train during non-rush hour and 3–5 minutes per train during rush hour, using three heavy rail cars. The project was meant to have a cost of $1100 million.

The finalised version of the project consisted of three light rail transit lines which are Sathorn Line, Rama IV Line, and Saphan Phut Line, with the depot located in Huai Khwang district (current location of Phra Ram 9 depot of MRT Blue Line). The project was expected to begin in 1981 and be completed in 1986. However, due to the 1979 oil crisis, Lavalin Skytrain project was shelved as the estimated costs were doubled.

The project was revised under the government of General Prem Tinsulanonda in 1984 and entered the bidding process with three participating companies being Asia-Euro Consortium (comprising AEG, Siemens, MAN, and Ateliers de Constructions Electriques de Charleroi), SNC-Lavalin, and Franco-Japanese Consortium. The project was awarded to SNC-Lavalin, and the contracts for a 30-year operating concession and construction were signed in May 1990 at Queen Sirikit National Convention Centre.

However, after two years of construction, In June 1992, The project was terminated by the government of Anand Panyarachun . The government stated that SNC-Lavalin failed to sign a shareholders agreement by a specified and the Thai government refused requests for overseas loan and investment guarantees. Outside of Thailand, numerous international media sources suggested politics played in its demise.

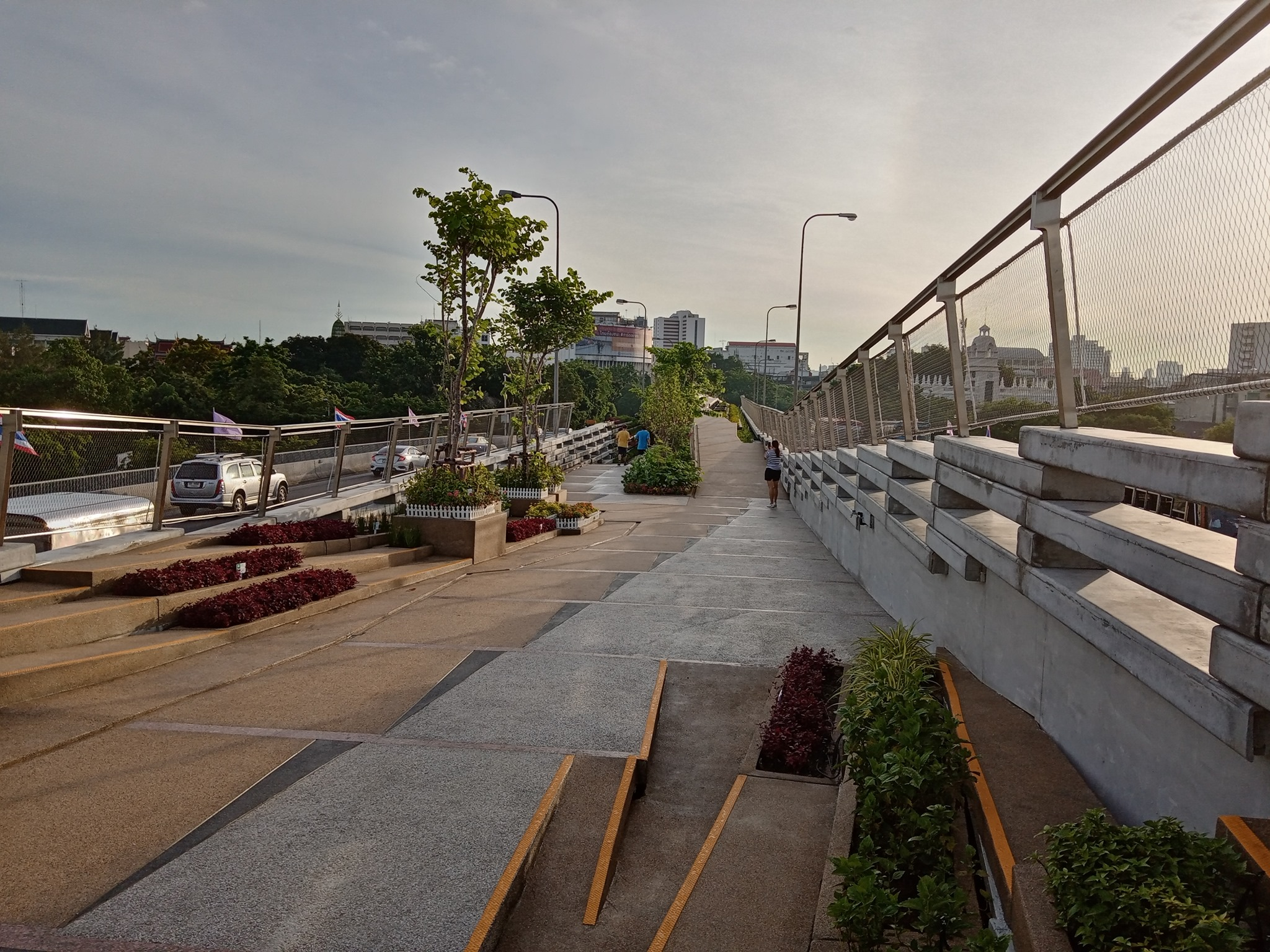
The abandoned viaduct in the middle of the Phra Pok Klao Bridge now serves as the Chao Phraya Sky Park.

Today, There are two remainings from the construction of Lavalin Skytrain project: the abandoned viaduct in the middle of Phra Pok Klao Bridge (now converted into Chao Phraya Skypark), and a reserved space in the middle of Sathorn Bridge (currently used by Silom Line).

=== Master Plan ===
The concept of developing a master plan began in 1972 when the Thai government sought cooperation from the German government to jointly develop a mass transit network. Subsequently, the Cabinet passed a resolution approving the continuous study, promotion, and support for the creation of the master plan starting from 1994. The sequences of the master plan are as follows:

==== 1994: Mass Rapid Transit Systems Master Plan (MTMP) ====
The first version of the plan, endorsed by the Cabinet on 27 September 1994 and to be implemented from 1995 to 2011, consisted of an extension of 135 kilometres (84 mi) to the three systems already in progress ( MRT , BTS , BTS and the BERTS), which would have had a combined length of 135 kilometres (84 mi) The plan was divided into two phases as follows:

- Phase 1 (1995-2001) consisted of MRT Blue Line northwestern and western extensions, BTS Skytrain north and southeastern extensions, and the Orange Line running in an east-west and north-south direction. The total length of this phase is 71.4 kilometres (44.4 mi).
- Phase 2 (2001-2011) consisted of MRT Purple Line phases 1 and 2, BERTS eastern extension and east-west section, and MRT Orange Line eastern and southeastern extensions. The overall length of this phase is 63.6 kilometres (39.5 mi).

Later, in 1996, the Office of Transport and Traffic Policy and Planning (OTP) revised this master plan and renamed it the Comprehensive Transport Master Plan (CTMP), which included an additional 178.9 kilometres (111.2 mi) of routes. This revised master plan included monorail and light rapid transit lines to enhance Bangkok into a rail transportation metropolis. The plan consisted of 11 railway projects with a combined length of 206 kilometres (128 mi), as follows;

Line Name	Section	Route	Length (km)	Replacement
Rapid Transit
BERTS	R-1	Yommarat - Bangkok Noi - Taling Chan	14.3 km (8.9 mi)	MRT (Yommarat - Taling Chan)
BERTS	R-2	Hua Lamphong - Wongwian Yai - Pho Nimit	16.9 km (10.5 mi)	SRT (Hua Lamphong - Eastern Outer Ring Road)
BERTS	R-2	Pho Nimit - Eastern Outer Ring Road	16.9 km (10.5 mi)	SRT (Hua Lamphong - Eastern Outer Ring Road)
BERTS	R-3	Hua Mak - Suvarnabhumi Airport North Terminal	13.6 km (8.5 mi)	ARL
BTS Skytrain	G-1	On Nut - Suvarnabhumi Airport South Terminal	21.4 km (13.3 mi)	Silver Line; Reserved structure can be seen between Udom Suk and Bang Na stations.
BTS Skytrain	G-2	Mo Chit - Ratchayothin	3.4 km (2.1 mi)	
BTS Skytrain	G-3	Saphan Taksin - Wongwian Yai	2.7 km (1.7 mi)	
BTS Skytrain	G-4	Bang Na - Samrong	5.9 km (3.7 mi)	
Blue Line	B-1	Bang Sue - Phra Nangklao Bridge	11 km (6.8 mi)	MRT (Phra Nangklao Bridge - Tao Poon)
Blue Line	B-2	Hua Lamphong - Bangkok Yai - Bang Khae	13 km (8.1 mi)	
Orange Line	ON	Bang Kapi - Phan Fa	20.9 km (13.0 mi)	
Orange Line	OS	Phan Fa - Rat Burana - Samrong Tai	22.8 km (14.2 mi)	MRT (Democracy Monument - Kru Nai)
Orange Line	OE	Bang Kapi - Min Buri	11.8 km (7.3 mi)	
Purple Line	PN	Tao Poon - Pak Kret	16 km (9.9 mi)	
Purple Line	PS	Tao Poon - Sam Sen	5.2 km (3.2 mi)	
Feeder Lines
		Bang Bua Thong - Taling Chan	N/A	MRT (Khlong Bang Phai - Sam Yaek Bang Yai)
		Sam Yaek Bang Yai - Phra Nangklao Bridge	N/A	MRT (Sam Yaek Bang Yai - Phra Nangklao Bridge)
		Rama VII Bridge - Dao Khanong	N/A	MRT (Bang O - Tha Phra); MRL (Tha Phra - Talat Phlu)
		Rat Burana - Phutthabucha	N/A	
		Rat Burana - Bang Mod	N/A	
		Hua Lamphong - Rama III Loop	N/A	MRL (Rama III Bridge - Chong Nonsi)
		Samrong - Si Samrong	N/A	
		Ratchayothin -Si Iam	N/A	MRT (Lat Phrao - Si Iam)
		Ramkhamhaeng - On Nut	N/A	
		Pak Kret - Min Buri	N/A	MRT ( Yaek Pakkret - Min Buri)
		On Nut - Pattanakarn	N/A	
		Ratchayothin - Min Buri	N/A	
		Lam Luk Ka - Pracha Uthit	N/A	BTS (Khu Khot - Eastern Ring Road-Lam Luk Ka)
		Vatcharaphol - Pracha Uthit	N/A	MRL (Watcharaphol - Pracha Uthit)
		Nuan Chan - Bang Kapi	N/A	MRT (Nuan Chan - Yaek Lam Sali)

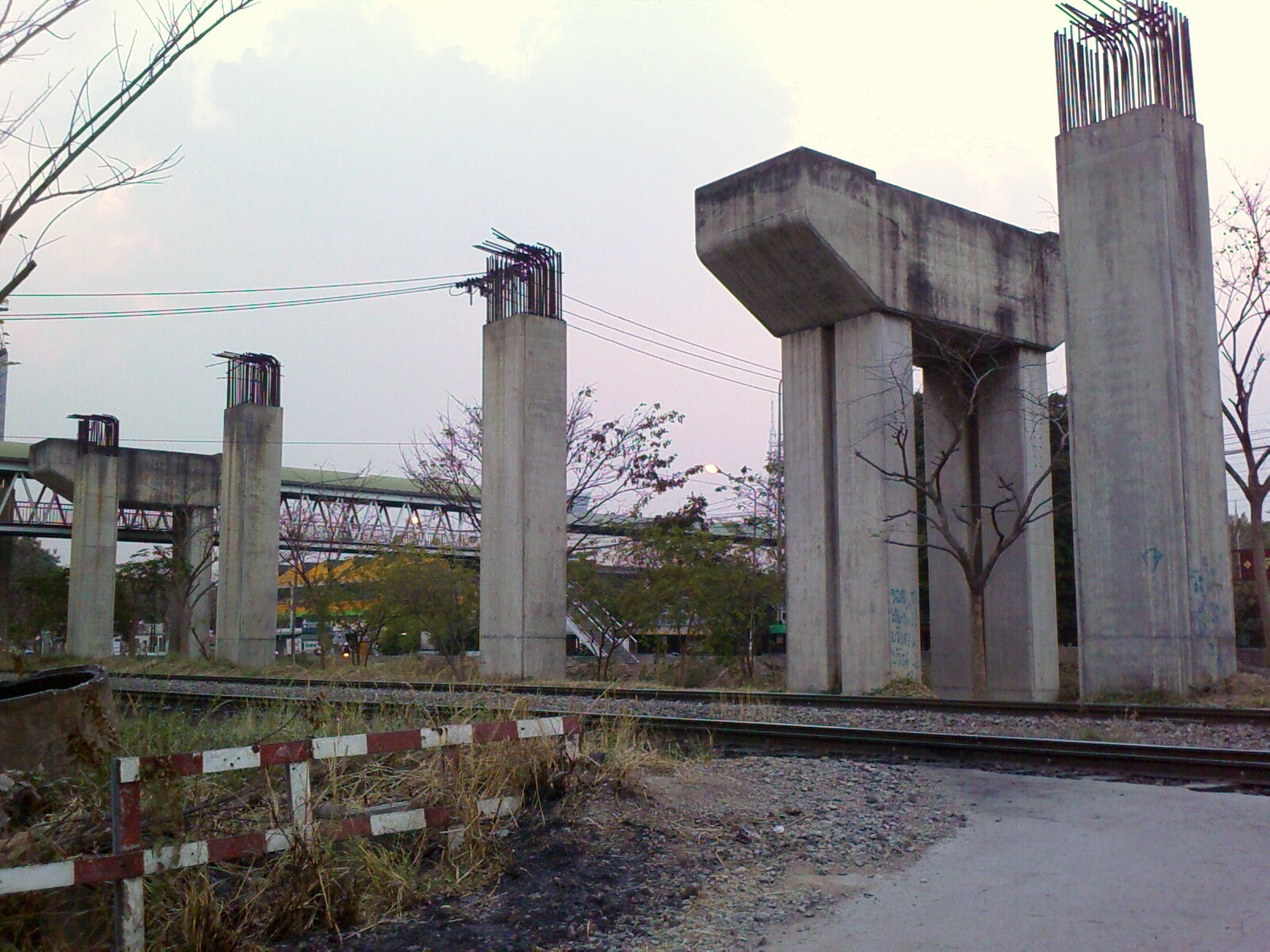
Abandoned pillars of the unfinished BERTS project.

==== 2000: Urban Rail Transportation Master Plan in Bangkok and Surrounding Areas (URMAP) ====
Following the 1997 Asian Financial Crisis and the cancellation of the BERTS, in 1998, the Cabinet passed a resolution stating that the Office of Transport and Traffic Policy and Planning (OTP) should conduct a feasibility study for a new master plan to replace the CTMP due to the development not progressing as planned and because Thailand was in the process of recovering from the economic crisis. The main objective of this new master plan is to emphasise the distribution of urban growth from the city centre to suburban areas, promoting more decentralised urban development along major roads.

The new master plan has been adapted with several projects modifying routes from the CTMP, emphasising distribution to various areas as follows:

- BERTS has been canceled and replaced by the SRT Red Lines.
- MRT became the Circle Line, with the Tao Poon to Tha Phra and Tha Phra to Queen Sirikit National Convention Centre via Rama III Road sections added.
- Ratchayothin to Si Iam Line was extended to Si Samrong and merged with the Samrong to Si Samrong Line, becoming the Yellow Line. The line will be divided into two phases: Phase 1 will run from Lat Phrao to Pattanakarn, and Phase 2 will extend from Pattanakarn to Samrong.
- Lam Luk Ka to Pracha Uthit Line became a part of the BTS Skytrain, with four extensions added: the North Extension consisted of two projects, namely Mo Chit to Saphan Mai and Saphan Mai to Khu Khot; the South Extension included On Nut to Bearing and Bearing to Samut Prakan; the Western Extension ran from National Stadium to Phran Nok; and the Southwestern Extension from Saphan Taksin to Wongwian Yai and Wongwian Yai to Bang Wa. The On Nut to Suvarnabhumi Airport South Terminal section was canceled.

==== 2004: Bangkok Mass Transit Master Plan (BMT) ====
This master plan is a conversion of the URMAP master plan into practical implementation based on government policies, which stipulate that projects in the previous master plan must be completed within 6 years (2004 – 2009). This period coincides with the recovery of the economy from the crisis in 1997. The master plan outlines a mass transit network in areas anticipated to experience continuous and increasing land use in the future. It specifies the construction of one railway station every 2 kilometres in the city areas and every 1 to 1.5 kilometres in suburban areas, aiming for the rapid transit project to be a guiding initiative for future urban development.

This master plan consists of 7 rapid transit lines with an additional 291.2 kilometres (180.9 mi) added to the existing 43.7 kilometres (27.2 mi). These lines are categorised into three groups as follows;

- Loop direction
  - MRT (Ratchadaphisek - Charan Sanitwong Circle Line): Tha Phra to Queen Sirikit National Convention Centre via Rama III Road section was cancelled.
- North - South direction
  - SRT (Rangsit to Mahachai)
  - BTS (Saphan Mai to Bang Wa)
  - MRT (Bang Yai to Rat Burana): This route combines the B-1 section of the Blue Line and the OS section of the Orange Line from the original master plan.
- East - West direction
  - SRT (Taling Chan to Suvarnabhumi Airport)
  - BTS (Phran Nok to Samut Prakan)
  - MRT (Bang Bamru to Bang Kapi): With the OS section merged into the Purple Line, the route was altered to terminate at Bang Bamru Station instead, connecting with the Light Red Line.

==== 2006 Master plan ====
In 2006, the Cabinet revised the previous BMT master plan with the aim of expanding coverage to more areas in Bangkok. Three routes were added to this master plan, as follows:

- MRT (Lat Phrao to Samrong): This line was included in the URMAP plan but was removed from the BMT plan.
- MRT (Khae Rai to Suwinthawong): This line was included in the CTMP plan but was removed from the URMAP plan.
- MRT (Bang Kapi to Min Buri)

==== 2008: M-Map ====
In 2008, the government revised the master plan for the rapid transit network once again, focusing on urban expansion and increasing transit routes in suburban areas, taking into account the growing urbanisation projected for the future. This revision resulted in a total of 9 lines with a combined length of 311 kilometres (193 mi). The revised routes are as follows:

- BTS was extended from Saphan Mai to Eastern Ring Road-Lam Luk Ka with the new extension from Km.25 to Rangsit.
- BTS was extended from Samut Prakan to Bang Pu, while the National Stadium to Phran Nok section has been shortened to Yot Se.
- MRT was extended from Rat Burana to Chulachomklao Fort.
- MRT was extended from Bang Khae to Phutthamonthon Sai 4 with two drafted future extensions which are Lat Phrao to Bang O and Tha Phra to Queen Sirikit National Convention Centre via Rama III Road sections.
- ARL has been added.
- SRT was shortened to Hua Mak.
- MRT has been upgraded to the Outer Circle Line, divided into several sections as follows;
  - Southeastern section (Samrong to Pattanakarn)
  - Northeastern section (Pattanakarn to Khae Rai)
  - Northwestern section (Khae Rai to Bang Wa)
  - Southwestern section (Bang Wa to Samrong)

==== 2010: M-Map Revision ====
In 2009, the government revised the M-Map, this time considering urban expansion and the distribution of development to suburban areas, guided by the rapid transit projects. This revised M-Map includes the study of a total of 12 transit lines, with a combined length of 509 kilometres (316 mi) , consisting of 8 main lines and 4 feeder lines, as follows:

Line Name	Route	Notes
Main Line
Dark Red Line	Thammasart University (Rangsit Campus) - Mahachai	
Light Red Line	Salaya - Hua Mak	Extended from Taling Chan to Salaya.
Light Red Line	Taling Chan - Makkasan	
Airport Rail Link	Don Mueang - Suvarnabhumi Airport	
Light Green Line	Eastern Ring Road-Lam Luk Ka - Bang Pu	
Dark Green Line	Yot Se - Bang Wa	
Blue Line	Phutthamonthon - Hua Lamphong - Bang Sue - Tha Phra	
Purple Line	Bang Yai - Rat Burana	
Orange Line	Taling Chan - Min Buri	The line was altered from Bang Bamru to Taling Chan, passing through Pratunam, and the Brown Line (Bang Kapi - Min Buri) has been merged.
Feeder Line
Pink Line	Khae Rai - Min Buri	
Yellow Line	Lat Phrao - Samrong	The line was downgraded from the Outer Circle Line, with the northwestern and southwestern sections being removed from the master plan.
Grey Line	Vatcharaphol - Rama IX Bridge	This line was formed by the Wacharaphol to Pracha Uthit Line from the CTMP master plan to terminate at Rama IX Bridge.
Light Blue Line	Din Daeng - Sathorn	This line was designed to support the opening of the new Bangkok Metropolitan Administration building and to enhance connectivity in the Sathorn district.

This master plan has been implemented for the development of actual projects since 2011. Currently, over 70% of the plan has been completed. However, with the unsuitability of certain routes, the master plan has been revised. This revision includes cancellations, modifications, and suspensions of 5 routes as follows

- SRT : Taling Chan to Makkasan section was shortened to Taling Chan-Siriraj.
- ARL : Became the part of Don Mueang–Suvarnabhumi–U-Tapao high-speed railway.
- MRT : The route was shortened to Bang Khun Non due to overlapping routes with SRT Light Red Line from Taling Chan to Bang Khun Non
- MRL : Cancelled as it is not part of the 4-year expedited plan.
- MRL : Cancelled for the same reason as the Grey Line.

As a result, the rapid transit network in Bangkok and its surrounding areas now consists of 10 lines.

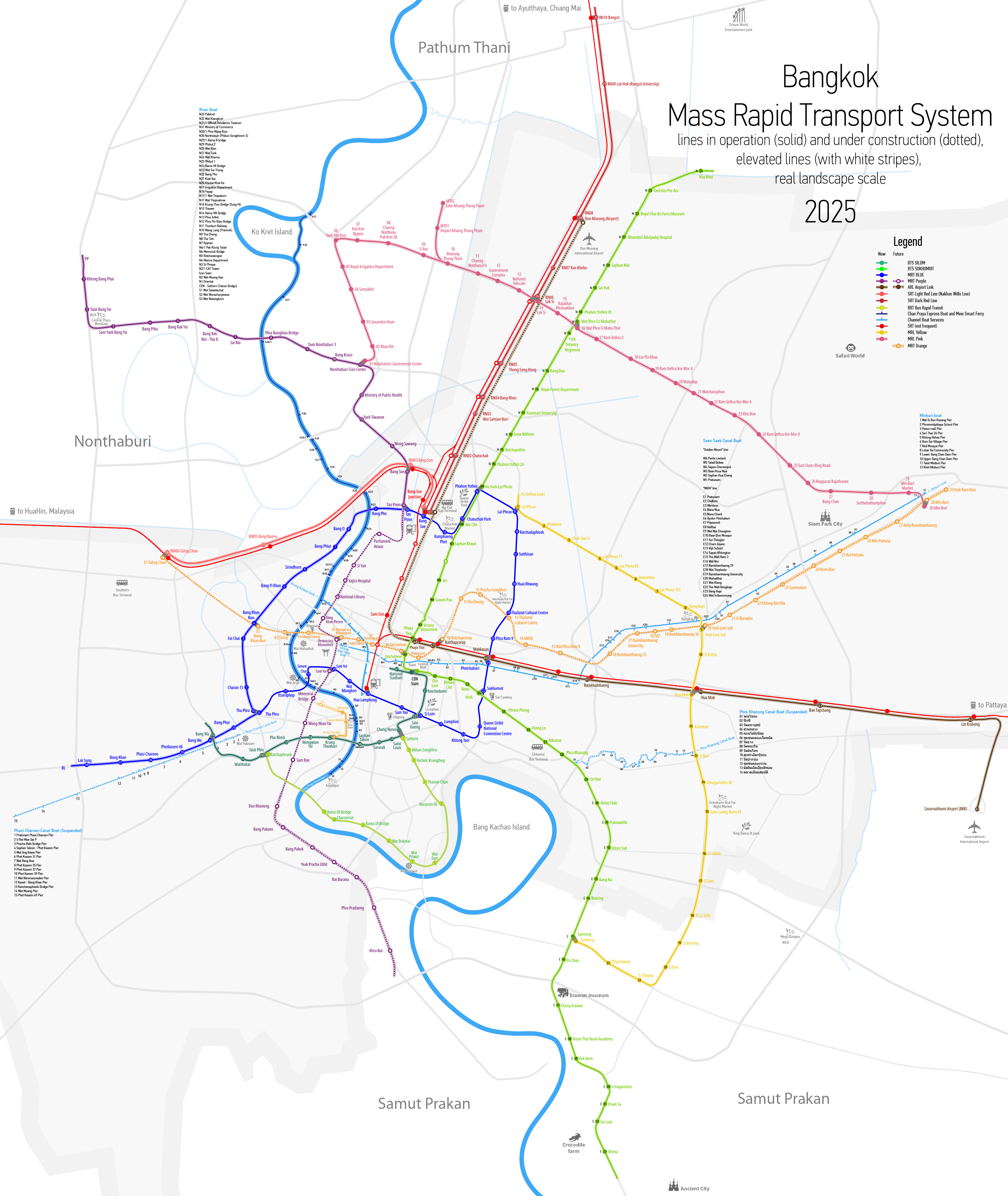
The M-Map details plans for additional rapid transit lines in Bangkok Metropolitan Region.

==== 2024: M-Map 2 ====
To accommodate the expansion of the city into the suburban areas, in March 2017, the Cabinet assigned the Ministry of Transport and the Office of Transport and Traffic Policy and Planning (OTP) to study an additional 10 transit lines. These lines were to be included in the M-Map Phase 2. The study was to be conducted in collaboration with the Japan International Cooperation Agency (JICA) to plan and support the necessary budget for investment, should there be a need to secure foreign loans for the project.

The second phase of the M-Map 2 focuses on developing feeder lines to support urban expansion and feed passengers into Bangkok's main transit routes, which include the BTS , BTS , MRT , MRT , SRT , SRT , and ARL . Initially, the Office of Transport and Traffic Policy and Planning (OTP) considered incorporating routes that had not yet been implemented, were under study, were outside the master plan, or had been canceled from the previous master plan. Four pilot routes were identified. Additionally, the Mass Rapid Transit Authority of Thailand (MRTA) proposed 8 new lines to be included in the master plan, resulting in a total of 11 initial routes.

Subsequently, the OTP, in collaboration with the Japan International Cooperation Agency (JICA), revealed the details of the draft master plan for the M-Map 2, which was approved by JICA. This draft included 5 new lines totaling 131 kilometres (81 mi), both as extensions of existing lines and as new lines. However, due to changing circumstances, the Department of Rail Transport (the current status of the OTP) reconsidered the entire M-Map 2. They proposed a new long-term plan (Project Long List) consisting of 29 lines, which will be submitted to the Cabinet for approval as the actual master plan in the future.

On July 25, 2023, the Department of Rail Transport officially announced the draft of the M-Map 2. This new master plan will be submitted to the Cabinet for official approval in 2024, with the goal of expediting the commencement of all projects within 20 years, by 2042. The master plan is divided into three main categories as follows

Line Name	Route	Notes
Group 1: Extensions for the existing line
Light Green Line	Khu Khot to Eastern Ring Road-Lam Luk Ka	Both routes are from the previous master plan that was not completed. MRTA has temporarily halted these plans until there is clarity on passenger guarantees.
Light Green Line	Kheha to Tamru	Both routes are from the previous master plan that was not completed. MRTA has temporarily halted these plans until there is clarity on passenger guarantees.
Dark Green Line	National Stadium to Yot Se	
Dark Green Line	Bang Wa to Bang Rak Noi Tha It	This is a new route proposed by JICA for the Bang Wa to Lam Sali Line. However, since MRTA has developed the Nonthaburi Civic Center to Yaek Lam Sali section as the Brown Line, the Department of Rail Transport has considered changing the missing section between Bang Wa and Nonthaburi Civic Center into an extension of the Silom Line, terminating at Bang Rak Noi Tha It instead.
Blue Line	Lak Song to Phutthamonthon Sai 4	The route is from the previous master plan that was not completed. MRTA has temporarily halted these plans until there is clarity on passenger guarantees.
Dark Red Line	Rangsit to Thammasart University (Rangsit Campus)	These routes have been approved but are currently not yet implemented.
Dark Red Line	Bang Sue to Hua Lamphong	These routes have been approved but are currently not yet implemented.
Dark Red Line	Wongwian Yai to Mahachai	These routes have been approved but are currently not yet implemented.
Dark Red Line	Hua Lamphong to Mahachai	These routes have been approved but are currently not yet implemented.
Light Red Line	Taling Chan to Salaya	These routes have been approved but are currently not yet implemented.
Light Red Line	Taling Chan to Siriraj	These routes have been approved but are currently not yet implemented.
Airport Rail Link	Lat Krabang to Chachoengsao	The proposed route by the Department of Rail Transport, which cancels the Light Red Line from Bang Sue to Hua Mak to Chachoengsao. Instead, it will utilize part of the infrastructure from the Don Mueang–Suvarnabhumi–U-Tapao high-speed railway to add new stations for the Airport Rail Link City Line, expanding travel areas and replacing the entire eastern segment of the Light Red Line
Gold Line	Prachadhipok	BMA has temporarily halted these plans until there is clarity on passenger guarantees.
Group 2: New proposed line
Brown Line	Nonthaburi Civic Centre to Yaek Lam Sali	
Grey Line	Vatcharaphol to Thong Lo	The proposed route by the BMA, which separates the original Grey Line into distinct sections. The northern section largely follows the original plan, and the Department of Rail Transport has extended the line further to Lam Luk Ka Road
Grey Line	Vatcharaphol to Khlong Si	The proposed route by the BMA, which separates the original Grey Line into distinct sections. The northern section largely follows the original plan, and the Department of Rail Transport has extended the line further to Lam Luk Ka Road
Grey Line	Phra Khanong to Rama III	The proposed route by the BMA will replace the existing Bangkok BRT.
Grey Line	Rama III to Tha Phra	The proposed route by the BMA will replace the existing Bangkok BRT.
Light Blue Line	Sathorn to Din Daeng	This route has been revived after has been removed from the original M-Map.
Silver Line	Bang Na to Suvarnabhumi Airport	The proposed route by the BMA, which separates the extension of the Light Green Line from Udom Suk to Suvarnabhumi Airport for independent development
Group 3: Feeder Line
	Lat Phrao to Nonthaburi Pier	Most of these routes focus on feeding passengers into the main transit system and may be proposed to operate as regular buses, bus rapid transit, trams, or may be considered as extensions of connectable routes.
	Don Mueang to Si Saman	Most of these routes focus on feeding passengers into the main transit system and may be proposed to operate as regular buses, bus rapid transit, trams, or may be considered as extensions of connectable routes.
	Salaya to Mahachai	Most of these routes focus on feeding passengers into the main transit system and may be proposed to operate as regular buses, bus rapid transit, trams, or may be considered as extensions of connectable routes.
	Srinagarindra to Bang Bo	Most of these routes focus on feeding passengers into the main transit system and may be proposed to operate as regular buses, bus rapid transit, trams, or may be considered as extensions of connectable routes.
	Khlong Hok to Ongkharak	Most of these routes focus on feeding passengers into the main transit system and may be proposed to operate as regular buses, bus rapid transit, trams, or may be considered as extensions of connectable routes.
	Rattanathibet to Yaek Pak Kret	Most of these routes focus on feeding passengers into the main transit system and may be proposed to operate as regular buses, bus rapid transit, trams, or may be considered as extensions of connectable routes.
	Khlong San to Siriraj	Most of these routes focus on feeding passengers into the main transit system and may be proposed to operate as regular buses, bus rapid transit, trams, or may be considered as extensions of connectable routes.
	Bang Sue to Rama III	Most of these routes focus on feeding passengers into the main transit system and may be proposed to operate as regular buses, bus rapid transit, trams, or may be considered as extensions of connectable routes.
	Ratchaprhuek to Khae Rai	Most of these routes focus on feeding passengers into the main transit system and may be proposed to operate as regular buses, bus rapid transit, trams, or may be considered as extensions of connectable routes.
	Phra Khanong to Srinagarindra	Most of these routes focus on feeding passengers into the main transit system and may be proposed to operate as regular buses, bus rapid transit, trams, or may be considered as extensions of connectable routes.
	Bang Sue to Pathum Thani	Most of these routes focus on feeding passengers into the main transit system and may be proposed to operate as regular buses, bus rapid transit, trams, or may be considered as extensions of connectable routes.
	Mueang Thong Thani to Pathum Thani	Most of these routes focus on feeding passengers into the main transit system and may be proposed to operate as regular buses, bus rapid transit, trams, or may be considered as extensions of connectable routes.
	Bang Khae to Samrong	Most of these routes focus on feeding passengers into the main transit system and may be proposed to operate as regular buses, bus rapid transit, trams, or may be considered as extensions of connectable routes.
	Phraek Sa to Tamru	Most of these routes focus on feeding passengers into the main transit system and may be proposed to operate as regular buses, bus rapid transit, trams, or may be considered as extensions of connectable routes.
	Thammasart University (Rangsit Campus) to Nawanakhon	Most of these routes focus on feeding passengers into the main transit system and may be proposed to operate as regular buses, bus rapid transit, trams, or may be considered as extensions of connectable routes.
	Bang Na to Chong Nonsi	Most of these routes focus on feeding passengers into the main transit system and may be proposed to operate as regular buses, bus rapid transit, trams, or may be considered as extensions of connectable routes.
	Suvarnabhumi Airport to Bang Bo	Most of these routes focus on feeding passengers into the main transit system and may be proposed to operate as regular buses, bus rapid transit, trams, or may be considered as extensions of connectable routes.
	Borommaratchachonnani to Lak Si	Most of these routes focus on feeding passengers into the main transit system and may be proposed to operate as regular buses, bus rapid transit, trams, or may be considered as extensions of connectable routes.
	Thanyaburi to Thammasart University (Rangsit Campus)	Most of these routes focus on feeding passengers into the main transit system and may be proposed to operate as regular buses, bus rapid transit, trams, or may be considered as extensions of connectable routes.
	Khlong Sam to Khu Khot	Most of these routes focus on feeding passengers into the main transit system and may be proposed to operate as regular buses, bus rapid transit, trams, or may be considered as extensions of connectable routes.
	Min Buri to Suvarnabhumi Airport	Most of these routes focus on feeding passengers into the main transit system and may be proposed to operate as regular buses, bus rapid transit, trams, or may be considered as extensions of connectable routes.
	Debaratna to Samut Prakan	Most of these routes focus on feeding passengers into the main transit system and may be proposed to operate as regular buses, bus rapid transit, trams, or may be considered as extensions of connectable routes.
	Bang Yai to Bang Bua Thong	Most of these routes focus on feeding passengers into the main transit system and may be proposed to operate as regular buses, bus rapid transit, trams, or may be considered as extensions of connectable routes.
	Kru Nai to Samut Prakan	Most of these routes focus on feeding passengers into the main transit system and may be proposed to operate as regular buses, bus rapid transit, trams, or may be considered as extensions of connectable routes.
	Pathum Thani to Thanyaburi	Most of these routes focus on feeding passengers into the main transit system and may be proposed to operate as regular buses, bus rapid transit, trams, or may be considered as extensions of connectable routes.

== Overview ==
Line Name	Commencement	Last extension	Next extension	Terminus		Length (km)	Stations	Track Gauge	Depot	Power Supply	Owner	Operator(s)	Average Daily Passengers (๋2025)
Commuter rail
Dark Red Line	29 November 2021; 4 years ago (Note: Krung Thep Aphiwat - Rangsit & Krung Thep Aphiwat - Taling Chan)	-	January 2028; 1 year's time (Note: Rangsit - Thammasat University (Rangsit Campus))	Krung Thep Aphiwat Central Terminal	Rangsit	26 km (16 mi)	10	1,000 mm (3 ft 3 3/8 in)	• Bang Sue	25 kV AC 50 Hz, overhead line	State Railway of Thailand	S.R.T. Electrified Train	36,261
Light Red Line	29 November 2021; 4 years ago	-	May 2028; 1 year's time	Krung Thep Aphiwat Central Terminal	Taling Chan	15 km (9.3 mi)	4	1,000 mm (3 ft 3 3/8 in)	• Bang Sue	25 kV AC 50 Hz, overhead line	State Railway of Thailand	S.R.T. Electrified Train	36,261
Airport rail link
Airport Rail Link	23 August 2010; 16 years ago (Note: Phaya Thai - Suvarnabhumi)	-	TBA	Phaya Thai	Suvarnabhumi	28.47 km (17.69 mi)	8	1,435 mm (4 ft 8 1/2 in)	• Khlong Tan	25 kV AC 50 Hz, overhead line	State Railway of Thailand	Previous: S.R.T. Electrified Train; Current: Asia Era One	67,129
Rapid Transit
Sukhumvit Line	5 December 1999; 26 years ago (Note: Mo Chit - On Nut & National Stadium - Saphan Taksin)	16 December 2020; 5 years ago (Note: Wat Phra Si Mahathat - Khu Khot)	TBA	Khu Khot	Kheha	54.25 km (33.71 mi)	47	1,435 mm (4 ft 8 1/2 in)	• Khu Khot • Bang Pu	750 V DC, Third Rail	Bangkok Metropolitan Administration	Bangkok Mass Transit System	716,069
Sukhumvit Line	5 December 1999; 26 years ago	16 December 2020; 5 years ago	TBA	Khu Khot	Kheha	54.25 km (33.71 mi)	47	1,435 mm (4 ft 8 1/2 in)	• Mo Chit	750 V DC, Third Rail	Bangkok Metropolitan Administration	Bangkok Mass Transit System	716,069
Silom Line	5 December 1999; 26 years ago	8 February 2021; 5 years ago (Note: Saint Louis station)	TBA	National Stadium	Bang Wa	14.00 km (8.70 mi)	14	1,435 mm (4 ft 8 1/2 in)	• Mo Chit	750 V DC, Third Rail	Bangkok Metropolitan Administration	Bangkok Mass Transit System	716,069
Silom Line	5 December 1999; 26 years ago	8 February 2021; 5 years ago	TBA	National Stadium	Bang Wa	14.00 km (8.70 mi)	14	1,435 mm (4 ft 8 1/2 in)	• Bang Wa sub-depot	750 V DC, Third Rail	Bangkok Metropolitan Administration	Bangkok Mass Transit System	716,069
Blue Line	3 July 2004; 22 years ago (Note: Bang Sue - Hua Lamphong)	23 December 2019; 6 years ago (Note: Sirindhorn - Tha Phra)	TBA	Tha Phra	Lak Song	48.00 km (29.83 mi)	38	1,435 mm (4 ft 8 1/2 in)	• Huai Khwang • Phetkasem	750 V DC, Third Rail	Mass Rapid Transit Authority of Thailand	Bangkok Expressway and Metro	428,614
Purple Line	6 August 2016; 10 years ago (Note: Khlong Bang Phai - Tao Poon)	-	2029; 3 years' time (Note: Tao Poon - Kru Nai)	Khlong Bang Phai	Tao Poon	23.00 km (14.29 mi)	16	1,435 mm (4 ft 8 1/2 in)	• Khlong Bang Phai • Kru Nai (under construction)	750 V DC, Third Rail	Mass Rapid Transit Authority of Thailand	Bangkok Expressway and Metro	68,492
Monorail
Pink Line	21 November 2023; 2 years ago (Note: Nonthaburi Civic Centre - Min Buri) (Note: Trial run. Officially open on 1 February 2024; 2 years ago)	16 June 2025; 17 months ago (Note: Mueang Thong Thani - Lake Muang Thong Thani)	-	Nonthaburi Civic Center	Min Buri	37.30 km (23.18 mi)	32	-	• Min Buri	750 V DC, Third Rail	Mass Rapid Transit Authority of Thailand	Bangkok Mass Transit System	61,702
Pink Line	21 November 2023; 2 years ago	16 June 2025; 17 months ago	-	Muang Thong Thani	Lake Muang Thong Thani	37.30 km (23.18 mi)	32	-	• Min Buri	750 V DC, Third Rail	Mass Rapid Transit Authority of Thailand	Bangkok Mass Transit System	61,702
Yellow Line	3 June 2023; 3 years ago (Note: Hua Mak - Samrong)	19 June 2023; 3 years ago (Note: Phawana - Lat Phrao)	-	Lat Phrao	Samrong	30.40 km (18.89 mi)	23	-	• Si Udom	750 V DC, Third Rail	Mass Rapid Transit Authority of Thailand	Bangkok Mass Transit System	45,250
People Mover
Gold Line	16 December 2020; 5 years ago (Note: Krung Thon Buri - Khlong San)	-	TBA	Krung Thon Buri	Khlong San	1.80 km (1.12 mi)	3	1,435 mm (4 ft 8 1/2 in)	• Krung Thon Buri	750 V DC, Third Rail	Bangkok Metropolitan Administration	Bangkok Mass Transit System	7,461
Total						278.8 km (173.2 mi)	193 (Note: Counted paid-to-paid area interchange station only once)						1,426,006

== Current future plans ==
Line Name	Name	Planned opening date	Terminus		Length (km)	Stations	Status	Owner
Commuter rail
Dark Red Line	Thammasat University (Rangsit Campus) to Ban Pachi Junction Section	TBA	Thammasart University (Rangsit Campus)	Ban Pachi Junction	≈22 km (14 mi)	9	Planning	State Railway of Thailand
Dark Red Line	Hua Lamphong to Mahachai Section	TBA	Hua Lamphong	Mahachai	34.76 km (21.60 mi)	20	Project reevaluated	State Railway of Thailand
Dark Red Line	Mahachai to Pak Tho Section	TBA	Mahachai	Pak Tho	≈78 km (48 mi)	17	Planning	State Railway of Thailand
Dark Red Line	Rangsit to Thammasat University (Rangsit Campus) Section	2029; 3 years' time	Rangsit	Thammasart University (Rangsit Campus)	10.3 km (6.4 mi)	4	Construction is scheduled to start in 15 July 2026.	State Railway of Thailand
Dark Red Line	Missing Link Section	TBA	Krung Thep Aphiwat Central Terminal	Hua Lamphong	7.71 km (4.79 mi)	5	Approved by SRT executive board.	State Railway of Thailand
Light Red Line	Missing Link Section	TBA	Krung Thep Aphiwat Central Terminal	Hua Mak	18.2 km (11.3 mi)	5	Approved by SRT executive board.	State Railway of Thailand
Light Red Line	Taling Chan to Salaya Section with two additional stations; Rama 6 and EGAT stations	2029; 3 years' time	Taling Chan	Salaya	12.64 km (7.85 mi)	6	Construction is scheduled to start in 15 July 2026.	State Railway of Thailand
Light Red Line	Taling Chan to Siriraj Section	2029; 3 years' time	Taling Chan	Siriraj	5.86 km (3.64 mi)	3	Construction is scheduled to start in 15 July 2026.	State Railway of Thailand
Light Red Line	Hua Mak to Chachoengsao Section	TBA	Hua Mak	Chachoengsao	≈40 km (25 mi)	10	Planning	State Railway of Thailand
Light Red Line	Salaya to Nakhon Pathom Section	TBA	Salaya	Nakhon Pathom	≈29 km (18 mi)	6	Planning	State Railway of Thailand
Light Red Line	Ractchaprarop to Mae Nam Section	TBA	Ratchaprarop	Mae Nam	≈6 km (3.7 mi)	3	Planning	State Railway of Thailand
Airport rail link
Airport Rail Link	Don Mueang–Suvarnabhumi–U-Tapao high-speed railway (Phaya Thai to Don Mueang section)	TBA	Phaya Thai	Don Mueang	20.31 km (12.62 mi)	2	Approved	State Railway of Thailand
Rapid Transit
Sukhumvit Line	Lam Luk Ka Extension	TBA	Khu Khot	Eastern Ring Road Lam Luk Ka	7.8 km (4.8 mi)	4	Postponed	Mass Rapid Transit Authority of Thailand
Sukhumvit Line	Tamru Extension	TBA	Kheha	Tamru	10.1 km (6.3 mi)	4	Postponed	Mass Rapid Transit Authority of Thailand
Sukhumvit Line	Infill station between Ari and Saphan Khwai stations	TBA	Sena Ruam		-	1	Postponed	Bangkok Metropolitan Administration
Silom Line	Yot Se Extension	TBA	National Stadium	Yot Se	1.2 km (0.75 mi)	1	Planning	Bangkok Metropolitan Administration
Silom Line	Taling Chan Extension	TBA	Bang Wa	Taling Chan	7.94 km (4.93 mi)	6	Planning	Bangkok Metropolitan Administration
Silom Line	Taling Chan to Bang Rak Noi Thai It Section	TBA	Taling Chan	Bang Rak Noi Tha It	8.60 km (5.34 mi)	7	Planning	Bangkok Metropolitan Administration
Blue Line	Putthamonthon Sai 4 Extension	TBA	Lak Song	Putthamonthon Sai 4	8.3 km (5.2 mi)	4	Postponed	Mass Rapid Transit Authority of Thailand
Purple Line	MRT Purple Line Southern Section	2029; 3 years' time	Tao Poon	Khru Nai	22.78 km (14.15 mi)	17	Under construction	Mass Rapid Transit Authority of Thailand
Orange Line	MRT Orange Line Eastern Section	2027; 1 year's time	Thailand Cultural Centre	Yaek Rom Klao	21 km (13 mi)	17	Under construction	Mass Rapid Transit Authority of Thailand
Orange Line	MRT Orange Line Western Section	2030; 4 years' time	Bang Khun Non	Thailand Cultural Centre	13.1 km (8.1 mi)	11	Under construction	Mass Rapid Transit Authority of Thailand
Orange Line	Bang Khun Non to Taling Chan Section	TBA	Taling Chan	Bang Khun Non	4.4 km (2.7 mi)	1	Approved	Mass Rapid Transit Authority of Thailand
Light Rapid Transit
Silver Line	Bang Na - Suvarnabhumi light rail project	TBA	Bang Na	Suvarnabhumi Airport South Terminal	≈20 km (12 mi)	14	Postponed	Mass Rapid Transit Authority of Thailand
Monorail
Brown Line	MRT Brown Line	2030; 4 years' time	Nonthaburi Civic Center	Yaek Lam Sali	21 km (13 mi)	20	Approved	Mass Rapid Transit Authority of Thailand
Yellow Line	Ratchayothin Extension	TBA	Lat Phrao	Ratchayothin	2.5 km (1.6 mi)	2	Shelved	Mass Rapid Transit Authority of Thailand
Grey Line	Grey Line Northern Section	TBA	Thong Lo	Vatcharaphol	16.25 km (10.10 mi)	15	Postponed	Mass Rapid Transit Authority of Thailand
Grey Line	Grey Line Southern Section	TBA	Phra Khanong	Tha Phra	20.2 km (12.6 mi)	24	Postponed	Mass Rapid Transit Authority of Thailand
Grey Line	Khlong Si Extension	TBA	Vatcharaphol	Khlong Si	10.87 km (6.75 mi)	5	Planning	Mass Rapid Transit Authority of Thailand
Light Blue Line	Light Blue Line project	TBA	Pracha Songkro	Chong Nonsi	9.5 km (5.9 mi)	9	Planning	Mass Rapid Transit Authority of Thailand
People Mover
Gold Line	Prachadhipok Extension	TBA	Khlong San	Prachadhipok	1.2 km (0.75 mi)	1	Postponed	Bangkok Metropolitan Administration
Total (excluding Ratchayothin extension)					≈489.02 km (303.86 mi)	227		

== Rolling Stock and signalling ==
=== Rolling stock ===
Name	Manufacturer	Family Name	Assembly	Line		Trainset statistics						Image
Name	Manufacturer	Family Name	Assembly	Line		No. of trainsets	Cars (per train)	Car length	Trainset length	Speed Limit	Service Commencement	Image
1000 Series	(Japan) Hitachi Rail	A-train	Yamaguchi, Japan	Dark; Red; Line	Light Red Line	15	6-car	N/A		Dark Red Line: 145 km/h (90 mph) Light Red Line: 120 km/h (75 mph)	29 November 2021; 4 years ago	
2000 Series	(Japan) Hitachi Rail	A-train	Yamaguchi, Japan	Dark; Red; Line	Light Red Line	10	4-car	N/A		Dark Red Line: 145 km/h (90 mph) Light Red Line: 120 km/h (75 mph)	29 November 2021; 4 years ago	
Class 360	(Germany) Siemens	Desiro	Krefeld, Germany	Airport Rail Link		5	3-car	20.34m	61.02m	145 km/h (90 mph)	23 August 2010; 16 years ago	
Class 360	(Germany) Siemens	Desiro	Krefeld, Germany	Airport Rail Link		4	4-car	20.34m	81.36m	145 km/h (90 mph)	23 August 2010; 16 years ago	
A1	(Germany) Siemens	Modular Metro	Vienna, Austria	Sukhumvit Line	Silom Line	35	4-car	21.8m (DM) 21.5m (T)	86.6m	80 km/h (50 mph)	5 December 1999; 26 years ago	
A2	(Germany) Siemens / Bozankaya	-	Ankara, Turkey	Sukhumvit Line	Silom Line	22	4-car	21.8m (DM) 21.5m (T)	86.6m	80 km/h (50 mph)	6 December 2018; 7 years ago	
B1	CRRC Changchun Railway Vehicles	-	Changchun, China	Sukhumvit Line	Silom Line	12	4-car	21.86m (DT/DM); 21.77m (T/M)	87.26m	80 km/h (50 mph)	December 2010; 15 years ago	
B2	CRRC Changchun Railway Vehicles	-	Changchun, China	Sukhumvit Line	Silom Line	5	4-car	21.86m (DT/DM); 21.77m (T/M)	87.26m	80 km/h (50 mph)	29 November 2013; 12 years ago	
B3	CRRC Changchun Railway Vehicles	-	Changchun, China	Sukhumvit Line	Silom Line	24	4-car	21.86m (DT/DM); 21.77m (T/M)	87.26m	80 km/h (50 mph)	30 November 2019; 6 years ago	
IBL (Initial Blue Line)	(Germany) Siemens	Modular Metro	Vienna, Austria	Blue Line		19	3-car	21.8m (DM); 21.5m (T)	65.1m	80 km/h (50 mph)	3 July 2004; 22 years ago	
BLE (Blue Line Extension)	(Germany) Siemens	-	Vienna, Austria	Blue Line		35	3-car	21.8m (DM); 21.5m (T)	65.1m	80 km/h (50 mph)	29 July 2019; 7 years ago	
TBA	(Germany) Siemens / Bozankaya	TBA	Ankara, Turkey	Blue Line		21	3-car	TBA		80 km/h (50 mph)	2026; 0 years ago	
TBA	(Germany) Siemens / Bozankaya	TBA	Ankara, Turkey	Orange Line		32	3-car	TBA		80 km/h (50 mph)	2026; 0 years ago	
S24	Japan Transport Engineering Company (J-TREC)	Sustina	Yokohama, Japan	Purple Line		21	3-car	21.34m (DM); 21.00m (T)	63.68m	80 km/h (50 mph)	6 August 2016; 10 years ago	
Innovia Monorail 300	(France) Alstom / CRRC Nanjing Puzhen	Innovia	Nanjing, China	Pink Line		30	4-car	13.21m (end car) 13.02m (mid car)	50.47m	80 km/h (50 mph)	21 November 2023; 2 years ago	
Innovia Monorail 300	(France) Alstom / CRRC Nanjing Puzhen	Innovia	Nanjing, China	Yellow Line		28	4-car	13.21m (end car) 13.02m (mid car)	50.47m	80 km/h (50 mph)	3 June 2023; 3 years ago	
Innovia APM 300	(France) Alstom / CRRC Nanjing Puzhen	Innovia	Nanjing, China	Gold Line		3	2-car	N/A		80 km/h (50 mph)	16 December 2020; 5 years ago	

=== Signalling ===
Line name	Supplier	Solution	Type	Commission Date	Level of Automation	Remarks
Dark Red Line	Thales	AlTrac for ERTMS	Fixed-block ETCS Level 1	2020	Semi-automatic (STO)	
Light Red Line	Thales	AlTrac for ERTMS	Fixed-block ETCS Level 1	2020	Semi-automatic (STO)	
Airport Rail Link	Siemens	Trainguard LZB700M	Fixed-block; speed coded	2009	Semi-automatic (STO)	
Sukhumvit Line	Bombardier	Cityflo 450	Moving-block CBTC	2009-2011	Semi-automatic (STO)	
Silom Line	Bombardier	Cityflo 450	Moving-block CBTC	2009-2011	Semi-automatic (STO)	
Blue Line	Siemens	Trainguard LZB700M	Fixed-block	2019	Semi-automatic (STO)	Reinstalled.
Purple Line	Bombardier	Cityflo 650	Moving-block CBTC	2016	Semi-automatic (STO)	
Pink Line	Bombardier	Cityflo 650	Moving-block CBTC	2021	Unattended (UTO)	
Yellow Line	Bombardier	Cityflo 650	Moving-block CBTC	2021	Unattended (UTO)	
Gold Line	Bombardier	Cityflo 650	Moving-block CBTC	2020	Unattended (UTO)	
Former
Sukhumvit Line	Siemens	Trainguard LZB700M	Fixed-block	1999	Semi-automatic (STO)	Decommissioned from 2009 to 2011
Silom Line	Siemens	Trainguard LZB700M	Fixed-block	1999	Semi-automatic (STO)	Decommissioned from 2009 to 2011

== Incidents and Accidents ==
=== Accidents ===
Date	Line	Accident type	Location	Damage	Aftermath/Notes
17 January 2005	Blue Line	Runaway Train	Thailand Cultural Centre station	Over 100 injuries	The line was closed for 2 weeks to send the collided train sets for maintenance at Siemens' factory in Germany and to fully restore the damaged platform.
19 June 2017	Airport Rail Link	Train collision involving pedestrian	Ban Thap Chang station	1 fatality	First fatal accident in Thailand's mass transit system.
27 June 2020	Silom Line	Train collision involving pedestrian	Saint Louis station (which was under construction at the time)	1 injury	The accident occurred as a worker entered the railway tracks before the scheduled closing time for services and before the start of the work shift.
15 January 2022	Dark Red Line	Train collision involving pedestrian	Between Wat Samian Nari and Chatuchak stations	1 fatality	
20 June 2022	Dark Red Line	Train collision involving pedestrian	500-metre away from Lak Hok station	1 fatality	
24 December 2023	Pink Line	Equipment failure	200-metre away from Samakkhi station	• 1 train • 3 cars • 1 electric pole	All stations between Nonthaburi Civic Centre and Pak Kret Bypass were closed and later reopened on 30 December.
2 January 2024	Yellow Line	Equipment failure	Between Si Thepha and Si Dan stations	1 car	Service was restored on 4 January with trains running at 15-minute intervals free of charge.
28 March 2024	Yellow Line	Equipment failure	Between Kalantan and Suan Luang Rama IX stations	• 2 cars • 1 motorcycle	Limited service was provided for 2-3 months following the accident.
5 March 2025	Light Red Line	Train collision involving pedestrian	Between Bang Bamru and Taling Chan stations	1 fatality	

=== Accidents during construction phase ===
Date	Line	Cause	Location	Damage
6 June 2013	Purple Line	Six steel beams, each 10 meters long, fell onto several cars.	Tao Poon station	• 1 injury • 4 cars
20 January 2015	Dark Red Line	Construction pier and worker scaffolding collapsed.	Lak Si station	7 injuries
4 May 2015	Dark Red Line	Crane tipped over during operation.	Don Mueang station	1 car
17 March 2017	Sukhumvit Line	Steel structure measuring 3×3 meters and weighing over 1 ton fell onto a car	Ratchayothin station	1 car
22 March 2017	Sukhumvit Line	Wet concrete fell onto a car	Outside of Bhumibol Adulyadej Hospital station	1 car
28 April 2017	Dark Red Line	A steel beam used to support concrete fell on a worker	Outside of Don Mueang station	3 fatalities
18 June 2017	Blue Line	Scaffolding steel fell down onto the street below	Outside of Bang Khun Non station	
24 December 2023	Purple Line	A steel panel from the diaphragm wall (D-Wall) fell down	Wongwian Yai station	1 fatality
30 March 2024	Pink Line	Wet concrete fell onto a car	Impact Muang Thong Thani station	1 car
12 September 2024	Purple Line	Crane tipped over during operation	Outside of Somdech Phra Pinklao Hospital station	1 injury
19 May 2025	Orange Line	Construction worker fell into an excavation hole at the Lan Luang station construction site. The body was found five days later.	Lan Luang station	1 fatality
24 September 2025	Purple Line	2025 Bangkok road collapse	Vajira Hospital station	

=== Incidents ===
Date	Line	Cause	Location	Damage
15 April 2005	Blue Line	The brake lock system engaged on its own without any known cause.	Khlong Toei station	The train wheels caused friction, resulting in a cloud of smoke.
7-15 November 2011	Blue Line	2011 Thailand floods	From Bang Sue to Ratchadaphisek stations	The flooding in Bangkok was severe, necessitating the closure of certain entry and exit points to prevent water from entering the stations and the MRT system.
26 June 2018	Airport Rail Link	Lesser adjutant was hit by a running train.	Outside of Ban Thap Chang station	The train service was temporarily suspended to replace the cabin window.
2 August 2018	Sukhumvit Line	Malfunctioning door opened during train operation.	Between Mo Chit and Saphan Khwai stations	
15 August 2018	Sukhumvit Line	Person fell onto the train tracks.	Ratchathewi station	
23 August 2018	Silom Line	Water leakage occurred within the train.	While departing from National Stadium station	The leakage was caused by water accumulation in the air conditioning unit of the train carriage.
20 September 2023	Sukhumvit Line	Malfunctioning door opened during train operation.	Between Bang Chak and Punnawithi stations	
21 May 2024	Blue Line	Water leakage occurred within the train.	While departing from Bang Sue station	The leakage was caused by water accumulation in the air conditioning unit of the train carriage.
4 July 2024	Pink Line	Train door opened while the train was not aligned with the platform.	Lat Pla Khao station	The cause of the incident was a combination of a bag being caught outside the train and a communication failure among staff.
28 March 2025	All Lines	2025 Myanmar Earthquake	All stations	All train lines suspended operations at 13.00 to monitor aftershock risks and allow engineers to inspect structural integrity. Services gradually resumed at 23.20 the same day, except the Yellow Line, which resumed two days later at 12.00, and the Pink Line, which resumed on April 1, excluding Min Buri Station. Min Buri Station reopened on April 16.

== Timeline ==
Year	Date	Line	Event	Length (km)	Station
1999	5 December	Sukhumvit Line	Mo Chit - On Nut section opened	15.9 km (9.9 mi)	17
1999	5 December	Silom Line	National Stadium - Saphan Taksin section opened	6.24 km (3.88 mi)	7
2004	3 July	Blue Line	Bang Sue - Hua Lamphong section opened	19.95 km (12.40 mi)	18
2009	15 May	Silom Line	Saphan Taksin - Wongwian Yai section opened	2.08 km (1.29 mi)	2
2010	23 August	Airport Rail Link	Phaya Thai - Suvarnabhumi section opened	28.17 km (17.50 mi)	8
2011	12 August	Sukhumvit Line	On Nut - Bearing section opened	5.34 km (3.32 mi)	5
2013	12 January	Silom Line	Wongwian Yai - Pho Nimit section opened	1.02 km (0.63 mi)	1
2013	14 February	Silom Line	Pho Nimit - Talat Phlu section opened	1.16 km (0.72 mi)	1
2013	5 December	Silom Line	Talat Phlu - Bang Wa section opened	2.5 km (1.6 mi)	2
2016	6 August	Purple Line	Khlong Bang Phai - Tao Poon section opened	20.92 km (13.00 mi)	16
2017	3 April	Sukhumvit Line	Bearing - Samrong section opened	1.78 km (1.11 mi)	1
2017	11 August	Blue Line	Bang Sue - Tao Poon section opened	1.18 km (0.73 mi)	1
2018	6 December	Sukhumvit Line	Samrong - Kheha section opened	9.95 km (6.18 mi)	8
2019	29 July	Blue Line	Hua Lamphong - Tha Phra section opened	6.16 km (3.83 mi)	5
2019	9 August	Sukhumvit Line	Mo Chit - Ha Yaek Lat Phrao section opened	1.81 km (1.12 mi)	1
2019	24 August	Blue Line	Tha Phra - Bang Wa section opened	2.12 km (1.32 mi)	2
2019	21 September	Blue Line	Bang Wa - Lak Song section opened	5.3 km (3.3 mi)	4
2019	4 December	Blue Line	Tao Poon - Sirindhorn section opened	5.16 km (3.21 mi)	4
2019	4 December	Sukhumvit Line	Ha Yaek Lat Phrao - Kasetsart University section opened	3.29 km (2.04 mi)	4
2019	23 December	Blue Line	Sirindhorn - Tha Phra section opened	7.04 km (4.37 mi)	4
2020	5 June	Sukhumvit Line	Kasetsart University - Wat Phra Si Mahathat section opened	4.24 km (2.63 mi)	4
2020	16 December	Sukhumvit Line	Wat Phra Si Mahathat - Khu Khot section opened	8.86 km (5.51 mi)	7
2021	16 January	Gold Line	Krung Thon Buri - Khlong San section opened	1.67 km (1.04 mi)	3
2021	8 February	Silom Line	Saint Louis station opened	-	1
2021	29 November	Dark Red Line	Krung Thep Aphiwat Central Terminal - Rangsit section opened	22.5 km (14.0 mi)	10
2021	29 November	Light Red Line	Krung Thep Aphiwat Central Terminal - Taling Chan section opened	14.93 km (9.28 mi)	4
2023	3 July	Yellow Line	Lat Phrao - Samrong section opened	28.62 km (17.78 mi)	23
2024	7 January	Pink Line	Nonthaburi Civic Centre - Min Buri section opened	33.9 km (21.1 mi)	30
2025	16 June	Pink Line	Muang Thong Thani - Lake Muang Thong Thani section opened	2.67 km (1.66 mi)	2
Under construction / Planned
2028	January	Dark Red Line	Rangsit - Thammasat University (Rangsit Campus) opened	10.3 km (6.4 mi)	4
2028	May	Light Red Line	Taling Chan - Salaya section opened	12.64 km (7.85 mi)	4
2028	May	Light Red Line	Taling Chan - Siriraj section Opened	5.86 km (3.64 mi)	4
2028	May	Light Red Line	Rama 6 and EGAT stations opened	-	2
2028	TBA	Orange Line	Thailand Cultural Centre - Yaek Rom Klao section opened	21.04 km (13.07 mi)	17
2029	TBA	Purple Line	Tao Poon - Khru Nai section opened	22.78 km (14.15 mi)	17
2030	TBA	Orange Line	Bang Khun Non - Thailand Cultural Centre section opened	13.2 km (8.2 mi)	11
2030	TBA	Brown Line	Nonthaburi Civic Centre - Yaek Lam Sali section opened	21 km (13 mi)	20

== Overall map ==
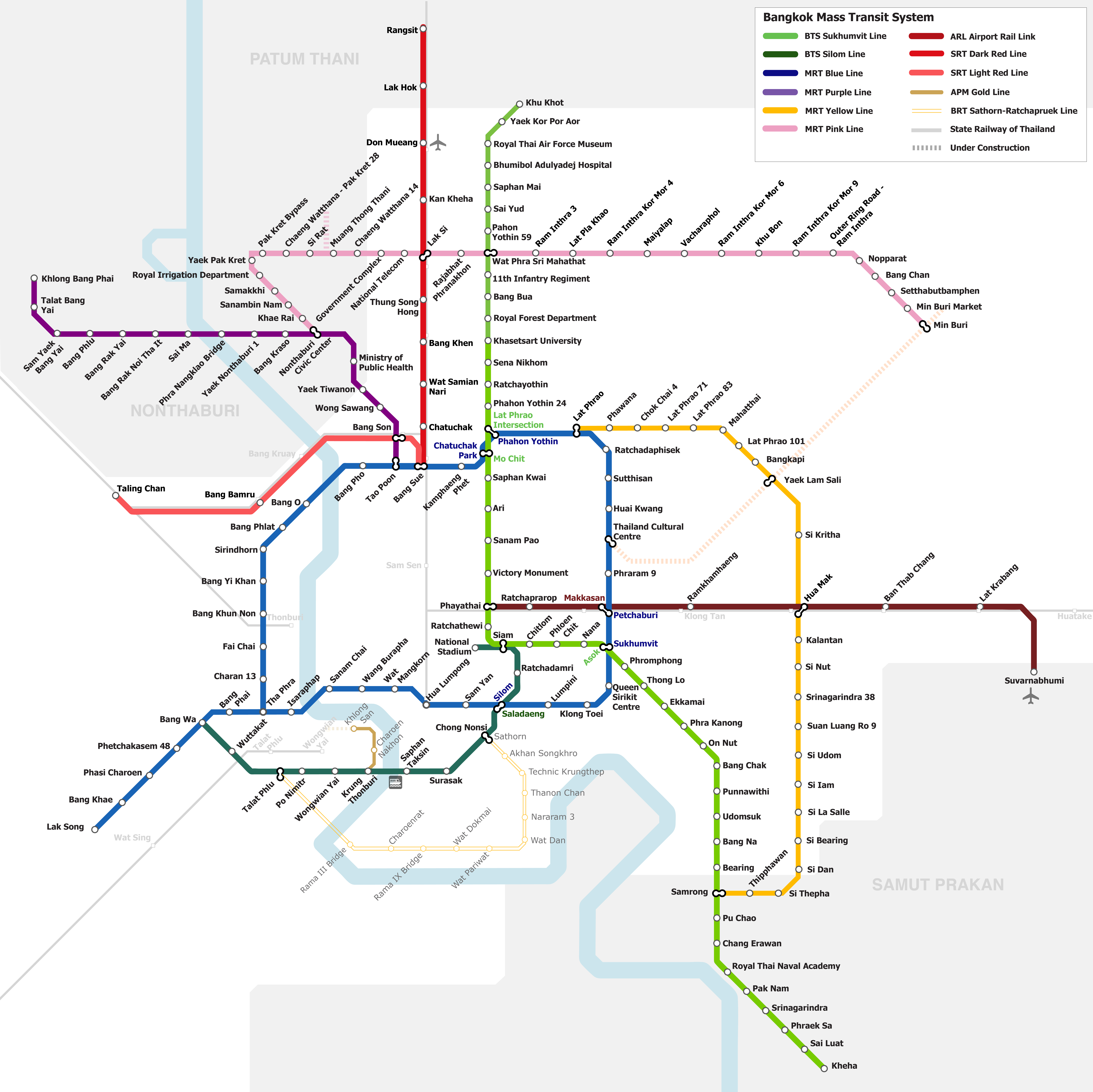
Current Bangkok Mass Rapid Transit Map
