= Vacharaphol MRT station =

Railway station in Bangkok, Thailand

Vacharaphol วัชรพล
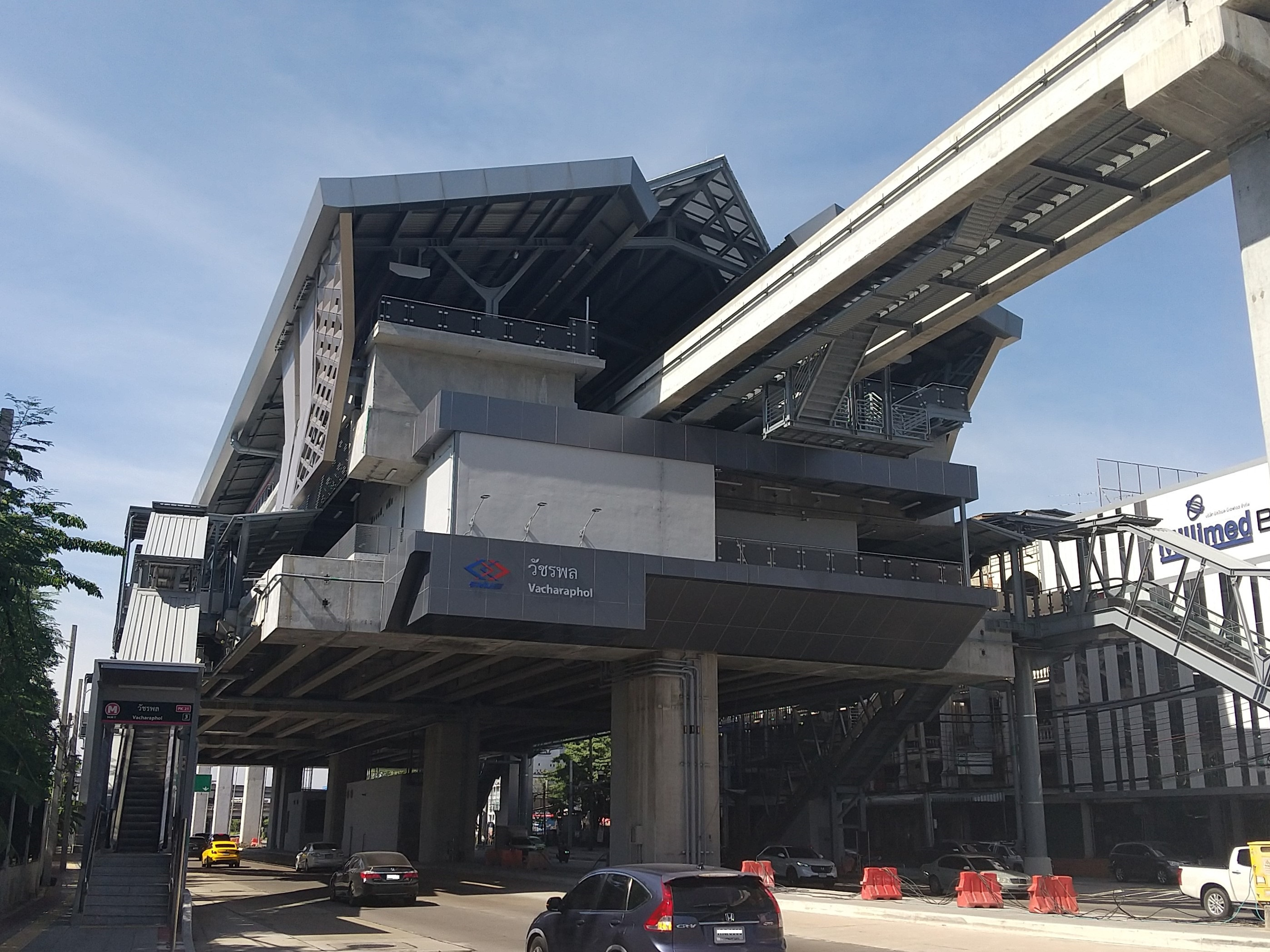

General information
- Location: Bang Khen District, Bangkok, Thailand
- System: MRT
- Owner: Mass Rapid Transit Authority of Thailand (MRTA)
- Operator: Northern Bangkok Monorail Company Limited
- Line: Pink Line

Other information
- Station code: PK21

History
- Opened: 21 November 2023

Services
Preceding station	Metropolitan Rapid Transit	Following station
Maiyalap towards Nonthaburi Civic Center	Pink Line	Ram Inthra Kor Mor 6 towards Min Buri
Location

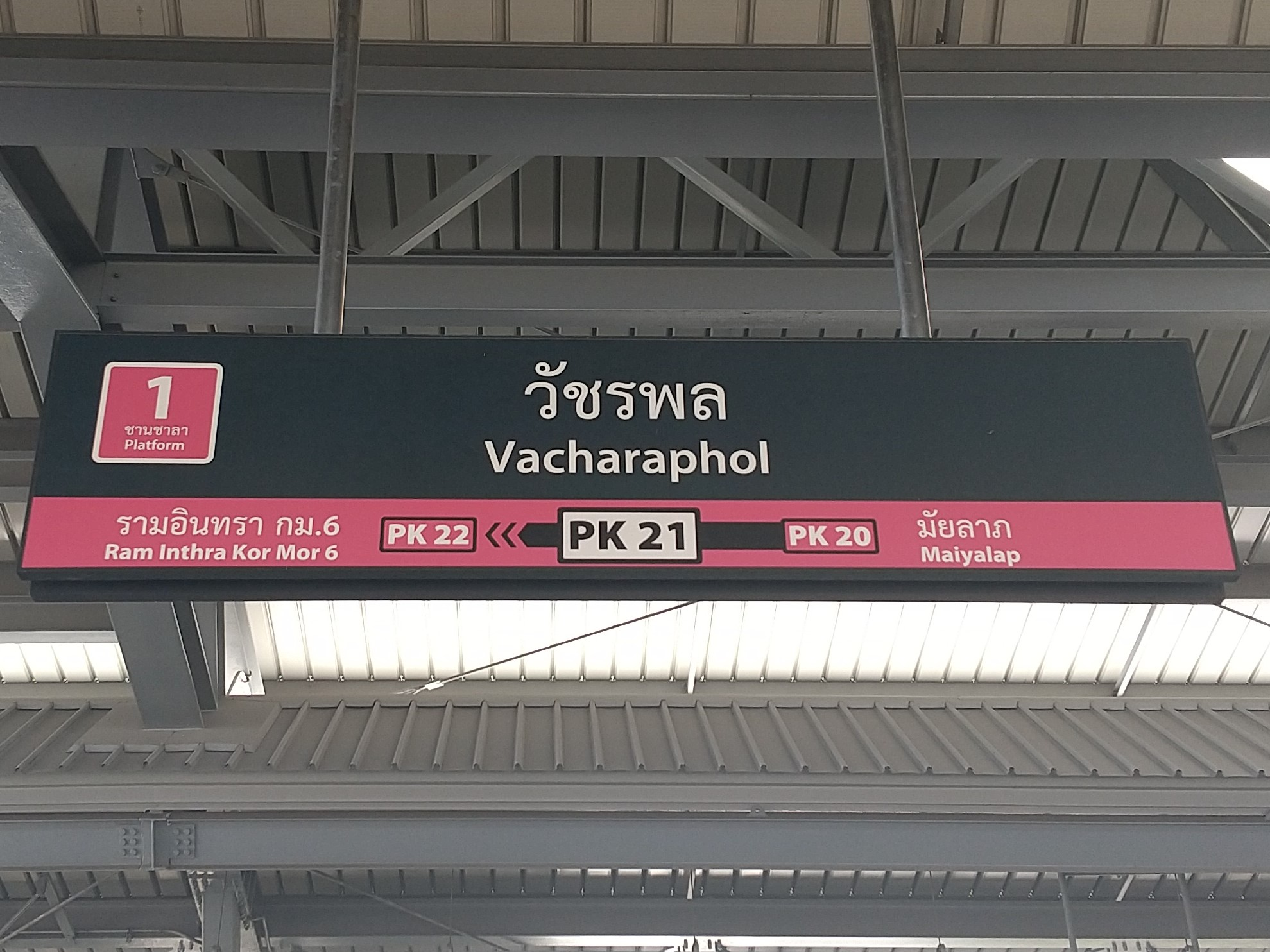
Signage

Vacharaphol station (Thai: สถานีวัชรพล) is a Bangkok MRT station on the Pink Line. The station is located on Ram Inthra Road, near the intersection of Ram Inthra Road with Chalong Rat Expressway in Bang Khen district, Bangkok. The station has four exits. It opened on 21 November 2023 as part of trial operations on the entire Pink Line. It is planned to be an interchange station with the MRT Grey Line in the future.
