= Light Blue Line (Bangkok) =

Light Blue Line รถไฟฟ้าสายสีฟ้า
- 12

Overview
- Status: Planned
- Owner: Mass Rapid Transit Authority of Thailand
- Locale: Bangkok, Thailand
- Termini: Pracha Songkhro; Chong Nonsi
- Stations: 9 (Planned)

Service
- System: MRT

Technical
- Line length: 9.5 kilometers (5.9 mi) (est.)

The Light Blue Line (Din Daeng – Sathon) is a planned monorail line to be built in Bangkok, Thailand. Its path runs along a north–south axis. This line would link the Din Daeng housing community areas, Bangkok City Hall 2, Makkasan Station (for the Suvarnabhumi Airport Rail Link), and the business area along Sathon Road.

The total distance of the route is approximately 9.5 km (5.9 mi) with 9 stations and an estimated 320,000 passengers per day.

== Progress ==
The Yingluck Shinawatra-led Pheu Thai government, elected in July 2011, decided not to pursue plans to continue the Grey Line and the Light Blue Line, citing that the lines would not be feasible within their 4-year, 10-lines priority plan. The Bangkok Metropolitan Administration (BMA) was invited to consider both projects but they would have to fund them.

The line was tentatively planned to be completed by 2029, but was deferred in 2011 by the government. Following the delays in 2013 and 2014 with tendering other priority mass transit lines related to the political crisis in Thailand, the Light Blue line was not considered by either the BMA or the Mass Rapid Transit Authority for many years. In 2013, the Bangkok Metropolitan Administration took over responsibility for the Light Blue line project.

BMA transferred the project to the Mass Rapid Transit Authority of Thailand (MRTA) on December 27, 2024, as it is believed that consolidating the project under a single owner will enable better control of fare prices, preventing them from becoming excessively high. After the transfer, the MRTA will reassess the project to determine the feasibility of further construction.

== Stations ==
The route has a total of 9 planned stations.

=== List of planned stations ===
Station Name	Transfer
Pracha Songkhro	MRT (under tender)
Mit Maitri
Din Daeng	MRT (under tender)
Makkasan	ARL MRT SRT (Tender 2022)
Phetchaburi
Phloen Chit	BTS
Lumphini	MRT
Suan Phlu
Chong Nonsi	BTS; Bangkok BRT

== Network map ==
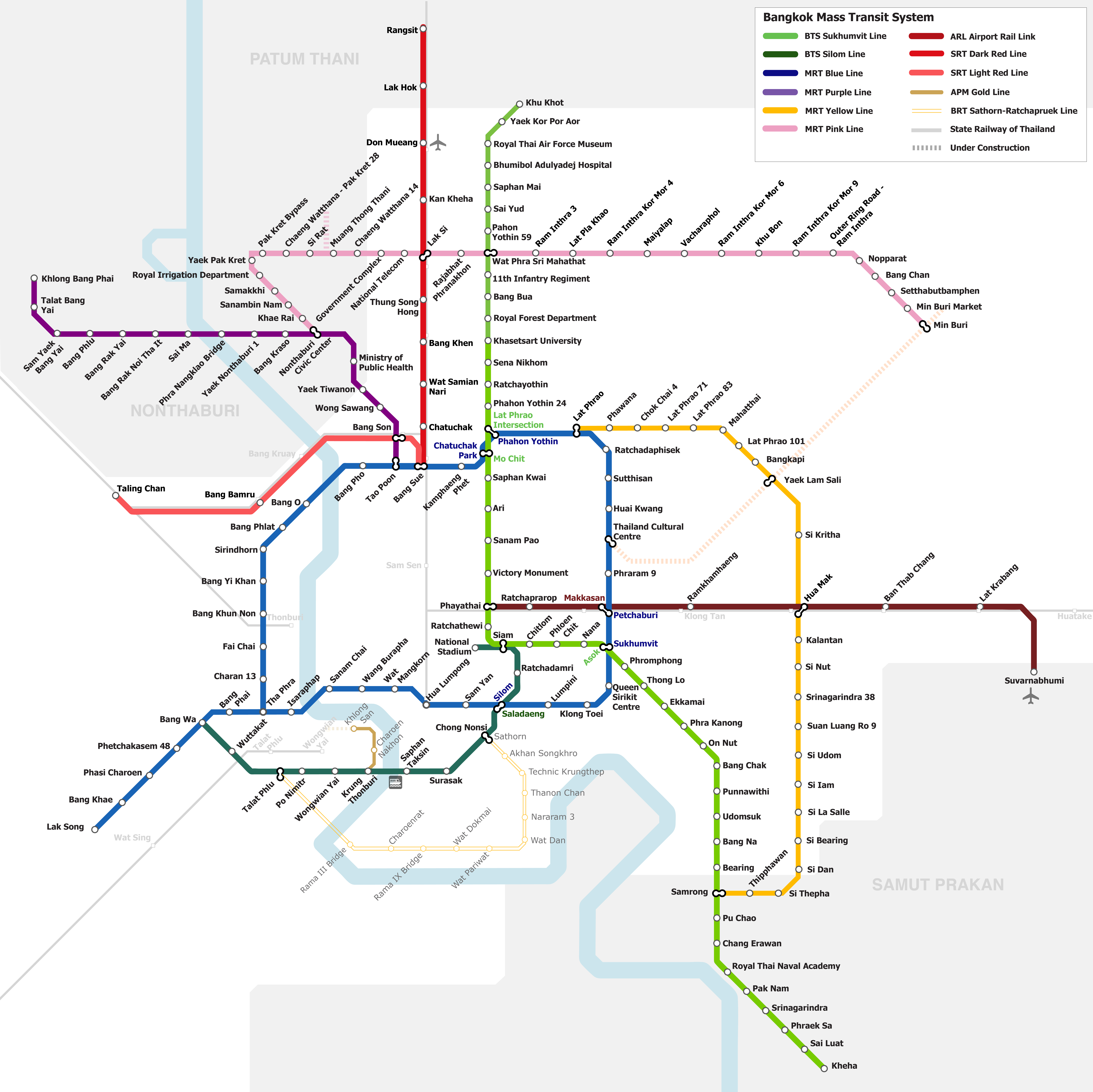

== See also ==
- Mass Rapid Transit Master Plan in Bangkok Metropolitan Region
- MRT (Bangkok)
- MRT Blue Line
- MRT Brown Line
- MRT Grey Line
- MRT Pink Line
- MRT Orange Line
- MRT Purple Line
- MRT Yellow Line
- BTS Skytrain
- BTS Sukhumvit Line
- BTS Silom Line
- Airport Rail Link (Bangkok)
- SRT Light Red Line
- SRT Dark Red Line
- Bangkok BRT
- BMA Gold Line
