= Seacon =

Seacon may refer to:

- The 19th World Science Fiction Convention, Seacon, held in Seattle, Washington, in 1961
- The 37th World Science Fiction Convention, Seacon '79, held in Brighton, England, in 1979
- Seacon Square Srinakarin, a mall located in eastern Bangkok, Thailand
- Seacon Square Bangkae, a mall located in Thonburi Bangkok, Thailand
