= Si Iam MRT station =

Monorail station in Bangkok, Thailand

Si Iam ศรีเอี่ยม
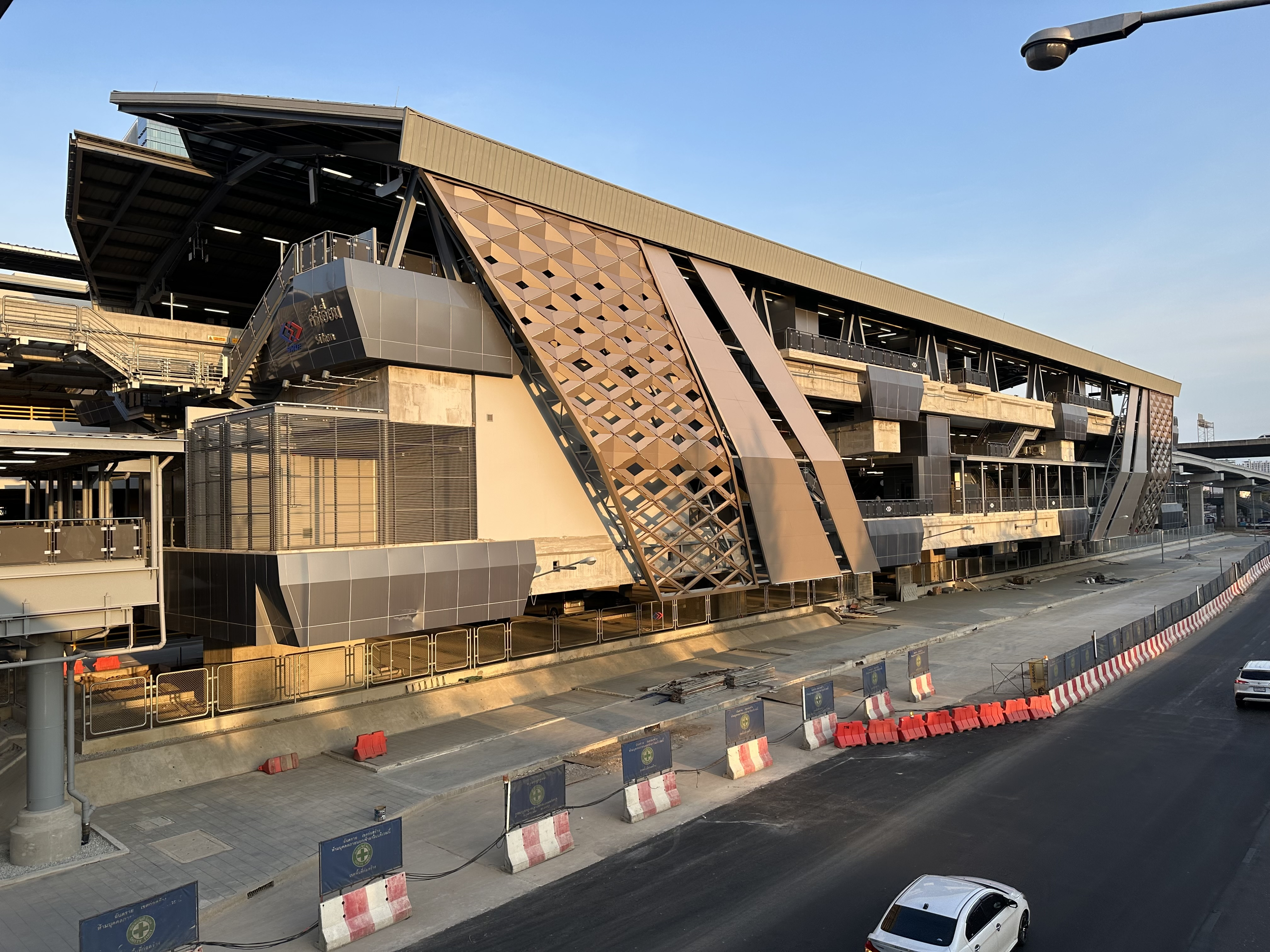

General information
- Location: Bang Na District, Bangkok, Thailand
- Coordinates: 13.6677°N 100.6451°E
- System: MRT
- Owner: Mass Rapid Transit Authority of Thailand (MRTA)
- Operator: Eastern Bangkok Monorail Company Limited (EBM)
- Line: Yellow Line

Other information
- Station code: YL17

History
- Opened: 3 June 2023; 3 years ago

Services
Preceding station	Metropolitan Rapid Transit	Following station
Si Udom towards Lat Phrao	Yellow Line	Si La Salle towards Samrong
Location

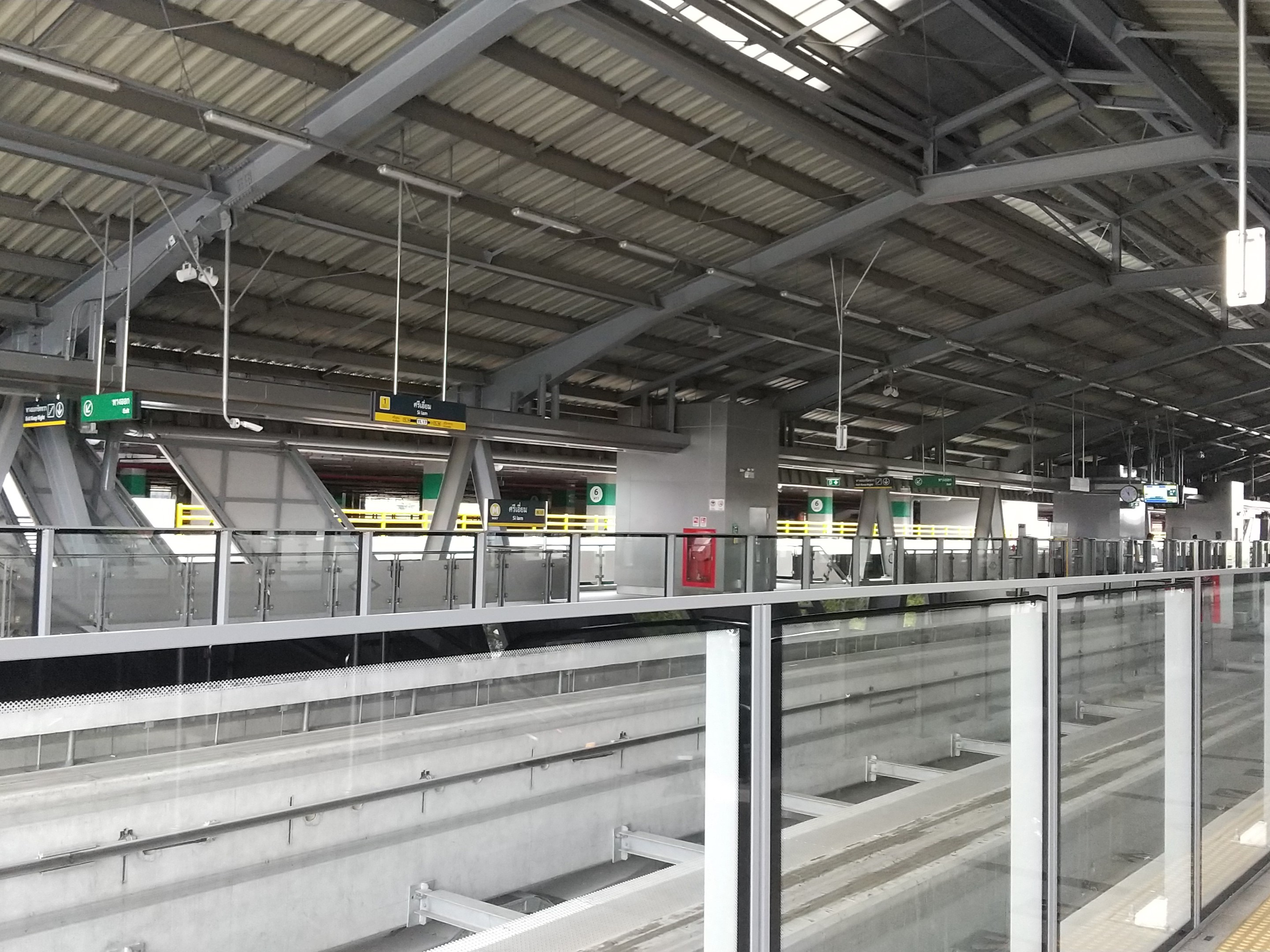
Platforms

Si Iam station (Thai: สถานีศรีเอี่ยม, pronounced [sā.tʰǎː.nīː sǐː ʔìa̯m]) is a Bangkok MRT station on the Yellow Line. The station is located on Srinagarindra Road in Bang Na District, Bangkok and is named after Si Iam Interchange where the Srinagarindra and Debaratna roads intersect. The station has four entrances and is the location of the line's depot. It opened on 3 June 2023 as part of trial operations on the line between Samrong and Hua Mak.

== Station layout ==
U3	Side platform, doors will open on the left
U3	Platform 1	Yellow towards Samrong (Si La Salle)
U3	Platform 2	Yellow towards Lat Phrao (Si Udom)
U3	Side platform, doors will open on the left
U2	Concourse	Exit 1-4, Ticket machines
G	-	Bus stop, Wat Si Iam
