= Srinagarindra 38 MRT station =

Monorail station in Bangkok, Thailand

Srinagarindra 38 ศรีนครินทร์ 38
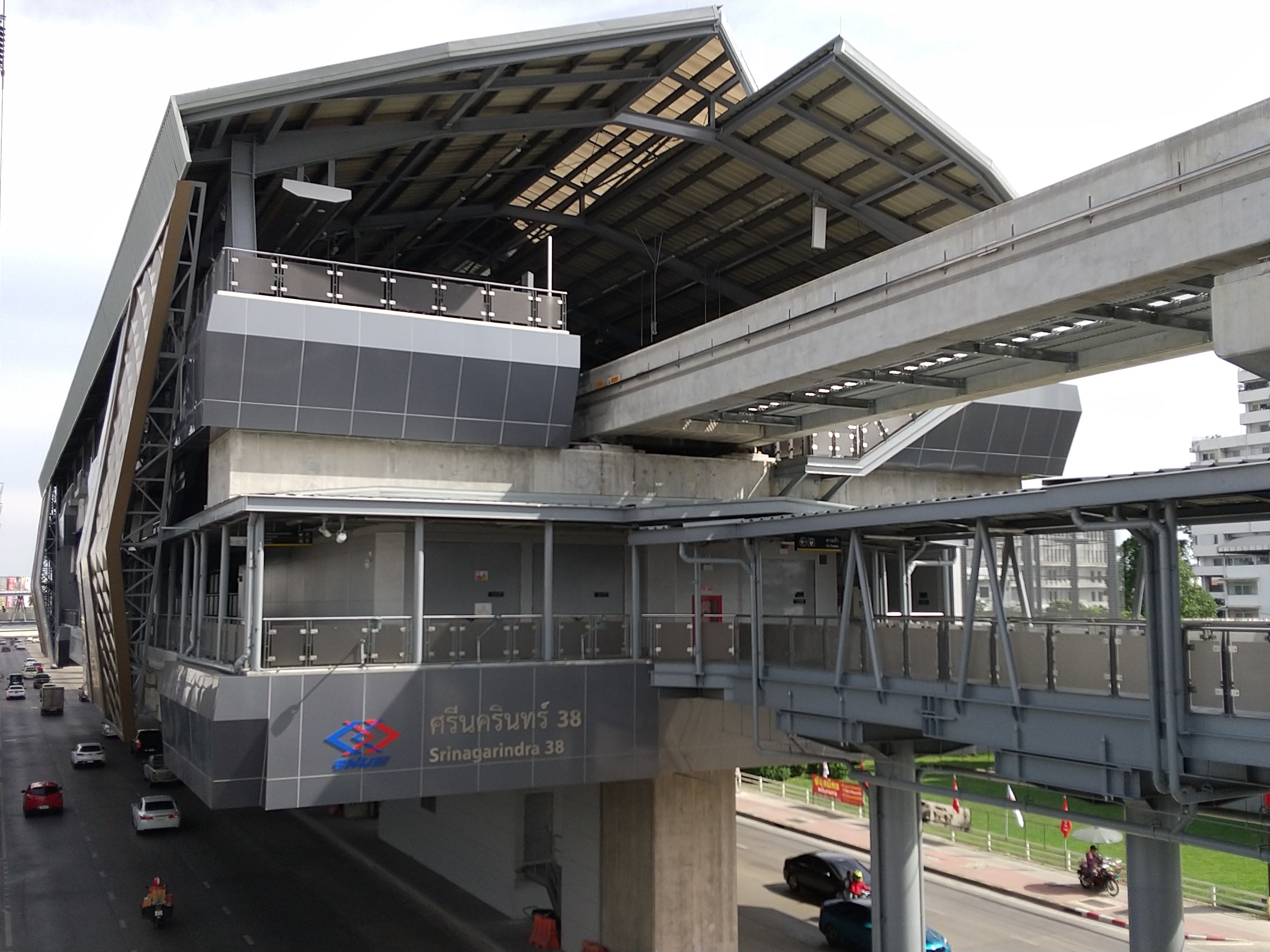

General information
- Location: Prawet District, Bangkok, Thailand
- Coordinates: 13.7010°N 100.6465°E
- System: MRT
- Owner: Mass Rapid Transit Authority of Thailand (MRTA)
- Operator: Eastern Bangkok Monorail Company Limited (EBM)
- Line: Yellow Line

Other information
- Station code: YL14

History
- Opened: 3 June 2023; 3 years ago

Services
Preceding station	Metropolitan Rapid Transit	Following station
Si Nut towards Lat Phrao	Yellow Line	Suan Luang Rama IX towards Samrong
Location

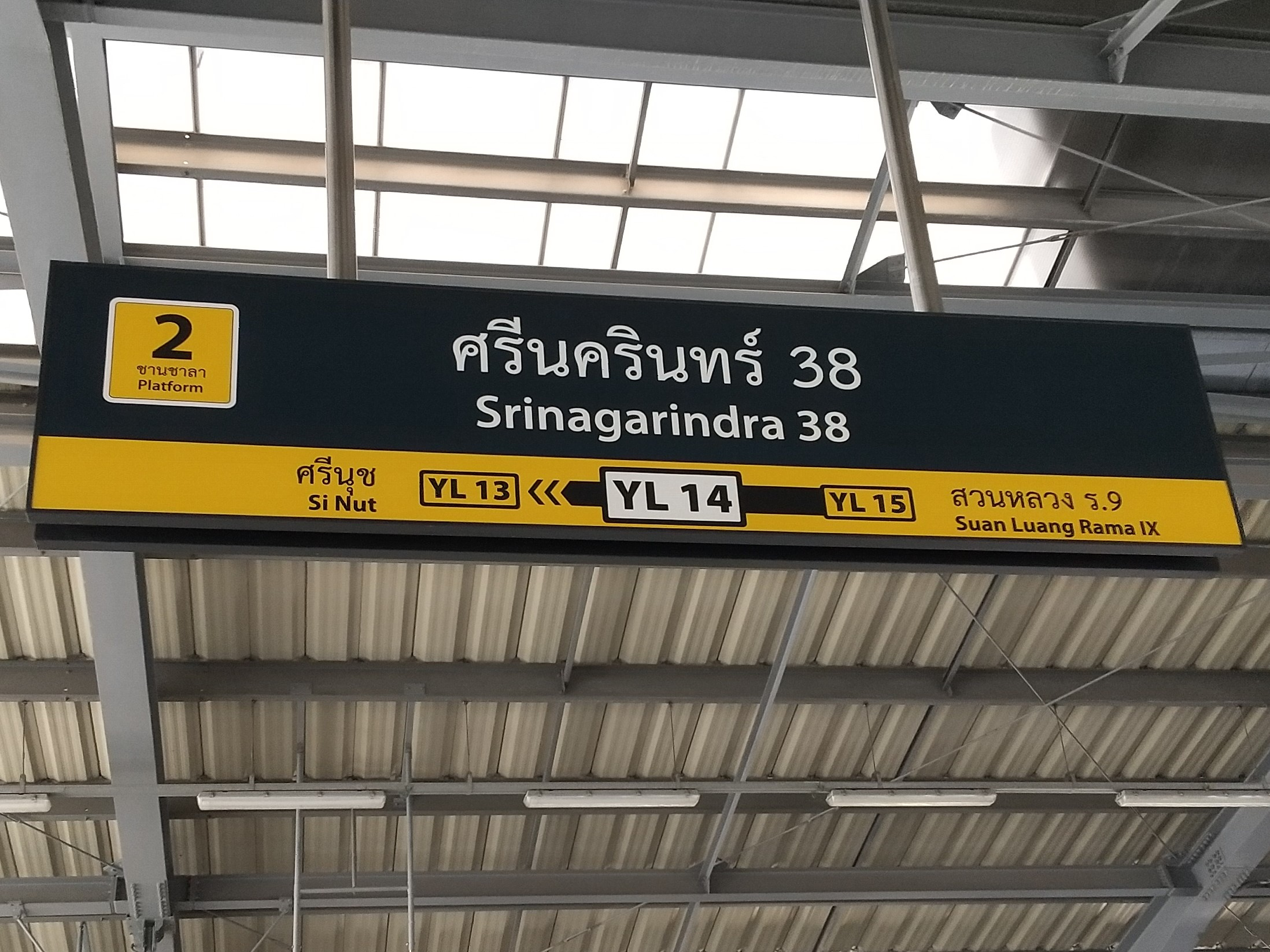
Signage

Srinagarindra 38 station (Thai: สถานีศรีนครินทร์ 38, RTGS: Sathani Si Nakharin Sam Sip Paet, pronounced [sā.tʰǎː.nīː sǐː ná(ʔ).kʰā.rīn sǎːm sìp pɛ̀ːt]) is a Bangkok MRT station on the Yellow Line. The station is located on Srinagarindra Road in Prawet District, Bangkok and is named after Srinagarindra 38 Road which branches off from the main road. The station has four entrances. It opened on 3 June 2023 as part of trial operations on the line between Samrong and Hua Mak.

== Station layout ==
U3	Side platform, doors will open on the left
U3	Platform 1	Yellow towards Samrong (Suan Luang Rama IX)
U3	Platform 2	Yellow towards Lat Phrao (Si Nut)
U3	Side platform, doors will open on the left
U2	Concourse	Exit 1–4, Ticket machines
G	-	Bus stop
