= Si Nut MRT station =

Monorail station in Bangkok, Thailand

Si Nut ศรีนุช
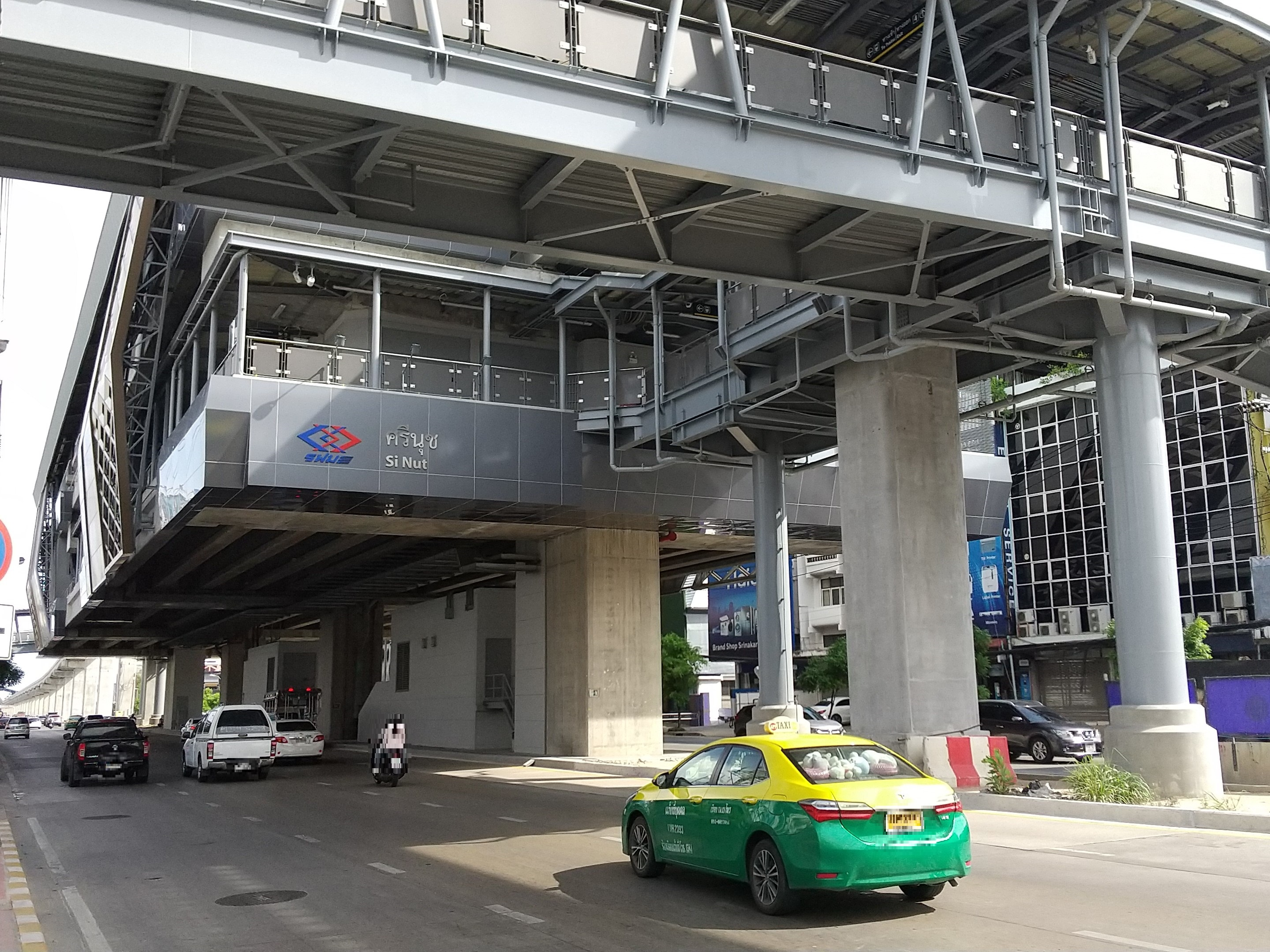

General information
- Location: Suan Luang District, Bangkok, Thailand
- Coordinates: 13.7110°N 100.6441°E
- System: MRT
- Owner: Mass Rapid Transit Authority of Thailand (MRTA)
- Operator: Eastern Bangkok Monorail Company Limited (EBM)
- Line: Yellow Line

Other information
- Station code: YL13

History
- Opened: 3 June 2023; 3 years ago

Services
Preceding station	Metropolitan Rapid Transit	Following station
Kalantan towards Lat Phrao	Yellow Line	Srinagarindra 38 towards Samrong
Location

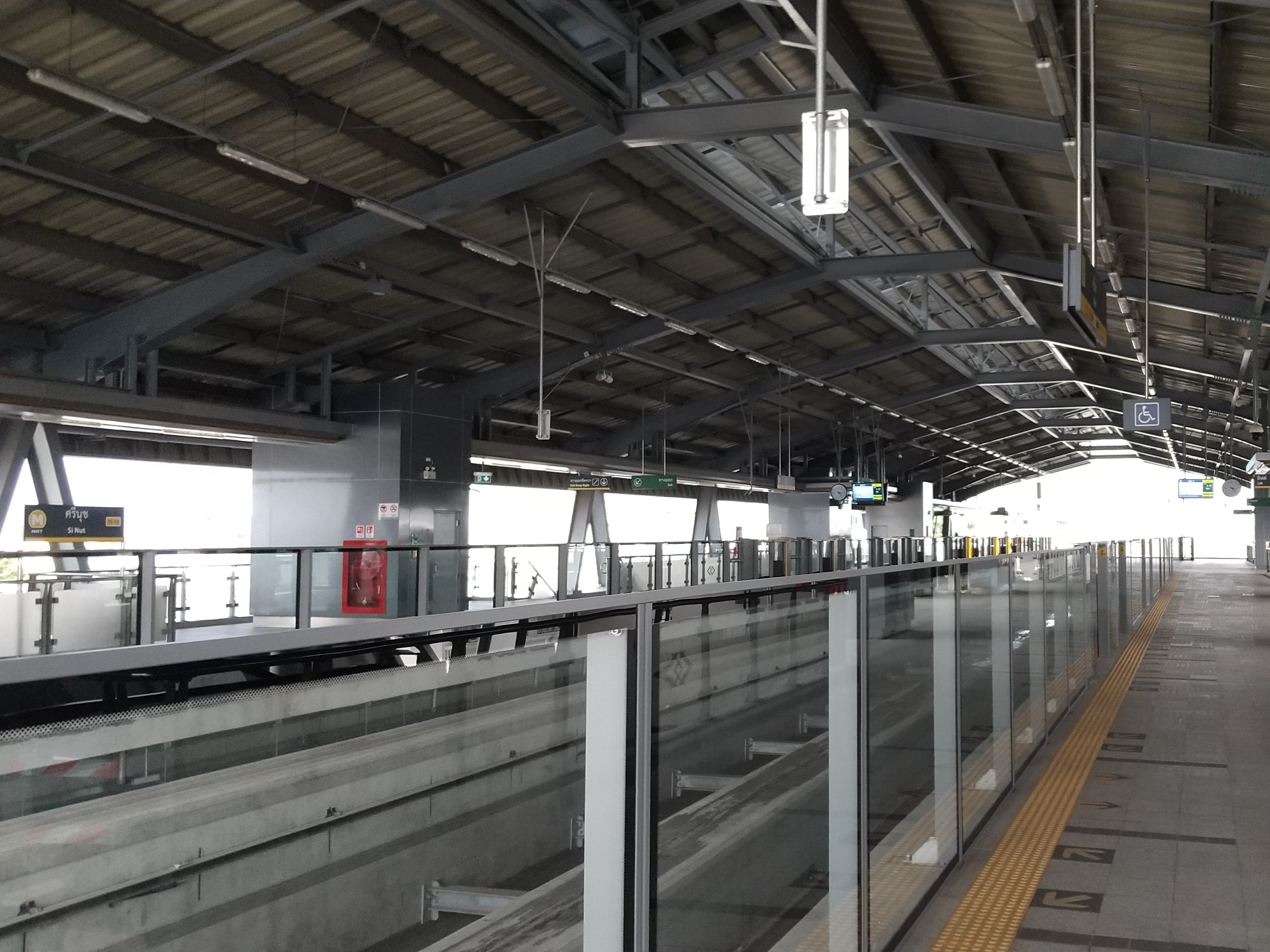
Platforms

Si Nut station (Thai: สถานีศรีนุช, pronounced [sā.tʰǎː.nīː sǐː nút]) is a Bangkok MRT station on the Yellow Line. The station is located on Srinagarindra Road in Suan Luang District, Bangkok and is a portmanteau of the names of Srinagarindra and On Nut roads, which intersect adjacent to the station. The station has four entrances. It opened on 3 June 2023 as part of trial operations on the line between Samrong and Hua Mak.

== Station layout ==
U3	Side platform, doors will open on the left
U3	Platform 1	Yellow towards Samrong (Srinagarindra 38)
U3	Platform 2	Yellow towards Lat Phrao (Kalantan)
U3	Side platform, doors will open on the left
U2	Concourse	Exit 1-4, Ticket machines
G	-	Bus stop
