= Paradise Park (mall) =

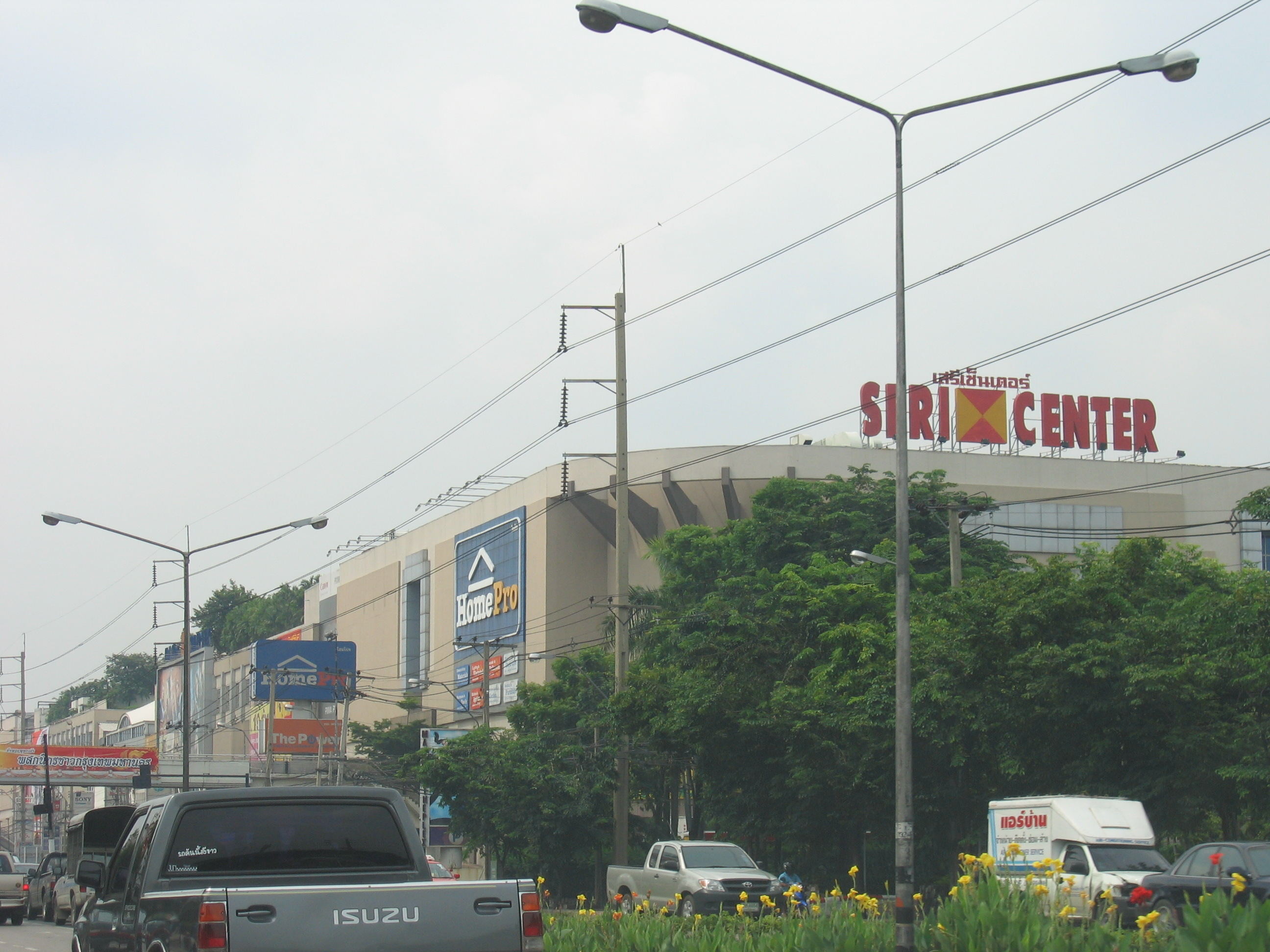
- Old Seri Center since 1994
- Location: Prawet, Bangkok, Thailand
- Coordinates: 13.6877°N 100.6472°E
- Address: 61 Srinagarindra Road, Nong Bon, Prawet, Bangkok 10250
- Opened: 24 August 2010
- Developer: MBK Group & Siam Piwat
- Manager: MBK PLC. PT Retail Corp., Ltd (Tokyu)
- Owner: MBK Group
- Num. of stores: 700+
- Num. of anchor tenants: 6
- Floor area: 290,000 square metres (3,100,000 sq ft)
- Floors: 5
- Website: www.paradisepark.co.th

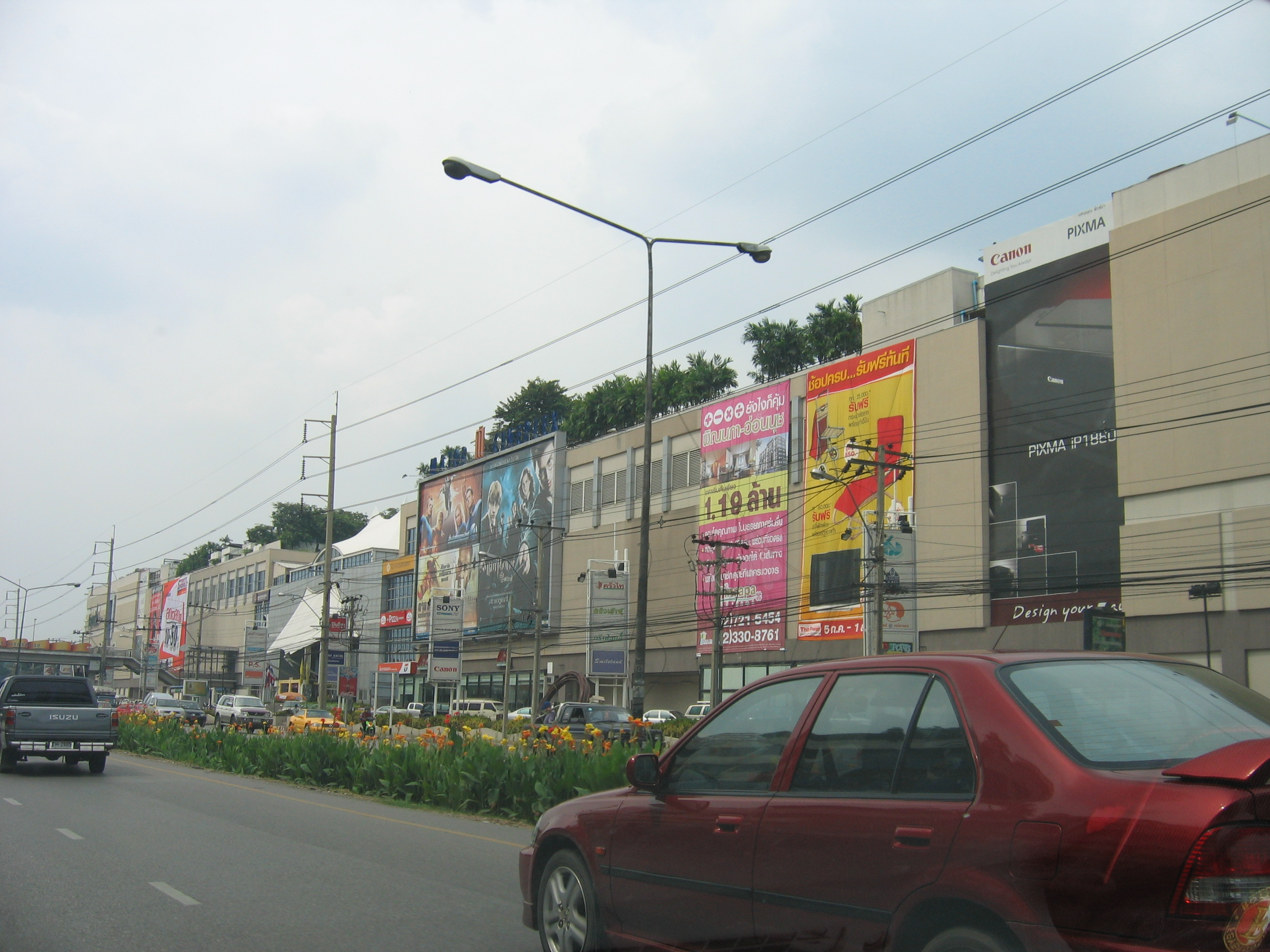
Exterior of Seri Center

Paradise Park or formerly known as Seri Center is a shopping mall located in Prawet, Bangkok, Thailand. The retail giants Siam Piwat and MBK made a new joint-venture for new opportunities in the suburbs of Bangkok their Paradise Park Srinagarindra transformed Seri Center at a total cost of Bt3.2 billion. The mall opened officially on August 24, 2010 . It has been a rival to a nearby mall, Seacon Square. Of the visitors to Paradise Park, about 70 per cent are people who live within a 3-kilometre radius, while the rest come from other areas of Bangkok as well as upcountry. The two companies bought the shares of Seri Centre Management for more than Bt975 million and transformed it into a new mega-mall that is expected to attract about 100,000 visitors a day.

It was served by Suan Luang Rama IX MRT station since 2023.

== Facilities ==
=== Anchors ===
Paradise Park's major retail anchors include:

- Villa Market
- Seri Market
- SportsWorld
- HomePro
  - The Power

==== Former Anchors ====
- Printemps Opened in 1994 Closed down in 199x
- Daimaru Opened in 1994 Closed down in 2000
- @ease Department Store Opened in 2000 Closed down in 2009
- Tokyu Department Store Closed down in January 2019
- Paradise Cineplex 8 Cinemas Closed down in December 2022 (Moved to Seacon Cineplex Seacon Square Srinagarindra)

=== Mall Zones ===
- Dining Paradise
- Food Bazaar (doner kebab)
- Beauty Park
- Digital World
- Money Park
- World of Edutainment
- Fashion Avenue
- Living & Lifestyle
- The Promenade

=== Restaurants ===
- Food courts are located on the ground floor and on the first floor of the shopping mall. There are two food courts on the ground floor at opposite ends of the mall, near the markets. There are also Japanese restaurants, fast food and an MK steamboat restaurant.
- At food bazar you can find doner kebab (Turkish) too.
- Cafe Olivie: Italian Cuisine

=== Parking ===
Seri Center has an eight-level carpark with a capacity of 4,000 cars. There is no fee for parking in the secured building.

=== Ramathibodi Health Space ===
On 3 December 2023, the Faculty of Medicine Ramathibodi Hospital, Mahidol University opened "Ramathibodi Health Space", an outpatient clinic located in the mall. This was part of the faculty's "decentralized medicine" concept, whereby patients could access tertiary care without having to travel to the main campus in central Bangkok.

== Nearby attractions ==
- Rama IX Park
- Seacon Square
- Central Bangna

== See also ==
- List of shopping malls in Thailand
