= Si Bearing MRT station =

Monorail station in Bangkok, Thailand

Si Bearing ศรีแบริ่ง
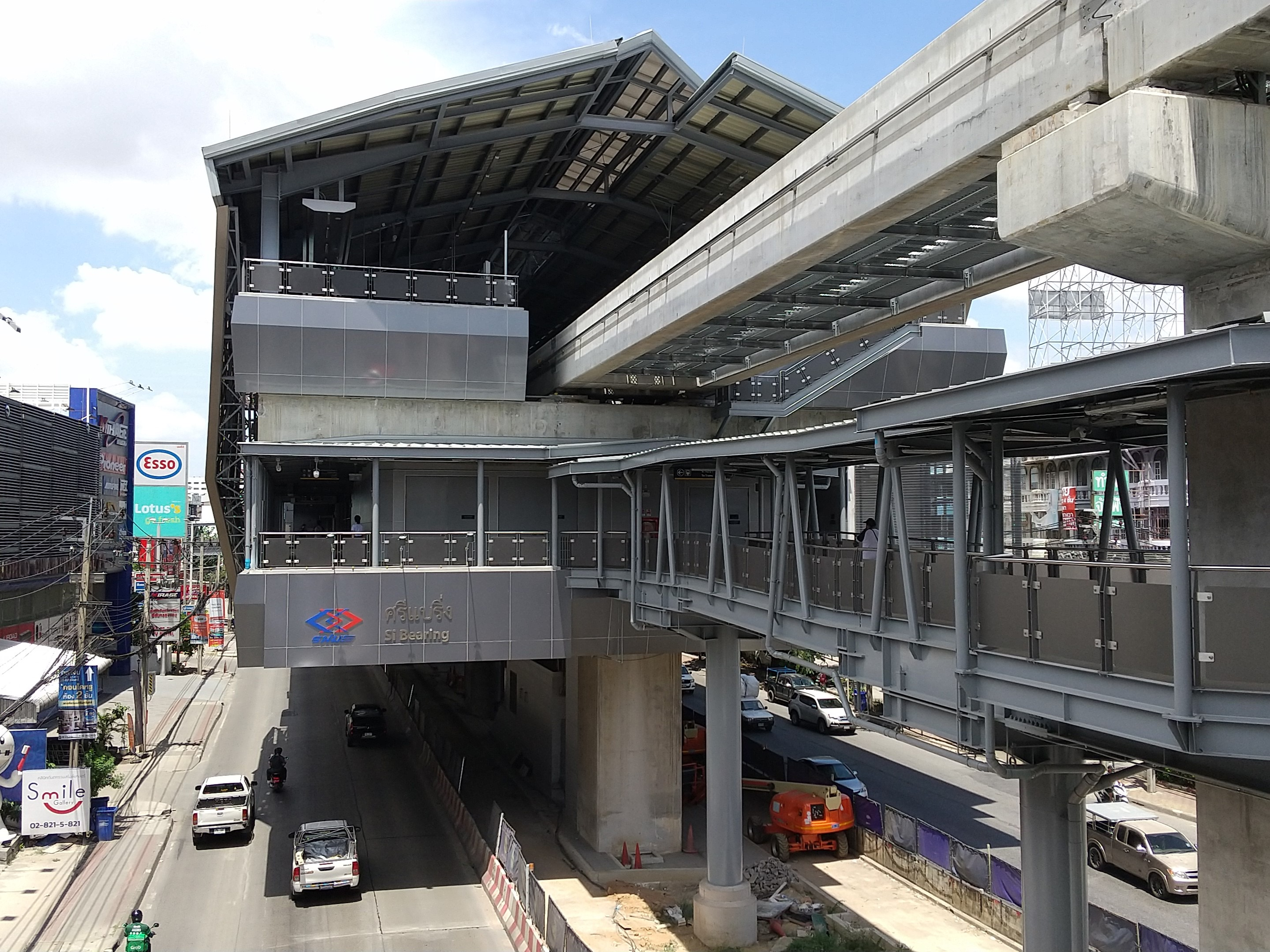

General information
- Location: Mueang Samut Prakan, Samut Prakan, Thailand
- Coordinates: 13.6435°N 100.6362°E
- System: MRT
- Owner: Mass Rapid Transit Authority of Thailand (MRTA)
- Operator: Eastern Bangkok Monorail Company Limited (EBM)
- Line: Yellow Line

Other information
- Station code: YL19

History
- Opened: 3 June 2023; 3 years ago

Services
Preceding station	Metropolitan Rapid Transit	Following station
Si La Salle towards Lat Phrao	Yellow Line	Si Dan towards Samrong
Location

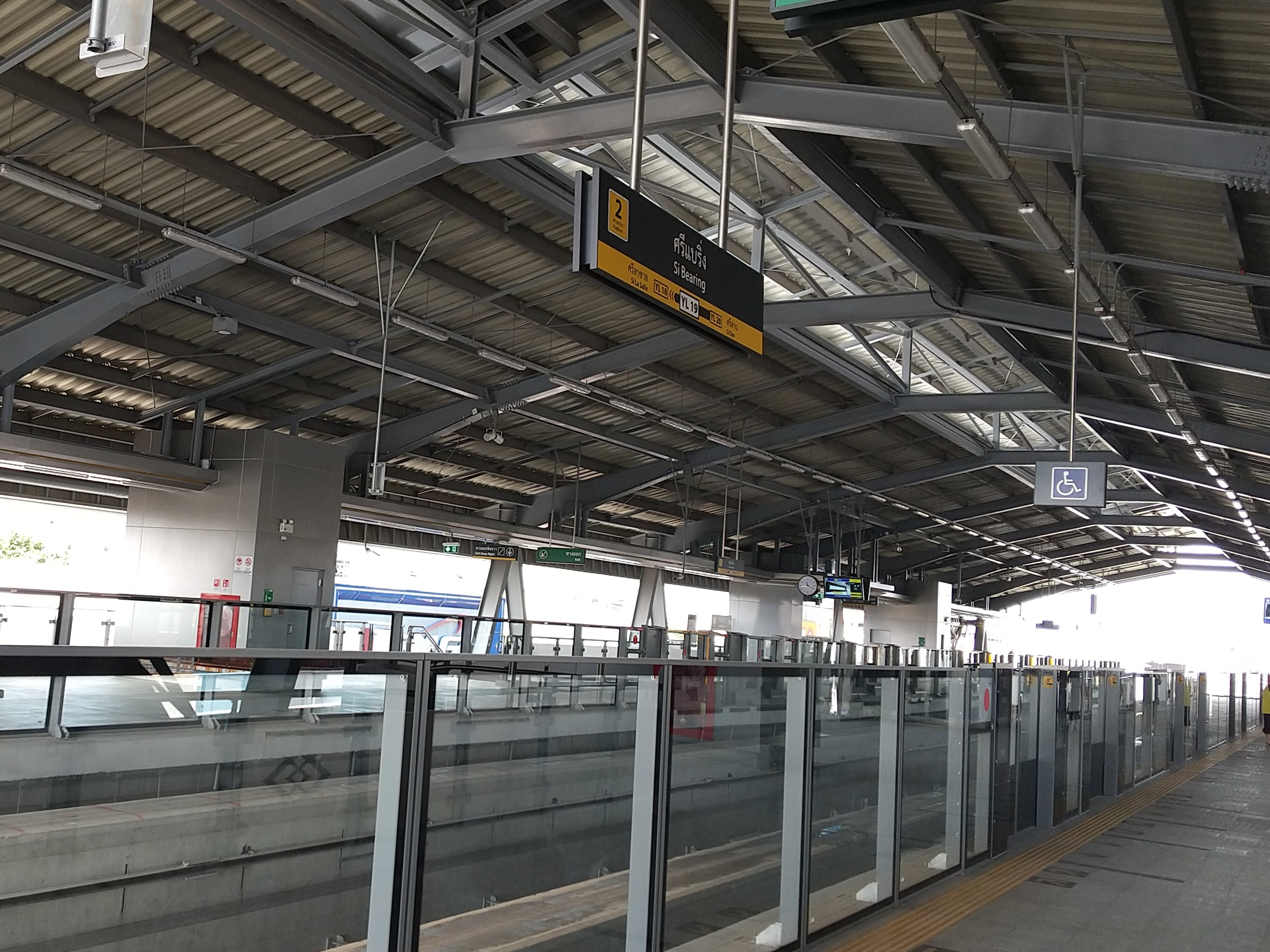
Platforms

Si Bearing station (Thai: สถานีศรีแบริ่ง, RTGS: Sathani Si Baering, pronounced [sā.tʰǎː.nīː sǐː bɛ̄ː.rîŋ]) is a Bangkok MRT station on the Yellow Line. The station is located on Srinagarindra Road in Samut Prakan Province and is a portmanteau of the name of Srinagarindra and Bearing (Sukhumvit 107) roads, which intersect adjacent to the station. The station has four entrances. It opened on 3 June 2023, as part of trial operations on the sections between Samrong and Hua Mak.

== Station layout ==
U3	Side platform, doors will open on the left
U3	Platform 1	Yellow towards Samrong (Si Dan)
U3	Platform 2	Yellow towards Lat Phrao (Si La Salle)
U3	Side platform, doors will open on the left
U2	Concourse	Exit 1-4, Ticket machines
G	-	Bus stop
