= Suan Luang Rama IX MRT station =

Monorail station in Bangkok, Thailand

Suan Luang Rama IX สวนหลวง ร.9
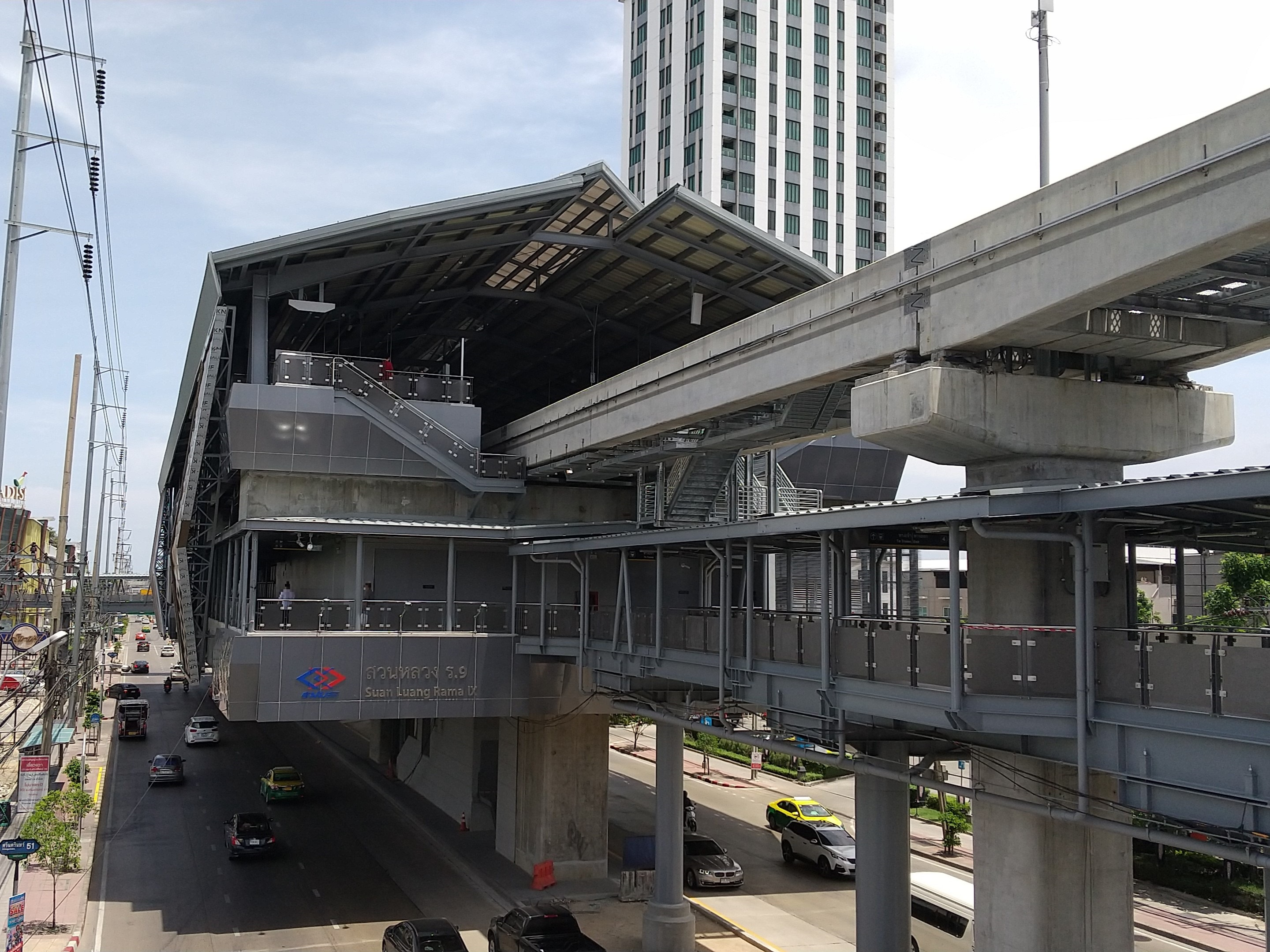

General information
- Location: Prawet District, Bangkok, Thailand
- Coordinates: 13.6908°N 100.6470°E
- System: MRT
- Owner: Mass Rapid Transit Authority of Thailand (MRTA)
- Operator: Eastern Bangkok Monorail Company Limited (EBM)
- Line: Yellow Line

Other information
- Station code: YL15

History
- Opened: 3 June 2023; 3 years ago

Services
Preceding station	Metropolitan Rapid Transit	Following station
Srinagarindra 38 towards Lat Phrao	Yellow Line	Si Udom towards Samrong
Location

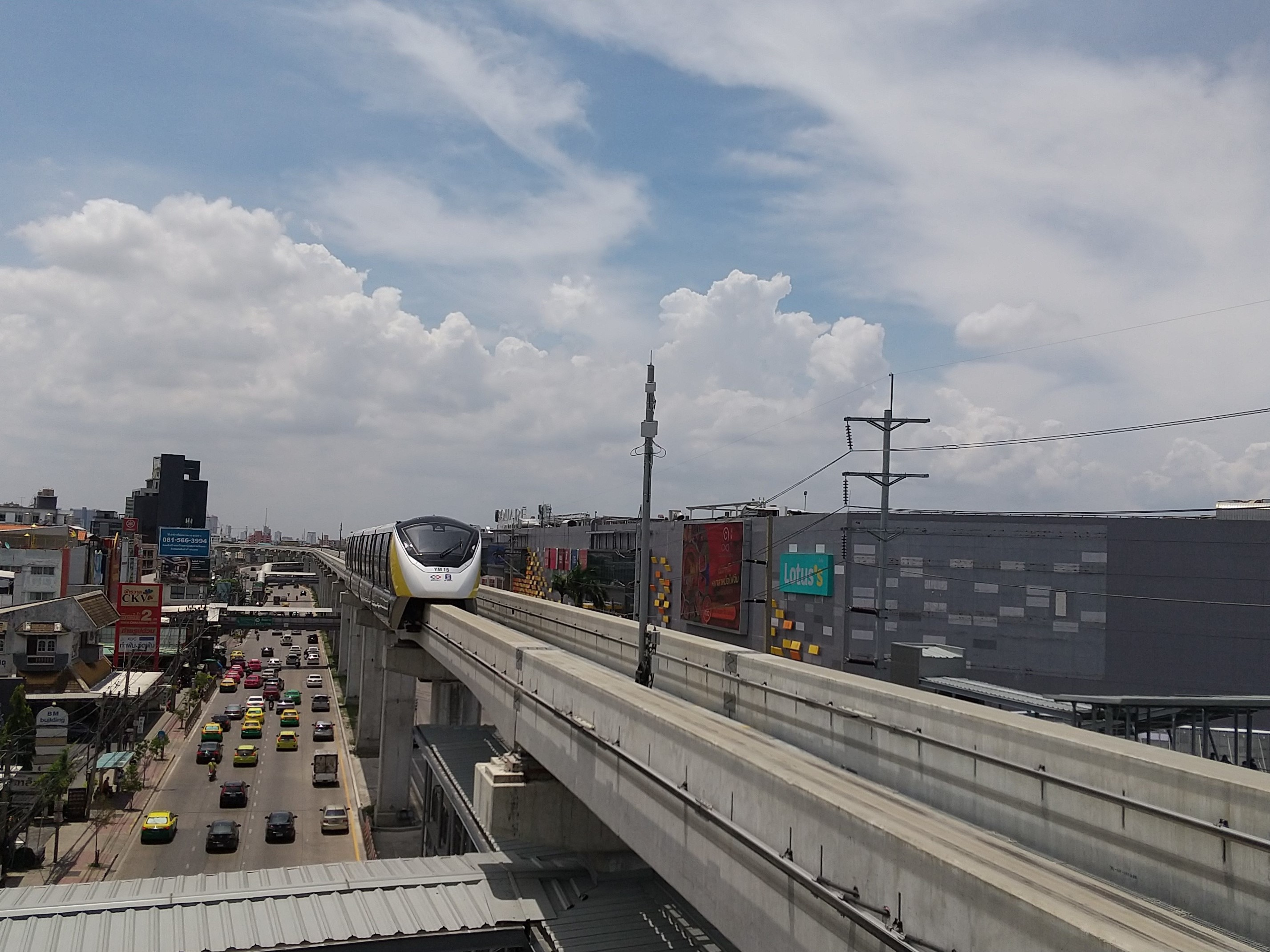
Southbound train approaching with Seacon Square in the background

Suan Luang Rama IX station (Thai: สถานีสวนหลวง ร.9, RTGS: Sathani Suan Luang Ro Kao, pronounced [sā.tʰǎː.nīː sǔan lǔaŋ rɔ̄ː kâːw]) is a Bangkok MRT station on the Yellow Line. The station is located on Srinagarindra Road in Prawet district, Bangkok. The station has four entrances and is located in front of Seacon Square and Paradise Park shopping malls. It opened on 3 June 2023 as part of trial operations on the line between Samrong and Hua Mak. Although the station is named after Suan Luang Rama IX park, the distance between the park and the station is over 1 km.

== Station layout ==
U3	Side platform, doors will open on the left
U3	Platform 1	Yellow towards Samrong (Si Udom)
U3	Platform 2	Yellow towards Lat Phrao (Srinagarindra 38)
U3	Side platform, doors will open on the left
U2	Concourse	Exit 1-4, elevated walkway to Seacon Square, Ticket machines
G	-	Bus stop
