= Si Udom MRT station =

Monorail station in Bangkok, Thailand

Si Udom ศรีอุดม
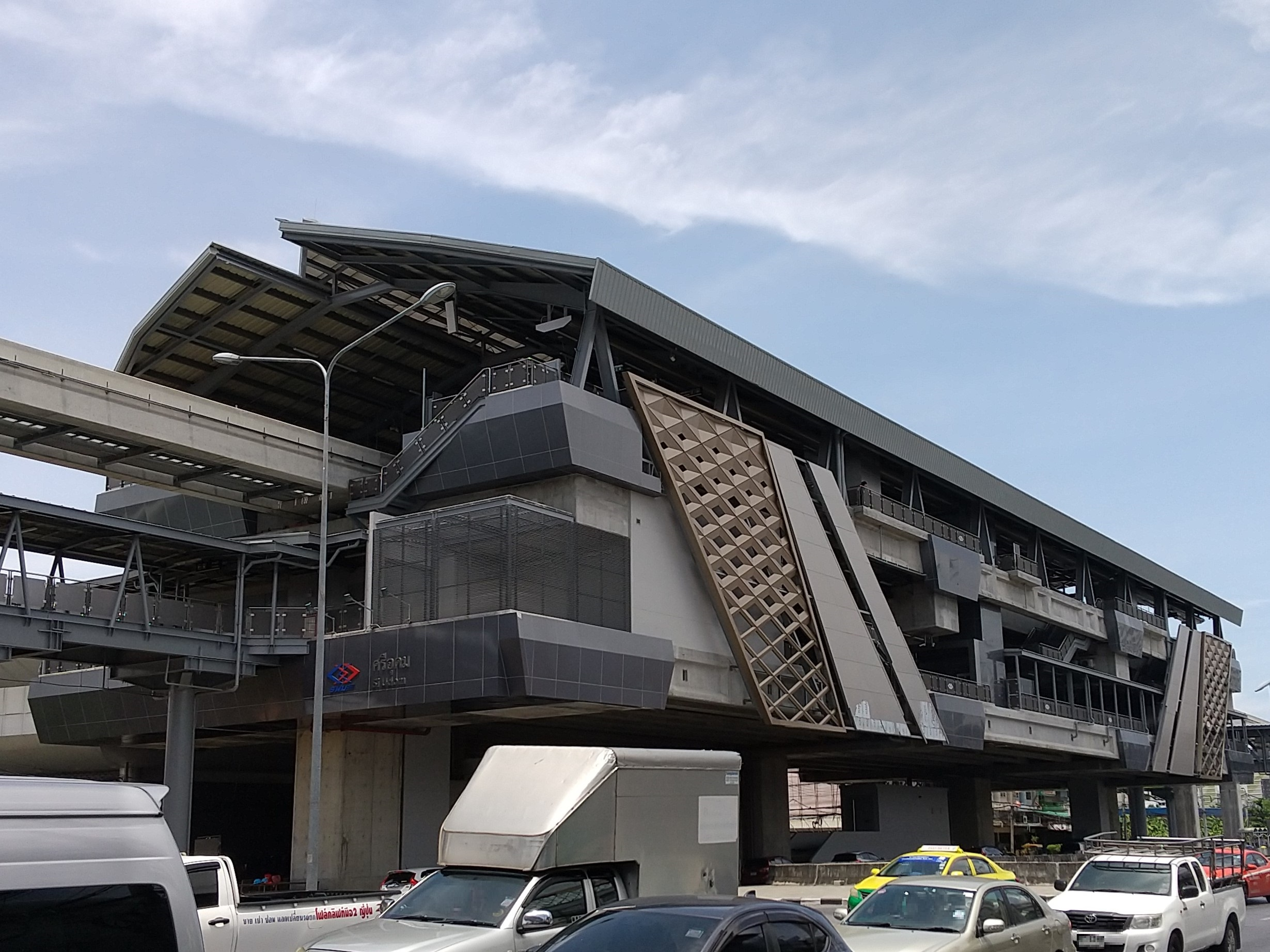

General information
- Location: Prawet District, Bangkok, Thailand
- Coordinates: 13.6766°N 100.6461°E
- System: MRT
- Owner: Mass Rapid Transit Authority of Thailand (MRTA)
- Operator: Eastern Bangkok Monorail Company Limited (EBM)
- Line: Yellow Line

Other information
- Station code: YL16

History
- Opened: 3 June 2023; 3 years ago

Services
Preceding station	Metropolitan Rapid Transit	Following station
Suan Luang Rama IX towards Lat Phrao	Yellow Line	Si Iam towards Samrong
Location

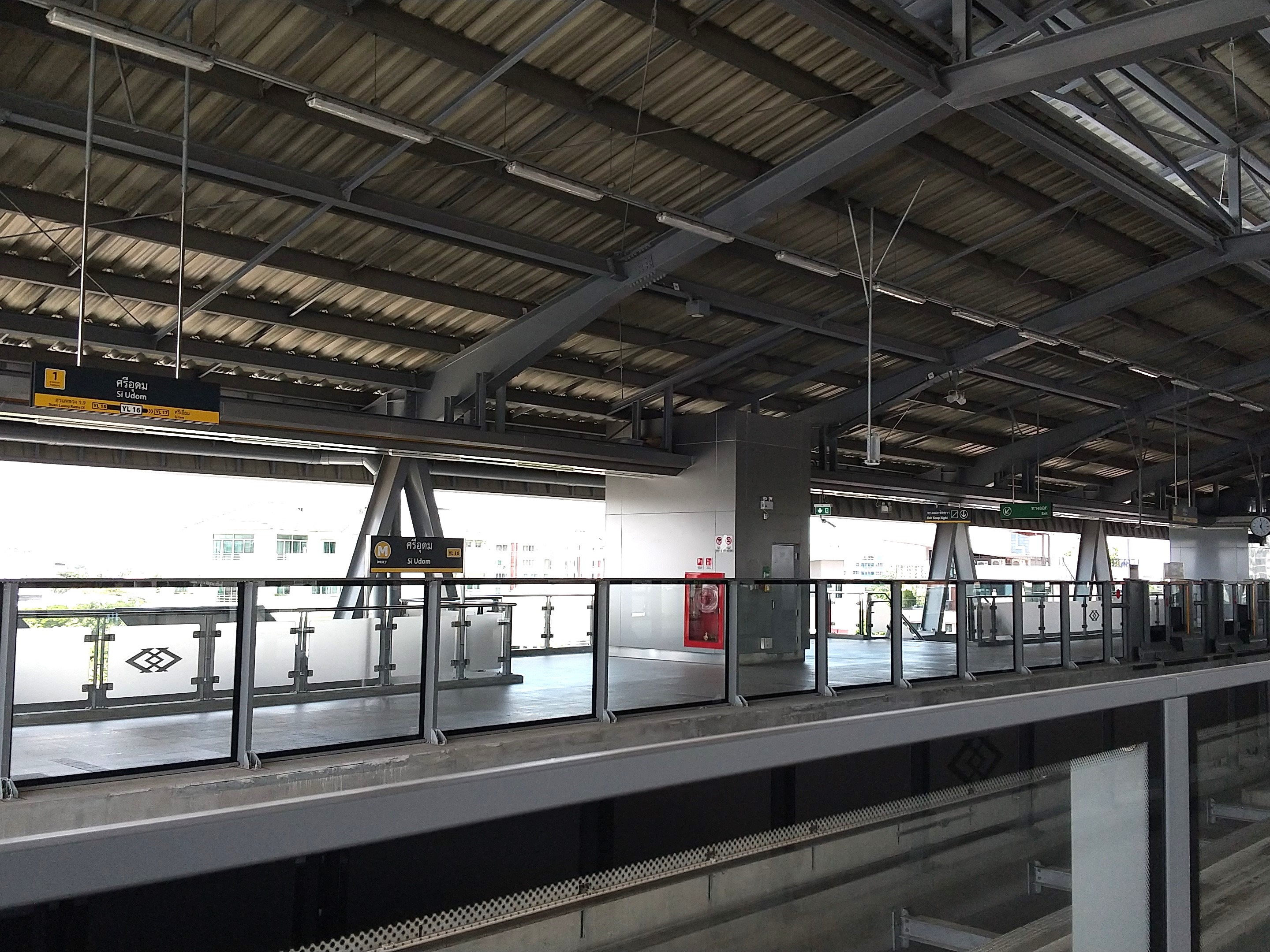
Platforms

Si Udom station (Thai: สถานีศรีอุดม, pronounced [sā.tʰǎː.nīː sǐː ʔùʔ.dōm]) is a Bangkok MRT station on the Yellow Line. The station is located on Srinagarindra Road in Prawet District, Bangkok and is a portmanteau of the name of Srinagarindra and Udom Suk (Sukhumvit 103) roads, which intersect adjacent to the station. The station has four entrances. It opened on 3 June 2023 as part of trial operations on the line between Samrong and Hua Mak.

== Station layout ==
U3	Side platform, doors will open on the left
U3	Platform 1	Yellow towards Samrong (Si Iam)
U3	Platform 2	Yellow towards Lat Phrao (Suan Luang Rama IX)
U3	Side platform, doors will open on the left
U2	Concourse	Exit 1-4, Ticket machines
G	-	Bus stop
