= Kalantan MRT station =

Monorail station in Bangkok, Thailand

Kalantan กลันตัน
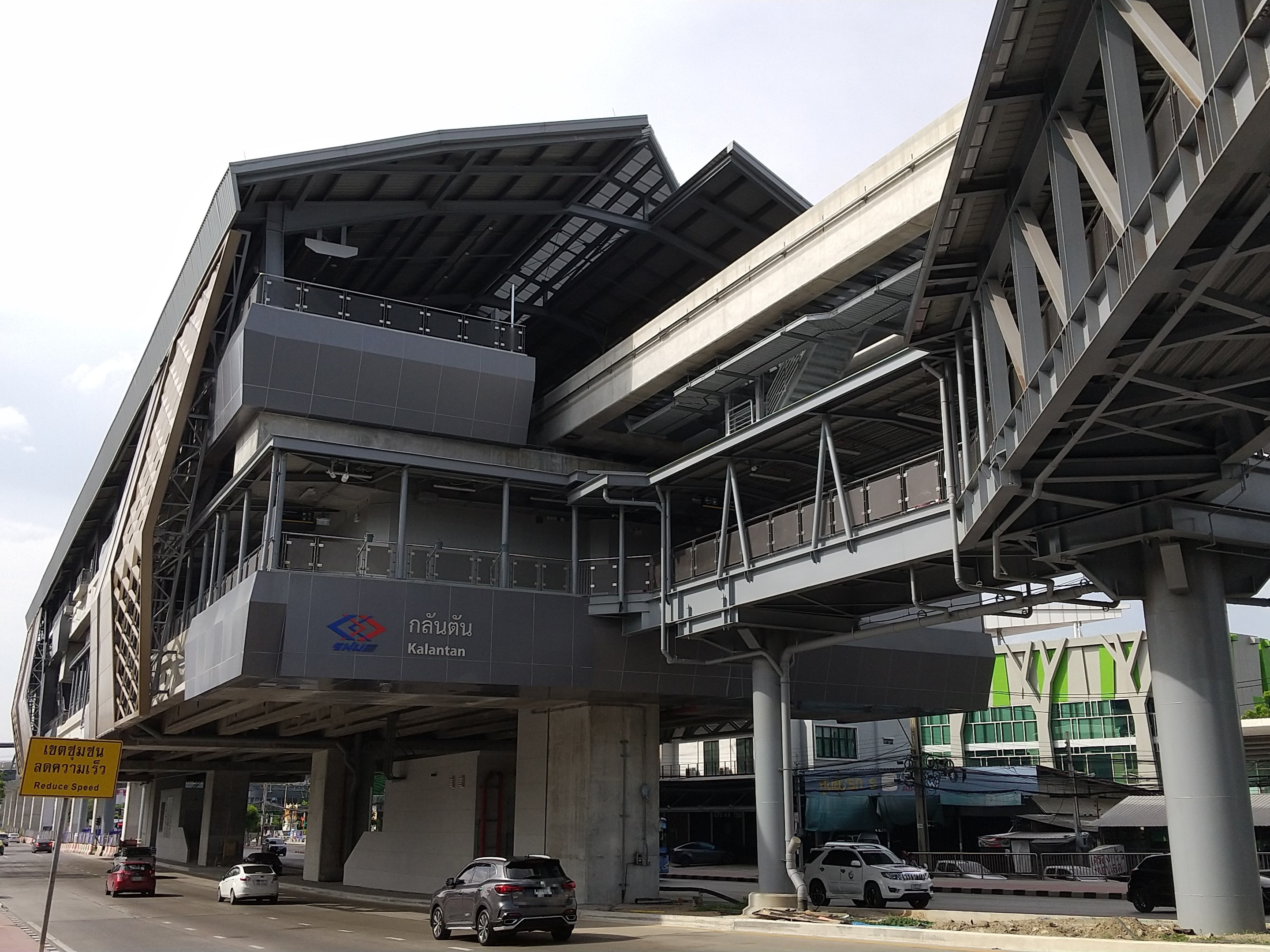

General information
- Location: Suan Luang District, Bangkok, Thailand
- Coordinates: 13.7253°N 100.6418°E
- System: MRT
- Owner: Mass Rapid Transit Authority of Thailand (MRTA)
- Operator: Eastern Bangkok Monorail Company Limited (EBM)
- Line: Yellow Line

Other information
- Station code: YL12

History
- Opened: 3 June 2023; 3 years ago

Services
Preceding station	Metropolitan Rapid Transit	Following station
Hua Mak towards Lat Phrao	Yellow Line	Si Nut towards Samrong
Location

Kalantan station (Thai: สถานีกลันตัน, pronounced [sā.tʰǎː.nīː kā.lān.tān]) is a Bangkok MRT station on the Yellow Line. The station is located in front of Thanya Park shopping mall on Srinagarindra Road in Suan Luang District, Bangkok. The station has four entrances. It opened on 3 June 2023 as part of trial operations on the line between Samrong and Hua Mak.

== Naming ==
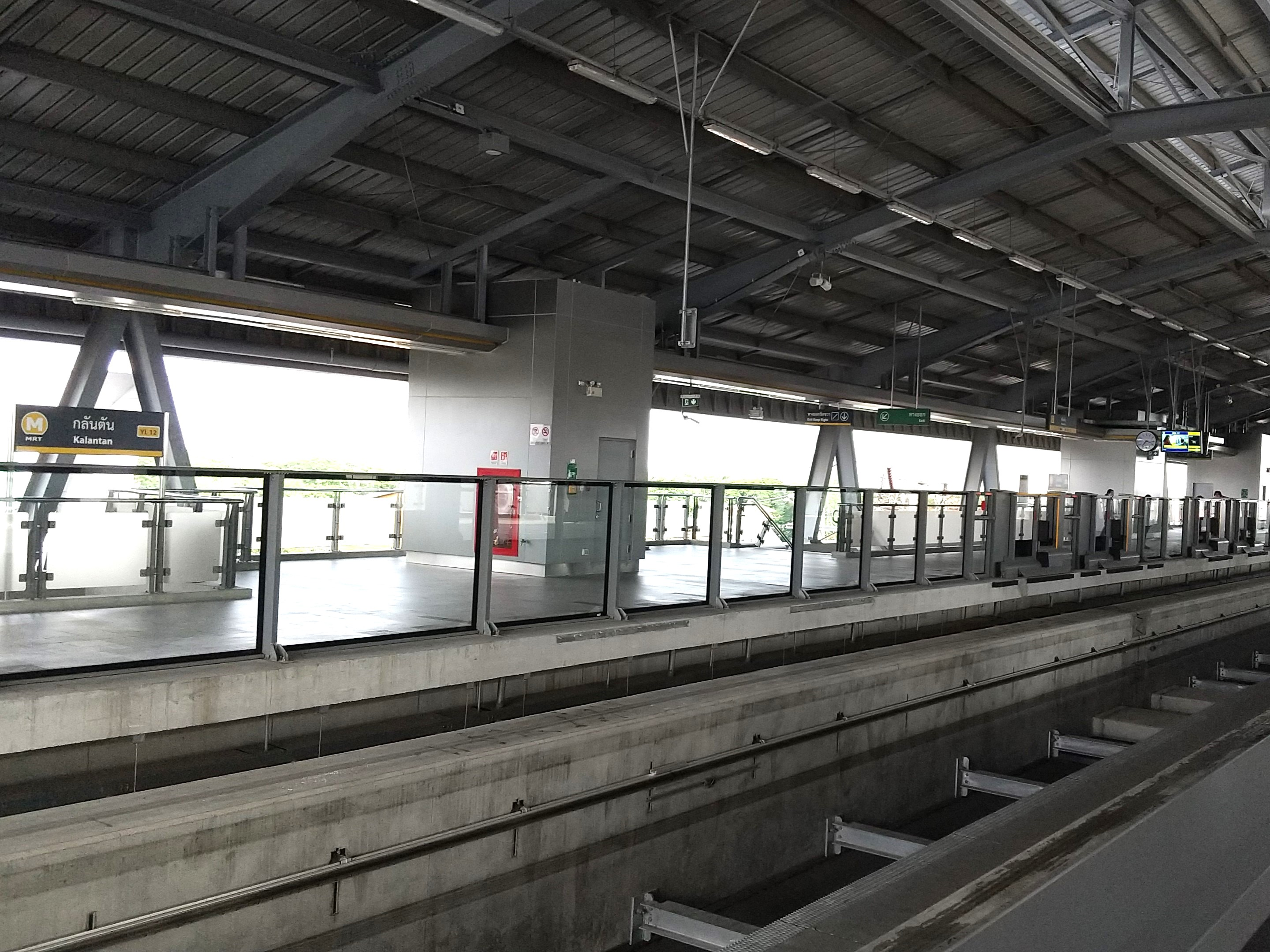
Platforms

The naming of the station was heavily debated online in June 2022, as some considered the name's similarity to that of Kelantan state in Malaysia inappropriate. The station's name however was retained due to historical reasons. "Khlong Kalantan" was a canal constructed during the reign of King Rama III as a link between Khlong Saen Saep and Khlong Phra Khanong to supplement troop transport for the Siamese-Vietnamese wars. The workers were from the tributary Patani Kingdom which was ruled by the Kelantanese dynasty, and thus the canal was named 'Kalantan' canal, reflective of those who dug it. Nearby infrastructure also bear the name 'Kalantan' such as Khlong Kalantan School. The name later would get shortened from 'Khlong Kalantan' to simply 'Khlong Tan'.

== Station layout ==
U3	Side platform, doors will open on the left
U3	Platform 1	Yellow towards Samrong (Si Nut)
U3	Platform 2	Yellow towards Lat Phrao (Hua Mak)
U3	Side platform, doors will open on the left
U2	Concourse	Exit 1-4, Ticket machines
G	-	Bus stop, Thanya Park Srinakarin
