= Future Park =

Future Park may refer to:

- Future Park Rangsit; a shopping mall in Pathum Thani, Thailand.
- Seacon Bangkae; a shopping mall in Bangkok, Thailand; initially named as Future Park Bangkae
- Jamuna Future Park; a shopping mall in Dhaka, Bangladesh
