= Seacon Development =

Retail company in Thailand

Seacon Development Co. Ltd.
- Industry: Retailing
- Headquarters: Bangkok, Thailand
- Products: Shopping Malls, Office buildings
- Website: www.seaconsqaure.com

Seacon Development Co. Ltd is a Bangkok based retail and development company. The company is best known for managing Seacon Square & Seacon Bangkae, two large shopping malls in Bangkok, Thailand.
