= 19th World Science Fiction Convention =

19th Worldcon (1961)

Seacon, the 19th World Science Fiction Convention
- Genre: Science fiction
- Dates: 2–4 September 1961
- Venue: Hyatt House Hotel
- Location: Seattle, Washington
- Country: United States
- Attendance: 270 to 300
- Filing status: Non-profit

The 19th World Science Fiction Convention (Worldcon), also known as Seacon, was held on 2–4 September 1961 at the Hyatt House Hotel in Seattle, Washington, United States.

The convention chair was Wally Weber.

== Participants ==
Attendance was approximately 270 to 300.

=== Guests of honor ===
- Robert A. Heinlein
- Harlan Ellison (toastmaster)

Heinlein gave a speech titled "The Future Revisited". He was previously the guest of honor at the 3rd Worldcon, and would again be the guest of honor at the 34th Worldcon.

== Awards ==
The World Science Fiction Society administers and presents the Hugo Awards, the oldest and most noteworthy award for science fiction. Selection of the recipients is by vote of the Worldcon members. Categories include novels and short fiction, artwork, dramatic presentations, and various professional and fandom activities.

Other awards may be presented at Worldcon at the discretion of the individual convention committee. This has often included the national SF awards of the host country, such as the Japanese Seiun Awards as part of Nippon 2007, and the Prix Aurora Awards as part of Anticipation in 2009. The Astounding Award for Best New Writer and the Sidewise Award, though not sponsored by the Worldcon, are usually presented, as well as the Chesley Awards, the Prometheus Award, and others. In 2021, the Nommo Awards began presenting at Worldcon.

=== 1961 Hugo Awards ===
- Best Novel: A Canticle for Leibowitz by Walter M. Miller, Jr. [J. B. Lippincott, 1959]
- Best Short Story: "The Longest Voyage" by Poul Anderson [Analog Dec 1960]
- Best Dramatic Presentation: The Twilight Zone (TV series) by Rod Serling [CBS]
- Best Professional Magazine: Astounding/Analog edited by John W. Campbell, Jr.
- Best Professional Artist: Ed Emshwiller
- Best Fanzine: Who Killed Science Fiction?, one-shot, edited by Earl Kemp

== See also ==
- Hugo Award
- Science fiction
- Speculative fiction
- World Science Fiction Society
- Worldcon

Preceded by 18th World Science Fiction Convention; Pittcon I in Pittsburgh, Pennsylvania, United States (1960)	List of Worldcons; 19th World Science Fiction Convention; Seacon in Seattle, Washington, United States (1961)	Succeeded by 20th World Science Fiction Convention; Chicon III in Chicago, Illinois, United States (1962)
