= Seacon Bangkae =

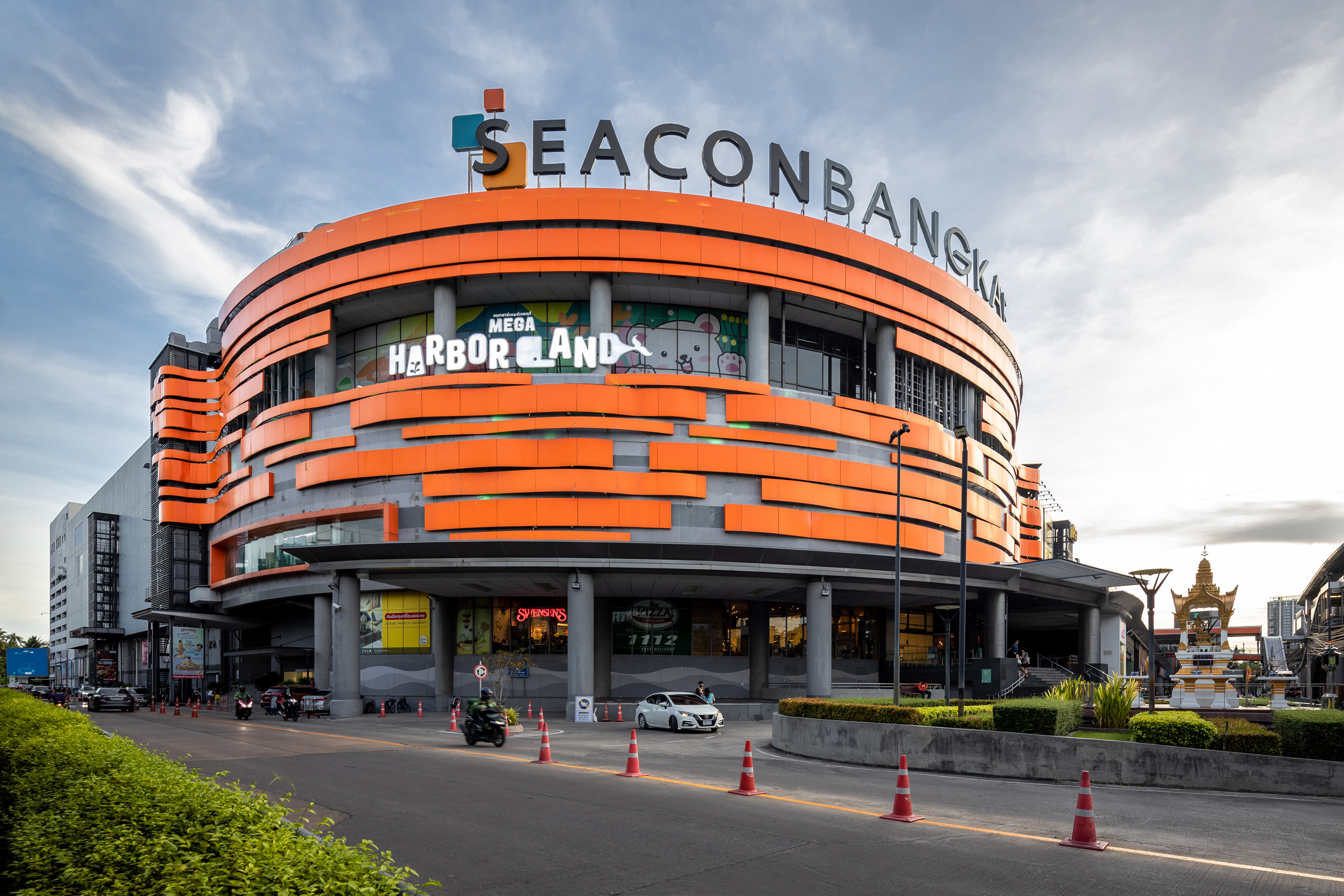
- Seacon Bangkae
- Location: Phasi Charoen, Bangkok, Thailand
- Coordinates: 13.7127°N 100.4352°E
- Address: 607 Phet Kasem Road, Bangwa
- Opened: December 1, 1993 (Future Park Bangkae); September 15, 2012 (Seacon Bangkae)
- Developer: Seacon Development
- Owner: Seacon Development
- Num. of stores: 300+
- Floor area: 300,000 square metres (3,200,000 sq ft)
- Floors: 6

Seacon Bangkae is a shopping mall in Phasi Charoen district, Bangkok, Thailand. Originally named Future Park Bangkae during its first 16 years, when it was owned by Univest Group. On August 1, 2010, Seacon Bangkae Co., Ltd acquired this property and renovation to the old building began in December 2010. Around 70 percent of the renovation process was done to the old building. After that, it was publicly opened on September 15, 2012. The mall is located on over 16 acres (6.5 ha) on Phet Kasem Road, in Phasi Charoen district. Wave-shaped modern contemporary design was the concept of Seacon Bangkae.

Seacon Bangkae has five floors with 130,000 m^{2} (1,400,000 sq ft) with over 300 stores for retail. It also has three multi-purpose area for activities and events. The parking area can accommodate more than 4,000 cars. It is served by the Phasi Charoen MRT station of the Blue Line.

== Facilities ==
Seacon Bangkae is separated into several sections, such as Sports World, Season Fashion Mall, Mobile Seacon, IT Seacon, The Rink Ice Arena, Mega HarborLand and Major Bangkae

- Stores in Central Group
  - Tops
  - B2S
  - Power Buy
  - Supersports
  - Office Mate
- Don Don Donki
- HomePro (Moved from M Lifestore Bangkae, Lotus Bangkae)
  - The Power
- Nitori
- Food Marche
- Sports World
- IT Seacon
- Season Fashion Mall
- The Rink Ice Arena
- Mega HarborLand Seacon Bangkae
- Major Bangkae 10 Cinemas (Old Grand EGV (After change name Bangkae Cineplex), currently a longest serving anchor tenant since Future Park Bangkae days)
