= Seacon Square =

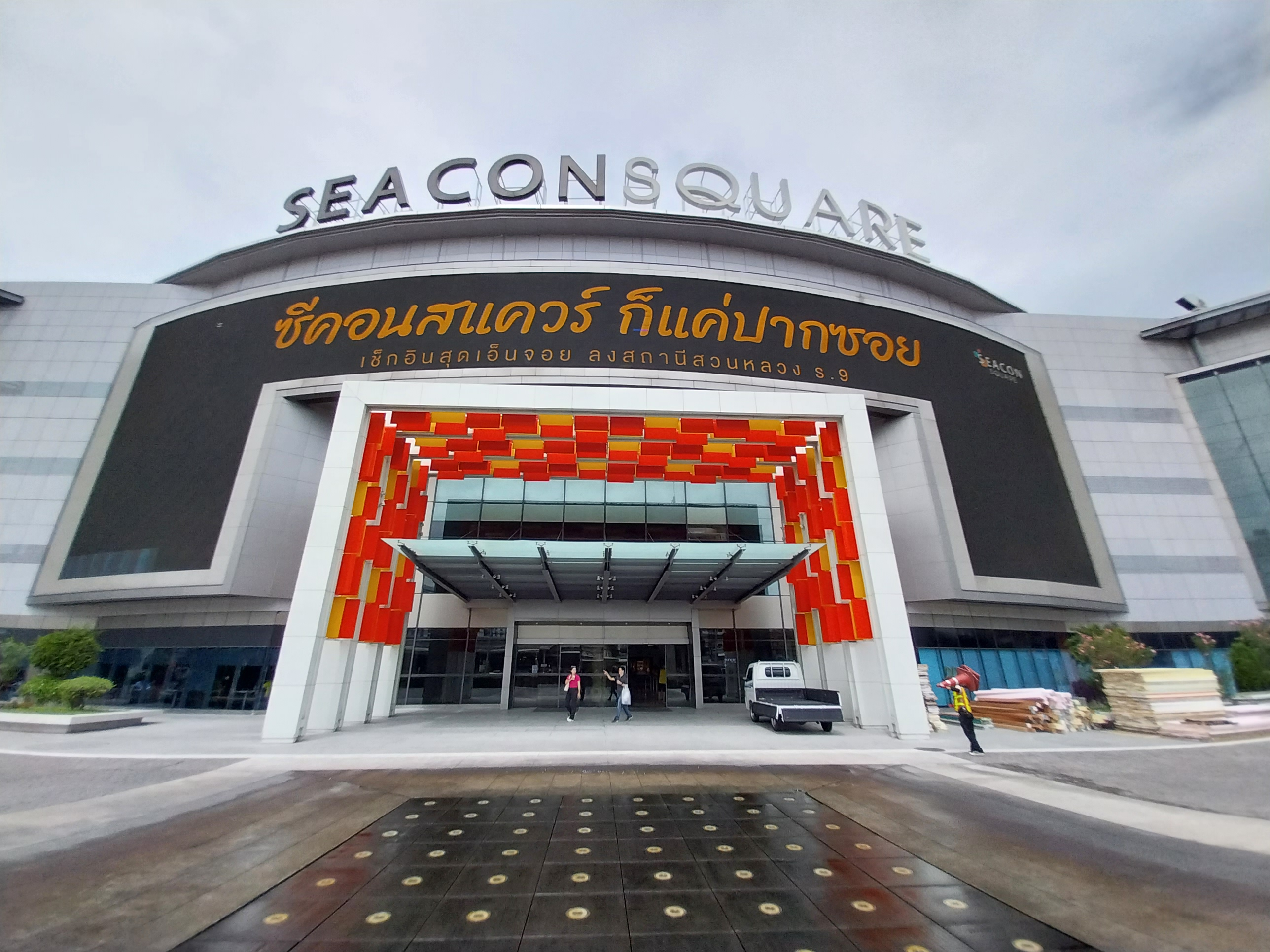
- Seacon Square in 2023
- Location: Prawet, Bangkok, Thailand
- Coordinates: 13°41′39″N 100°38′53″E
- Address: Srinagarindra Road
- Opened: September 4, 1994
- Developer: Seacon Development
- Owner: Seacon Development
- Num. of stores: 400+
- Num. of anchor tenants: 15
- Floor area: 500,000 square metres (5,400,000 sq ft)
- Floors: 7
- Public transit: MRT Suan Luang Rama IX station
- Website: www.seaconsquare.com

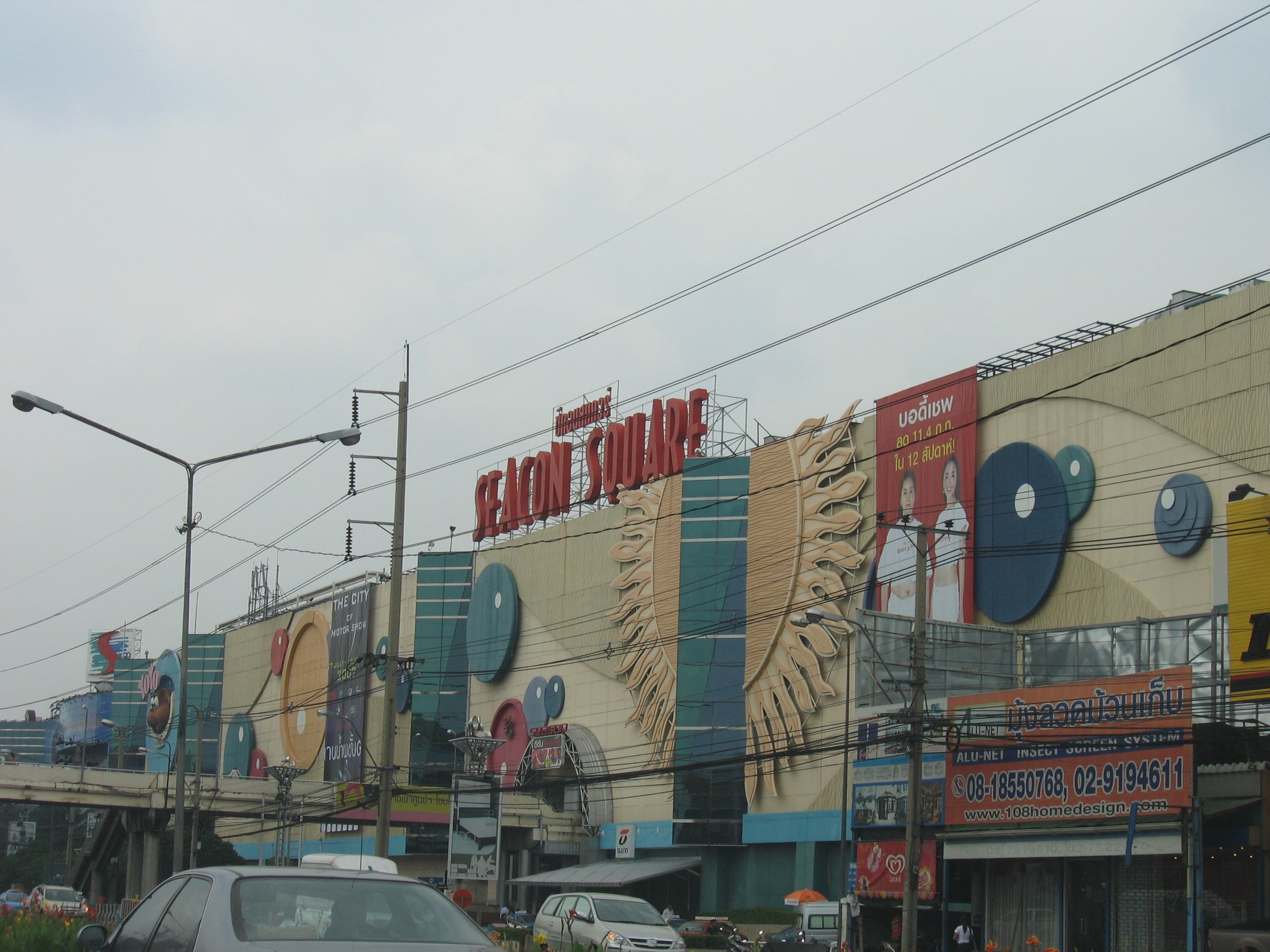
Exterior of the complex in 2007.

Seacon Square is a large indoor shopping mall in Prawet, Bangkok. It was opened in 1994 in a ceremony presided over by Princess Sirindhorn. The shopping center has a gross leasable area of 180,000 m^{2} (1,900,000 sq ft), a total area of 500,000 m^{2} (5,400,000 sq ft) and houses more than 300 stores. The building is 500 metres long, making it one of the largest shopping malls in Thailand. It opens daily at 10:00am.

It was served by Suan Luang Rama IX MRT station on the MRT Yellow Line since 2023.

== Bombing attempt ==
Seacon Square was a target in the 2006 Bangkok bombings on December 31, 2006. A bomb was found in a trash can near a gold shop on the mall's ground floor. The bomb was removed to the Basement 2 parking lot where it exploded without causing injuries.

== See also ==
- List of shopping malls in Bangkok
- List of shopping malls in Thailand
