= Hua Mak station =

Group of rail stations in Bangkok, Thailand

Hua Mak หัวหมาก
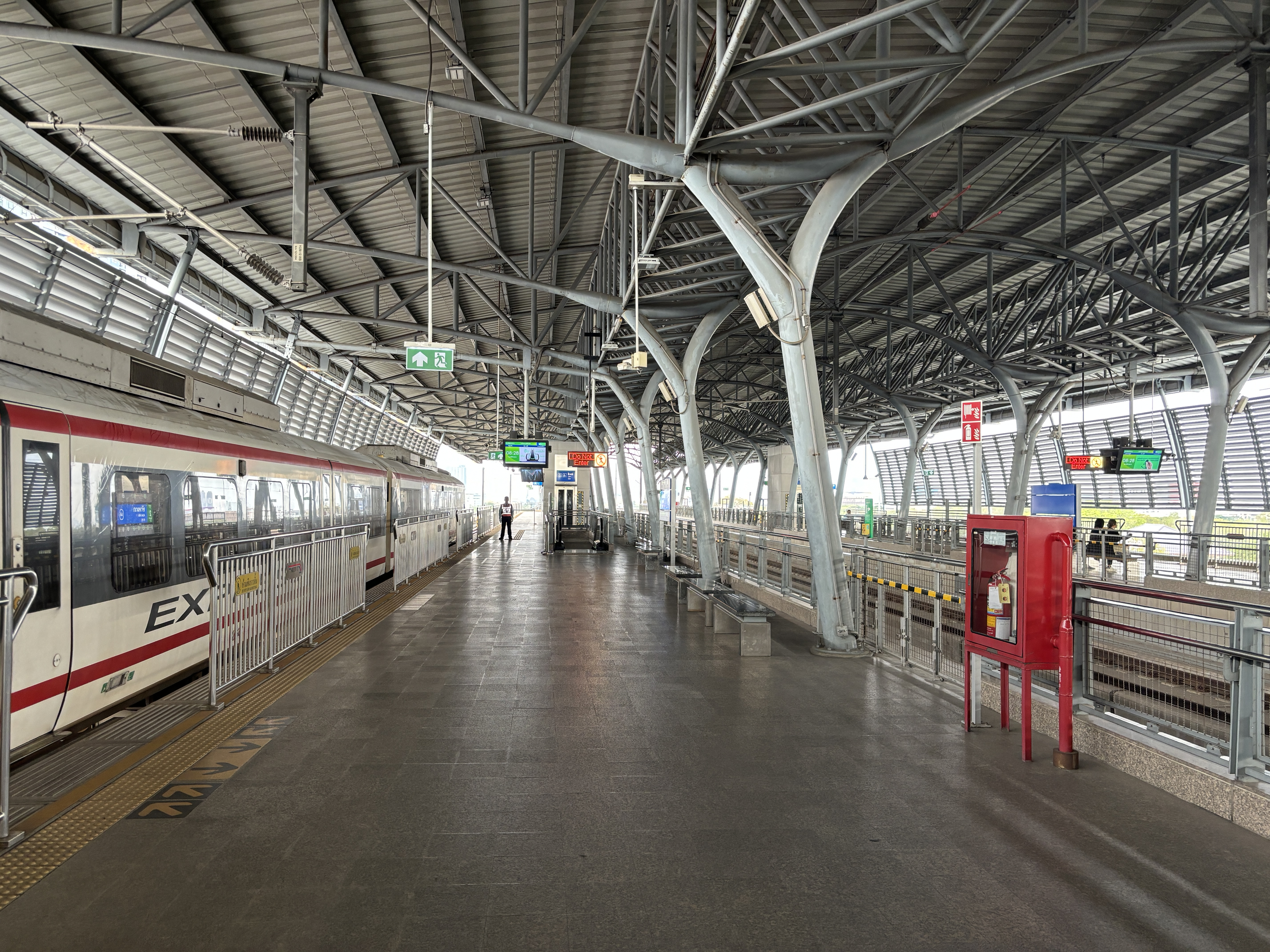
- Platforms of Hua Mak Airport Rail Link station

General information
- Location: Suan Luang District; Bangkok; Thailand
- System: ARL MRT
- Owner: State Railway of Thailand; Mass Rapid Transit Authority of Thailand
- Operator: State Railway of Thailand (SRT); Asia Era One Company Limited (AERA1) (ARL); Eastern Bangkok Monorail Company Limited (EBM) (MRT)
- Manager: Ministry of Transport
- Platforms: 3 (SRT); 2 (ARL); 2 (MRT)

Construction
- Structure type: At-grade (SRT); Elevated (ARL, MRT)
- Parking: Yes
- Accessible: Yes

Other information
- Station code: หม./3010 (SRT); A4 (ARL); YL11 (MRT)

History
- Opened: 24 January 1907; 119 years ago (SRT); 23 August 2010; 16 years ago (ARL); 3 June 2023; 3 years ago (MRT)
- Electrified: 25 kV 50 Hz AC (ARL); 750 V DC (MRT)
- Former names: Ban Hua Mak, Phatthanakan

Services
Preceding station	State Railway of Thailand	Following station
Sukhumvit 71 Halt towards Hua Lamphong	Eastern Line	Ban Thap Chang towards Chuk Samet or Poipet (Cambodia)
Preceding station	Airport Rail Link	Following station
Ramkhamhaeng towards Phaya Thai	City Line	Ban Thap Chang towards Suvarnabhumi
Preceding station	Metropolitan Rapid Transit	Following station
Si Kritha towards Lat Phrao	Yellow Line	Kalantan towards Samrong
Location

Hua Mak station (Thai: สถานีหัวหมาก, pronounced [sā.tʰǎː.nīː hǔa màːk]) is a station on the Eastern Line of the State Railway of Thailand, an Airport Rail Link station and an MRT station on the Yellow Line, located on Srinagarindra Road in Phatthanakan Subdistrict, Suan Luang District, Bangkok. Three rail operators run the station complex separately at their respective stations, with no paid area integration between the three stations.

== History ==
Hua Mak opened as "Ban Hua Mak" railway station on 24 January 1907 on the Eastern Line between Bangkok (Hua Lamphong) and Chachoengsao Junction, operated by the State Railway of Thailand. It is unknown when the station was renamed to Hua Mak. The original wooden building was demolished to make way for the construction of the Airport Rail Link.

The ARL station opened on 23 August 2010. The ARL is intended to be the backbone of the future High Speed Rail line (HSR) to Chonburi and Rayong. This would use the current ARL tracks, and would connect all three nearby airports; starting at Don Mueang International Airport and passing through Krung Thep Aphiwat Central Terminal, Makkasan Station, Suvarnabhumi Airport, Chachoengsao, Chonburi, Si Racha, Pattaya and terminating at U-Tapao International Airport.

Construction of the MRT Yellow Line began in March 2018 and a station was to be placed near the railway station. It was initially named "Phatthanakan" station following the nearby Phatthanakan Road. However, on 6 September 2021, the Department of Rail Transport renamed it Hua Mak. Trial operations began on 3 June 2023 between Hua Mak and Samrong.

== Station layout ==
=== Yellow Line ===
U3	Side platform, doors will open on the left
U3	Platform 1	Yellow towards Samrong (Kalantan)
U3	Platform 2	Yellow towards Lat Phrao (Si Kritha)
U3	Side platform, doors will open on the left
U2	Concourse	Exit 1-4, Ticket machines
G	-	Bus stop, walkway to SRT station and ARL station

== Gallery ==
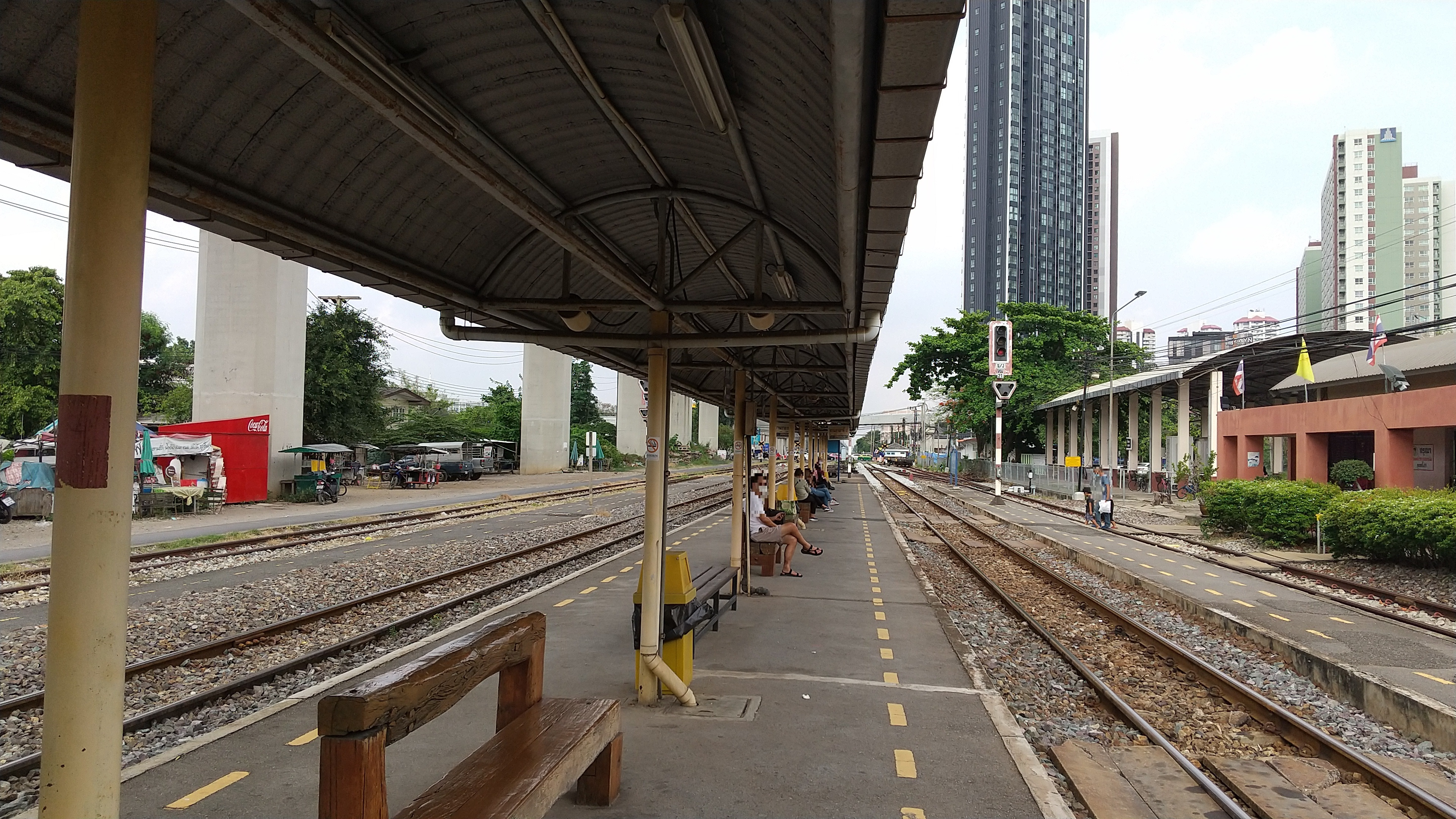
SRT station platforms

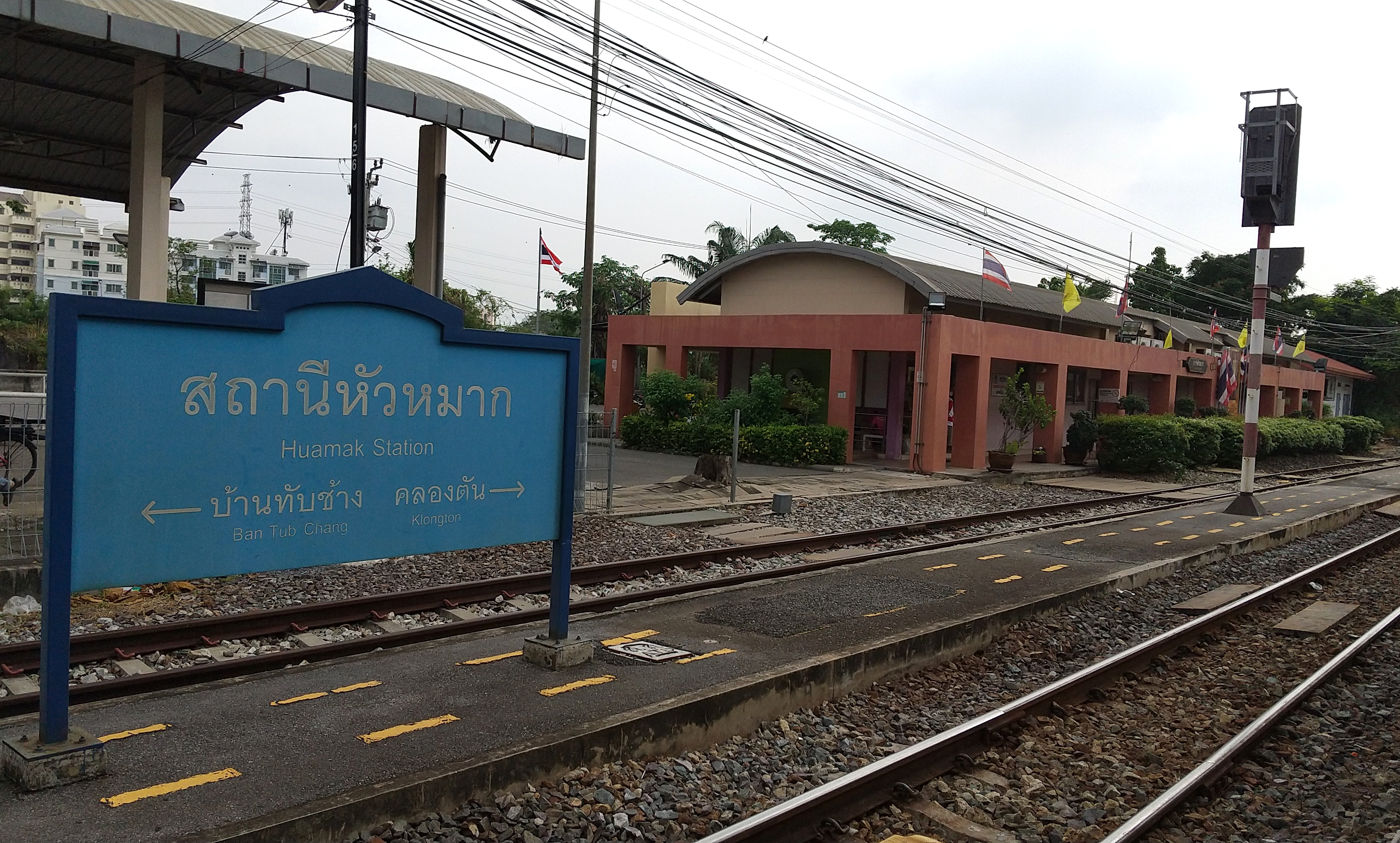
SRT station signage

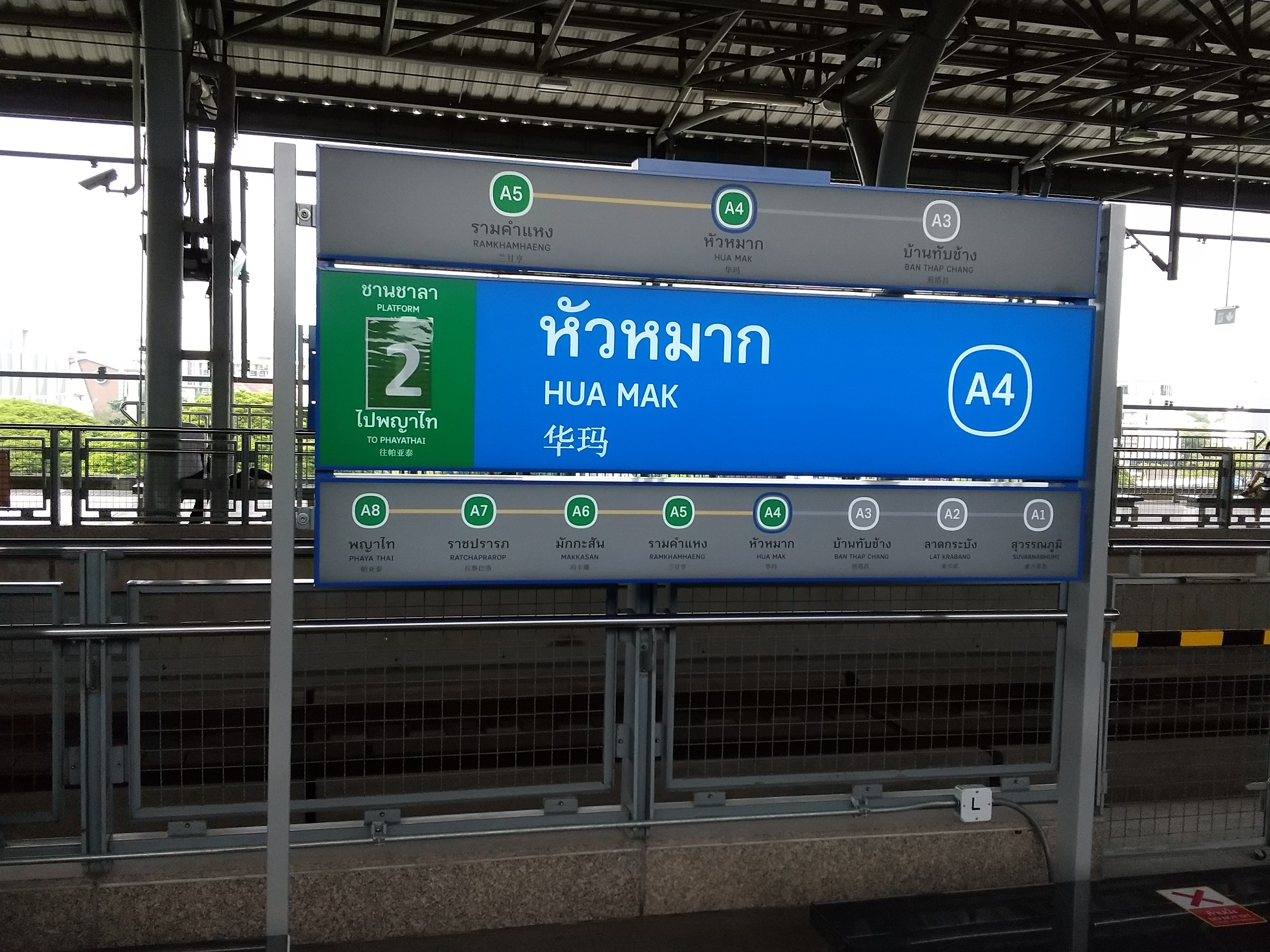
ARL station signage after AERA took over operations

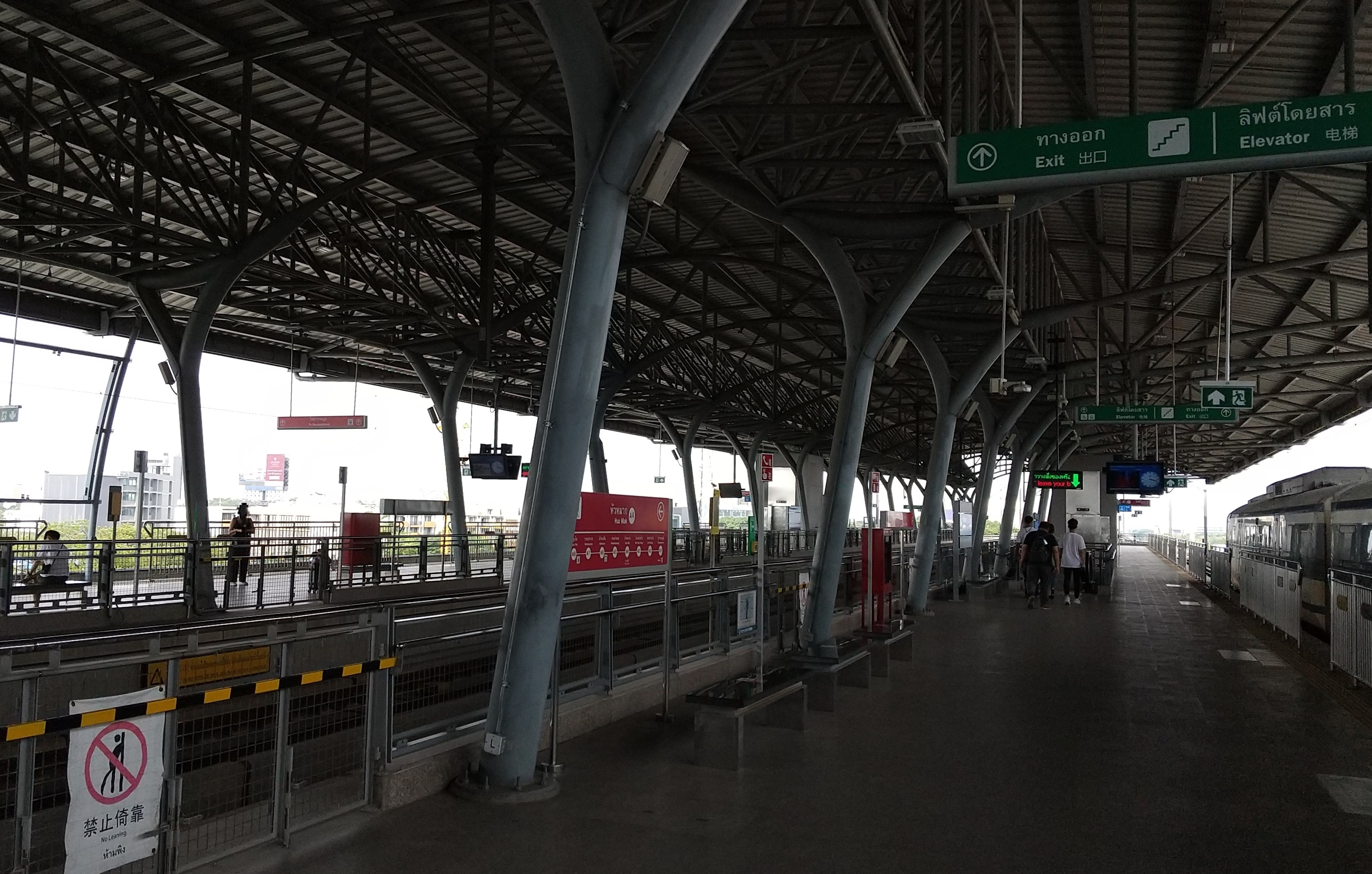
ARL station with former SRTET signage

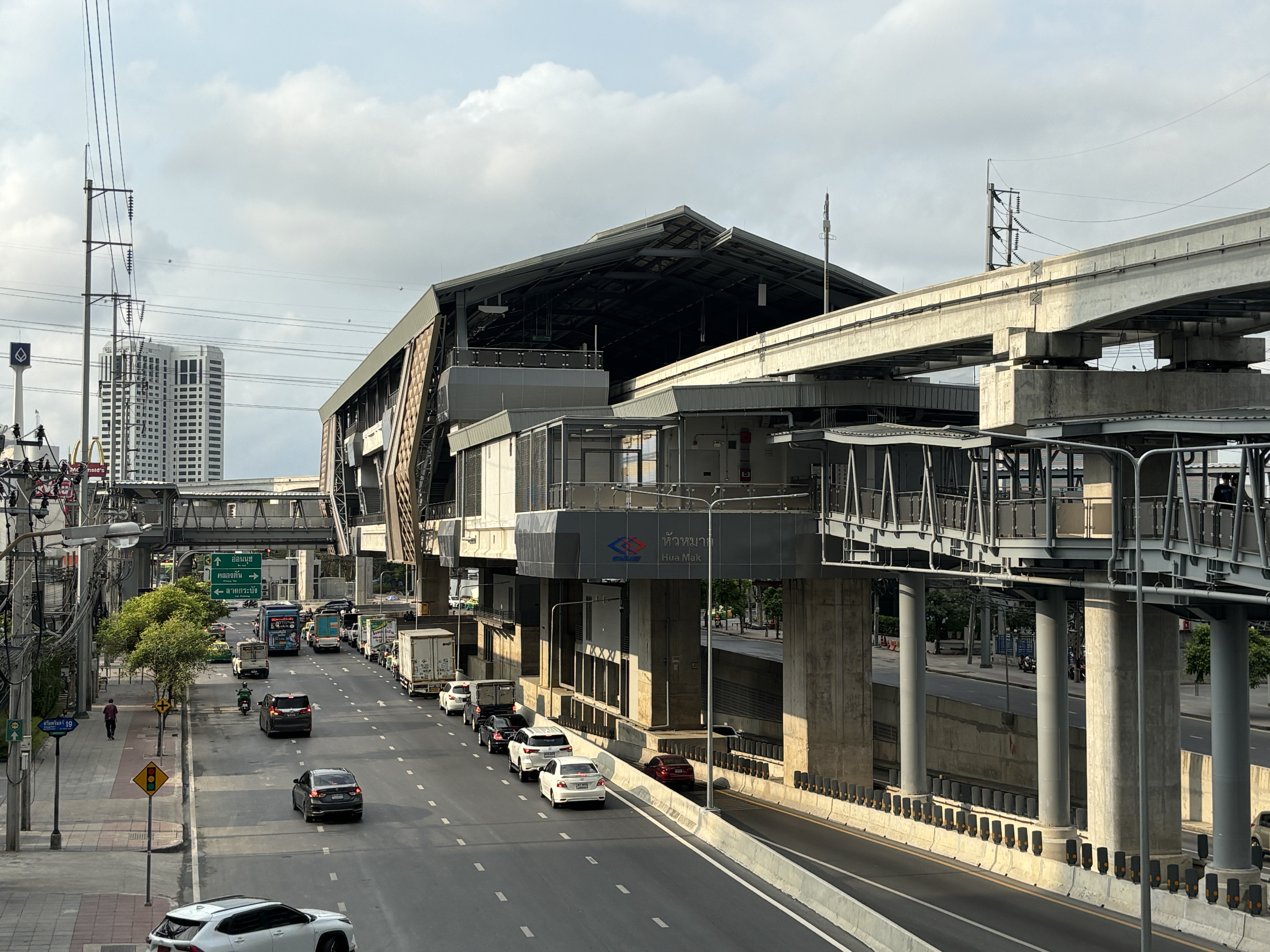
MRT Station Building

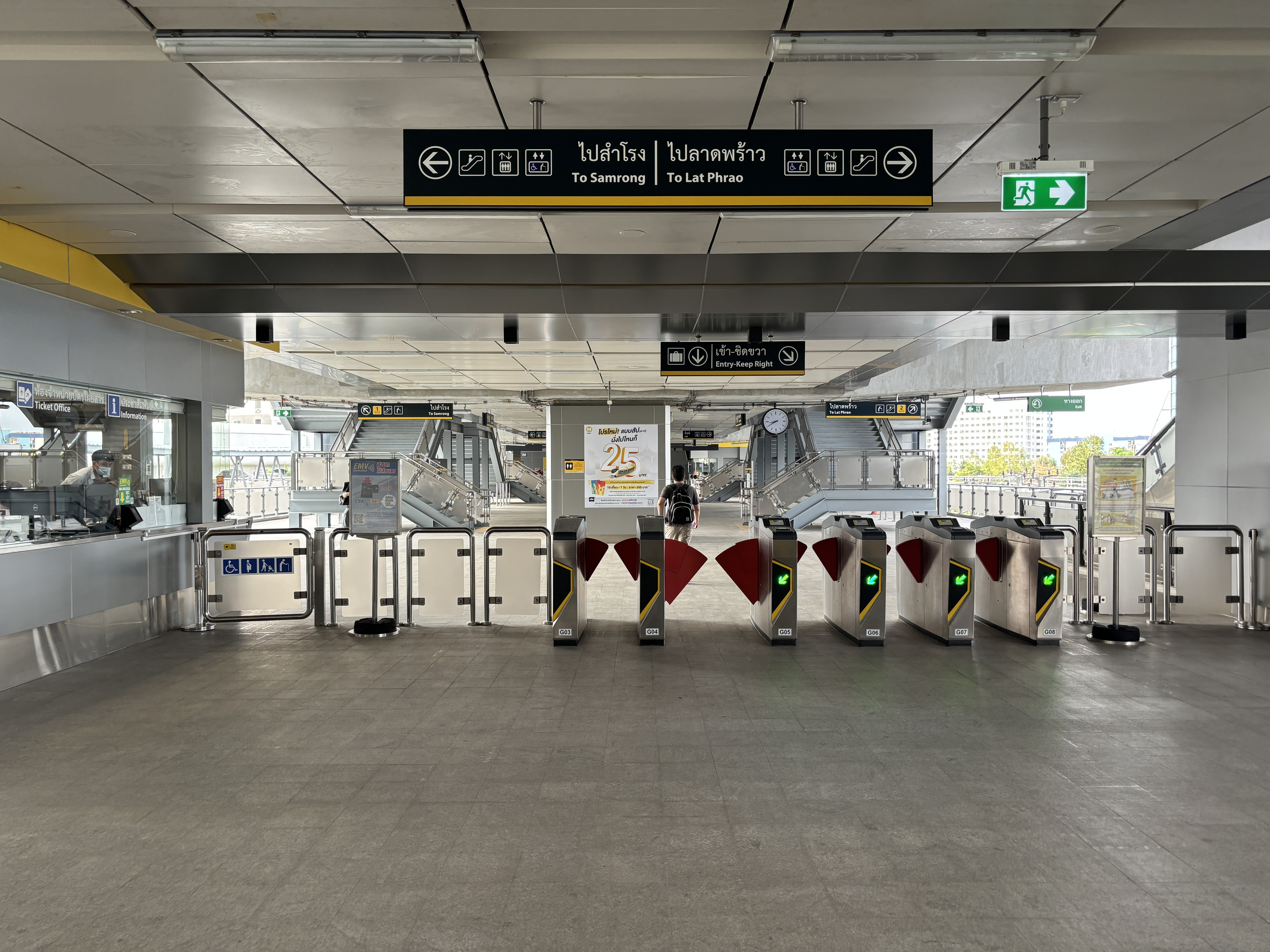
MRT Concourse

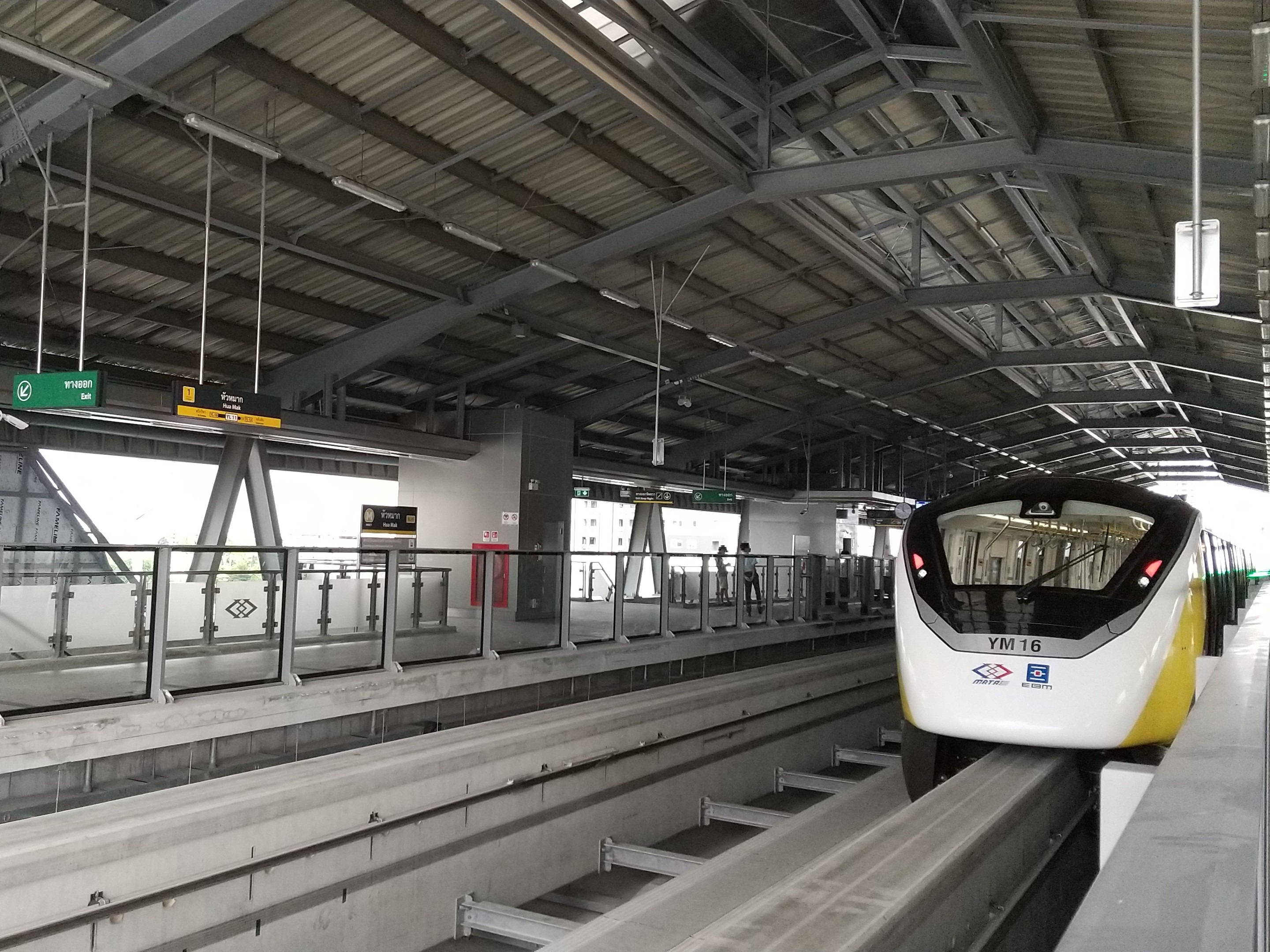
MRT platforms with monorail train

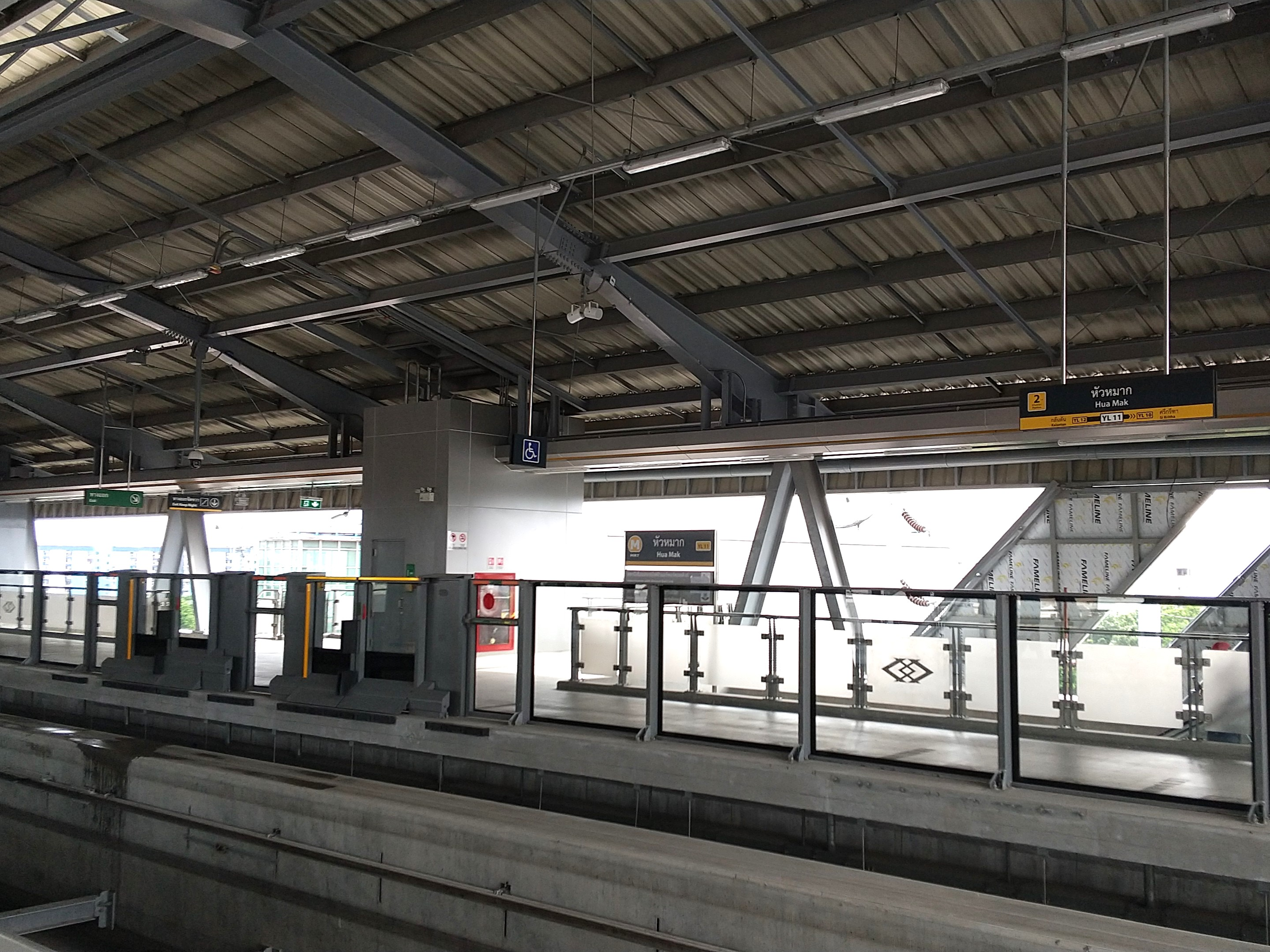
MRT platforms

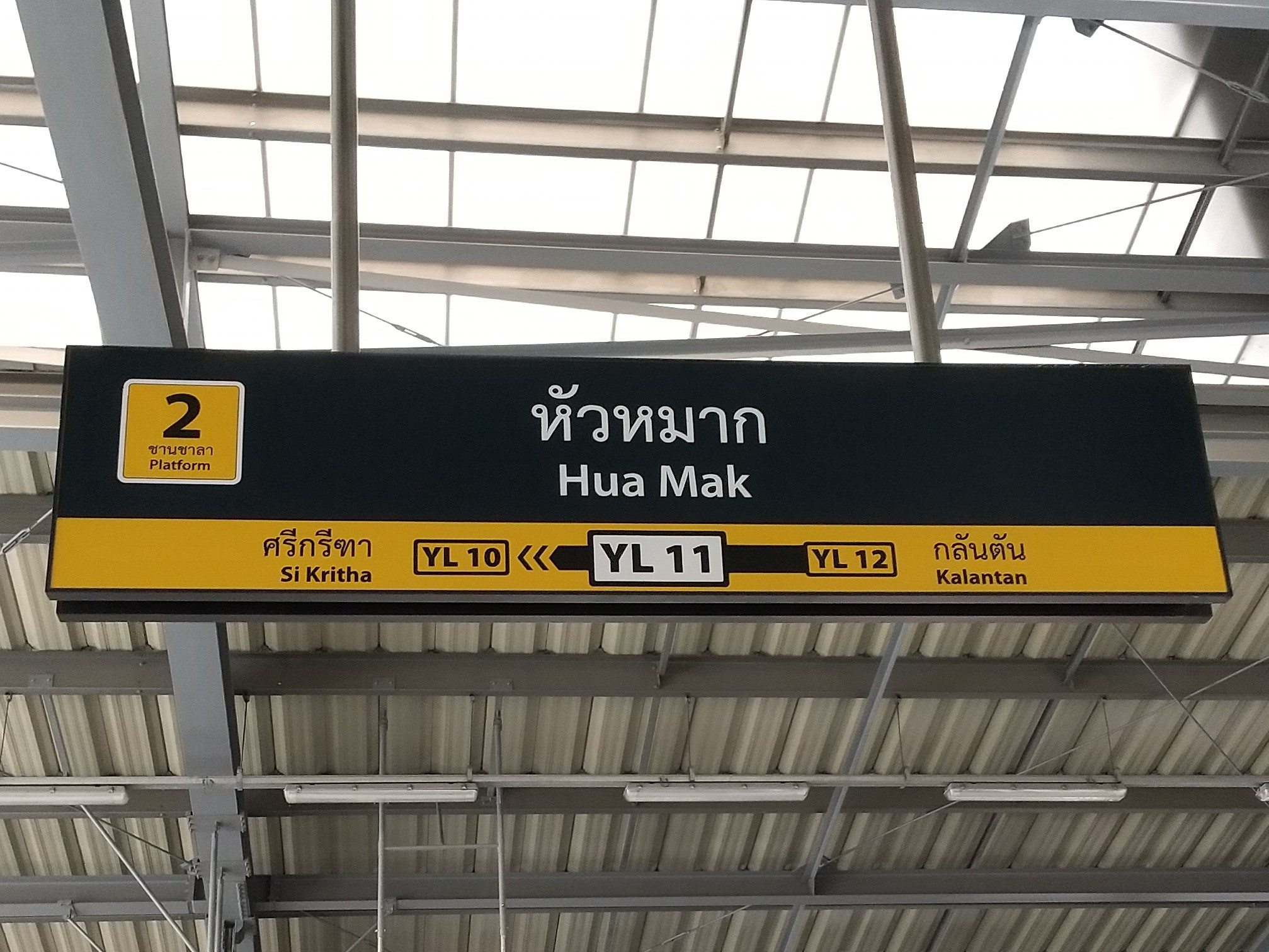
MRT signage
