= Srinagarindra Road =

Road in Thailand

Coordinates: 13°40′50.47″N 100°37′42.2″E

National Highway 3344
- ทางหลวงแผ่นดินหมายเลข 3344
- Srinagarindra Road ถนนศรีนครินทร์
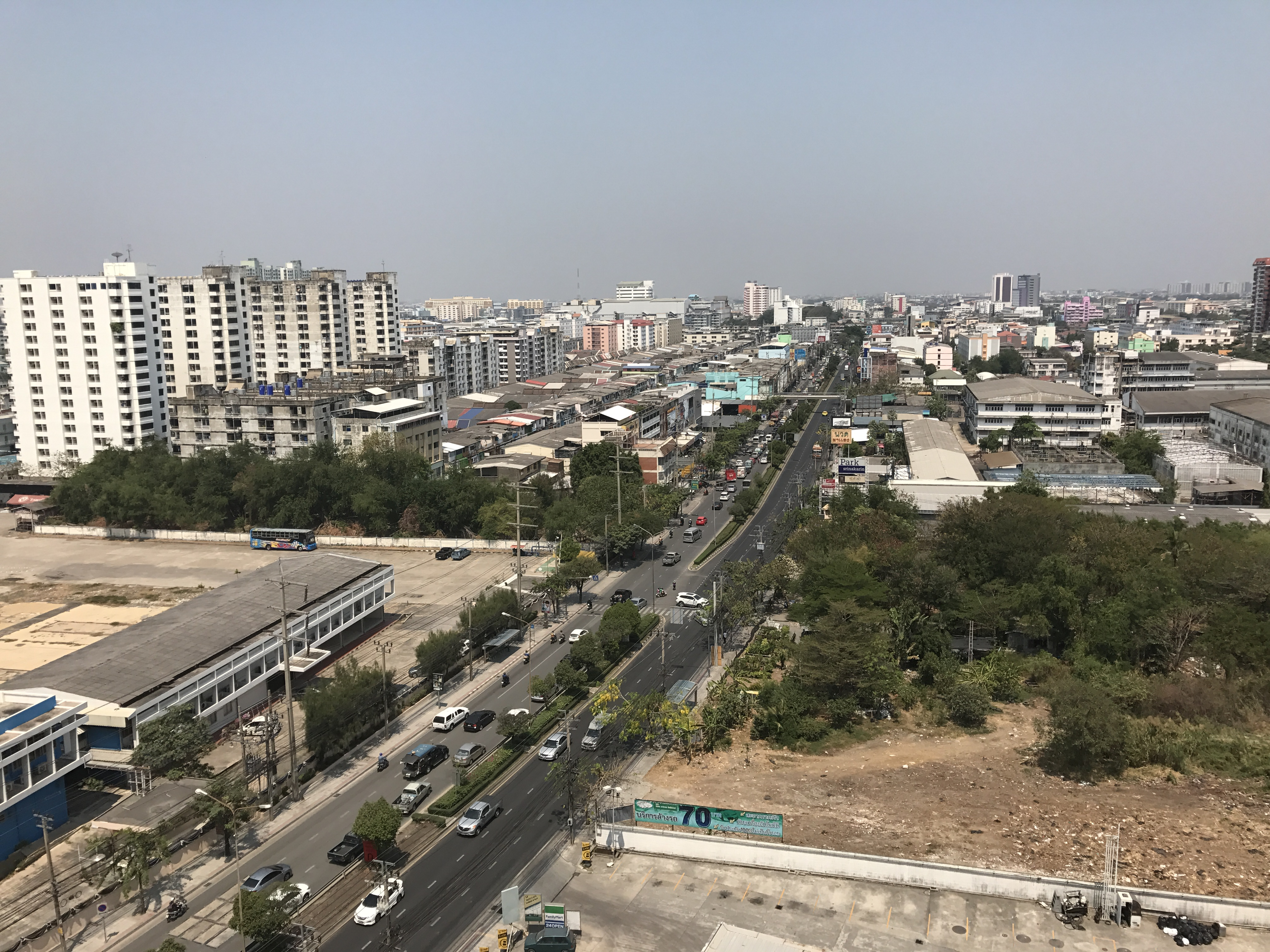
- Aerial view of Srinagarindra Road in the area of Bang Kapi District

Route information
- Maintained by Department of Highways
- Length: 20.181 km (12.540 mi)

Location
- Country: Thailand

Highway system
- Highways in Thailand; Motorways; Asian Highways

The Srinagarindra Road (Thai: ถนนศรีนครินทร์, RTGS: Thanon Si Nakharin, pronounced [tʰā.nǒn sǐː ná(ʔ).kʰā.rīn]) is a road named to honour the Princess Mother, Srinagarindra (the mother of King Bhumibol Adulyadej, the Great) during The Princess Mother's 7th Cycle Birthday Anniversary, 21 October 1984. It connects Bang Kapi District to Mueang Samut Prakan District. It has the route number 3344 as Thailand Highway Route 3344. The entire length from Bang Kapi to Mueang Samut Prakan is 20.181 kilometres (12.540 mi).
