= Si Thepha MRT station =

Monorail station in Bangkok, Thailand

Si Thepha ศรีเทพา
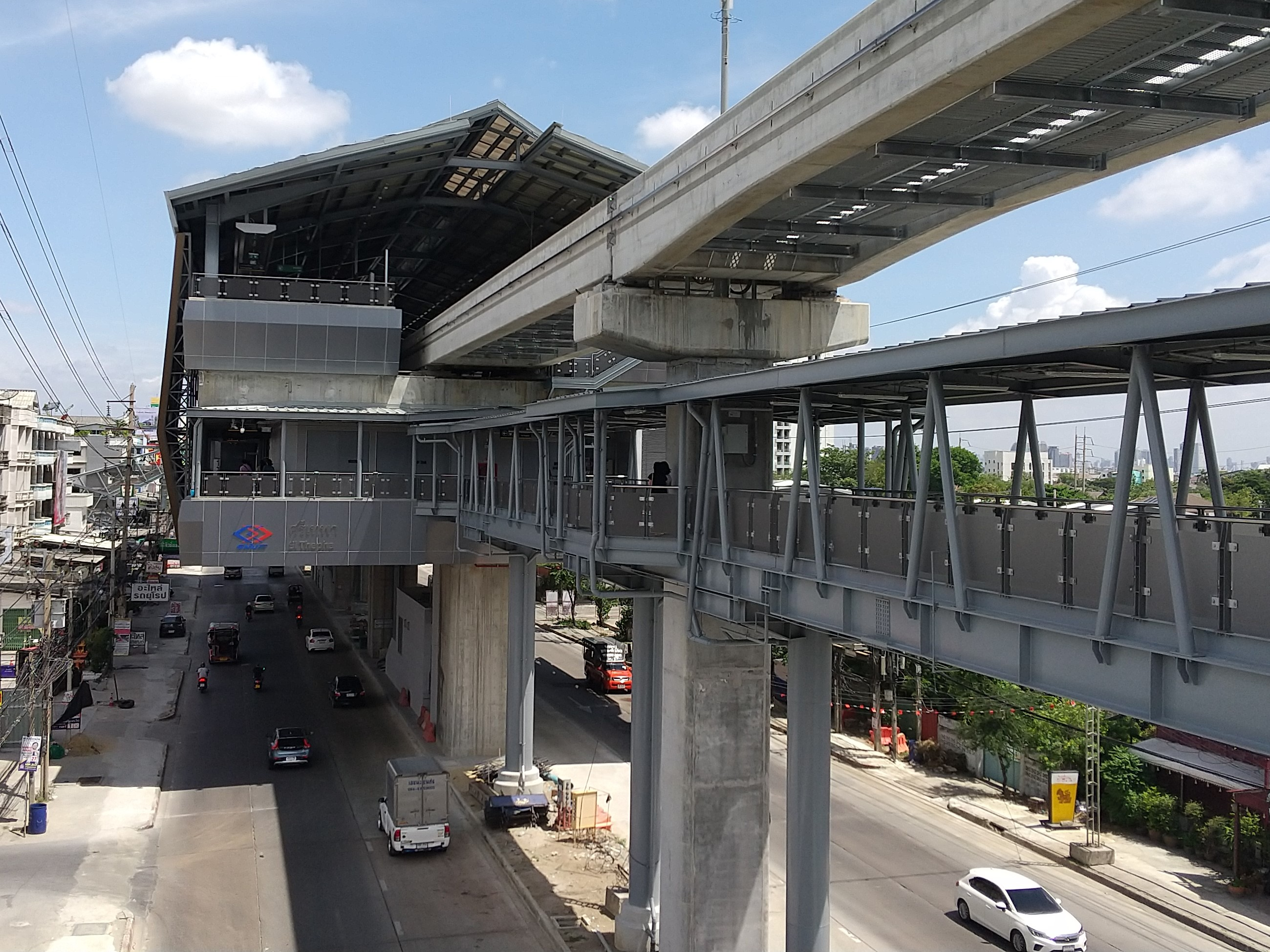

General information
- Location: Mueang Samut Prakan, Samut Prakan, Thailand
- Coordinates: 13.6299°N 100.6227°E
- System: MRT
- Owner: Mass Rapid Transit Authority of Thailand (MRTA)
- Operator: Eastern Bangkok Monorail Company Limited (EBM)
- Line: Yellow Line

Other information
- Station code: YL21

History
- Opened: 3 June 2023; 3 years ago

Services
Preceding station	Metropolitan Rapid Transit	Following station
Si Dan towards Lat Phrao	Yellow Line	Thipphawan towards Samrong
Location

Si Thepha station (Thai: สถานีศรีเทพา, pronounced [sā.tʰǎː.nīː sǐː tʰēː.pʰāː]) is a Bangkok MRT station on the Yellow Line. The station is located on Thepharak road in Samut Prakan Province and is a portmanteau of the name of Srinagarindra and Thepharak roads, which intersect adjacent to the station. The station has four entrances. It opened on 3 June 2023 as part of trial operations on the line between Samrong and Hua Mak.

== Station layout ==
U3	Side platform, doors will open on the left
U3	Platform 1	Yellow towards Samrong (Thipphawan)
U3	Platform 2	Yellow towards Lat Phrao (Si Dan)
U3	Side platform, doors will open on the left
U2	Concourse	Exit 1-4, Ticket machines
G	-	Bus stop

== Gallery ==
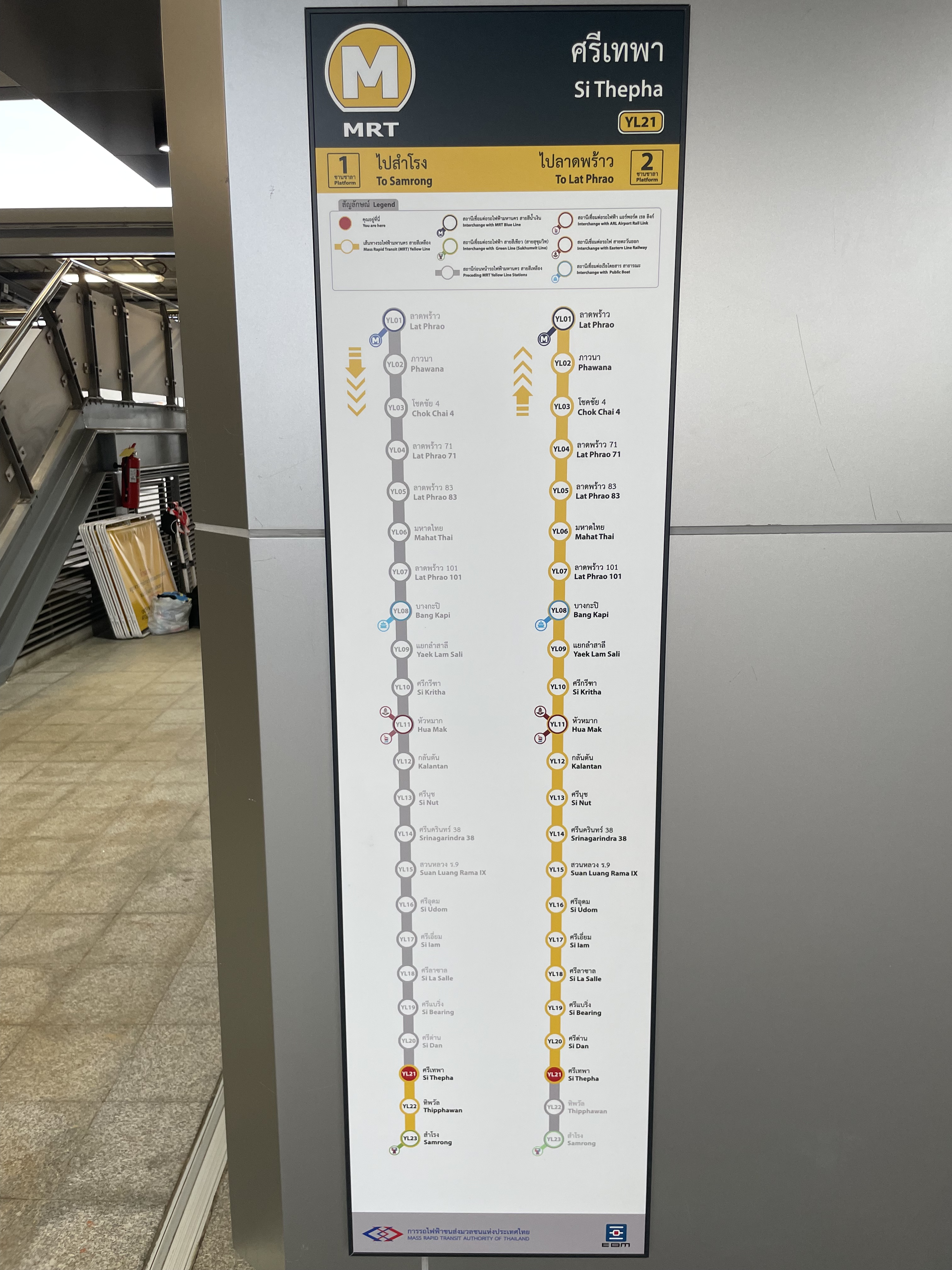
Route diagram shown at Si Thepha station

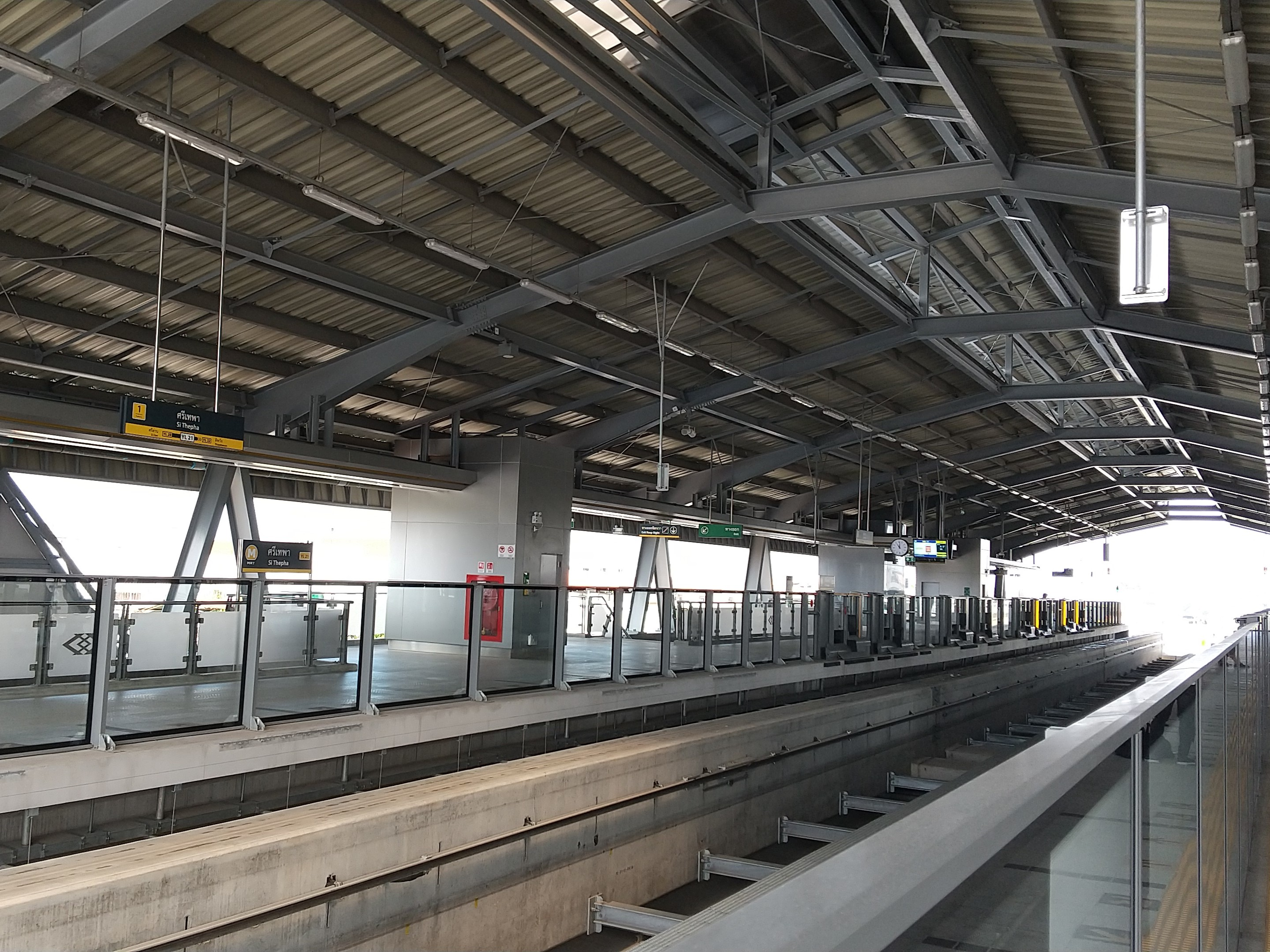
Platforms

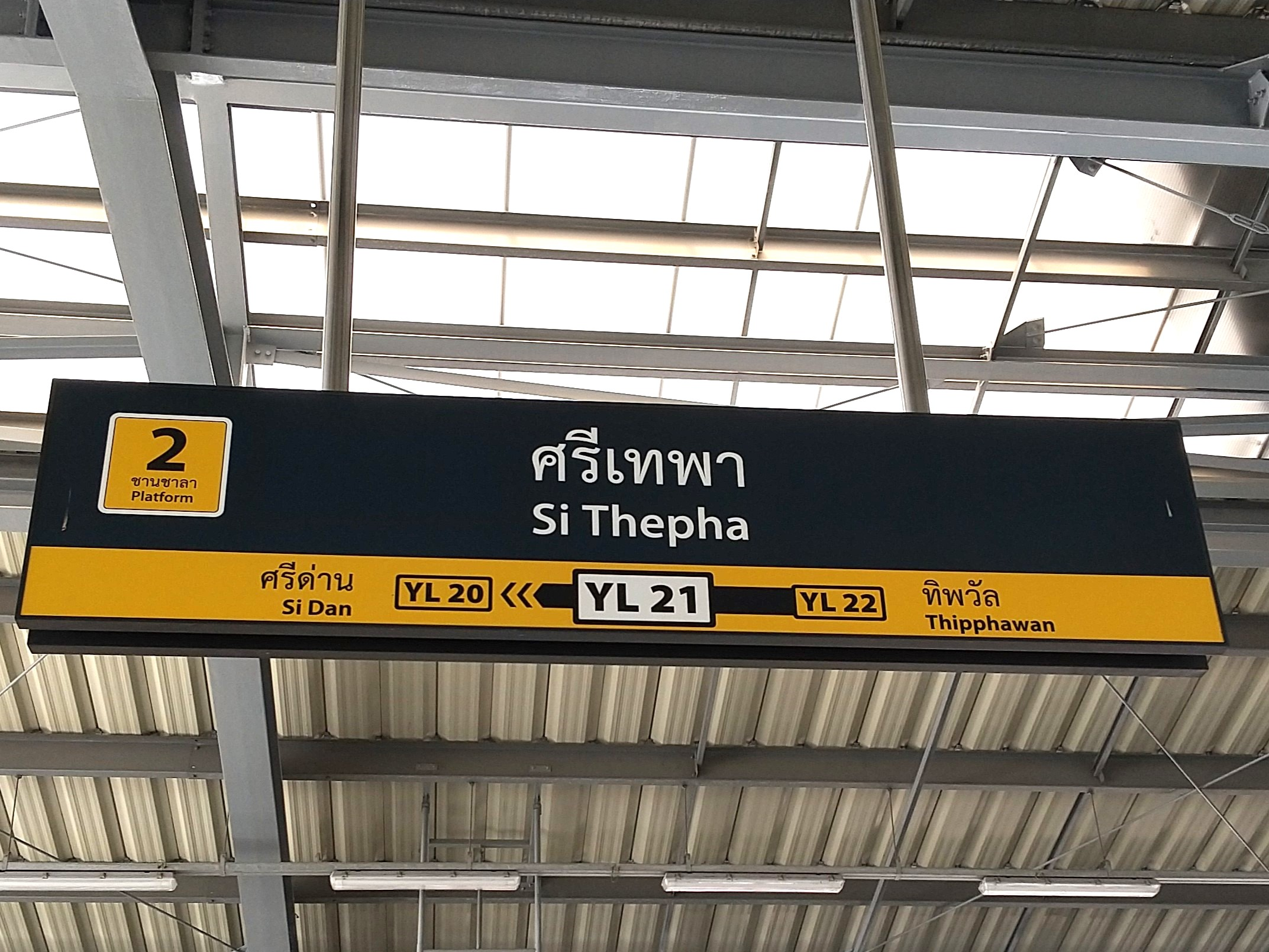
Signage

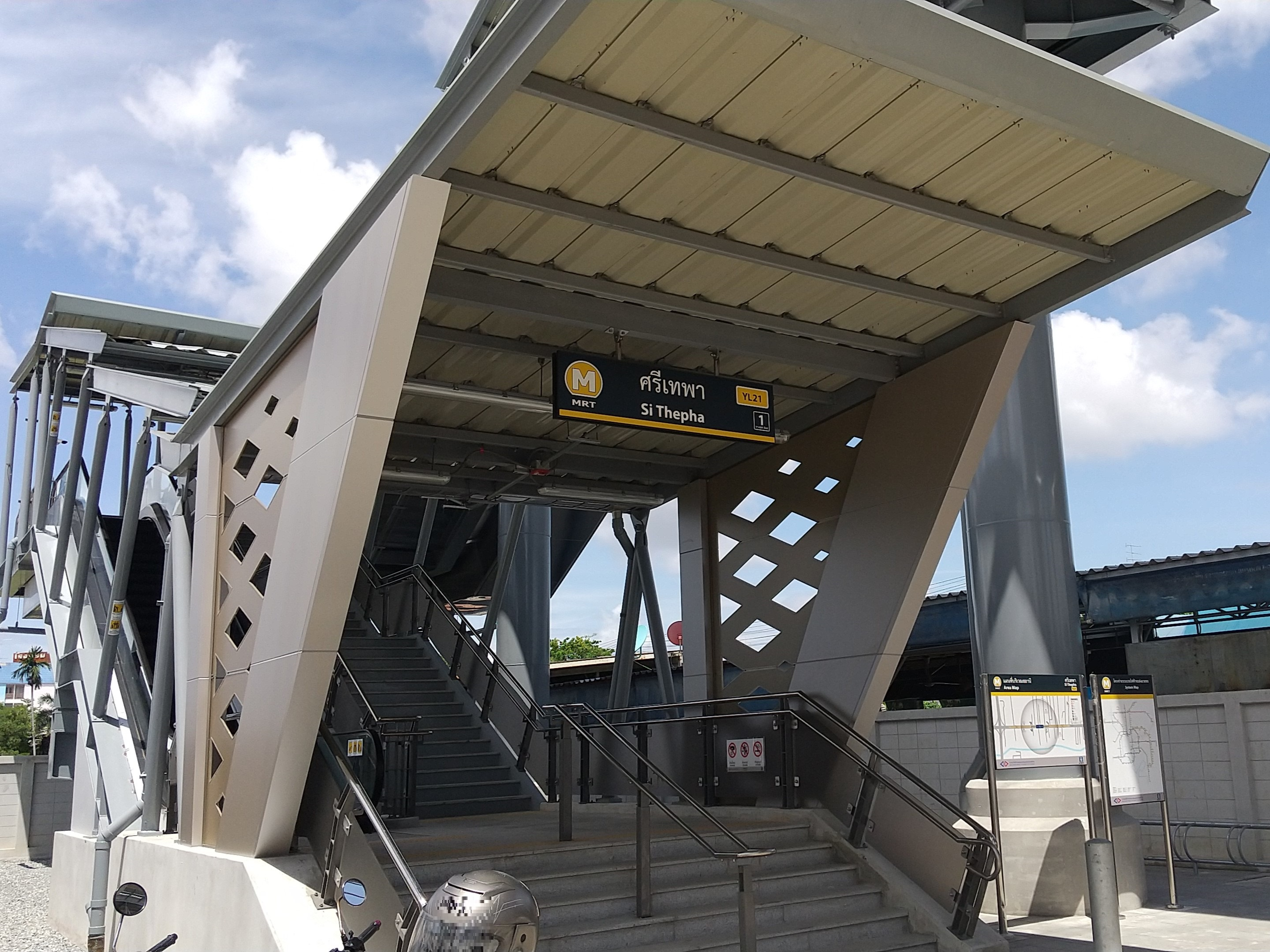
Station exit
