= Yellow Line (Bangkok) =

Monorail line in Thailand

MRT Yellow Line สายสีเหลือง

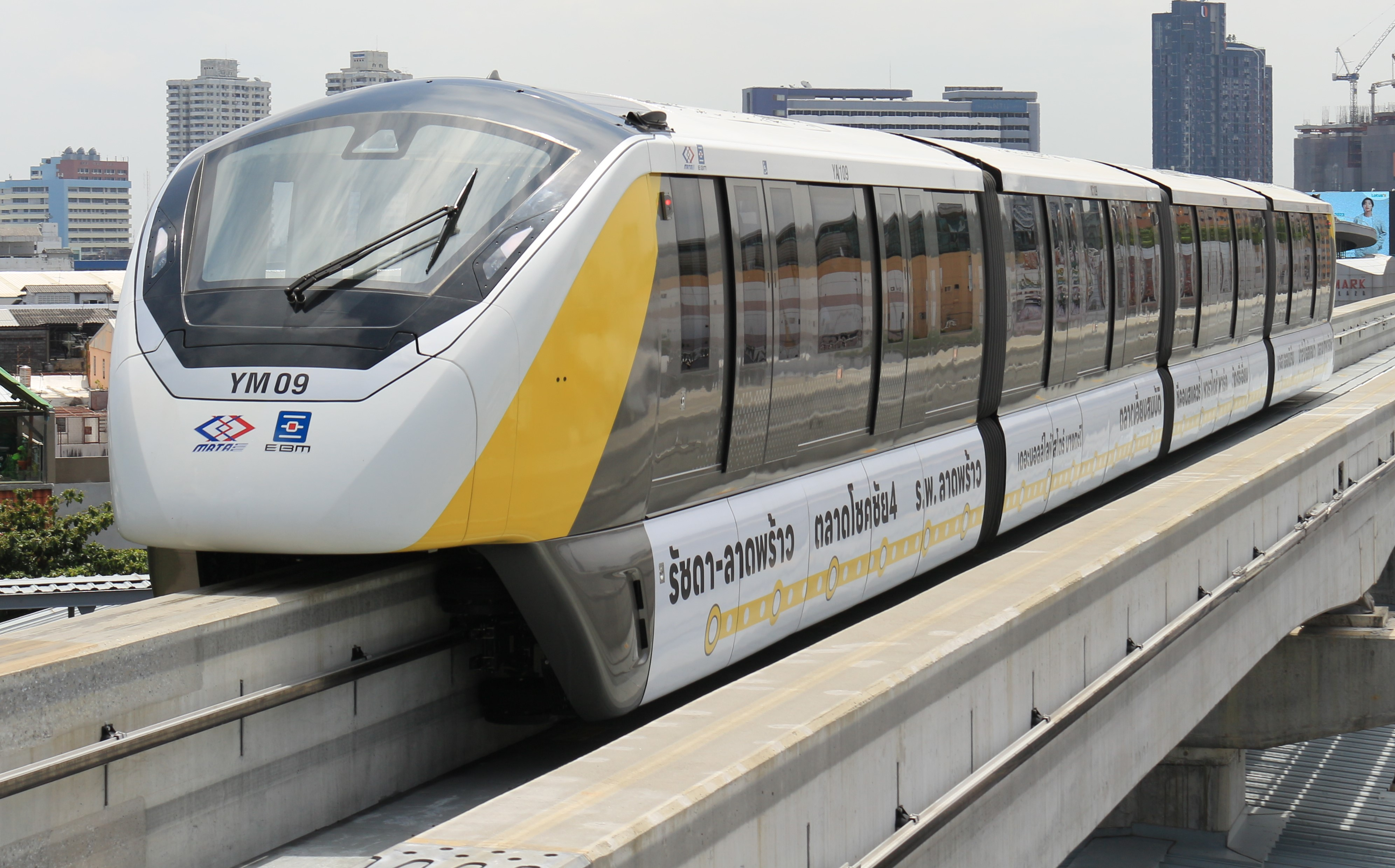
- A Bombardier Innovia Monorail 300 at Bang Kapi station

Overview
- Other name: MRT Nakkara Phiphat Line
- Native name: รถไฟฟ้าสายสีเหลือง รถไฟฟ้าสายนัคราพิพัฒน์
- Status: Operational
- Owner: Mass Rapid Transit Authority of Thailand
- Locale: Bangkok and Samut Prakan, Thailand
- Termini: YL01 Lat Phrao; YL23 Samrong
- Stations: 23
- Website: https://mrta-yellowline.com

Service
- Type: Monorail
- System: Metropolitan Rapid Transit
- Operator(s): Eastern Bangkok Monorail Company Limited (Subsidiary of BSR Consortium)
- Depot: Si Iam Depot
- Rolling stock: Alstom Innovia Monorail 300; 28 four-cars trains
- Daily ridership: 48,035 (30 August 2024)

History
- Work began: 16 June 2017; 9 years ago
- Opened: 3 June 2023; 3 years ago (Trial Run); 3 July 2023; 3 years ago (Full commercial service)

Technical
- Line length: 28.62 kilometers (17.78 mi)
- Character: Fully elevated
- Electrification: 750 V DC
- Operating speed: 80 km/h (50 mph)
- Signalling: Bombardier CITYFLO 650 moving block CBTC ATC under ATO GoA 4 (Fully Automated Train Control), with subsystems of ATP, ATS and CBI

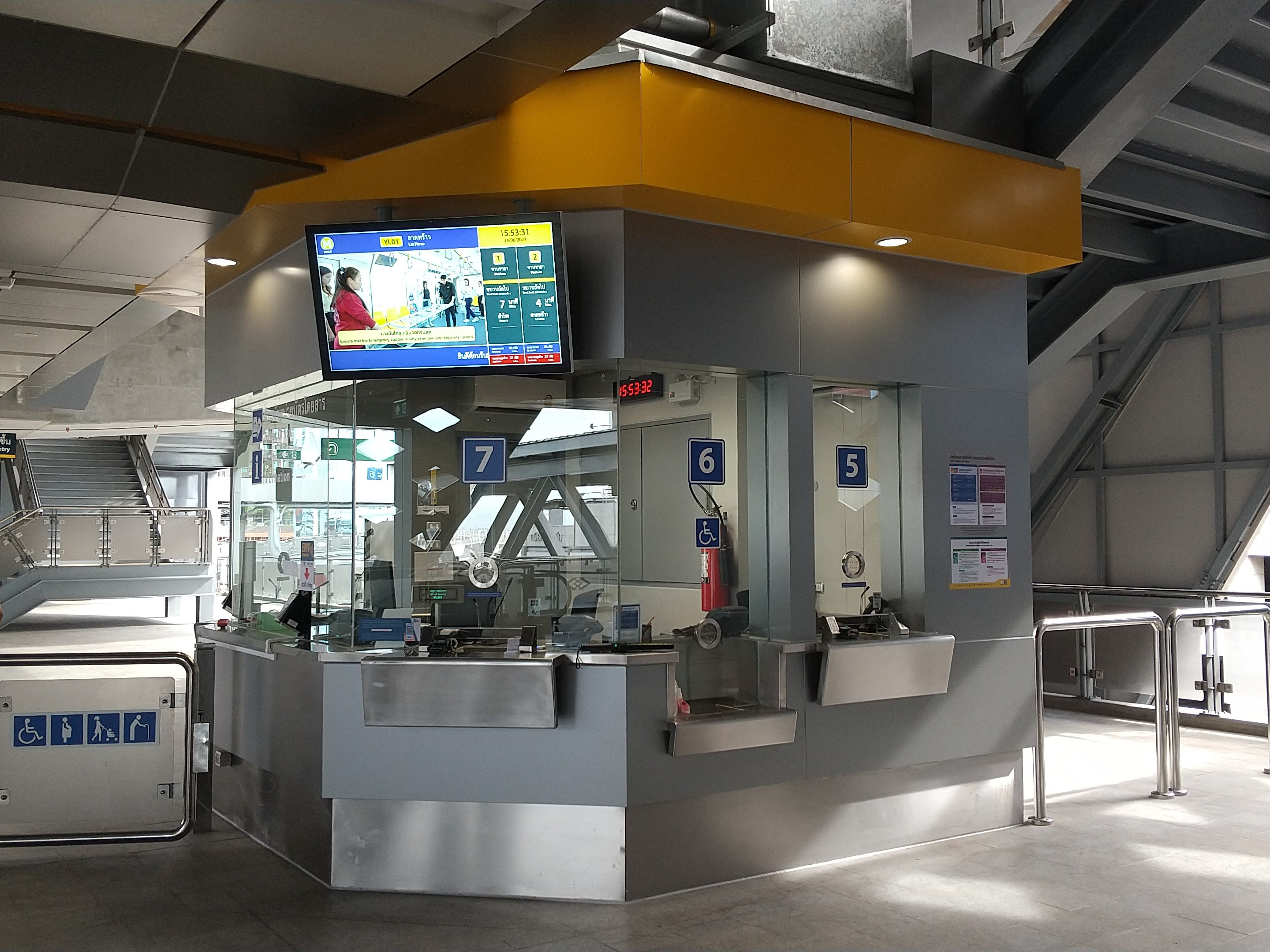
A typical ticket office of the Yellow Line

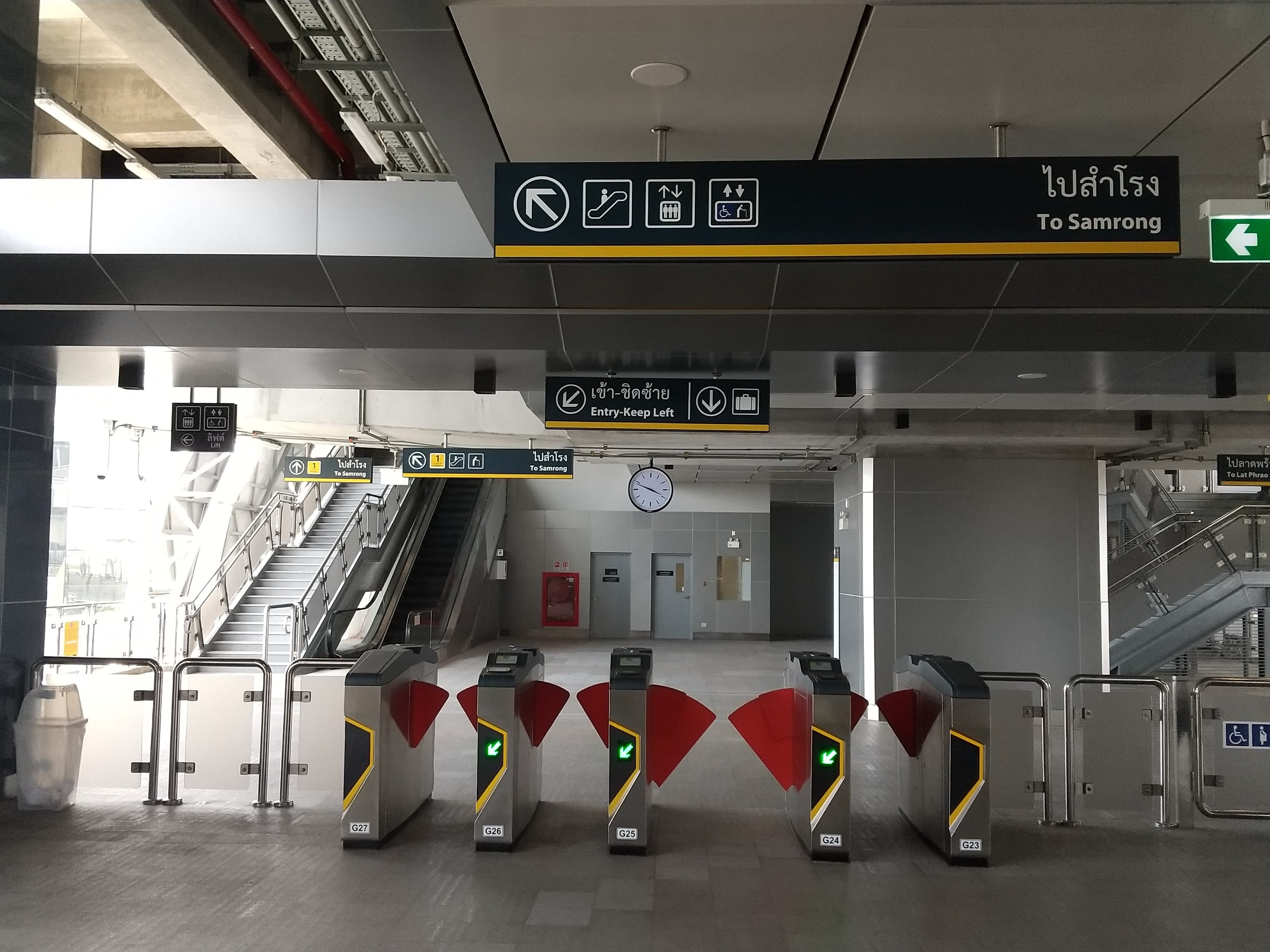
Fare gates in Si Kritha Station

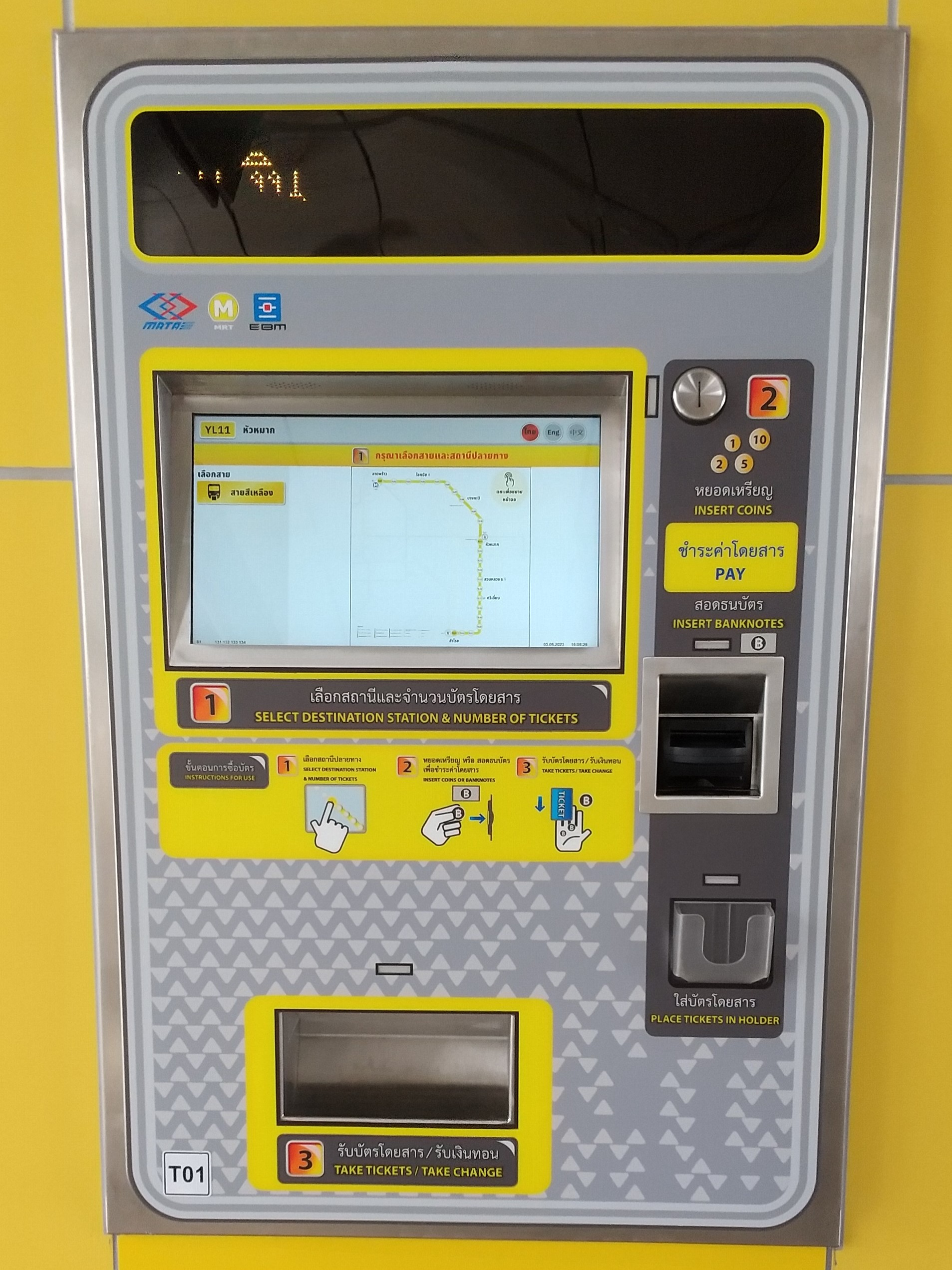
A ticket vending machine in a Yellow Line station

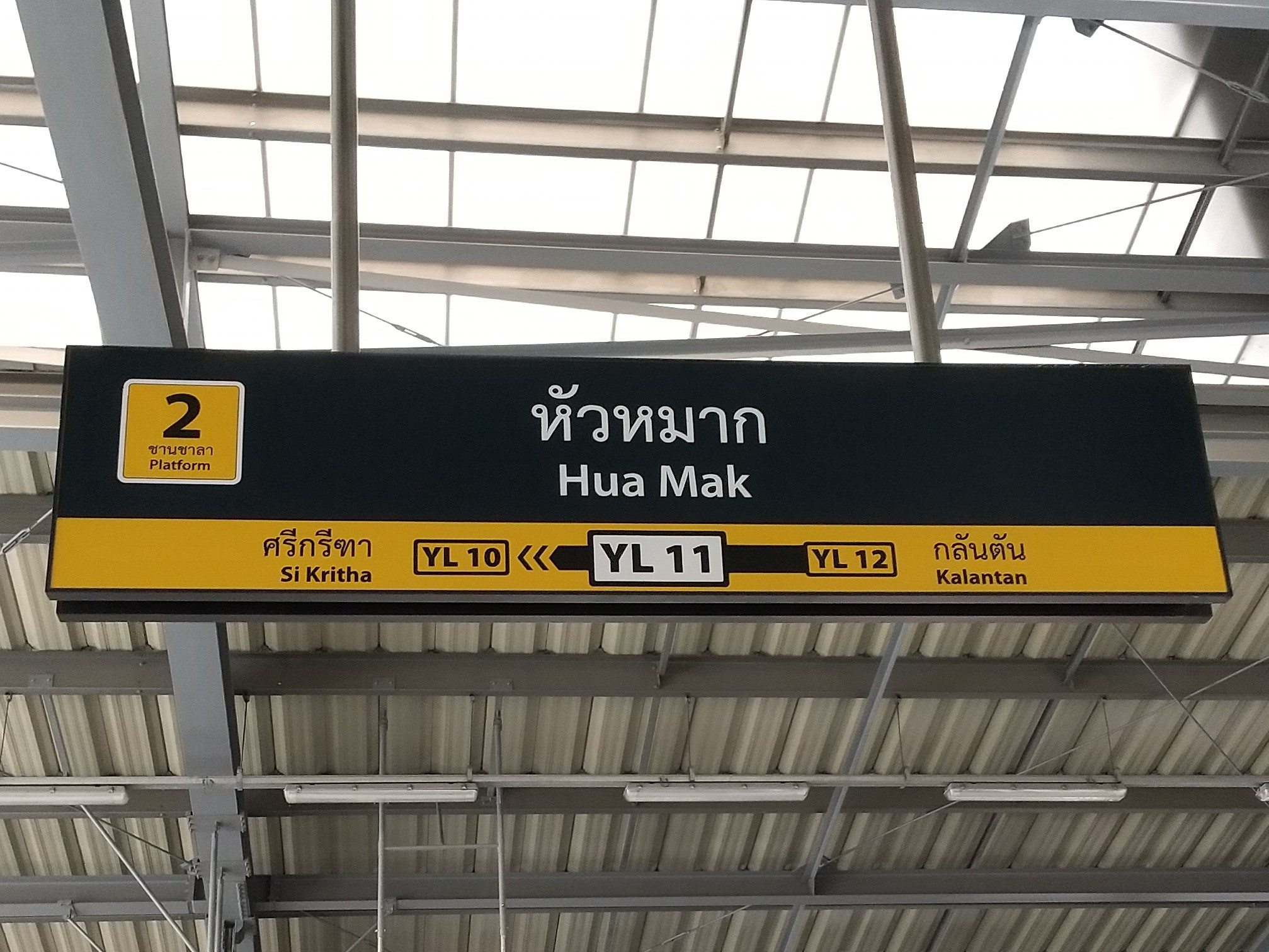
Signage at Hua Mak Station

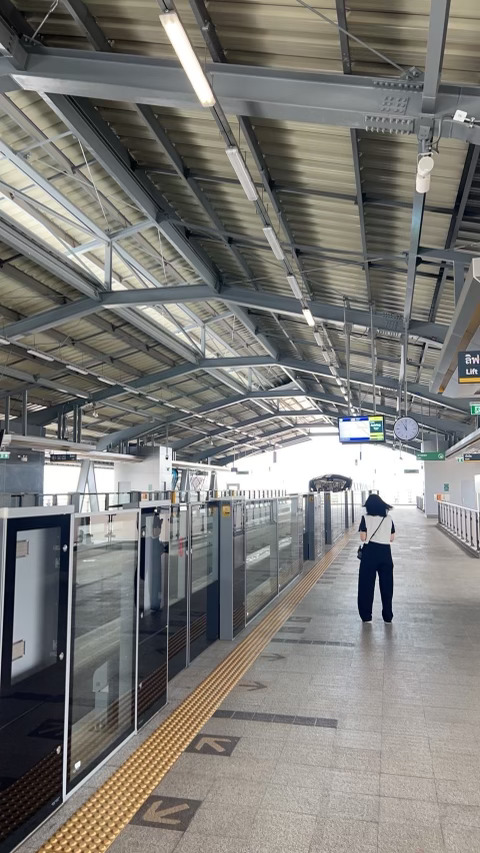
A typical Yellow Line platform level at Si La Salle (YL18)

The MRT Yellow Line (Thai: รถไฟฟ้ามหานคร สายสีเหลือง) or MRT Nakkhara Phiphat Line (Thai: รถไฟฟ้ามหานคร สายนัคราพิพัฒน์) is an elevated monorail line in Bangkok and Samut Prakan Province, Thailand. It is the third line of the MRT rapid transit system. The 28.62 km (17.78 mi) line has 23 stations and cost 55 billion baht. The line was originally proposed in 2005 by the Office of Transport and Traffic Policy and Planning to be a heavy rail underground line along Lat Phrao road which was then elevated from Lam Sali Intersection to Samrong. However, it was decided in 2012 to build an elevated monorail line for the whole length in order to reduce construction costs.

The Yellow Line provides mass transit along the heavily congested Lat Phrao Road and Srinagarindra Road corridors. The line links 6 other lines; the MRT Blue Line, interchange with the MRT Orange Line (which is under construction), the planned MRT Grey Line and MRT Brown Line, the Airport Rail Link (Bangkok) and finally the BTS Sukhumvit Line. As such, it is an important cross city link in the middle north-eastern and eastern areas of Bangkok.

Preliminary site works began in late 2017 with major construction work starting from March 2018. In October 2020, the BSR stated that they plan to open the first section of the Yellow Line by October 2021 with initial operations running from Samrong to Si Iam. The line was then planned to fully open in July 2022. However, due to COVID-19 outbreaks in Bangkok delaying construction with sites closed, the BSR stated that the first section of the line would not open until July 2022. On 29 November 2021, daily testing began on a 6 km (3.7 mi) section of the line between the depot at Si Iam and Srinagarindra 38 station. Testing was expanded after a 3-month period.

In mid-April 2022, the director of EBM/BSR, Mr Surapong Laoha-Unya, stated that further labour and installation delays would mean that the line would now not open until September 2022. Construction had progressed to 99.02% as of the end of April 2023.

After repeated delays, the line partially opened to the public for free trial rides on 3 June 2023 from Hua Mak to Samrong, having done a private trial ride between Kalantan and Samrong for the press the day before. Trial rides for Phawana to Hua Mak section began on 12 June, while the final section between Phawana and Lat Phrao station opened on 19 June.

Rabbit Card are accepted on the MRT Yellow Line, which is also accepted on the BTS Skytrain and MRT Pink Line. This is because the operator is a subsidiary of BTS Group Holdings, which operates the BTS Skytrain. EMV contactless cards are also accepted.

Following two incidents of operational failure in January and March 2024, Vajiralongkorn, the king of Thailand, bestowed an auspicious name upon Bangkok's Yellow Line monorail on 30 May 2024. The line has been officially renamed "Nakkhara Phiphat" (Pali: Nagara Vivaḍḍhana), meaning "prosperity of the city," by royal command.

== Route alignment ==
The line starts at the intersection of Ratchadaphisek and Lat Phrao roads where it interchanges with the MRT Blue Line at Lat Phrao station. The line then heads east along Lat Phrao road to Bang Kapi intersection and south to Lam Sali station to interchange with the MRT Orange Line and the future MRT Brown Line. The line continues further south along Srinagarindra Road to Hua Mak where it interchanges with the Airport Rail Link at Hua Mak station.

From Hua Mak, the route continues south along Srinagarindra Road past the Debaratna (Bang Na-Trat) Road all the way to Thepharak Road in Samut Prakan Province, then heading west along Thepharak Road where it terminates at Samrong and interchanges with Samrong of the BTS Sukhumvit Line.

The line stretches from Lat Phrao (YL1) to Samrong (YL23) and the depot is located at Debaratana Road adjacent to Si Iam station (YL17).

== History ==
The Yellow line was first proposed in the mid-1990s as a monorail line by Japanese consultants with little or no progress for 10 years. In 2004, the Office of Transport and Traffic Policy and Planning (OTP) reworked the proposal as a heavy rail line with underground and elevated sections as part of the 10 line metro plan which was taken to the February 2005 election. In 2009, it was suggested to change the line to an elevated monorail line as a cost saving measure. In December 2011, the MRTA was instructed by the MOT to divide the Yellow Line into two phases for tender and construction purposes and to reduce land appropriation costs. In June 2012, the MRTA contracted consultants to undertake detailed designs of the line. In February 2013, OTP stated that the tender for the Yellow Line should be ready by late 2013 for tender in early 2014. By August 2013, this timeline had changed to a mid 2014 tender date.

However, similar to the MRT Pink Line, delays in finalising the technical requirements of the tender in relation to the selection of monorail rolling stock which determines the type of track to be constructed resulted in further delays. The subsequent political turmoil of late 2013 and early 2014 caused even more delays. Thereafter, a coup in May 2014 resulted in a new military administration and the tender being deferred while a review of all mass transit projects was undertaken for a period of 18 months. The MRTA was instructed by the junta government to change to a PPP tender process which was subsequently not released until mid-2016. In early December 2016, The BSR consortium consisting of BTS Group Holdings (75% majority stake) with Sino-Thai Engineering and Construction (STEC), and Ratchaburi Electricity Generation Holding (RATCH), won the bid to construct and operate the Yellow Line. The BSR also won the bid to build and operate the MRT Pink Line.

On June 16, 2017, the contract was signed for the project between the Mass Rapid Transit Authority of Thailand and BSR consortium. The BSR established the Eastern Bangkok Monorail Company Limited (EBM) to operate the line. A proposed 2 station extension of the route north from the Lat Phrao terminus to link to the BTS Sukhumvit Line at Ratchayothin station has also been proposed by the BSR Joint Venture. However, this extension is opposed by the MRT Blue Line operator BEM due to concerns regarding loss of revenue.

Construction of the Yellow Line began in March 2018.

The public trial run started on 3 June 2023, between Hua Mak and Samrong. The Phawana-Si Kritha section opened on 12 June, while Lat Phrao station opened on 19 June.

As of June 2024, passengers are required to change train due to technical difficulties, sections of station runs in different frequency. Latphrao to Huamak runs every 5 minutes, Huamak to Sri Iam runs every 25 minutes and from Sri Iam to the terminus Samrong every 10 minutes. Yellow maintenance carts can be seen along the line from Huamak to Samrong.

=== Northern extension ===
A proposed 2-station extension of the route north from the current Ratchada terminus to link to the BTS Sukhumvit Line Extension at Ratchayothin station has also been proposed by the BSR Joint Venture. However, this extension is opposed by the MRT Blue Line operator BEM, estimating about 988 million baht loss on the extension's first year of service and 2.7 billion baht throughout the 30-year concession period.

The extension was approved in February 2021, with construction set to be completed in 2024. However, EBM has repeatedly denied MRTA's request to provide compensation for BEM, which may result in a cancellation of the extension if no decision has been made. Regardless, due to lower-than-expected passenger numbers, MRTA decided to put the extension plan on hold, as the Yellow Line needs at least 100,000 passengers per day to ensure the investment feasibility of the project.

Code	Station Name		Transfers
Code	English	Thai	Transfers
↓ Continue from Lat Phrao ↓
YLEX01	Chankasem	จันทรเกษม	
YLEX02	Phahon Yothin 24 / Ratchayothin	พหลโยธิน 24 / รัชโยธิน	Connecting station to either Phahon Yothin 24 or Ratchayothin BTS station for BTS

=== Southern extension ===
A future extension from Samrong station across the Chao Phraya River to link with the MRT Purple Line at Rat Burana was canvassed by the OTP in the early 2010s. However, the current location and design of Samrong station excludes any further extension of the line west of Sukhumvit Road.

== List of stations ==
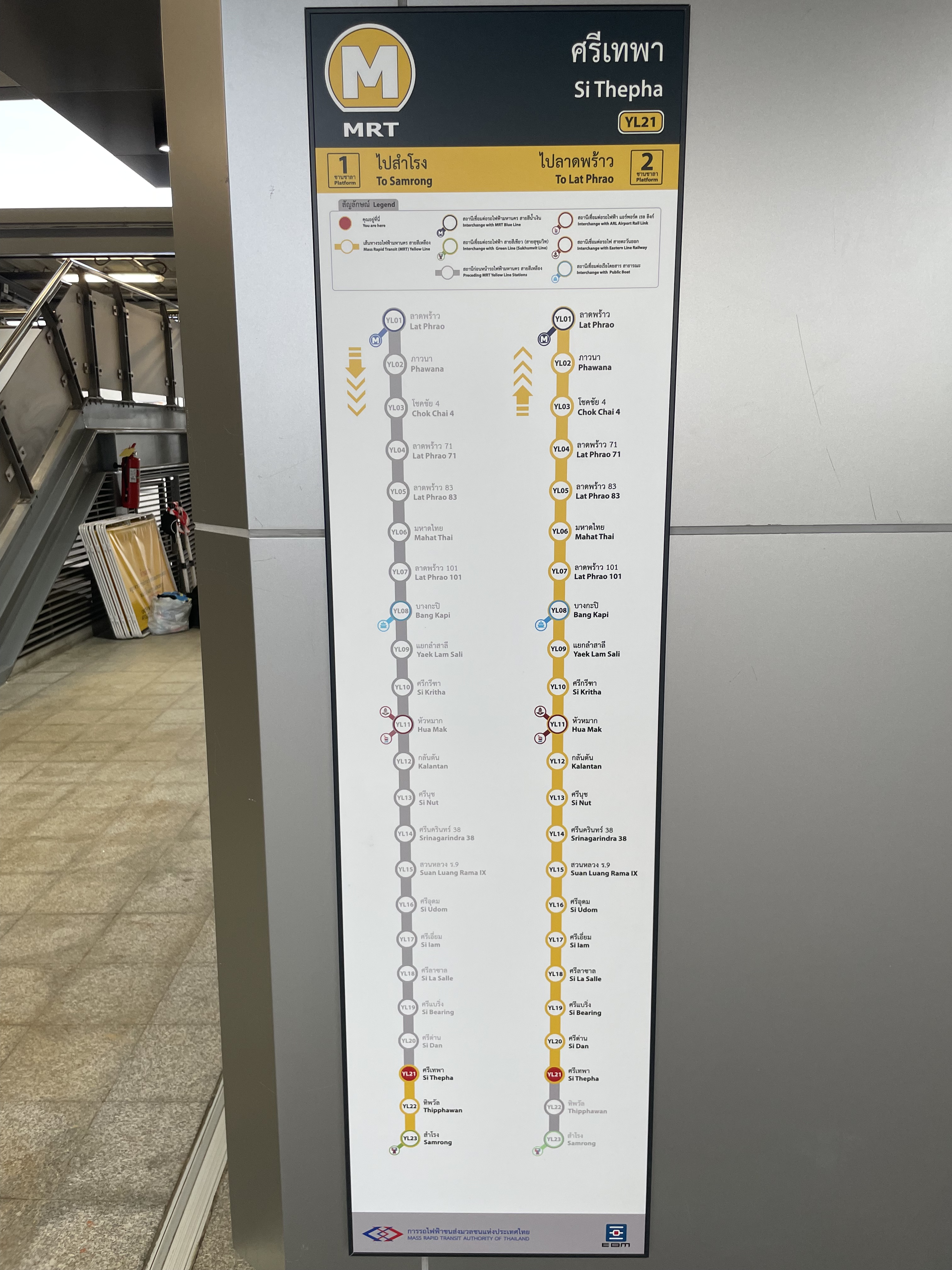
Route diagram shown at Si Thepha station

Code	Station Name		Image	Opened	Platform Type	Park & Ride	Transfers	Notes
Code	English	Thai	Image	Opened	Platform Type	Park & Ride	Transfers	Notes
YL01	Lat Phrao	ลาดพร้าว		19 June 2023; 3 years ago	Side	√	Connecting station to MRT	Exit to: • Ratchada-Lat Phrao Intersection • The Bazaar Hotel Bangkok • Gourmet Market MRT Lat Phrao
YL02	Phawana	ภาวนา		12 June 2023; 3 years ago	Side	-		
YL03	Chok Chai 4	โชคชัย 4		12 June 2023; 3 years ago	Side	-		Exit to: • Chok Chai 4 Market • Council of Engineers • Royal Thai Survey Department Section 1
YL04	Lat Phrao 71	ลาดพร้าว 71		12 June 2023; 3 years ago	Side	-	Proposed connecting station to MRL	
YL05	Lat Phrao 83	ลาดพร้าว 83		12 June 2023; 3 years ago	Side	-		Exit to BigC Supercenter Ladprao 1
YL06	Mahat Thai	มหาดไทย		12 June 2023; 3 years ago	Side	-		Exit to: • Ladprao General Hospital • Foodland Lat Phrao • Green Hospital Ladprao General
YL07	Lat Phrao 101	ลาดพร้าว 101		12 June 2023; 3 years ago	Side	-		
YL08	Bang Kapi	บางกะปิ		12 June 2023; 3 years ago	Side	-	Connecting station to The Mall Bangkapi pier for Khlong Saen Saep boat service	Exit to: • Makro Ladprao • Tawanna Market • The Mall Lifestore Bangkapi • Happyland Center • Lotus's Bangkapi • Bang Kapi Market
YL09	Yaek Lam Sali	แยกลำสาลี		12 June 2023; 3 years ago	Side	-	Connecting station to • MRT (under construction) • MRT (future)	
YL10	Si Kritha	ศรีกรีฑา		12 June 2023; 3 years ago	Side	-		Exit to: • Syn Mun Kong Insurance Headquarter • B.Grimm Technologies Headquarter • Piyaphirom Park
YL11	Hua Mak	หัวหมาก		3 June 2023; 3 years ago	Side	-	Connecting station to • SRT (future) • ARL • SRT Eastern Line	Exit to MaxValu Supermarket
YL12	Kalantan	กลันตัน		3 June 2023; 3 years ago	Side	-		Exit to Thanya Park
YL13	Si Nut	ศรีนุช		3 June 2023; 3 years ago	Side	-		
YL14	Srinagarindra 38	ศรีนครินทร์ 38		3 June 2023; 3 years ago	Side	-		
YL15	Suan Luang Rama IX	สวนหลวง ร.9		3 June 2023; 3 years ago	Side	-		Exit to: • Seacon Square • Train Night Market Srinagarindra • Paradise Park • Suan Luang Rama IX (Magnolia Gate)
YL16	Si Udom	ศรีอุดม		3 June 2023; 3 years ago	Side	-		Exit to Synphaet Srinagarindra Hospital
YL17	Si Iam	ศรีเอี่ยม		3 June 2023; 3 years ago	Side	√	Proposed connecting station to BTS (future)	Exit to: • Wat Sri IamL • Si Iam MRT Depot • AIA East Gateway • Ample Tower
YL18	Si La Salle	ศรีลาซาล		3 June 2023; 3 years ago	Side	-		
YL19	Si Bearing	ศรีแบริ่ง		3 June 2023; 3 years ago	Side	-		
YL20	Si Dan	ศรีด่าน		3 June 2023; 3 years ago	Side	-		Exit to JAS Urban Srinakarin
YL21	Si Thepha	ศรีเทพา		3 June 2023; 3 years ago	Side	-		
YL22	Thipphawan	ทิพวัล		3 June 2023; 3 years ago	Side	-		
YL23	Samrong	สำโรง		3 June 2023; 3 years ago	Side	-	Interchange station with BTS via transfer gates.	Exit to: • Imperial World Samrong • Big C Supercenter Samrong 1 • Iamcharoen Market • Samrong Fresh Market • Samrong Medical Hospital

== Rolling stock ==
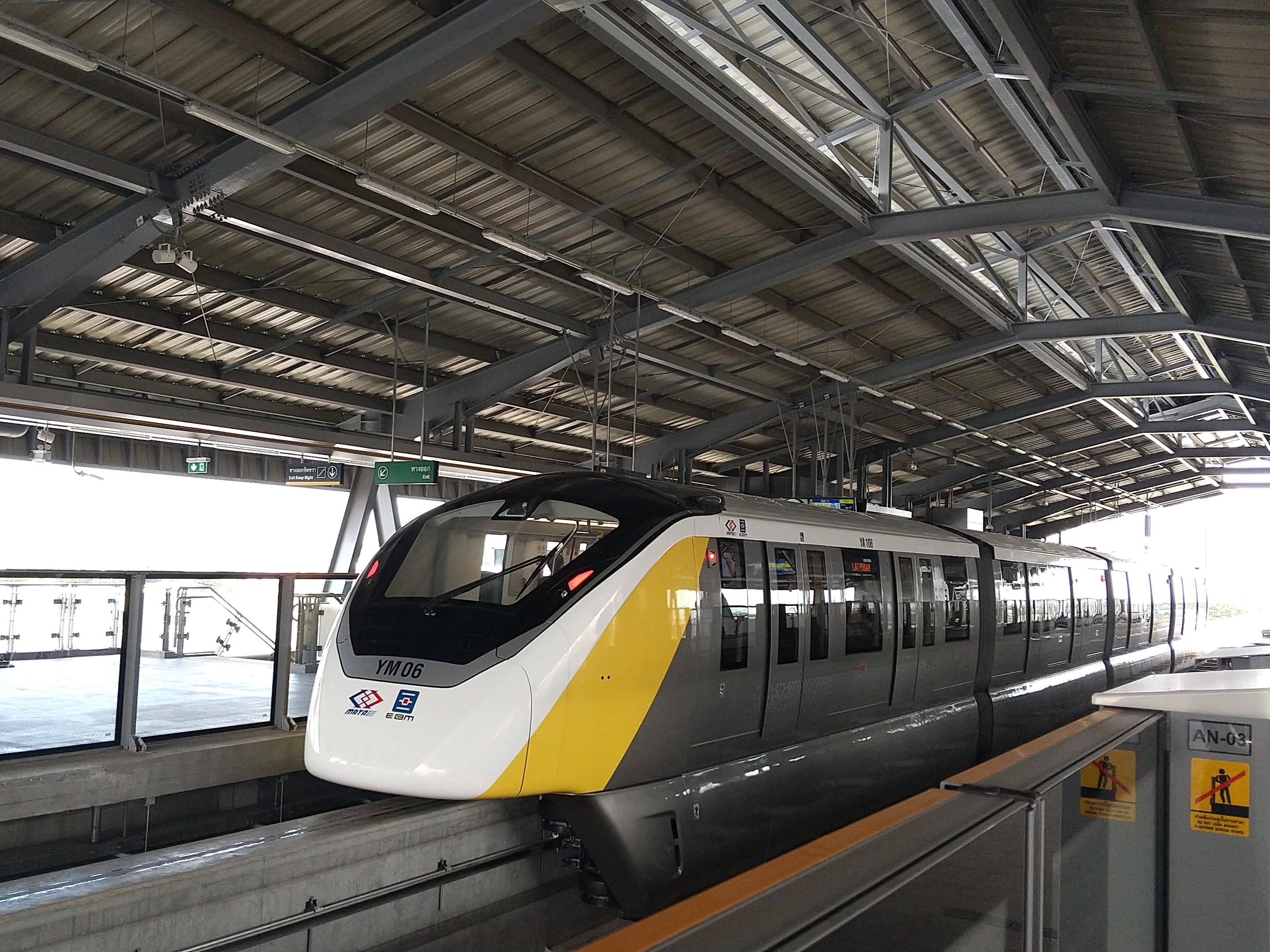
Innovia Monorail 300 rolling stock used on the Yellow line, at Si Kritha station

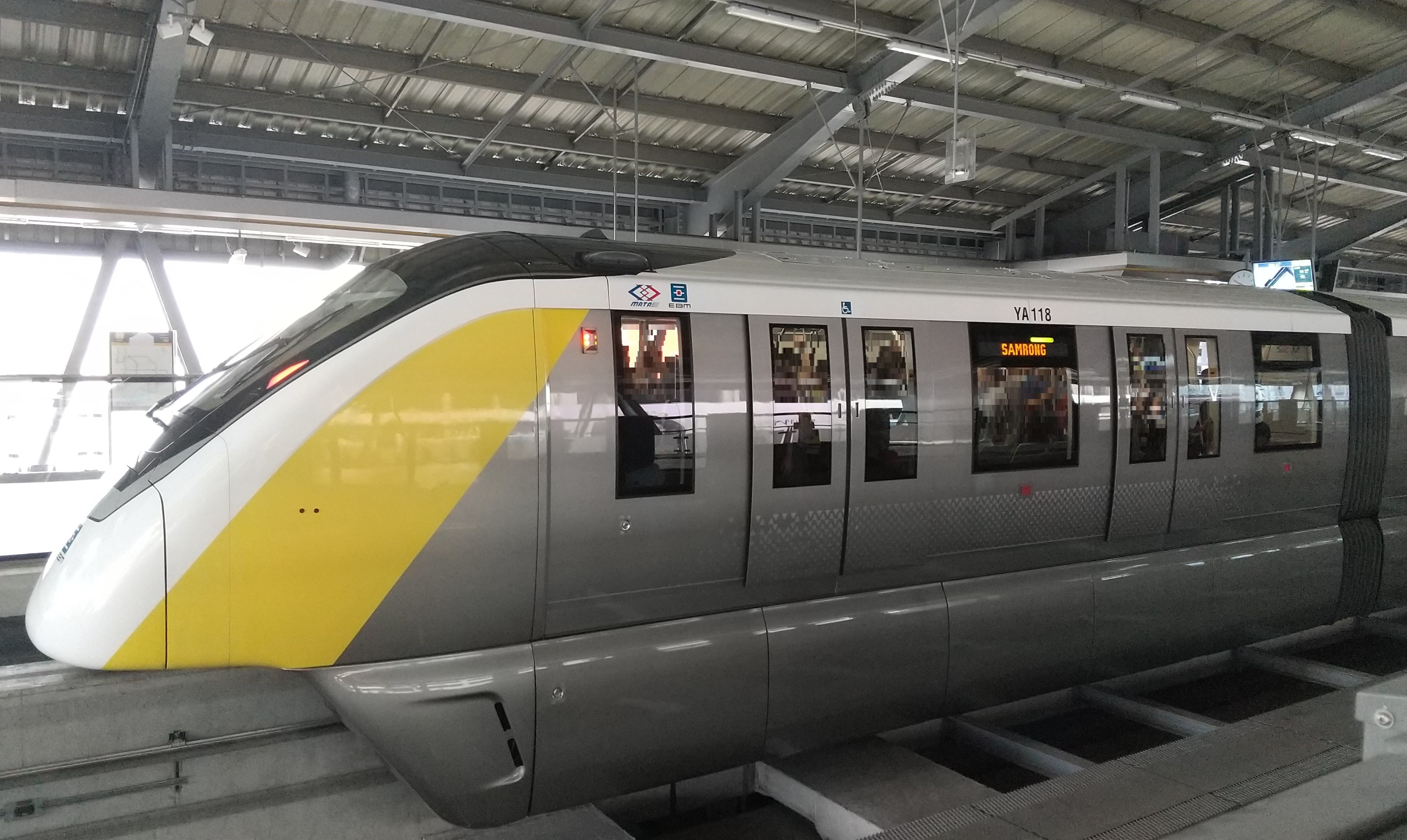
Innovia Monorail 300 trains at Lat Phrao Station

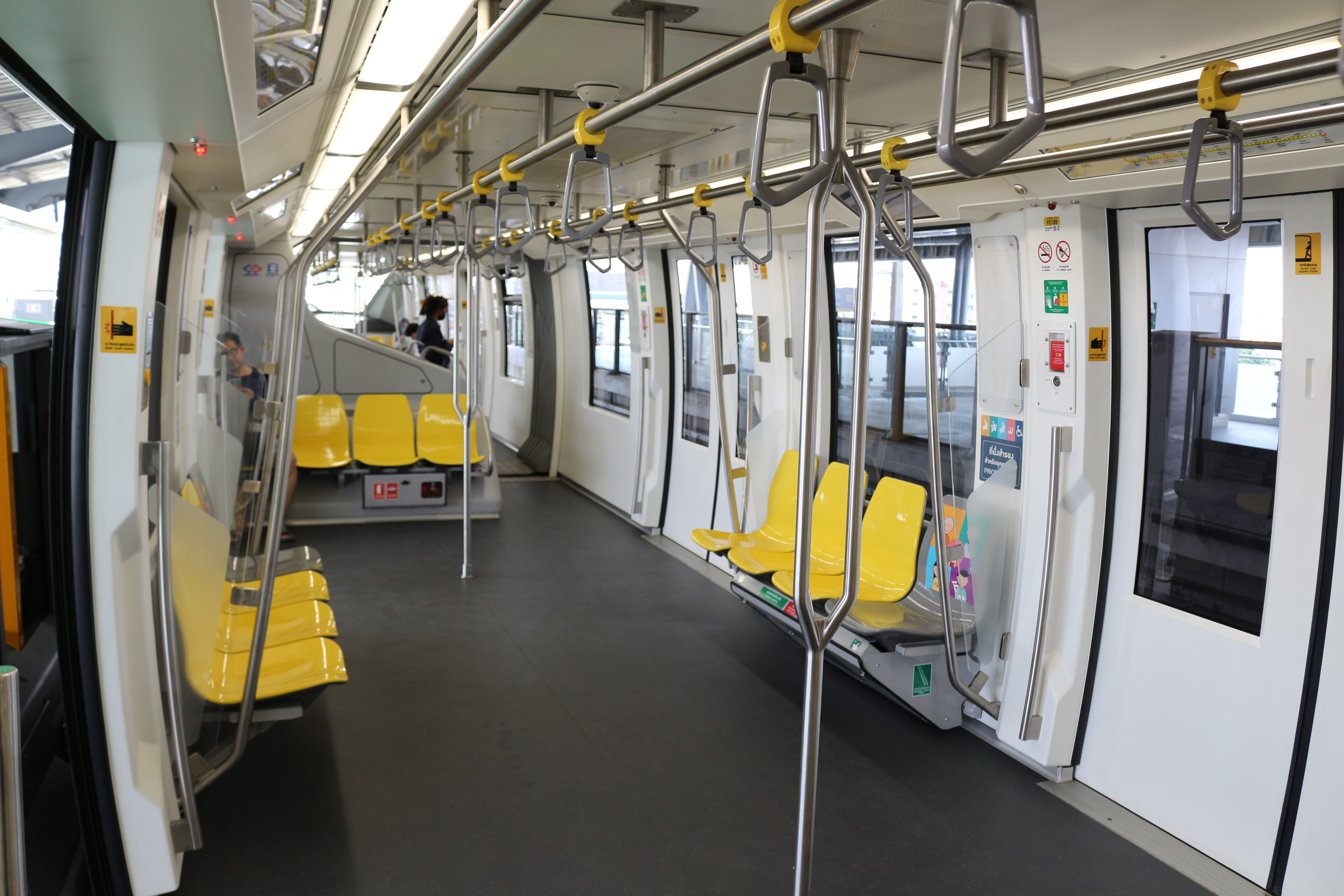
Interior of the Yellow Line train

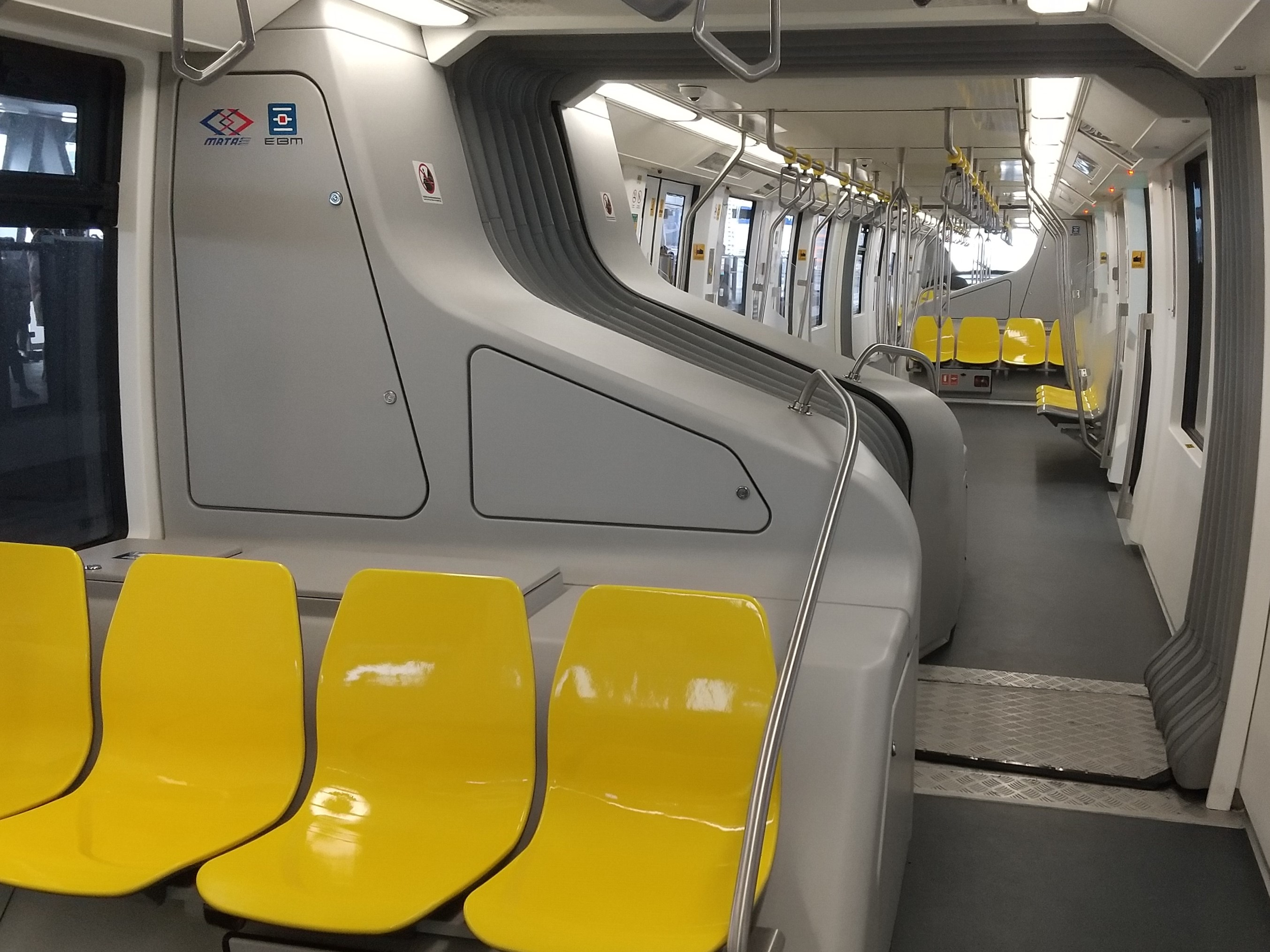
Interior of the Yellow Line train

Yellow Line train departing Thipphawan station towards Samrong station

BSR selected Bombardier Innovia Monorail 300 rolling stock for the Yellow line. The BSR announced that they would purchase 28 4-car sets to operate the Yellow line. The trains were manufactured by CRRC Puzhen Bombardier Transportation Systems (joint venture of Bombardier Transportation and CRRC Nanjing Puzhen) in Wuhu, Anhui, China. The first set was assembled and shipped on 4 September 2020 with delivery to Thailand at the end of September 2020. The first set arrived in Thailand on 1 October 2020 at Laem Chabang port with a handover ceremony attended by the then Prime Minister Prayut Chan-o-cha, BTSC Chairman, MRTA and Canadian Ambassador. Two more sets arrived in mid December 2020 for a total of 5 sets by the end of 2020. By July 2021, 8 sets had been delivered and were being tested. As of the end of October 2021, 12 sets had been delivered. By the end of November 2021, the BSR stated that 20 sets had been delivered with the remaining sets expected to be fully delivered by the end of March 2022. However, as of mid April 2022 only 26 sets had been received and were progressing undergoing testing. The remaining sets were expected to be delivered by July 2022.

Technical Characteristics

- Low profile vehicles/low floor height above beam
- Distinct sloped nose/end-cap
- Inter-car walkthrough
- Rubber-tires and permanent magnet motor
- Aluminium body, steel underframe, composite end cap
- 4-car sets have a capacity of 24,100 pax p/h each way and 8-car sets a capacity of 49.600 pax p/h each way with a 75-second headway.
- Innovia Monorails are all fully automated and are equipped with CITYFLO 650 GOA 4 (Fully Automated Train Control)communications-based train control for driverless operation to increase reliability, shorten head ways between trains and lower maintenance costs.

The BSR stated that the passenger capacity for 4-car sets will be 17,000 passengers per hour each way.

=== Guideway beams ===
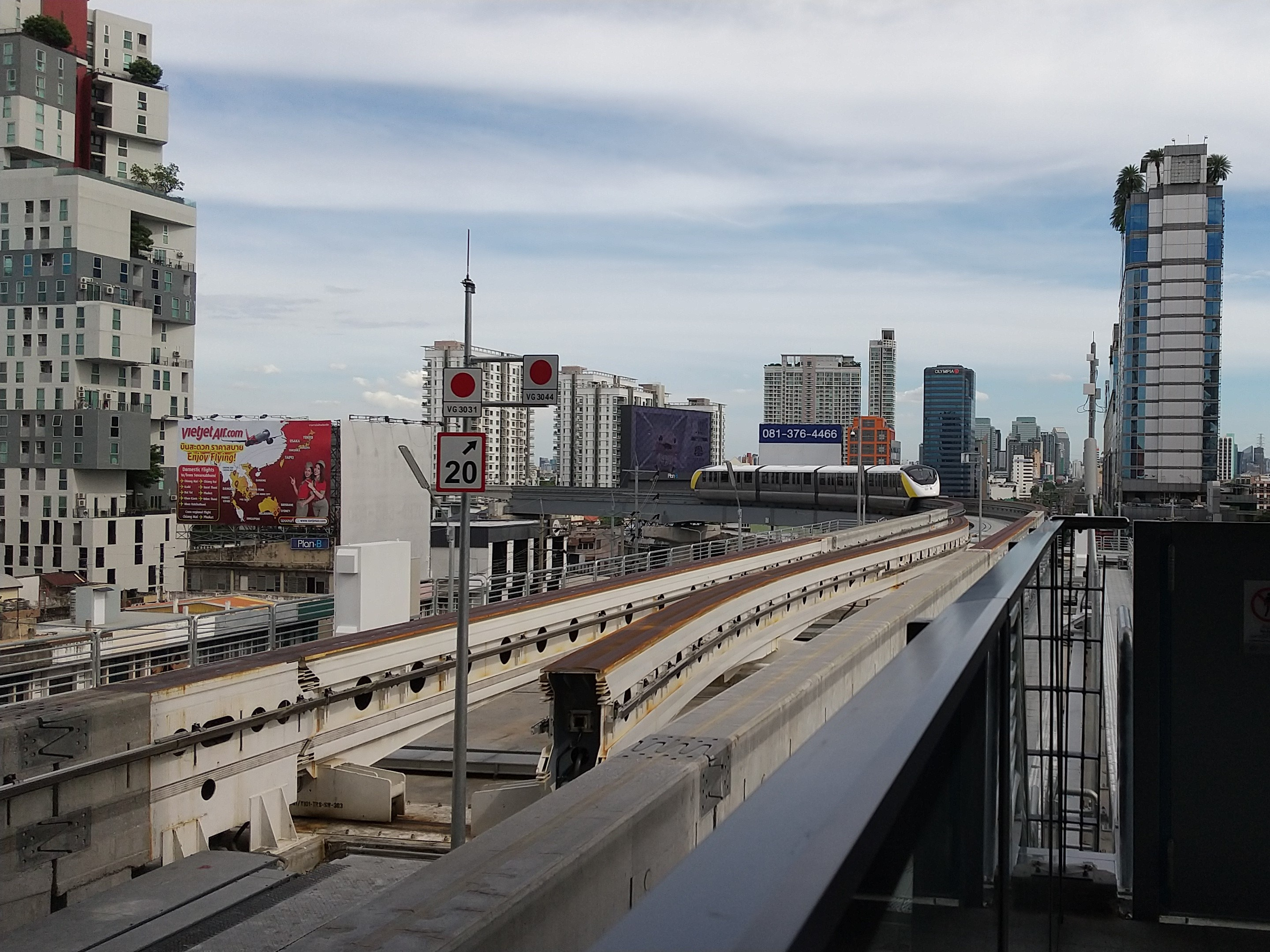
Elevated guideway beams at Lat Phrao Station

The Bombardier Innovia Monorail 300 operates on a narrow, elevated guideway beam. Pre-cast, post-tensioned guideway beams are constructed at an off-site location and later installed on the system. The guideway beams are 690 mm (27 in) wide. The Innovia Monorail 300 was designed to navigate curves as tight as 46 m (151 ft) and a maximum grade of 6%. Monorail switches are either beam replacement or multi-position pivot switches. The system has evacuation walkways down the entire length of the guideway beam. These walkways allow passengers to escape any onboard hazard. The maintenance crew also uses these walkways for repairs and general maintenance to the system.

== Operation ==
=== Headways ===
MRT Yellow Line headway
Time	Headway (Minutes:Seconds)
Monday - Friday
06.00 - 07.00	10:00
07:00 - 09:00	05:00
09:00 - 17:00	10:00
17:00 - 20:00	05:00
20:00 - 24:00	10:00
Saturday to Sunday and Public Holiday
06:00 - 24:00	10:00

=== Ridership ===
From January 25 to January 31, 2025, Prime Minister Paetongtarn Shinawatra has implemented a policy of free public transportation in Bangkok for one week. This measure aims to address the worsening air pollution caused by surging dust levels across all districts of the capital.

MRT Yellow Line Ridership
Year	Quarter	Quarterly Ridership	Daily Ridership	Annual Ridership	Remarks
2023	Q1			7,474,368	
2023	Q2			7,474,368	
2023	Q3	3,660,530	40,673	7,474,368	YL01 Lat Phrao - YL23 Samrong section officially opened on 3 July 2023.
2023	Q4	3,813,838	41,454	7,474,368	
2024	Q1	3,588,377	39,433	14,260,485	
2024	Q2	2,939,242	32,300	14,260,485	Equipment failures on March 28, 2024, caused six stations to temporarily close for two days.
2024	Q3	3,770,408	40,983	14,260,485	
2024	Q4	3,962,458	43,071	14,260,485	
2025	Q1	4,086,815	45,410	16,516,043	Free public transportation policy was implemented between 25 and 31 January 2025. Train services were temporarily suspended due to 2025 Myanmar Earthquake on 28 March 2025. The line resumed normal service on 30 March 2025.
2025	Q2	3,813,345	41,905	16,516,043	
2025	Q3	4,236,245	46,047	16,516,043	
2025	Q4	4,379,638	47,605	16,516,043	As of December 2025.
2026	Q1	4,166,822	46,298	12,705,833	
2026	Q2	3,942,813	43,328	12,705,833	
2026	Q3	4,596,198	49,959	12,705,833	As of September 2026
2026	Q4			12,705,833	

== Incidents ==
=== January 2024 equipment failure ===
On 2 January 2024, a guide wheel from one of the trains fell off between Si Thepha Station and Si Dan Station and hit a taxi on Thepharak Road. There were no injuries. Investigations found the cause to be a broken ball bearing socket holding the wheels. The event followed a similar incident a week earlier on the Pink Line, where a 300-meter section of the on conductor rail fell onto the road near Samakkhi station. The following day, trains operated at 55-minute intervals with many complaints from commuters returning to work on the first day after the new year holidays. EBM is expected to be fined heavily for the damage. Service was restored on 4 January with trains running at 15-minute intervals free of charge.

=== March 2024 equipment failures ===
On 28 March 2024 loose bolts caused parts to fall from the conductor rail to the street below between Kalantan and Si Udom stations causing service to be suspended and damaging vehicles. The following day limited service was resumed but a power outage at Hua Mak caused a further partial suspension of service. Six stations were still closed two days after the incident. Repairs to the affected section could take 2–3 months.

=== 2025 Myanmar earthquake ===
On March 28, a 7.7-magnitude earthquake in Myanmar struck Bangkok, leading to the temporary suspension of all train services to ensure readiness for resumption and to prepare for potential aftershocks. The line resumed normal service on March 30, 2025, at 12:00.

== Route map ==

Route of the Yellow Line

== Network map ==
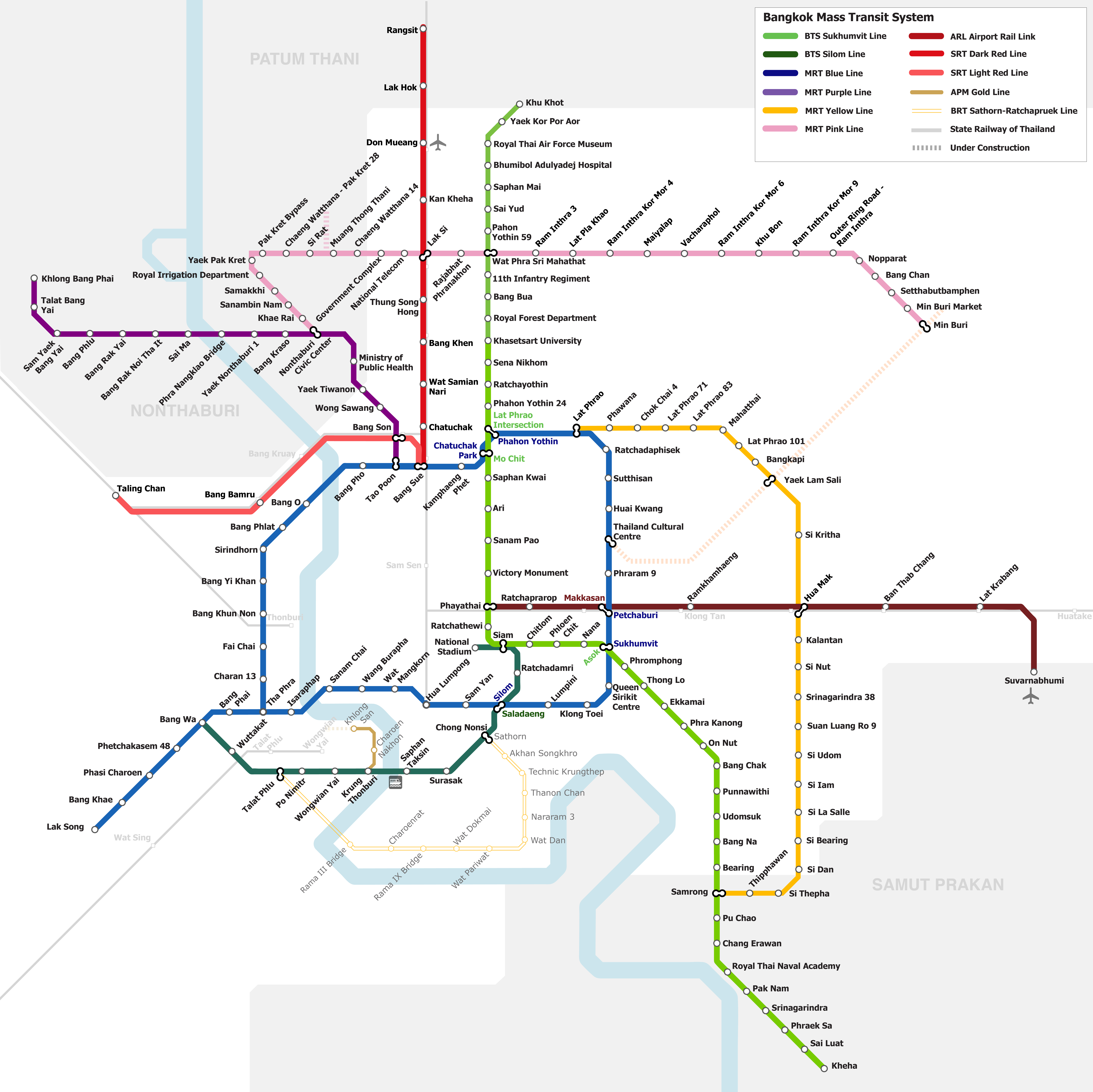

== See also ==
- Mass Rapid Transit Master Plan in Bangkok Metropolitan Region
- MRT (Bangkok)
- MRT Blue Line
- MRT Brown Line
- MRT Grey Line
- MRT Light Blue Line
- MRT Orange Line
- MRT Purple Line
- MRT Pink Line
- BTS Skytrain
- BTS Sukhumvit Line
- BTS Silom Line
- Airport Rail Link (Bangkok)
- SRT Light Red Line
- SRT Dark Red Line
- Bangkok BRT
- BMA Gold Line
