= Thipphawan MRT station =

Monorail station in Bangkok, Thailand

Thipphawan ทิพวัล
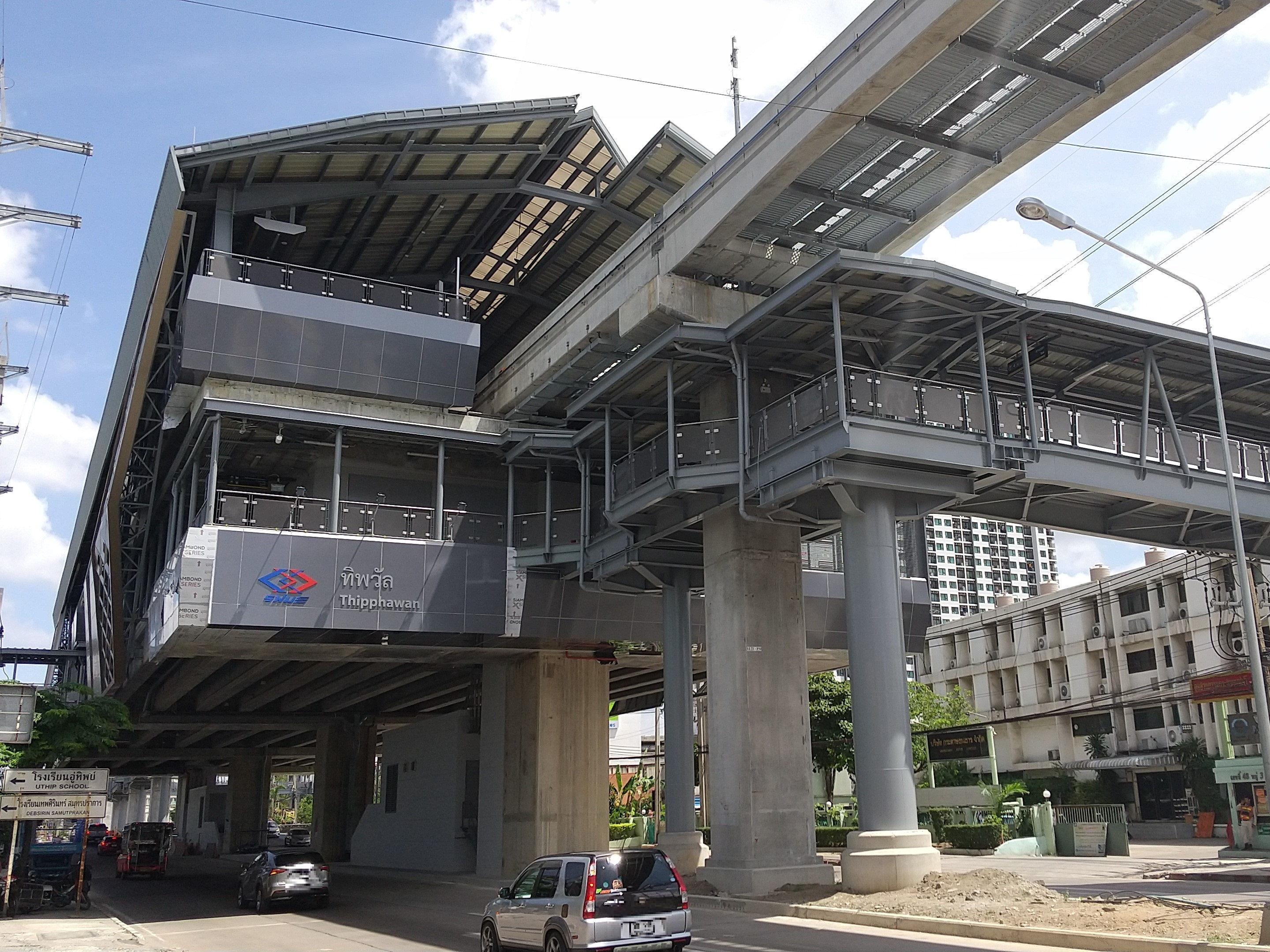

General information
- Location: Mueang Samut Prakan, Samut Prakan, Thailand
- Coordinates: 13.6368°N 100.6099°E
- System: MRT
- Owner: Mass Rapid Transit Authority of Thailand (MRTA)
- Operator: Eastern Bangkok Monorail Company Limited (EBM)
- Line: Yellow Line

Other information
- Station code: YL22

History
- Opened: 3 June 2023; 3 years ago

Services
Preceding station	Metropolitan Rapid Transit	Following station
Si Thepha towards Lat Phrao	Yellow Line	Samrong Terminus
Location

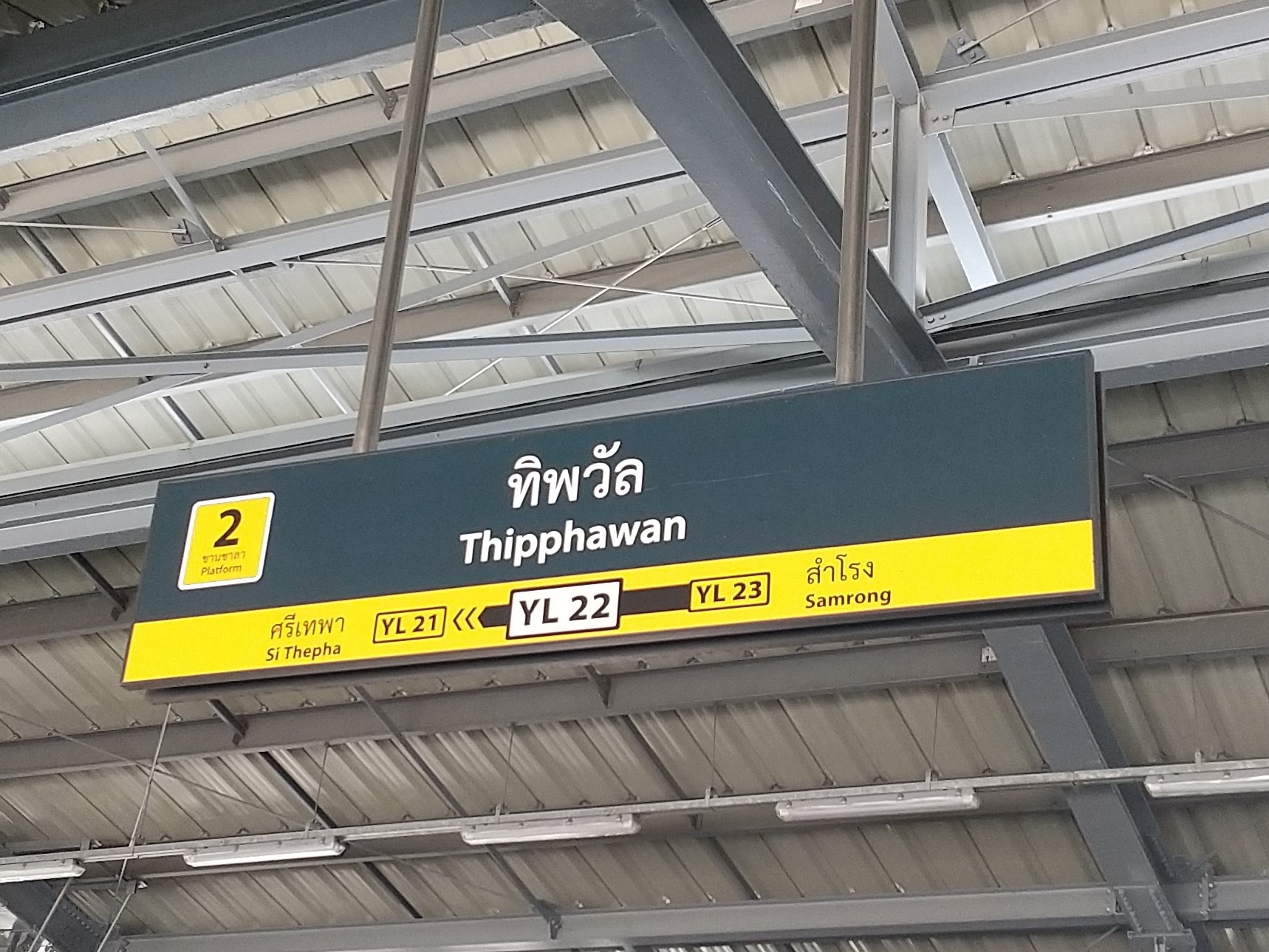
Signage

Thipphawan station (Thai: สถานีทิพวัล, pronounced [sā.tʰǎː.nīː tʰíp.pʰā.wān]) is a Bangkok MRT station on the Yellow Line. The station is located on Thepharak road in Samut Prakan Province and is named after the Thipphawan Housing Community located adjacent to the station. The station has four entrances. It opened on 3 June 2023 as part of trial operations on the line between Samrong and Hua Mak.

== Station layout ==
U3	Side platform, doors will open on the left
U3	Platform 1	Yellow towards Samrong (Samrong)
U3	Platform 2	Yellow towards Lat Phrao (Si Thepha)
U3	Side platform, doors will open on the left
U2	Concourse	Exit 1-4, Ticket machines
G	-	Bus stop
