= Samrong station =

Railway station in Samut Prakan, Thailand

Samrong สำโรง
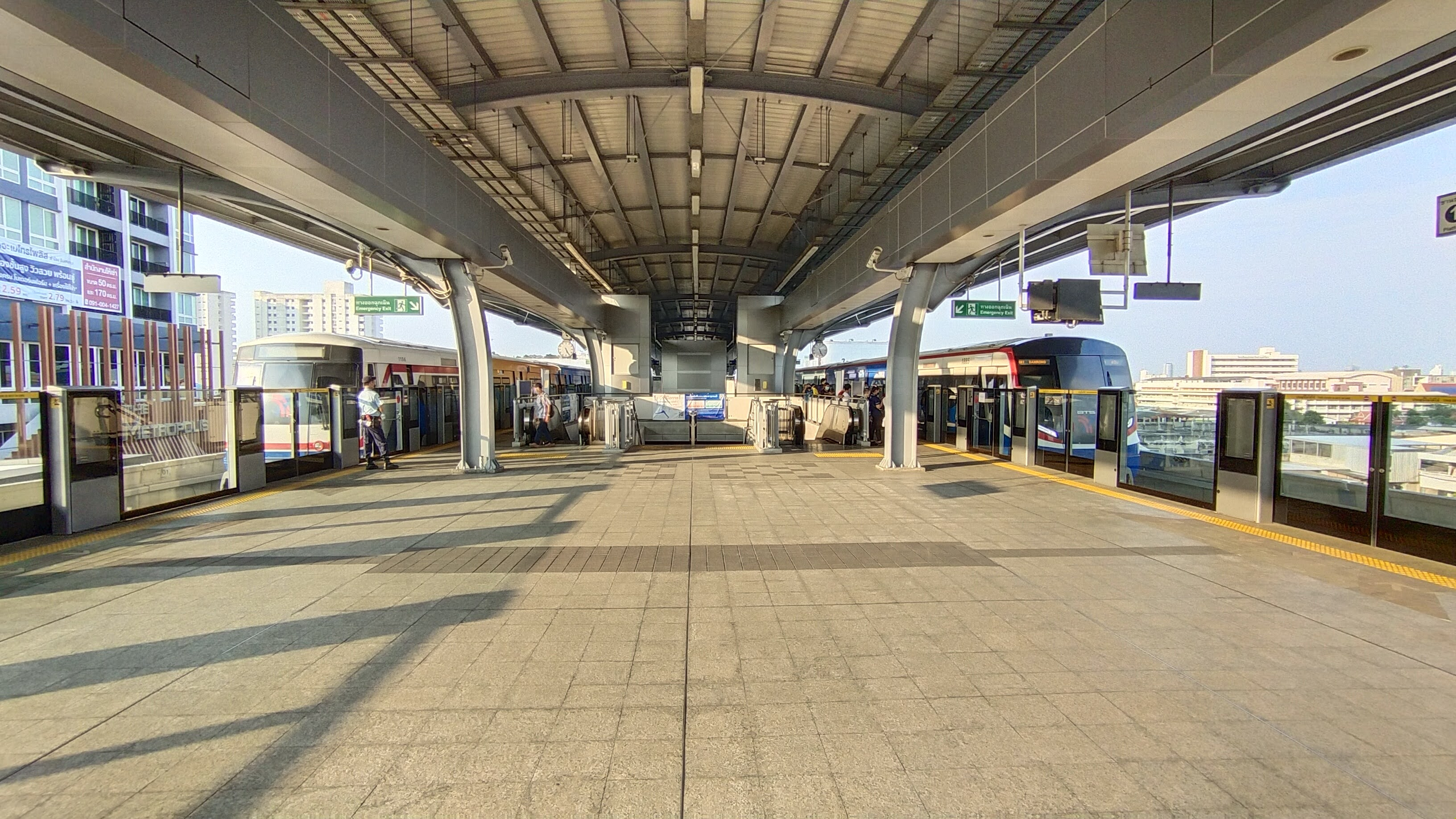
- BTS station platforms

General information
- Location: Mueang Samut Prakan, Samut Prakan, Thailand
- Coordinates: 13.647363°N 100.596153°E
- System: BTS MRT
- Owner: Bangkok Metropolitan Administration (BMA)
- Operator: Bangkok Mass Transit System; Public Company Limited (BTSC) (BTS SkyTrain); Eastern Bangkok Monorail Company Limited (EBM) (Yellow Line)
- Lines: Sukhumvit Line; Yellow Line

Other information
- Station code: E15 (Sukhumvit line); YL23 (Yellow line)

History
- Opened: 3 March 2017; 9 years ago (BTS); 3 June 2023; 3 years ago (MRT)

Passengers
- 2021: 3,186,681 (BTS)

Services
Preceding station	BTS Skytrain	Following station
Bearing towards Khu Khot	Sukhumvit Line	Pu Chao towards Kheha
Preceding station	Metropolitan Rapid Transit	Following station
Thipphawan towards Lat Phrao	Yellow Line	Terminus
Location

Samrong Station Traditional sign

Samrong (Thai: สถานีสำโรง, pronounced [sā.tʰǎː.nīː sǎm.rōːŋ]) is the name of two connecting rapid transit stations, on the Sukhumvit Line of the BTS Skytrain and the MRT Yellow Line, in Samut Prakan, Thailand.

Trial operations on the BTS began in March 2017, and the station was officially opened by Prime Minister Prayut Chan-o-cha on 3 April 2017, with passengers able to ride the extension for free for a month beginning on 4 April 2017. It was the eastern terminus of the line, until the opening of the other stations of the Sukhumvit Line Extension (East) on 6 December 2018. It is one of only four BTS stations to have island platforms, with the other being Siam, Ha Yaek Lat Phrao and Wat Phra Sri Mahathat station. Some trains terminate here during peak hours.

Trial operations on the Yellow Line opened on 3 June 2023 between Samrong and Hua Mak stations with full operations to Lat Phrao from 19 June 2023.

== Station layout ==
=== Yellow Line ===
U3	Side platform, doors will open on the left
U3	Platform 1	Unused platform (terminus)
U3	Platform 2	Yellow towards Lat Phrao (Thipphawan)
U3	Side platform, doors will open on the left
U2	Concourse	Exit 1-4, Ticket machines
G	-	Bus stop

== Gallery ==
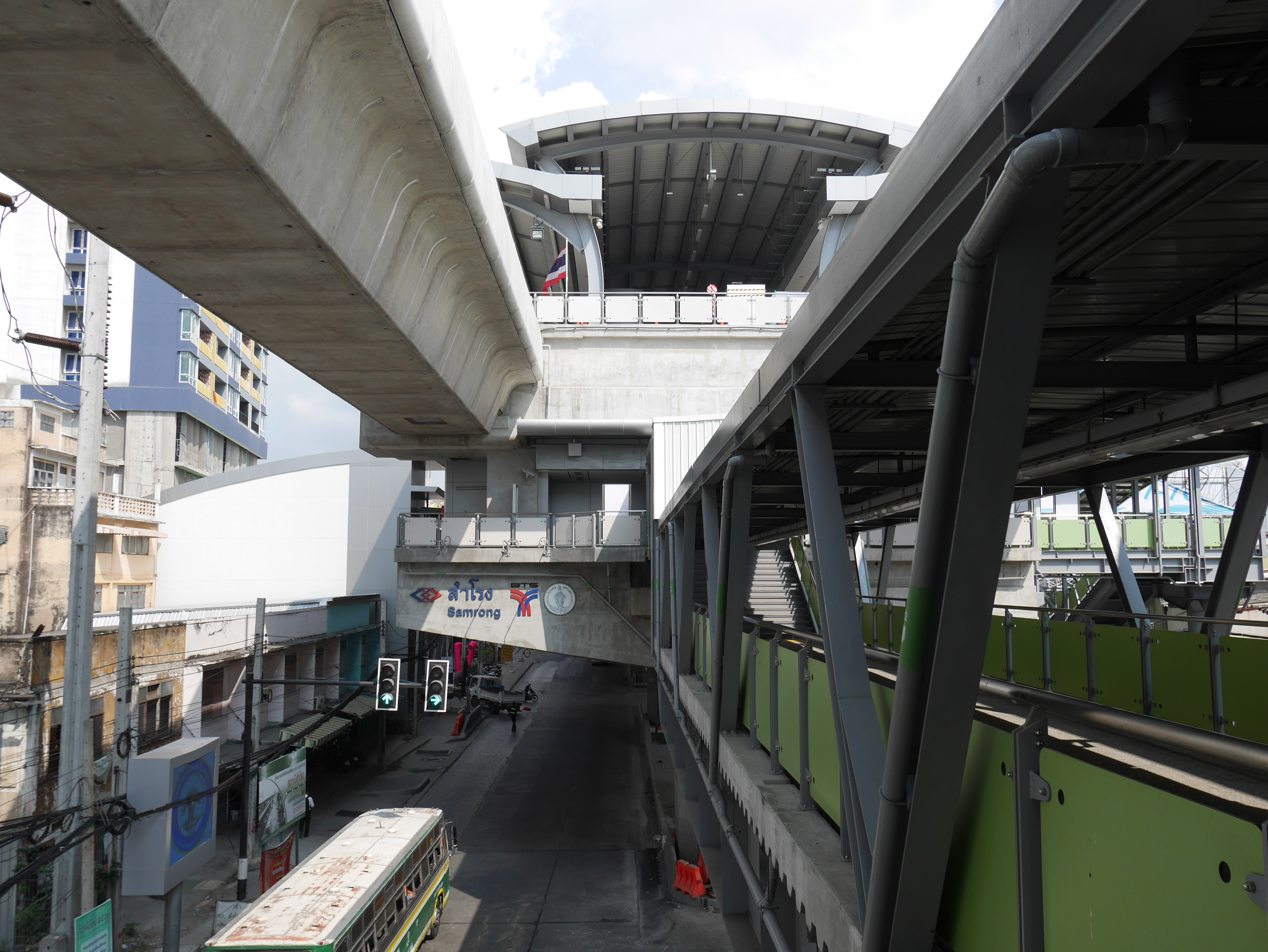
BTS station exterior view

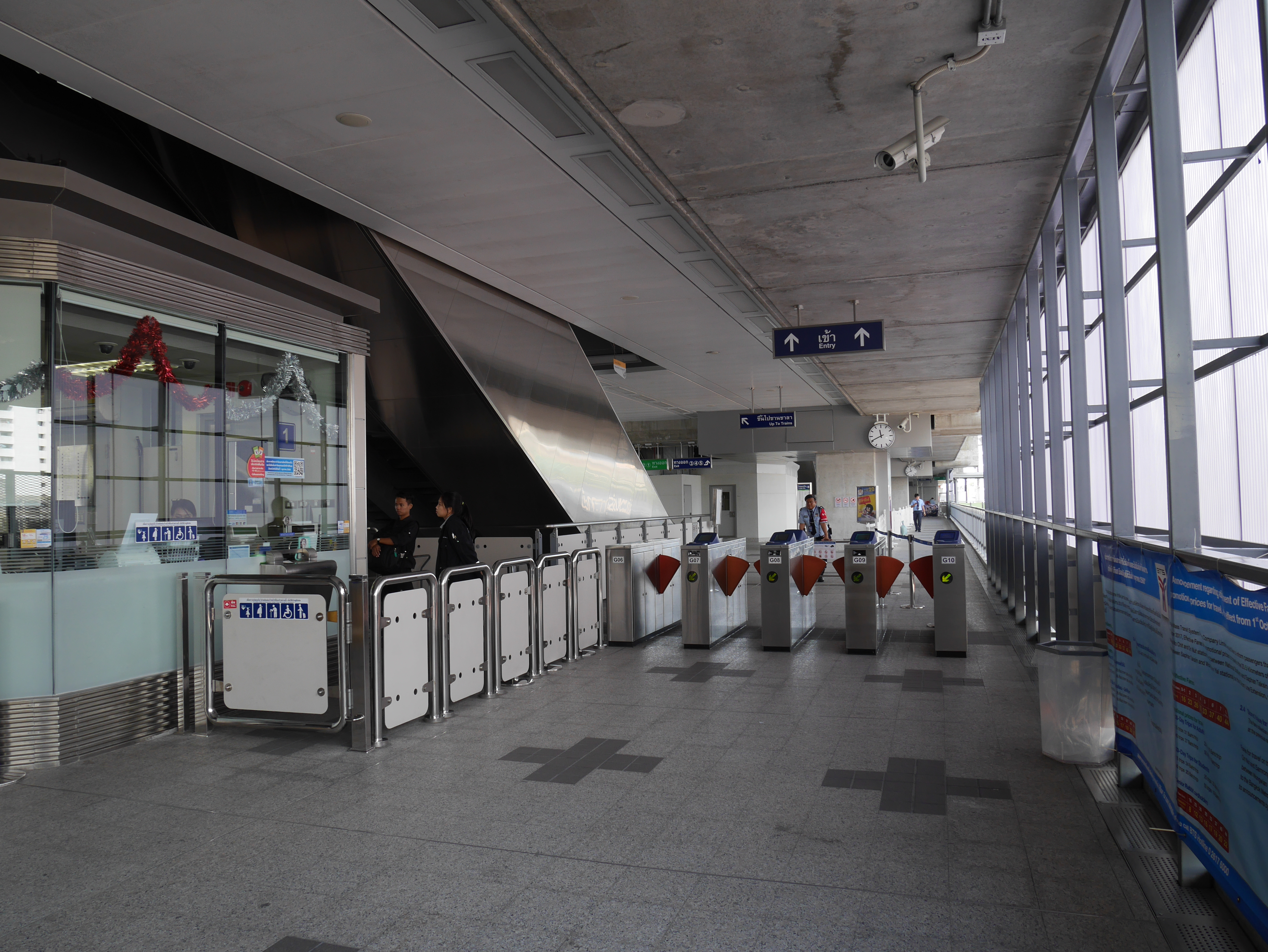
BTS station concourse

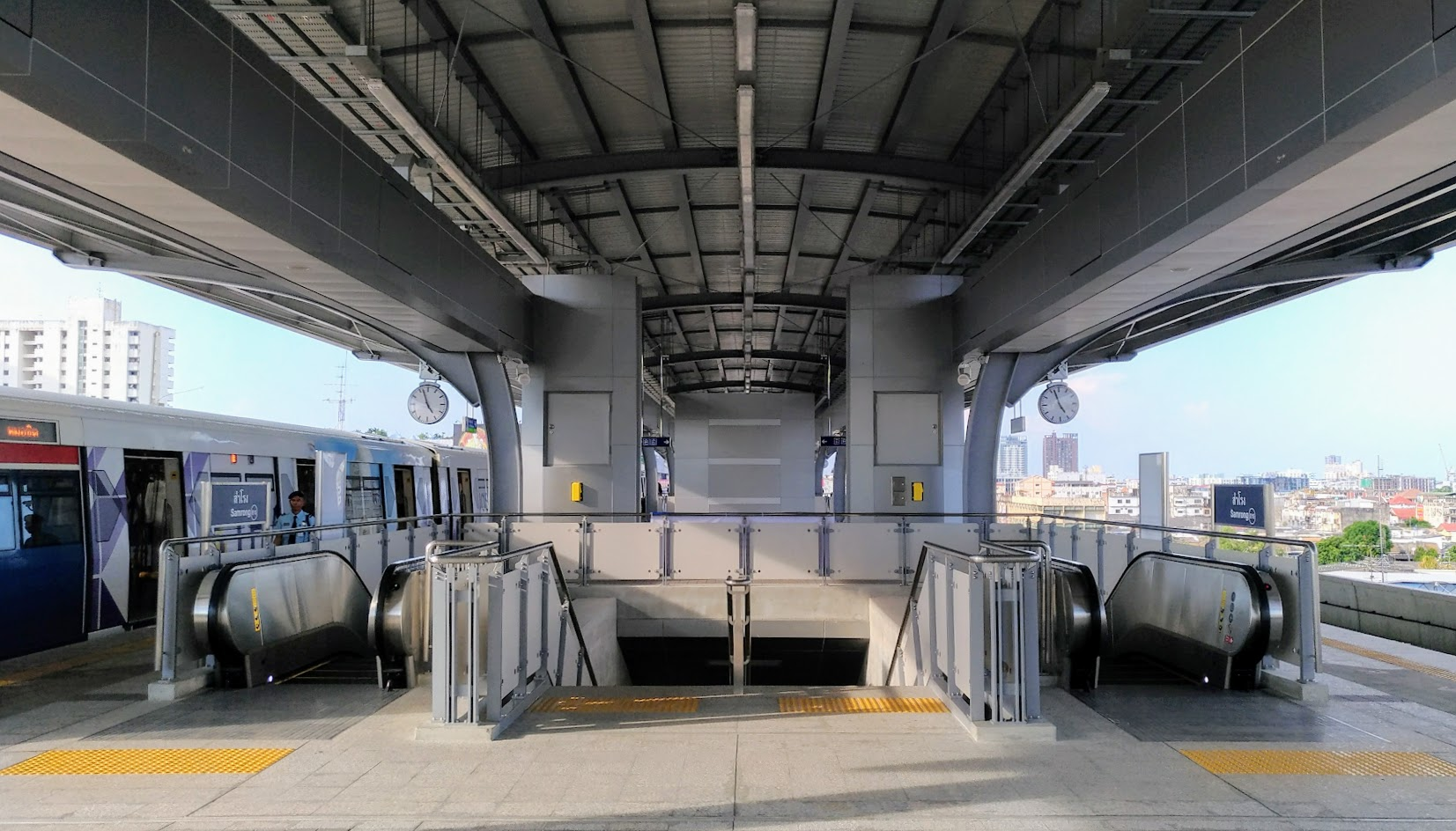
BTS station platform before installing platform gates

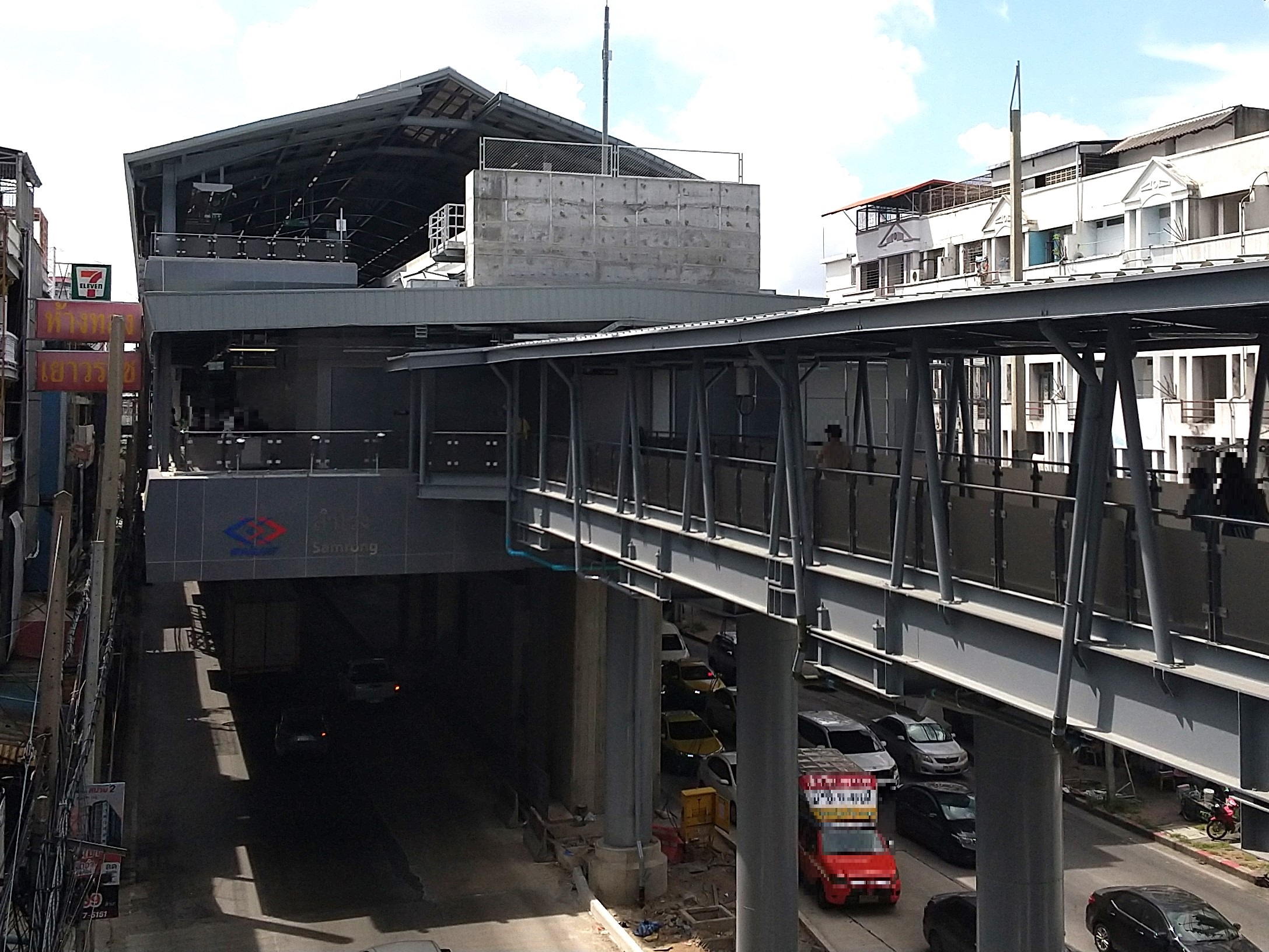
MRT station exterior

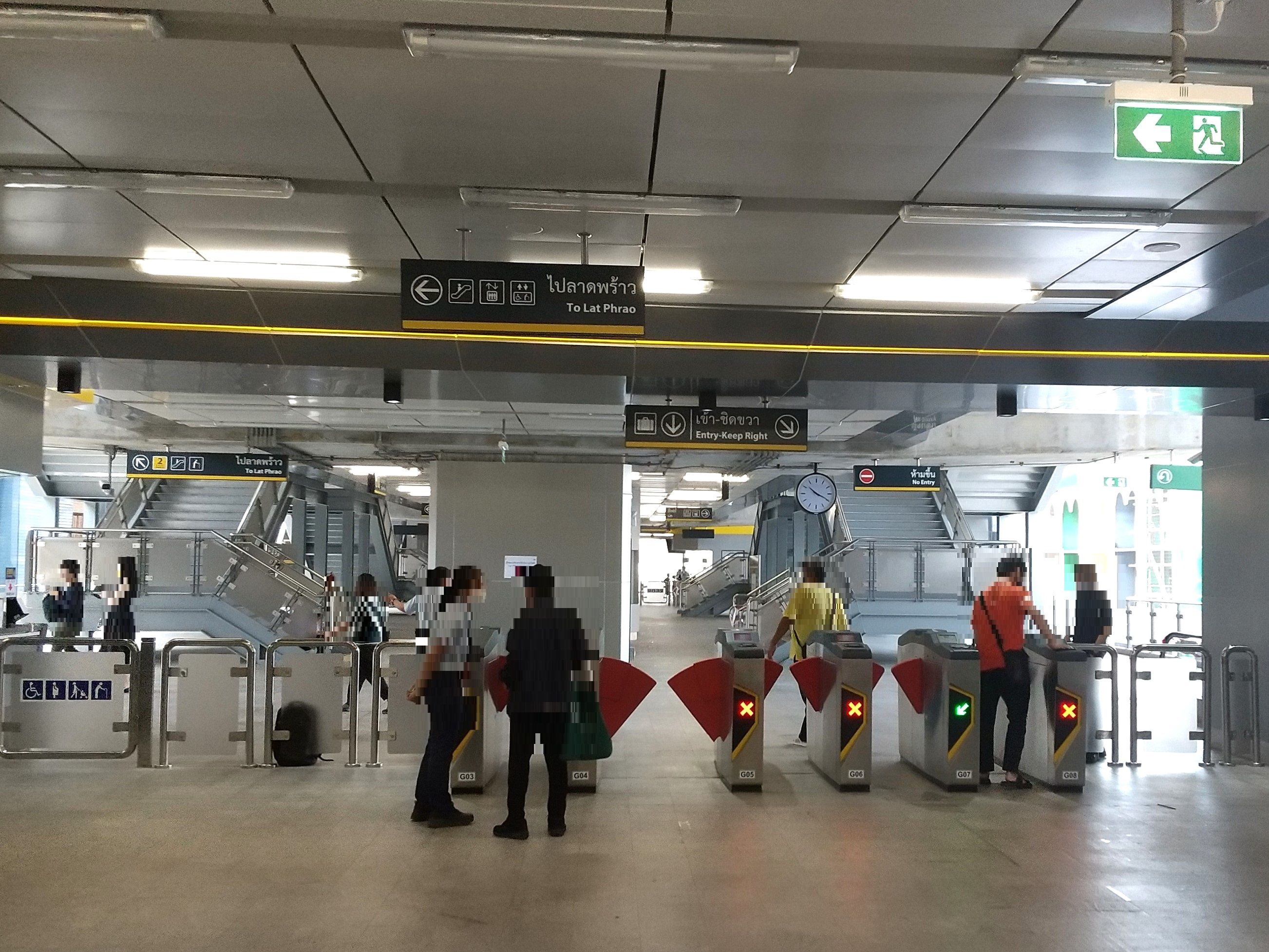
MRT station concourse

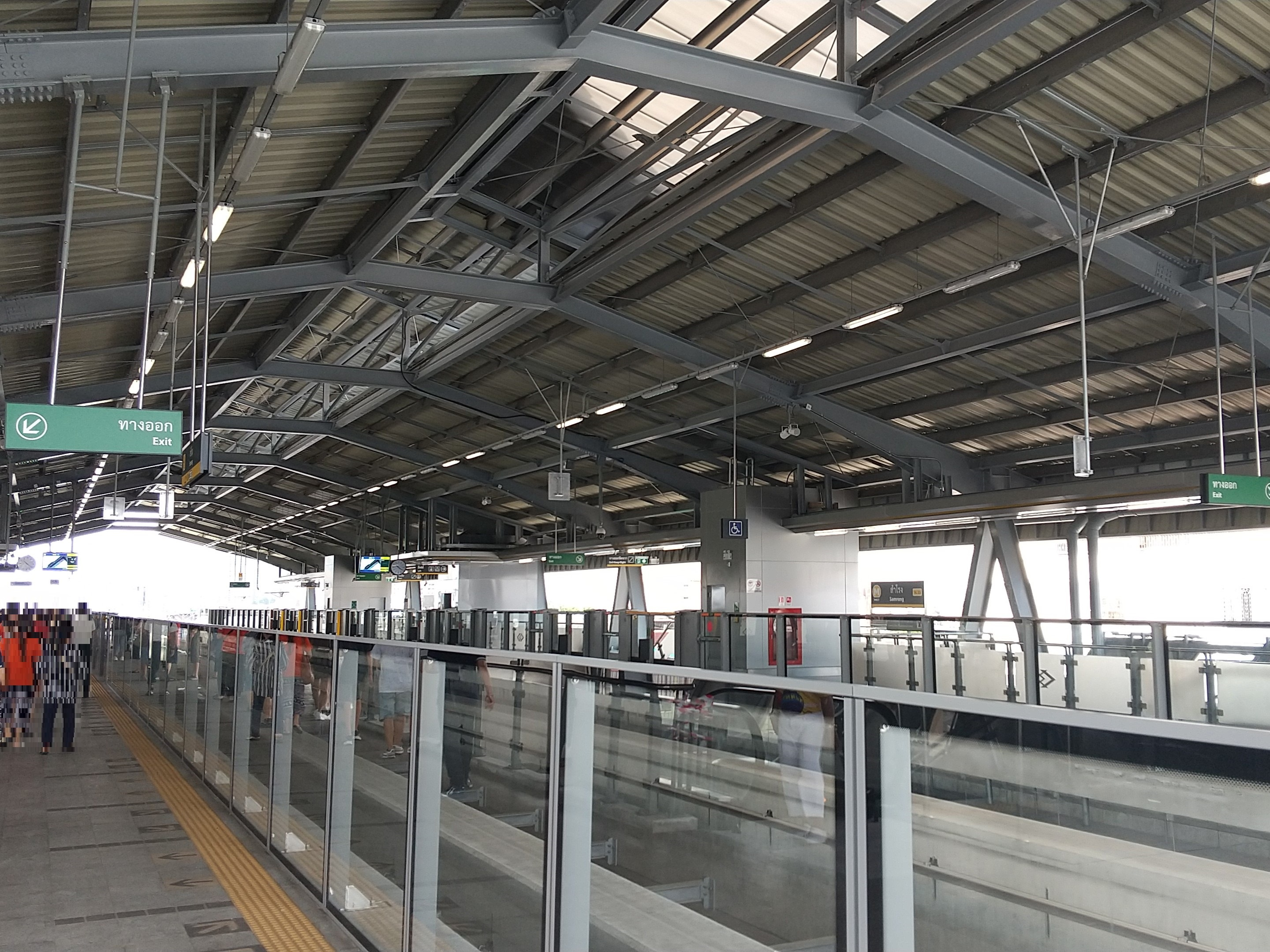
MRT station platforms

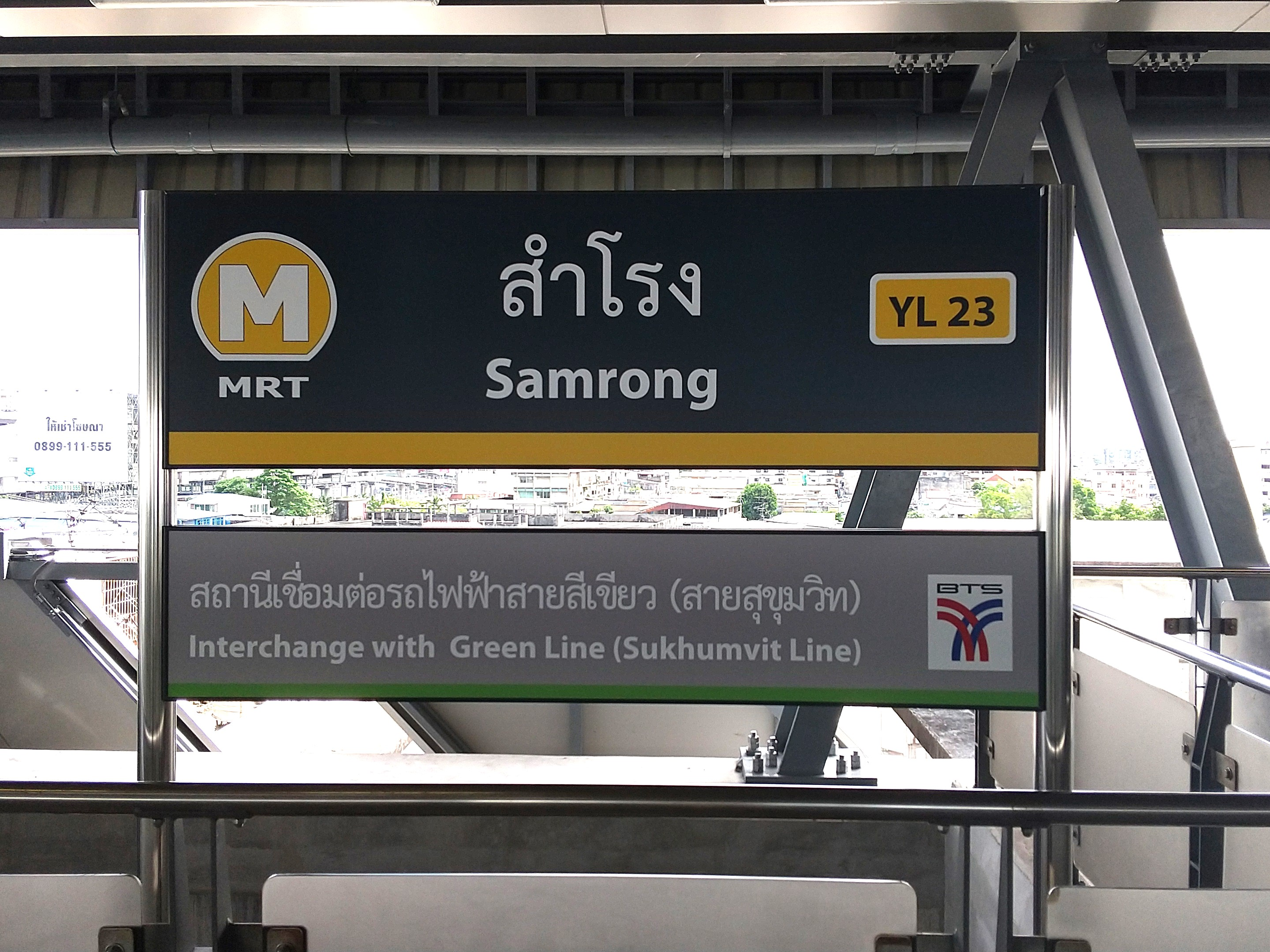
MRT station signage

== See also ==
- Bangkok Skytrain
