= Saint Louis BTS station =

BTS Skytrain station in Bangkok

Saint Louis เซนต์หลุยส์
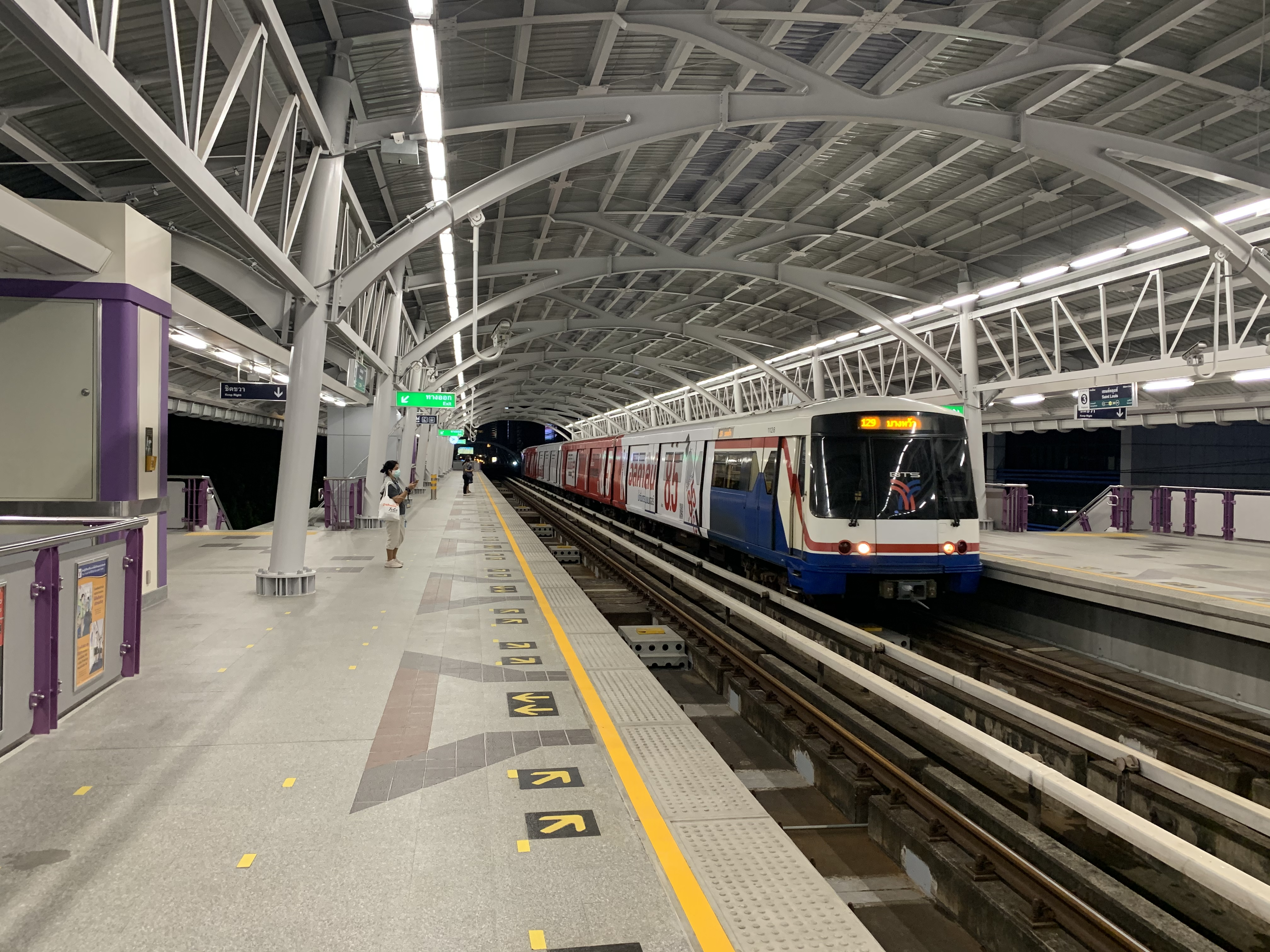
- A train approaching the Saint Louis Station at night, May 2021

General information
- Location: Bang Rak and Sathon; Bangkok; Thailand
- Coordinates: 13.7209°N 100.5268°E
- Owner: Bangkok Metropolitan Administration (BMA); BTS Rail Mass Transit Growth Infrastructure Fund (BTSGIF)
- Operator: Bangkok Mass Transit System; Public Company Limited (BTSC)
- Line: Silom Line

Construction
- Structure type: Elevated

Other information
- Station code: S4

History
- Opened: 8 February 2021; 5 years ago
- Former names: Suksa Witthaya

Passengers
- 2021: 673,475

Services
Preceding station	BTS Skytrain	Following station
Chong Nonsi towards National Stadium	Silom Line	Surasak towards Bang Wa
Location

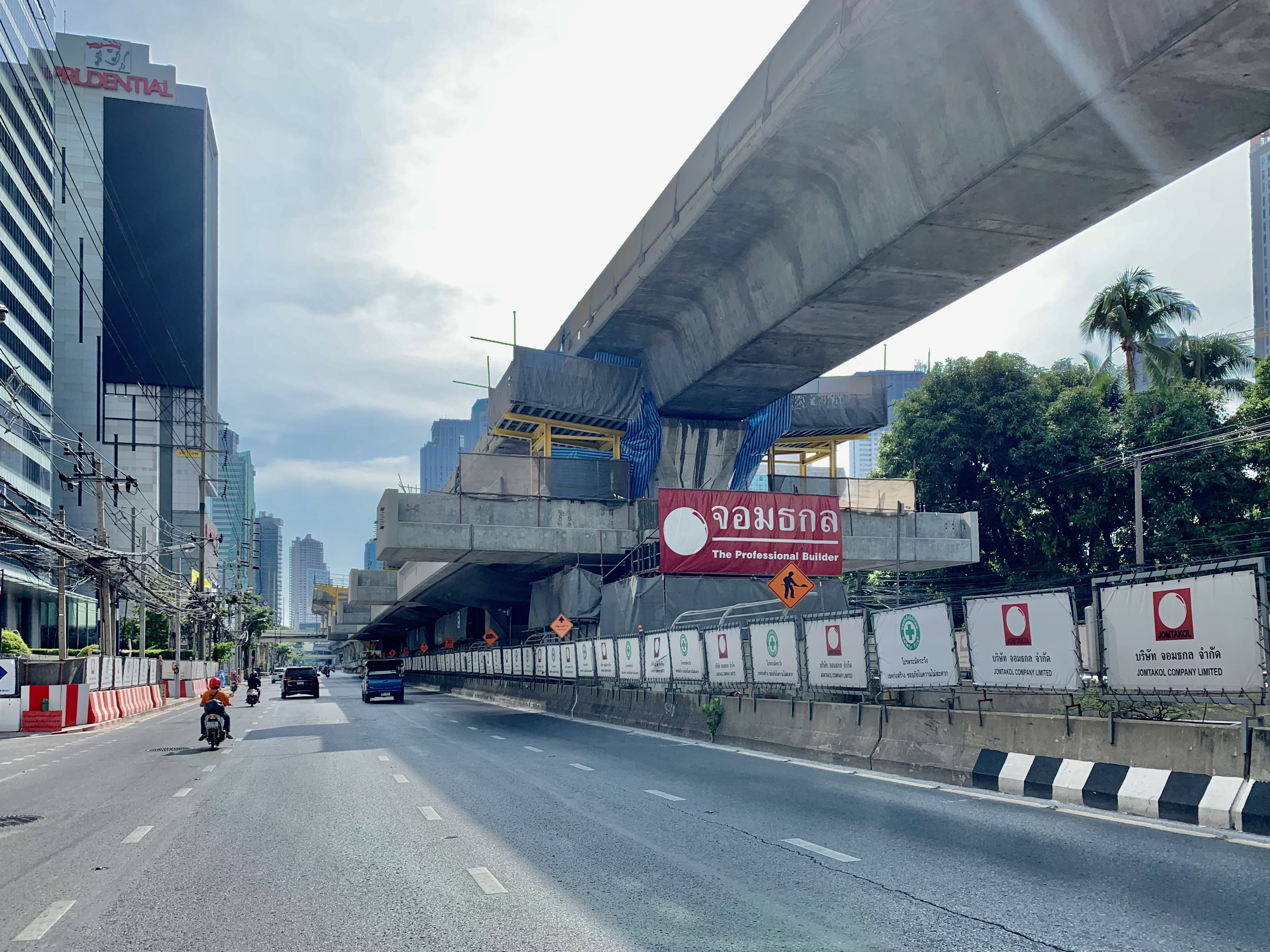
Saint Louis station during construction, May 2020

Saint Louis Station (Thai: สถานีเซนต์หลุยส์, RTGS: Sathani Sen Lui, pronounced [sā.tʰǎː.nīː sēn lǔj]) or former name Suksa Witthaya Station (Thai: สถานีศึกษาวิทยา, RTGS: Sathani Sueksa Witthaya, [sā.thǎː.nīː sɯ̀k.sǎː wít.tʰā.jāː]) is an infill BTS Skytrain station, on the Silom Line in Bangkok, Thailand. The name Saint Louis is of the neighbourhood surrounding the Saint Louis Catholic Church and the affiliated Saint Louis Hospital on the Sathon Tai Road.

It is a station on the Silom Line between Chong Nonsi and Surasak, and opened on 8 February 2021.

In 2018, it was decided to finally build the missing Suksa Witthaya (S4) station, the environment impact assessment was finalized in March 2019. Construction of the station began in August 2019 and by the end of 2019 had reached 25% progress. By August 2020, construction had reached 50% but was 30% behind schedule due to COVID related delays. The station opened on 8 February 2021.

== Station layout ==
U3; Platform	Side platform, doors will open on the left
U3; Platform	Platform 4	Silom Line toward National Stadium (Chong Nonsi)
U3; Platform	Platform 3	Silom Line toward Bang Wa (Surasak)
U3; Platform	Side platform, doors will open on the left
U2 ticket sales class	ticket sales floor	Exit 1–5, Passenger Service Center; Ticket Office, Ticket Machine, Shop; AIA Sathorn Tower
G Street level	-	Bus Stop @Sathorn, Bangrak Hospital, Saint Louis Hospital
