= Surasak BTS station =

Surasak สุรศักดิ์
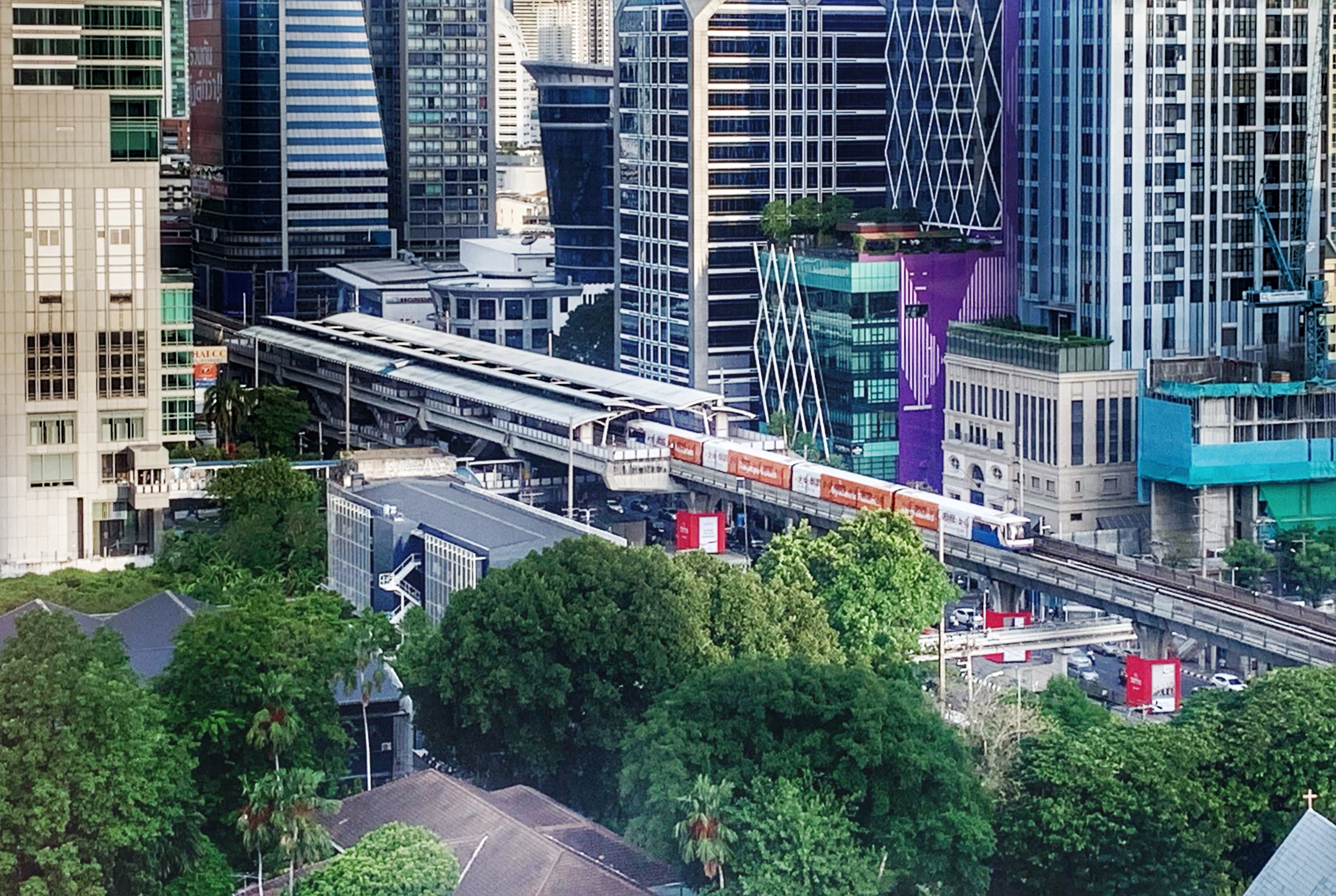
- Surasak station from distance, 2019

General information
- Location: Bang Rak and Sathon; Bangkok; Thailand
- Coordinates: 13°43′09″N 100°31′17″E
- Owner: Bangkok Metropolitan Administration (BMA); BTS Rail Mass Transit Growth Infrastructure Fund (BTSGIF)
- Operator: Bangkok Mass Transit System; Public Company Limited (BTSC)
- Line: Silom Line

Construction
- Structure type: Elevated

Other information
- Station code: S5

History
- Opened: 5 December 1999; 26 years ago

Passengers
- 2021: 1,198,528

Services
Preceding station	BTS Skytrain	Following station
Saint Louis towards National Stadium	Silom Line	Saphan Taksin towards Bang Wa
Location

Surasak station (Thai: สถานีสุรศักดิ์) is a BTS skytrain station, on the Silom Line in Bang Rak and Sathon districts, Bangkok, Thailand. The station is located on Sathon Road to the east of Sathon-Surasak intersection. The surrounding area along Sathon Road is primarily a business zone with many office towers and embassies. Holiday Inn Bangkok Silom is a 5-mins walk, Bangkok Christian College and Saint Louis Church are within walking distance to the east of the station.

== Station layout ==
U3; Platform	Side platform, doors will open on the left
U3; Platform	Platform 4	Silom Line toward National Stadium (Saint Louis)
U3; Platform	Platform 3	Silom Line toward Bang Wa (Saphan Taksin)
U3; Platform	Side platform, doors will open on the left
U2 ticket sales class	ticket sales floor	Exit 1–4, Passenger Service Center; Ticket Office, Ticket Machine, Shop; Eastin Grand Hotel Sathorn
G Street level	-	Bus Stop @Sathorn, Bangrak Hospital, Saint Louis Hospital

== Incident ==
On the evening of 20 August 2022, a person slipped and fell backwards on the ascending escalator at Exit 3 causing commuters behind to tumble on top of each other, resulting in 28 injuries. The event occurred as concert-goers were returning home under heavy rain, from a concert held at the nearby Bangkok Christian College in commemoration of the school's 170th year.

== See also ==
- Bangkok Skytrain
