= Louis Chorin =

French Catholic bishop (1888-1965)

The Right Reverend Louis August Chorin MEP
- Vicar Apostolic of Bangkok
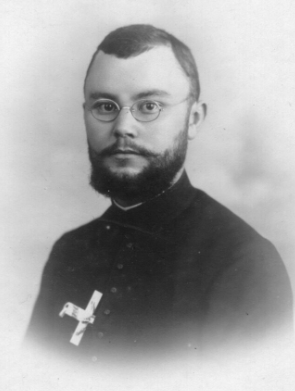
- Chorin as a priest C.1910s
- Predecessor: René Perros
- Successor: Joseph Khiamsun Nittayo

Orders
- Ordination: 29 September 1912 as priest and 10 July 1947 as Vicar Apostolic of Bangkok and Titular Bishop of Polystylus
- Consecration: 5 October 1947 by Bishop Octave-Louis Pasquet

Personal details
- Born: 17 July 1888 Alençon
- Died: 29 April 1965 (aged 76) Bangkok
- Denomination: Roman Catholic

Louis August Chorin MEP (17 July 1888 – 29 April 1965) was a French Roman Catholic missionary and bishop who served as Vicar Apostolic of Bangkok from 1947 to 1965.

== Biography ==
Chorin was born on 16 July 1888 in Alençon. He was raised by his mother alone who was a lady-in-waiting for the Countess of Semallé. After completing his education at La Chapelle Montligeon, Orne, he entered the minor seminary at Séez. In 1908, he entered the Paris Foreign Missions Society seminary, and was ordained a priest on 29 September 1912.

In November 1912, he was sent as a missionary to Siam and arrived at Bangkok on 31 December. He was assigned to work in Bang Nok Khwaek as vicar by Bishop Perros where he learned Chinese. Later, he was recalled to Bangkok as director of the printing press at the Church of Assumption, and during the First World War, he published the magazine "Sangha Samphan". In 1925, he was appointed procurator of the Bangkok Mission, and in 1932 built a four-storey building in Bangkok to replace the old missionary.

On 10 July 1947, he was appointed titular bishop of Polystylos and coadjutor to Bishop Perros. He was consecrated on 5 October 1947 in the basilica of La Chapelle-Montligeon, by Bishop Pasquet, Bishop of Séez, and assisted by Bishop Piquet, Apostolic Vicar in Vietnam.

Later, in 1947, Bishop Perros retired as Vicar Apostolic of Bangkok due to ill health and went to live in Chiang Mai, and Chorin took over the entire management of the Vicariate of Bangkok. In 1952, on the death of Bishop Perros, Chorin succeeded him as Apostolic Vicar of Bangkok.

Whilst in office he oversaw the expansion of the Mission in Thailand. In 1951, he established the new apostolic prefecture of Chiang Mai and entrusted its management to the Fathers of Bétharram, and in 1965, he established a new independent mission at Ubon. In 1957, he founded the St Louis Church next to St Louis Hospital, Sathon Road, Bangkok. He also promoted the establishment of Catholic organisations in Thailand such as the Society of St Vincent de Paul, the Congregation of the Pallama, the Congregation of the Catholic Young Workers, and the Catholic Teachers' Association. To promote the Catholic Church in Thailand, he chose a Thai coadjutor on 13 September 1963, Joseph Khiamsun Nittayo, who subsequently succeeded him.

Having been ill for some time, Chorin died on 29 April 1965 in Bangkok, aged 76.
