= René Perros =

French Roman catholic bishop (1870-19520

The Right Reverend René Marie Joseph Perros MEP
- Vicar Apostolic of Eastern Siam (later Bangkok)
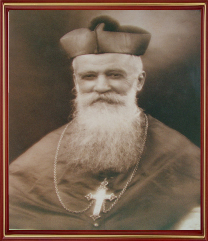
- Installed: 1909
- Term ended: 1947
- Predecessor: Jean-Louis Vey
- Successor: Louis Chorin

Orders
- Ordination: 15 October 1893 as priest, and 17 September 1909 as Vicar Vicar Apostolic of Eastern Siam and as Titular Bishop of Zoara
- Consecration: 30 January 1910 by Bishop Émile Barillon of Malacca

Personal details
- Born: 12 March 1870 Strasbourg
- Died: 27 November 1952 (aged 82) Bangkok
- Denomination: Roman Catholic

René Marie Joseph Perros MEP (12 March 1870 – 27 November 1952) was a French Roman Catholic missionary and bishop who served as Vicar Apostolic of Eastern Siam from 1909 to 1947.

== Biography ==
Perros was born on 12 March 1870 in Strasbourg. He was educated at the College of Lachapelle-sous-Rougemont, Belfort. In 1887, he entered the Paris Foreign Missions Society seminary, and was ordained a priest in 1893.

In 1893, he was assigned to the Siam Mission of the MEP and worked in various capacities. His first posting was as vicar in Nakhon Chai Si. In 1896, he served as professor in the Bangxang Seminary, and was also attached to the College of the Sacred Heart of Jesus, Bannokheuk. He subsequently served as vicar at the church of Muang Phanatsenikom in Monthon Patchim, and in Maha Rat District.

In 1909, on the death of Jean-Louis Vey, Vicar Apostolic of Eastern Siam, he succeeded to the episcopate of the Siam Mission as Vicar Apostolic of Eastern Siam, and at the same time was appointed Titular Bishop of Zoara. He was consecrated bishop at the Holy Rosary Church, Bangkok on 30 January 1910.

On the outbreak of the First World War in 1914, he was mobilised, aged 44, on receipt of a telegram from the French government. He immediately left Bangkok, and joined the French Army one month later. He was gazetted Captain, sent to Belfort, and permitted to act as military chaplain and to wear the episcopal cassock and cross. In 1915, he was released from further military service by the French government, and he returned to the Siam Mission where he arrived on 16 October 1915.

During his years in office, the Catholic Mission spread to all parts of Siam. Missionaries were sent to work in Northwest Siam, in Chiang Mai, Chiang Rai and Lampang, and in the North, and their presence was extended to Nakhon Ratchasima. New seminaries were opened to train priests and missionaries including Sri Racha Seminary in 1935.

In 1947, Perros, then as Vicar Apostolic of Bangkok, the title having been changed from Vicar Apostolic of Eastern Siam in 1924, retired due to ill health and went to live in Chiang Mai as Apostolic Emeritus of Bangkok. He died at St Louis Hospital, Bangkok on 27 November 1952, aged 82.
