= St. Louis station =

St. Louis, Saint Louis, or Saint-Louis may refer to several transportation facilities:

- Saint-Louis station, the main train station in Saint-Louis, Haut-Rhin, France
- Saint Louis BTS station, a rapid transit station in Bangkok, Thailand
- Gateway Transportation Center, the main train station in St. Louis, Missouri, U.S.
- St. Louis Union Station, a disused train station in St. Louis, Missouri, U.S.
