= Jules Eugène Marius Topenot =

French diplomat (1881–1923)

- Born: 25 October 1881
- Died: 9 July 1923 (aged 41); Bangkok
- Occupation: Diplomat
- Years active: 1904-1923
- Spouse: Mme. Topenot
- Children: 3

Jules Eugène Marius Topenot ( 25 October 1881 – 9 July 1923) was a French diplomat and linguist who served in Siam (now Thailand).

== Career ==
Jules Eugene Marius Topenot was born on 25 October 1881, and joined the French diplomatic service as an interpreter based in Bangkok in 1904. Later, he was involved in the delimitation of the Franco-Siamese frontier as a boundary commissioner for which he was awarded the Fourth Class Order of Mongkot in 1908.

In 1912, he was promoted to acting consul in Ubon. When the First World War broke out he travelled to France via Saigon to enlist and joined as sergeant, later being promoted to sub-lieutenant. He spent about two years on active service, was mentioned in dispatches and received the Croix de Geurre, and returned to Siam, serving as vice-consul and First Interpreter in Bangkok. In 1921 he was promoted to consul, and in 1922 was appointed chargé d'affaires. The following year, he died of heart failure at the Saint Louis Hospital, Bangkok, leaving a widow and three children.

== Honours ==
In 1922, he was awarded the Chevalier of the Légion d'Honneur.
