= Silom Line =

Elevated rapid transit line in Bangkok, Thailand

BTS Silom Line สายสีลม

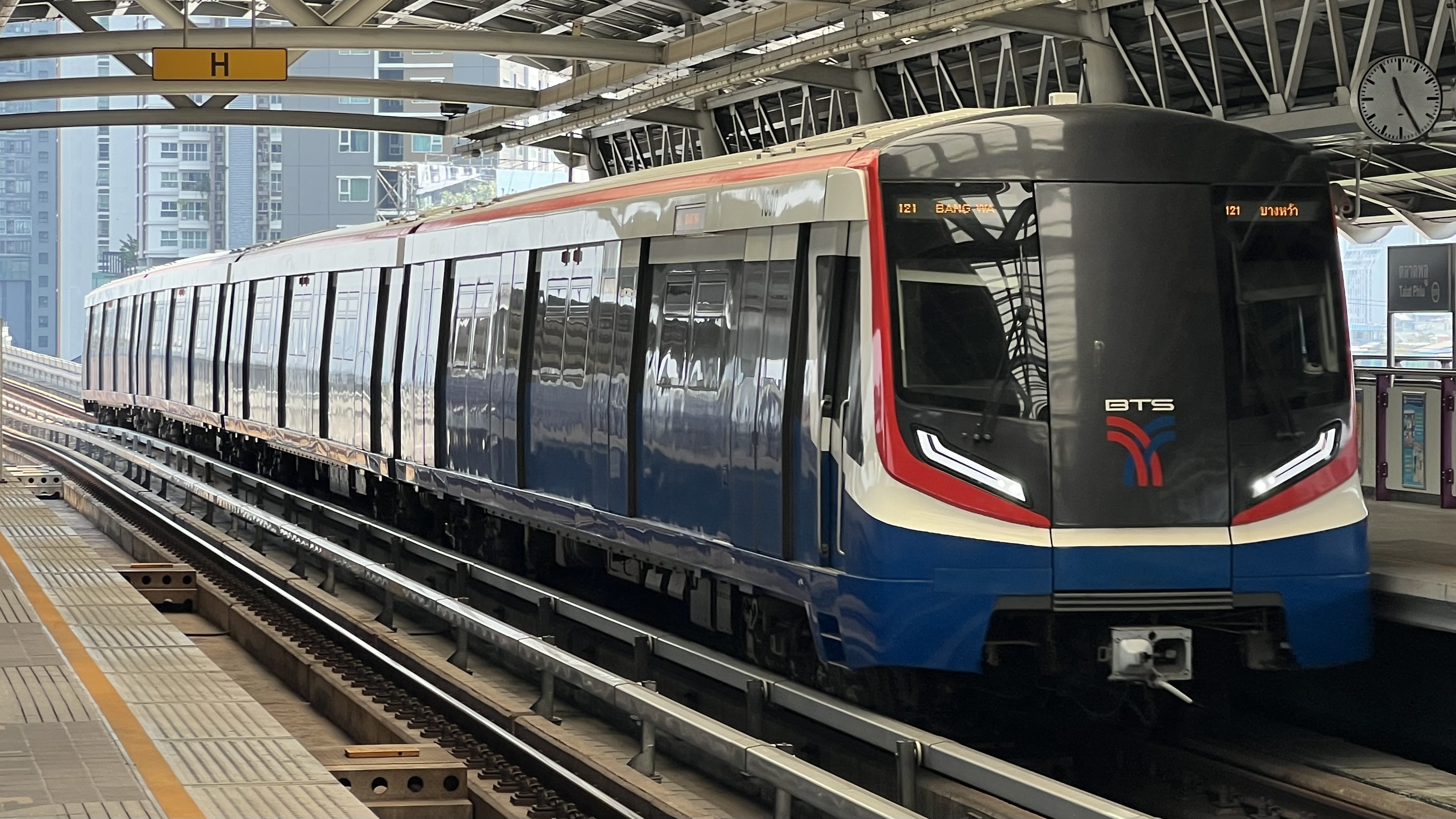
- EMU-B3 at Talat Phlu Station

Overview
- Owner: Bangkok Metropolitan Administration
- Locale: Bangkok
- Termini: National Stadium; Bang Wa
- Stations: 14 (operational); 14 (planned)
- Color on map: Dark Green

Service
- Type: Rapid transit
- System: BTS Skytrain
- Operator: Bangkok Mass Transit System Public Company Limited
- Depot(s): Mo Chit Depot (shared with BTS ) Khu Khot Depot (shared with BTS ) Bang Wa Depot
- Rolling stock: Siemens Modular Metro; EMU-A1: 35 four-car trains Siemens Bozankaya; EMU-A2: 22 four-car trains CNR Changchun Railway Vehicles; EMU-B1: 12 four-car trains CNR Changchun Railway Vehicles; EMU-B2: 5 four-car trains CRRC Changchun Railway Vehicles; EMU-B3: 24 four-car trains
- Daily ridership: 926,294 ( BTS and BTS ) 30 August 2024

History
- Work began: 9 April 1992; 34 years ago
- Opened: 5 December 1999; 26 years ago
- Last extension: 8 February 2021; 5 years ago

Technical
- Line length: 13.09 km (8.13 mi)
- Character: Fully elevated
- Track gauge: 1,435 mm (4 ft 8 1/2 in) standard gauge
- Electrification: 750 V DC third rail
- Operating speed: 80 km/h (50 mph)
- Signalling: Former: Siemens Trainguard LZB700M fixed block ATC under ATO GoA 2 (STO); Current: Bombardier CITYFLO 450 moving block CBTC ATC under ATO GoA 2 (STO), with subsystems of ATP, ATS and CBI

The Elevated Train in Commemoration of HM the King's 6th Cycle Birthday 2nd line (Thai: รถไฟฟ้าเฉลิมพระเกียรติ 6 รอบพระชนมพรรษา สาย 2), also known as Silom Line (Thai: สายสีลม), is one of the rapid transit lines of the BTS Skytrain System in Bangkok, Thailand.The line runs eastward from National Stadium Station in Pathum Wan District over Rama I Road and interchanges with the Sukhumvit Line at Siam station, then turns southward, following Ratchadamri, Si Lom, Naradhiwas Rajanagarindra and Sathon Roads to Taksin Bridge where it crosses the Chao Phraya River to the Thonburi side of Bangkok and Wong Wian Yai. It continues west along the Ratchaphruek Road before it terminates at Bang Wa Station in Phasi Charoen District.

The line was first opened on 5 December 1999, along with the Sukhumvit Line. Both lines are operated by the Bangkok Mass Transit System Public Company Limited under a 30-year concession from the Bangkok Metropolitan Administration. When it opened, the line ran from National Stadium to Saphan Taksin stations covering a total distance of 6.5 km (4.0 mi) with 7 stations. Silom Line is one of the main arteries of the Bangkok Mass Rapid Transit System with 900,000 daily passengers per day (combined with the Sukhumvit Line).

== History ==
=== Original plan ===
The original alignment of the Silom line was for the line to being at a station near the intersection of Rama I Road and Rama VI Road, labelled W2 station, travelling above Rama I Road and meeting with the Sukhumvit Line, before turning south on Ratchadamri Road. The line was to continue straight on Si Lom Road until the Surasak Intersection, before turning south on Surasak Road, and west again on Sathorn Road, ending at a station labelled S5 and located on the Sathorn Bridge.

The depot for both lines was initially located at Lumphini Park. However, due to public backlash, it was relocated to the former site of the Northern Bus Terminal (also known as Mo Chit Bus Terminal) near Mo Chit station on the Sukhumvit Line. Several changes were made during the construction as follows:

- W2 station was deleted;
- CEN station was moved from the west side of Chaloem Phao junction to the west side;
- S2 station was changed from an island platform to side platforms;
- S3 station was moved from the west side of the Silom-Naradhiwas junction on Si Lom road to the middle of Naradhiwas Rajanagarindra Road, in front of Naradhiwas Rajanagarindra Soi 3;
- S4 station was moved from between Si Lom Soi 19 and Pramuan junction on Si Lom Road to the east side of the Embassy of Myanmar on Sathorn Road. The station was deferred during initial construction and was added as an infill station in 2021;
- A new station was added 200 metres west of the Sathorn-Surasak Intersection, assuming the S5 station code.
- The southern terminus, S6 station, was redesignated as S6. The station was meant to be temporary as it was slated to be demolished upon the completion of a subsequent extension to Thonburi.

=== Extensions ===
==== Wongwian Yai Extension ====
On 18 October 2005, with no approval from the central government forthcoming, Bangkok Metropolitan Administration (BMA) decided to fund and complete the 2.2 kilometers (1.4 mi) Silom Line route extension to Krung Thon Buri and Wongwian Yai Stations. Construction began on 13 December 2005 with completion originally expected within two years for a late 2007 opening. However, problems with the tendering and installation of a new Bombardier open signalling system repeatedly pushed back the schedule. The extension finally opening on 15 May 2009. However, the single platform Saphan Taksin station which has only one track, has caused repeated delays during rush hour. In 2012, the BMA announced plans to demolish Saphan Taksin station in the future. There are now plans to construct new platforms and remove the bottleneck and keep the station which provides an important link between river boats. The plan includes redesigning the road bridges either side of the viaduct to fit the new station.

==== Bang Wa Extension ====
The third extension to the network, a 5.3 km (3.3 mi), a four station extension from Wongwian Yai to Bang Wa in Phasi Charoen District began construction in the 2nd quarter of 2011, with a deadline of the end of 2012. Only the stations had to be constructed as the viaduct had been completed some years prior. However, construction was delayed for many months by the Bangkok floods of late 2011. It eventually opened in stages. Pho Nimit opened on 12 January 2013, Talat Phlu opened on 14 February 2013, with the last two stations opening on 5 December 2013. The extension was initially operated by a separate six-car shuttle service due to the absence of a turnout between Wongwian Yai and Talat Phlu stations. The remaining two stations Wutthakat and Bang Wa were opened on 5 December 2013.

==== Saint Louis station ====
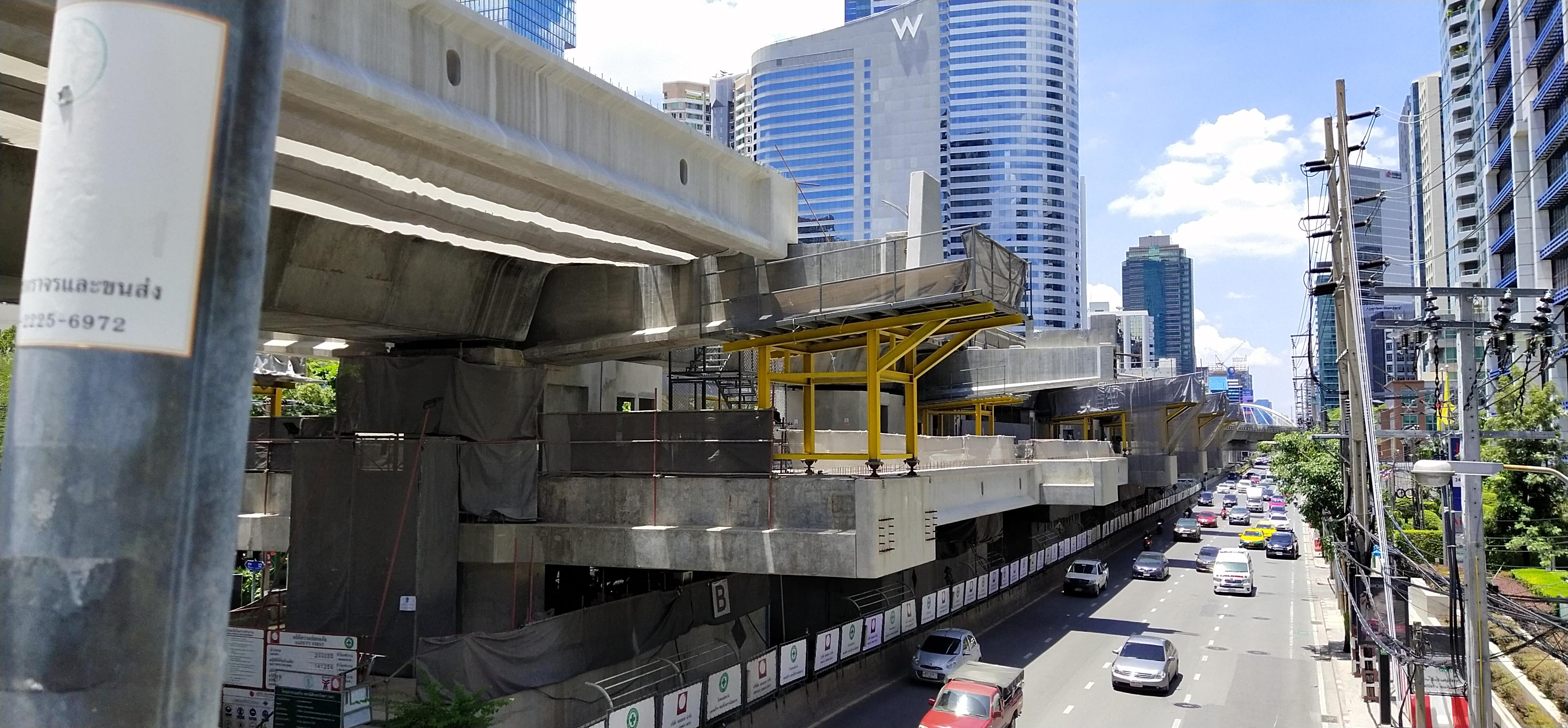
Saint Louis station under construction in 2020

In 2018, it was decided to finally build the missing Saint Louis station (originally named Sueksa Witthaya), the EIA was finalised in March 2019. Construction of the station began in August 2019 and by the end of 2019 had reached 25% progress. By August 2020, construction had reached 50% but was 30% behind schedule due to COVID related delays. The station was opened on 8 February 2021.

==== Taling Chan Extension (future) ====
After the opening of Wutthakat and Bang Wa stations 5 December 2013, the BMA announced a plan to further extend the Silom Line by 7.5 km (4.7 mi) from Bang Wa station to Taling Chan, adding six stations. Interchange to the SRT Light Red line would be made possible at Taling Chan. A motivation for this northern extension is that the BTS would conveniently connect to the Southern Bus Terminal.

A public hearing was held in 2015. Three alignments were studied with construction set to begin in 2017. In October 2018, the BMA Transport and Traffic Office completed an economic evaluation of the extension which found a cost benefit ratio of 2.37. The study recommended that an EIA be completed in 2019 but this was delayed.

The BMA has considered the possibility of a further extension north from Taling Chan to connect with the MRT Purple Line at Rattanathibet Road. This extension would add seven stations and 10 km (6.2 mi).

Code	Name		Planned Opening	Platform Type	Transfer
Code	English	Thai	Planned Opening	Platform Type	Transfer
↓ Continue from Bang Wa ↓
	Bang Waek	บางแวก	TBA	Side	
	Bang Cheauk Nang	บางเชือกหนัง	TBA	Side	
	Bang Phrom	บางพรม	TBA	Side	
	Intharawat	อินทราวาส	TBA	Side	
	Borommaratchachonnani	บรมราชชนนี	TBA	Side	
	Taling Chan	ตลิ่งชัน	TBA	Side	Connecting station to • SRT • MRT (future) • SRT Southern Line
	Bang Kruai	บางกรวย	TBA	Side	
	Rama 5	พระราม 5	TBA	Side	
	Thanon Bang Kruai–Sai Noi	บางกรวย-ไทรน้อย	TBA	Side	
	Triam Udom Suksa Pattanakarn School Nonthaburi	เตรียมพัฒน์	TBA	Side	
	Om Non	อ้อมนนท์	TBA	Side	
	Bang Rak Noi	บางรักน้อย	TBA	Side	
	Bang Rak Noi Tha It	บางรักน้อยท่าอิฐ	TBA	Side	Connecting station to • MRT

==== Yot Se Extension ====
Silom Line is planned to be extended by two stations west from National Stadium to link with the SRT Dark Red line at Yot Se station. However, no time frame for this extension has been announced and this section of the SRT Dark Red Line will not be built until after 2022.

Originally, the plan was to extend the Silom Line west from National Stadium into Chinatown, then north to Democracy Monument where it would then run west to Rattanakosin Island and Sanam Luang, tunnel under the river to the Thonburi side before terminating at Phran Nok. However, this plan was shelved back in 2009 and much of this route has been replaced by alignment changes to the MRT Orange line which is under construction.

Code	Name		Planned Opening	Platform Type	Transfer
Code	English	Thai	Planned Opening	Platform Type	Transfer
↓ Continue from National Stadium ↓
	Yot Se	ยศเส	TBA	Side	Connecting station to SRT

== Opening timeline ==
Date	Project	Notes
5 December 1999	Bangkok Transit System	Full commercial service was commenced from National Stadium to Saphan Taksin stations along with the Sukhumvit Line.
15 May 2009	Wongwian Yai Extension	Service extended to Wongwian Yai station.
14 May 2010		Silom Line was closed from 17.00 onwards due to 2010 Thai military crackdown.
29 May 2010		Resumed normal service.
12 January 2013	Bang Wa Extension	Shuttle service has been deployed between Wongwian Yai and Pho Nimit stations. with 3+3 car trains.
14 February 2013	Bang Wa Extension	Shuttle service extended to Talat Phlu station.
5 December 2013	Bang Wa Extension	Full commercial service was commenced from National Stadium to Bang Wa stations.
22 May 2014		Silom Line operated with limited hours from 6:00 to 21:00 due to the curfew, which was a result of the 2014 Thai coup d'état.
28 May 2014		Service hours were extended to 06.00-23.00
14 June 2014		Resumed normal service.
17 October 2020		Silom Line was temporarily closed from 15.00 due to the 2020–2021 Thai protests.
18 October 2020		Chong Nonsi, Surasak, Krung Thon Buri, and Wongwian Yai stations were temporarily closed due to the protests from 14.30
8 February 2021	BTS Saint Louis Extension	Saint Louis station was opened between Chong Nonsi and Surasak stations.
28 March 2025		All services were halted because of the 2025 Sagaing earthquake.
29 March 2025		Resumed normal service.

== Stations ==
Code	Station Name		Image	Opened	Platform Type	Transfers	Notes
Code	English	Thai	Image	Opened	Platform Type	Transfers	Notes
	National Stadium	สนามกีฬาแห่งชาติ		5 December 1999; 26 years ago	Side		
	Siam	สยาม		5 December 1999; 26 years ago	Stacked Island	Cross-platform interchange with BTS	
	Ratchadamri	ราชดำริ		5 December 1999; 26 years ago	Side		
	Sala Daeng	ศาลาแดง		5 December 1999; 26 years ago	Side	Connecting station to Si Lom for MRT	
	Chong Nonsi	ช่องนนทรี		5 December 1999; 26 years ago	Side	Connecting station to Sathorn for Bangkok BRT via Chong Nonsi Skywalk	
	Saint Louis	เซนต์หลุยส์		8 February 2021; 5 years ago	Side		Infill station
	Surasak	สุรศักดิ์		5 December 1999; 26 years ago	Side		
	Saphan Taksin	สะพานตากสิน		5 December 1999; 26 years ago	Side (single)	Connecting station to Sathorn Pier for; • Mine Smart Ferry • CHAOPHRAYA EXPRESS	The station will be closed for upgrading into a dual-platform configuration
	Krung Thon Buri	กรุงธนบุรี		15 May 2009; 17 years ago	Side	Connecting station to BTS	
	Wongwian Yai	วงเวียนใหญ่		15 May 2009; 17 years ago	Side	Connecting station to; • MRT , via 270-metre underground walkway (under construction) • SRT (future)	
	Pho Nimit	โพธิ์นิมิตร		12 January 2013; 13 years ago	Side		
	Talat Phlu	ตลาดพลู		14 February 2013; 13 years ago	Side	Connecting station to; • Ratchaphruek station for Bangkok BRT • MRL (south section; future)	
	Wutthakat	วุฒากาศ		5 December 2013; 12 years ago	Side	Connecting station to; • Mae Klong Railway (Wongwian Yai - Mahachai) • SRT (future)	
	Bang Wa	บางหว้า		5 December 2013; 12 years ago	Side	Connecting station to; • MRT • Khlong Phasi Charoen Boat Service	

== Rolling stock ==
Rolling stock of Silom Line

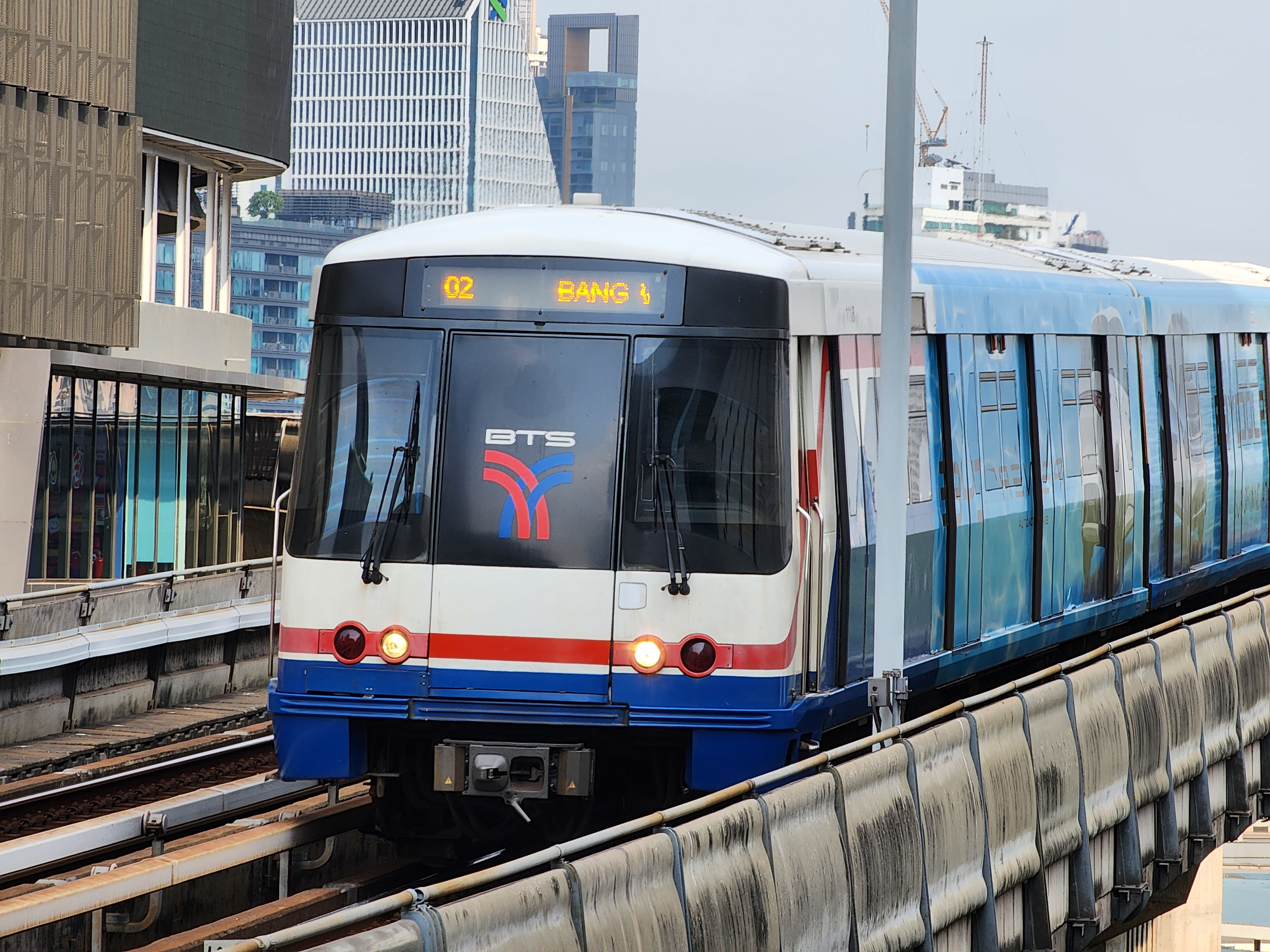
EMU-A1 approaching Sala Daeng station

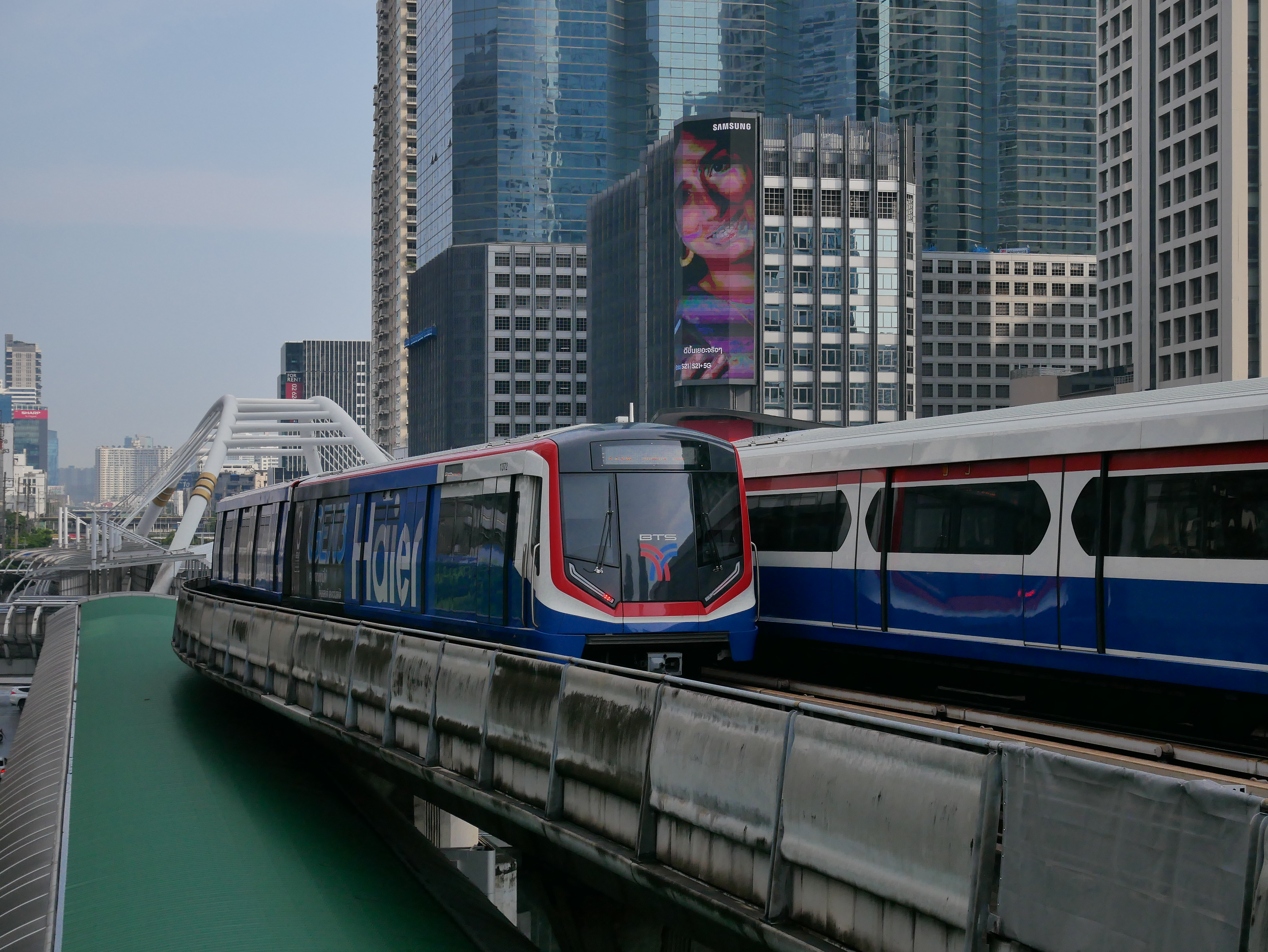
EMU-A2 approaching Chong Nonsi station

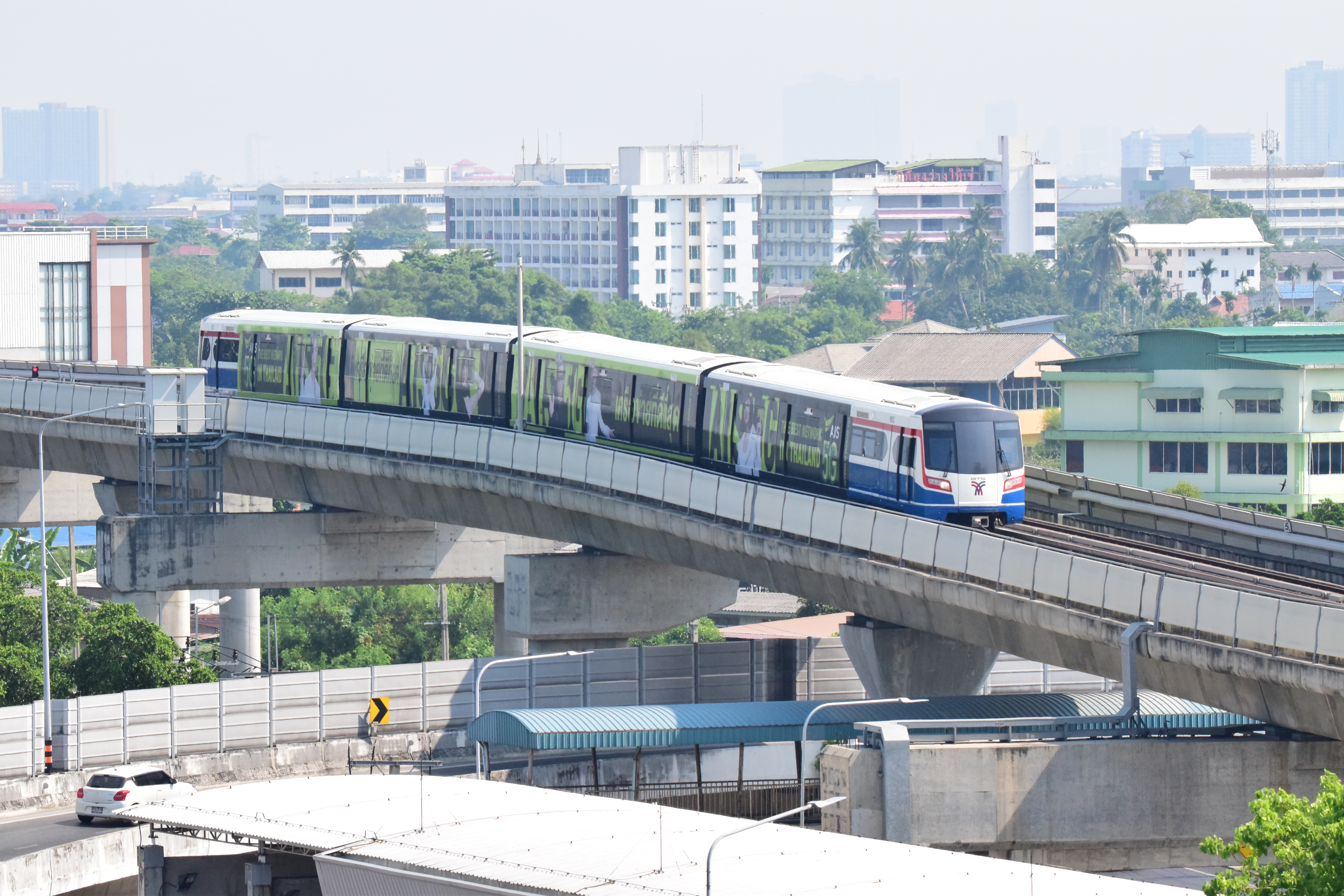
EMU-B1/B2 turn around outside of Bang Wa station

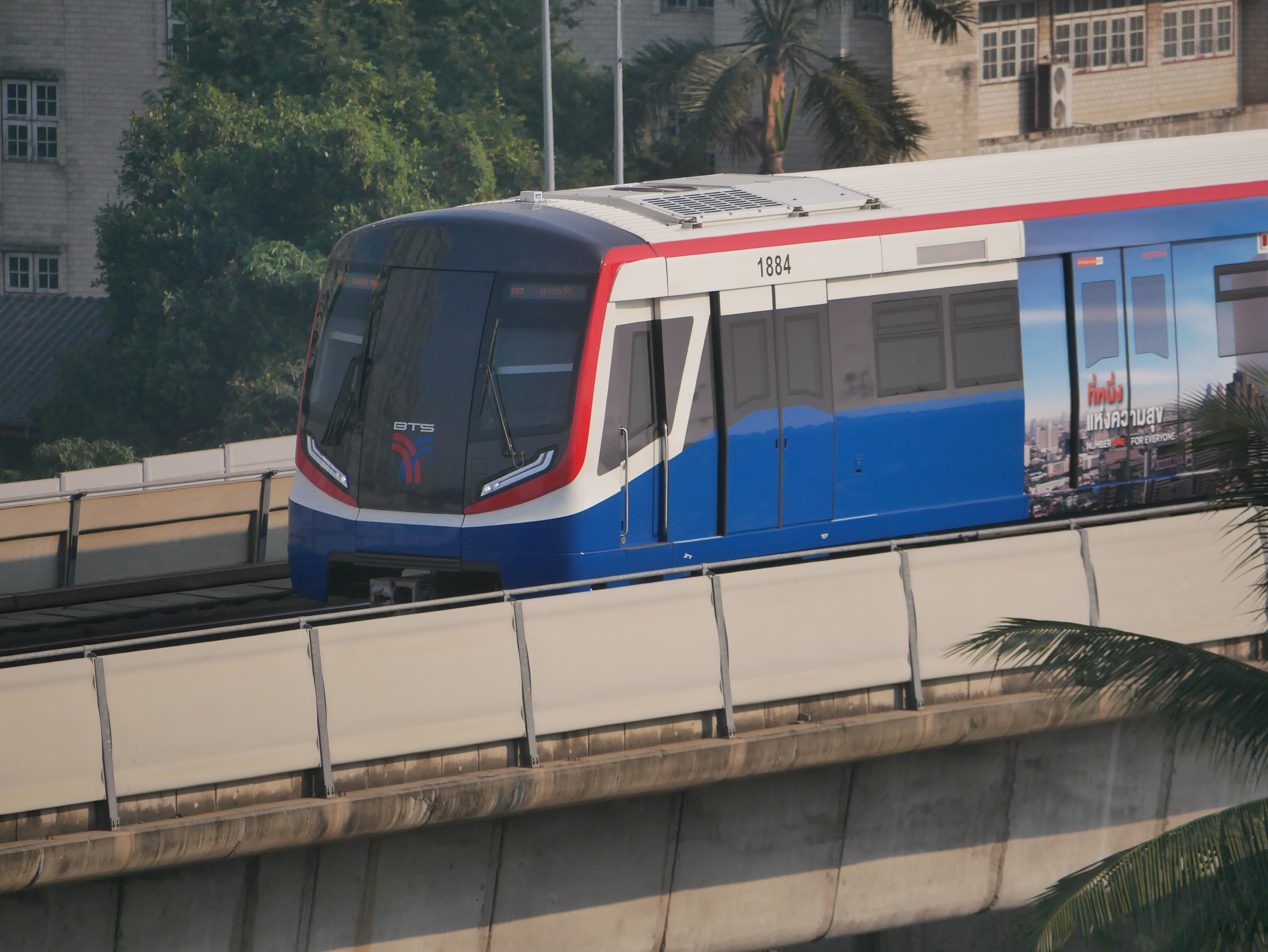
EMU-B3 approaching Bang Wa station

== Operation ==
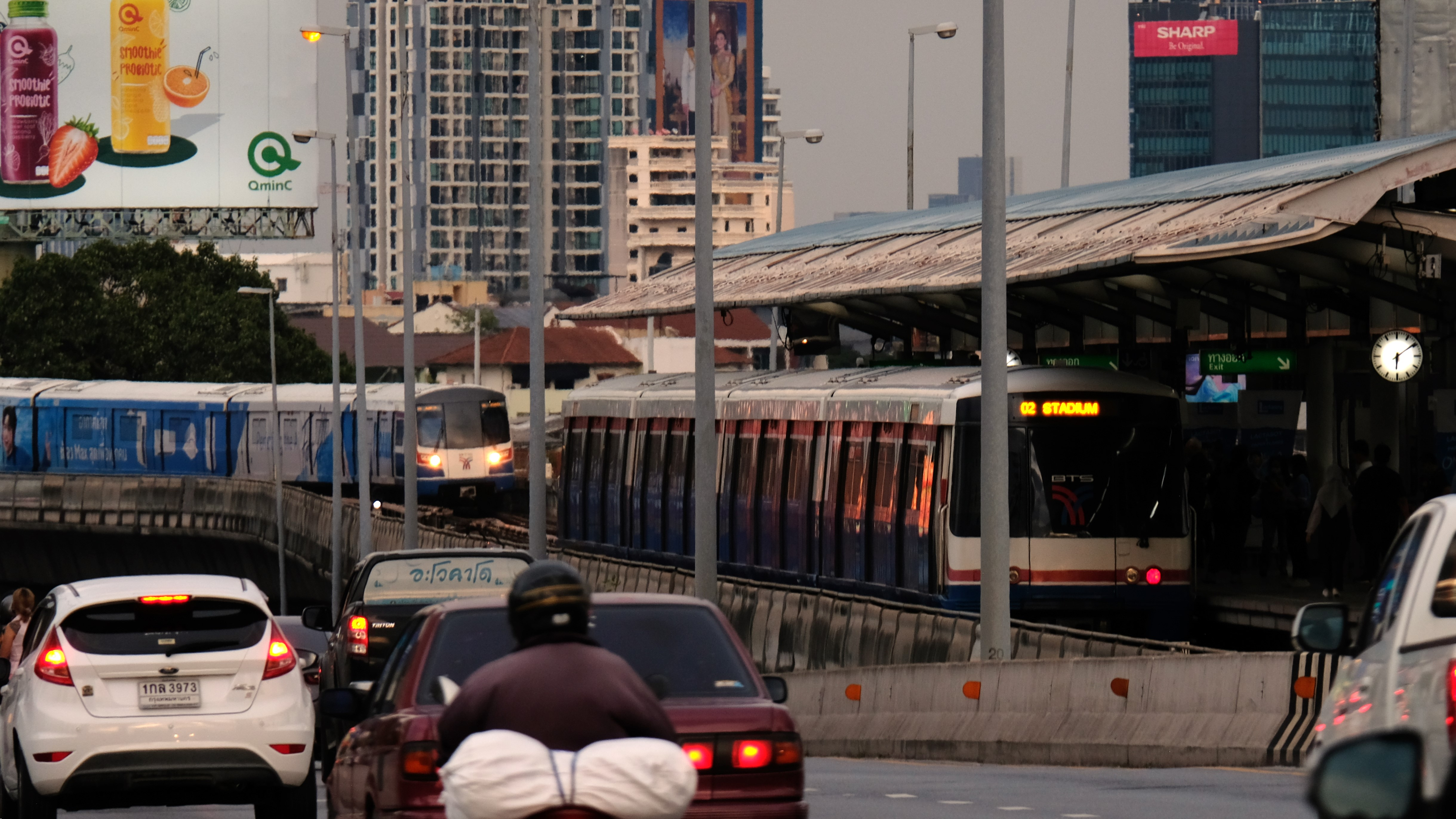
Saphan Taksin station is the only single-platform station in Bangkok Mass Rapid Transit system, causing a bottleneck on the Silom Line. This prevents increasing the train frequency to more than every 3 minutes and 45 seconds.

The Silom Line operates from 06:00 to 00:00 every day with some through-running trains to/from Mo Chit station on the Sukhumvit Line.

=== Headways ===
Silom Line headway
Time	Headway (Minutes:Seconds)
Monday - Friday
06:00 - 07:00	06:00
07:00 - 09:00	03:45
09:00 - 17:00	06:00
17:00 - 20:00	03:45
20:00 - 22:00	06:00
22:00 - 24:00	08:00
Saturday to Sunday and Public Holiday
06:00 - 09:00	07:00
09:00 - 21:00	05:40
21:00 - 22:00	07:00
22:00 - 24:00	08:00

== Gallery ==
Panorama View of Royal Bangkok Sports Club from Ratchadamri station
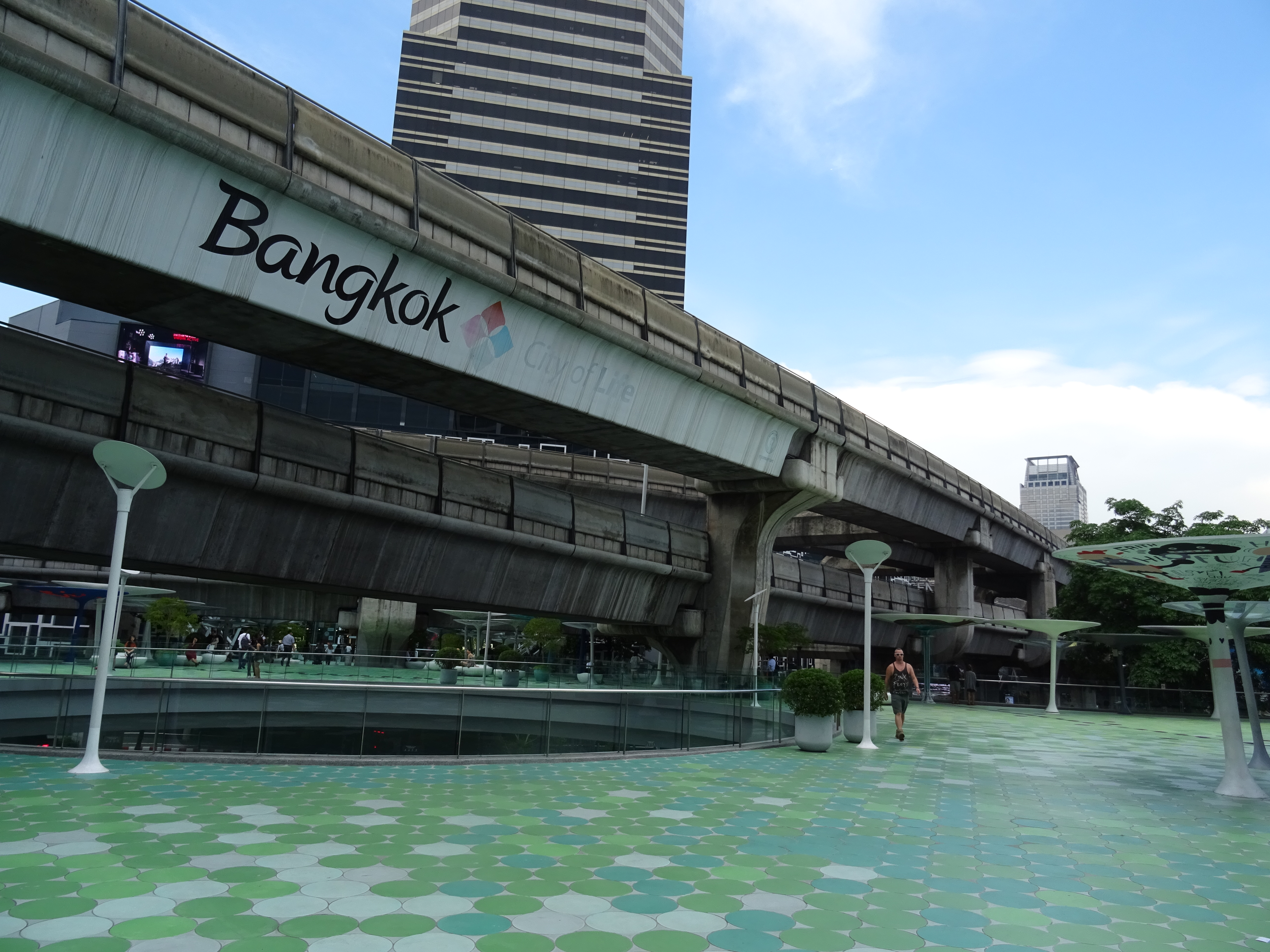
Viaduct of Silom Line at Pathumwan Skywalk

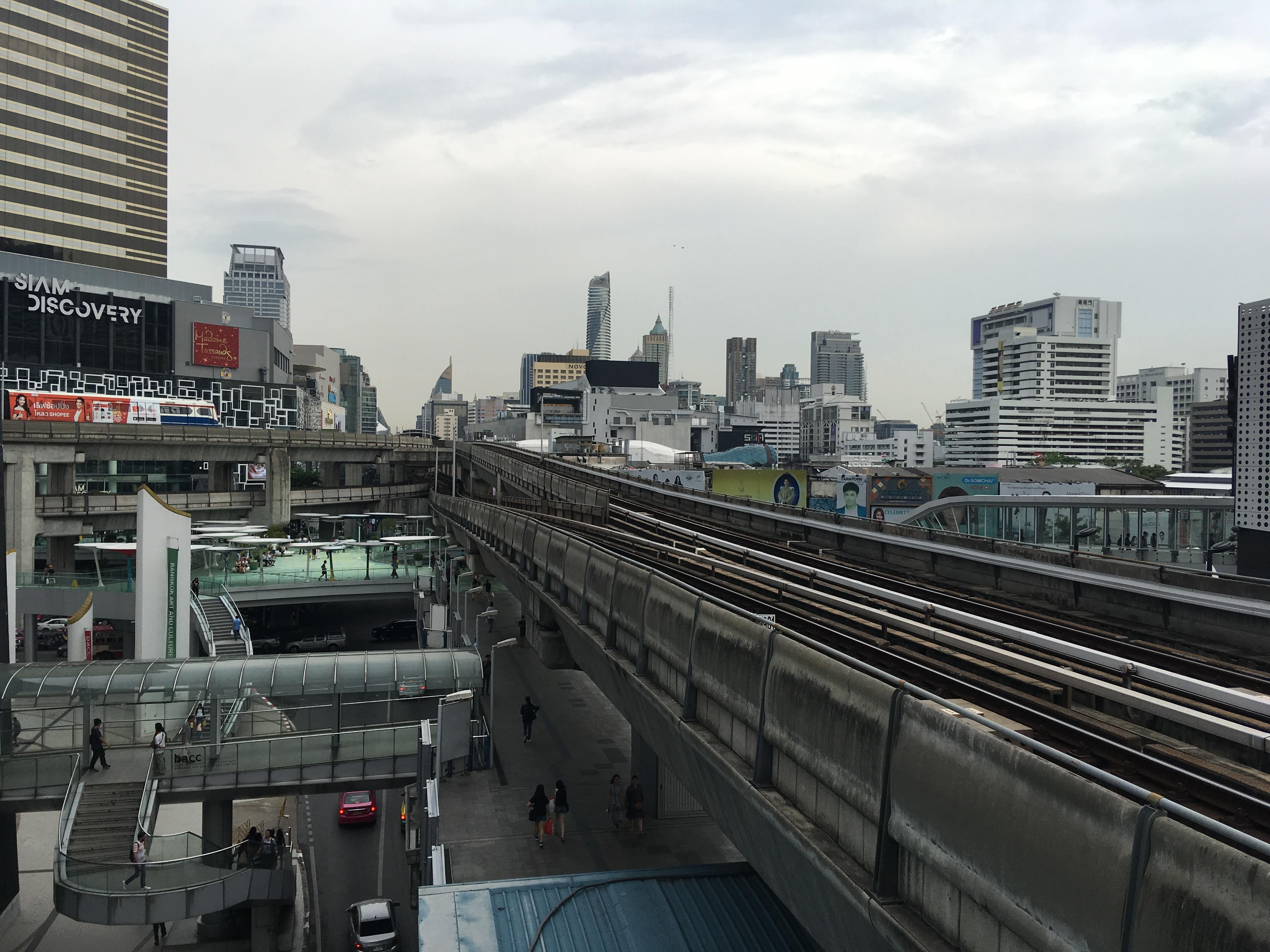
View of Pathumwan Skywalk from National Stadium station

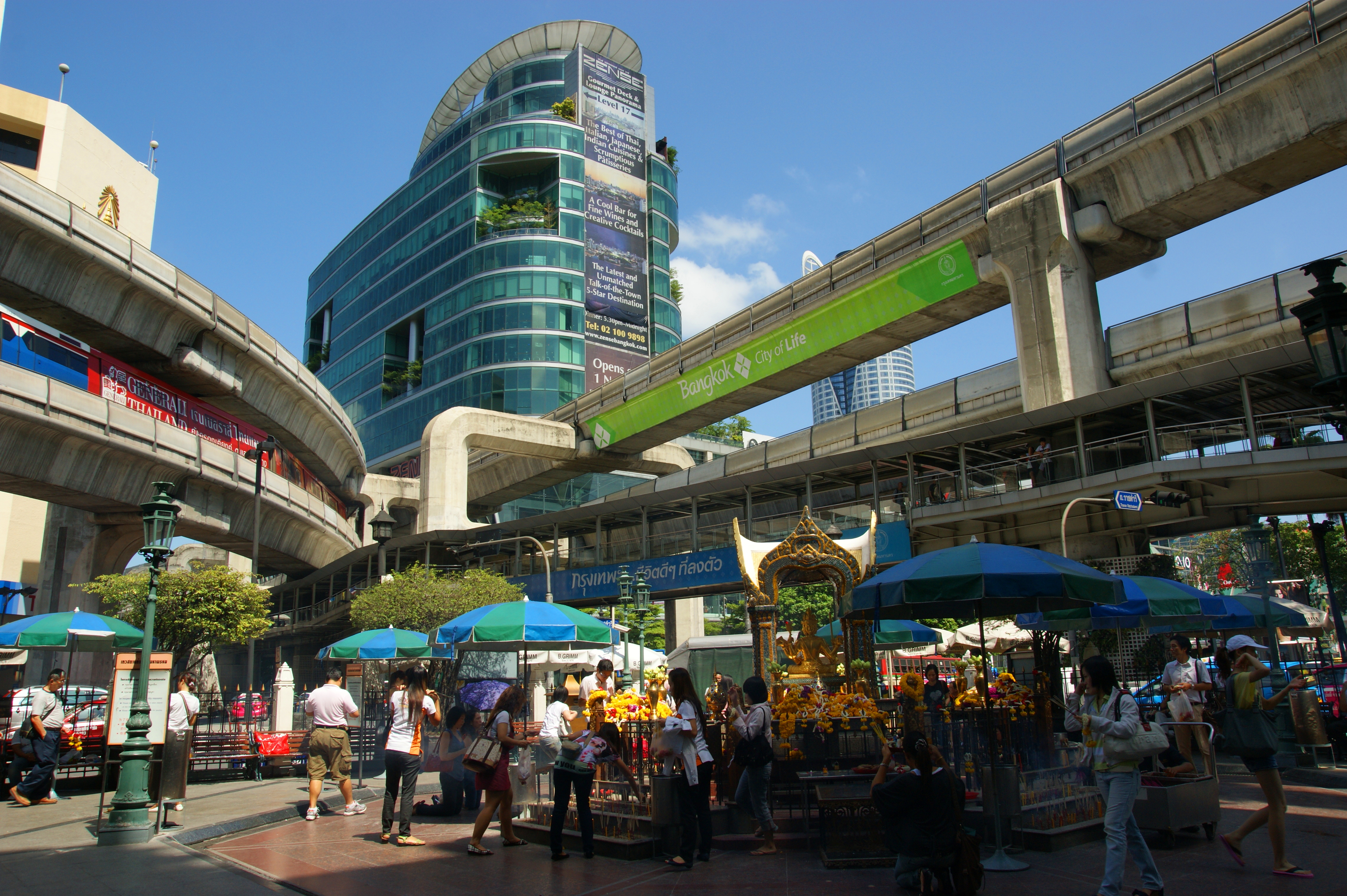
View of the viaducts of the Silom Line (left) and the Sukhumvit Line (right) from Erawan shrine

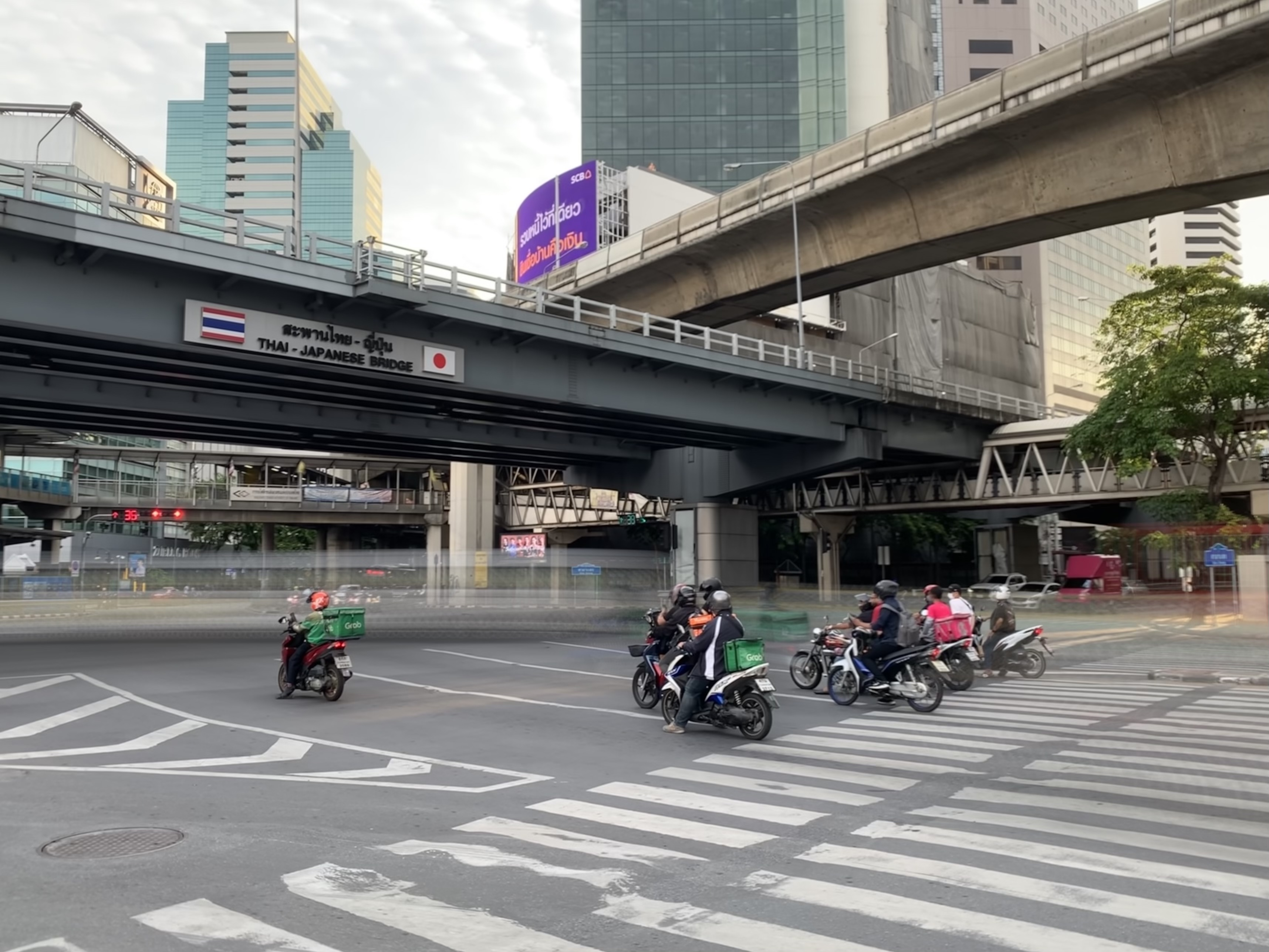
Sala Daeng junction with the viaduct of Silom Line and Thai-Japanese bridge

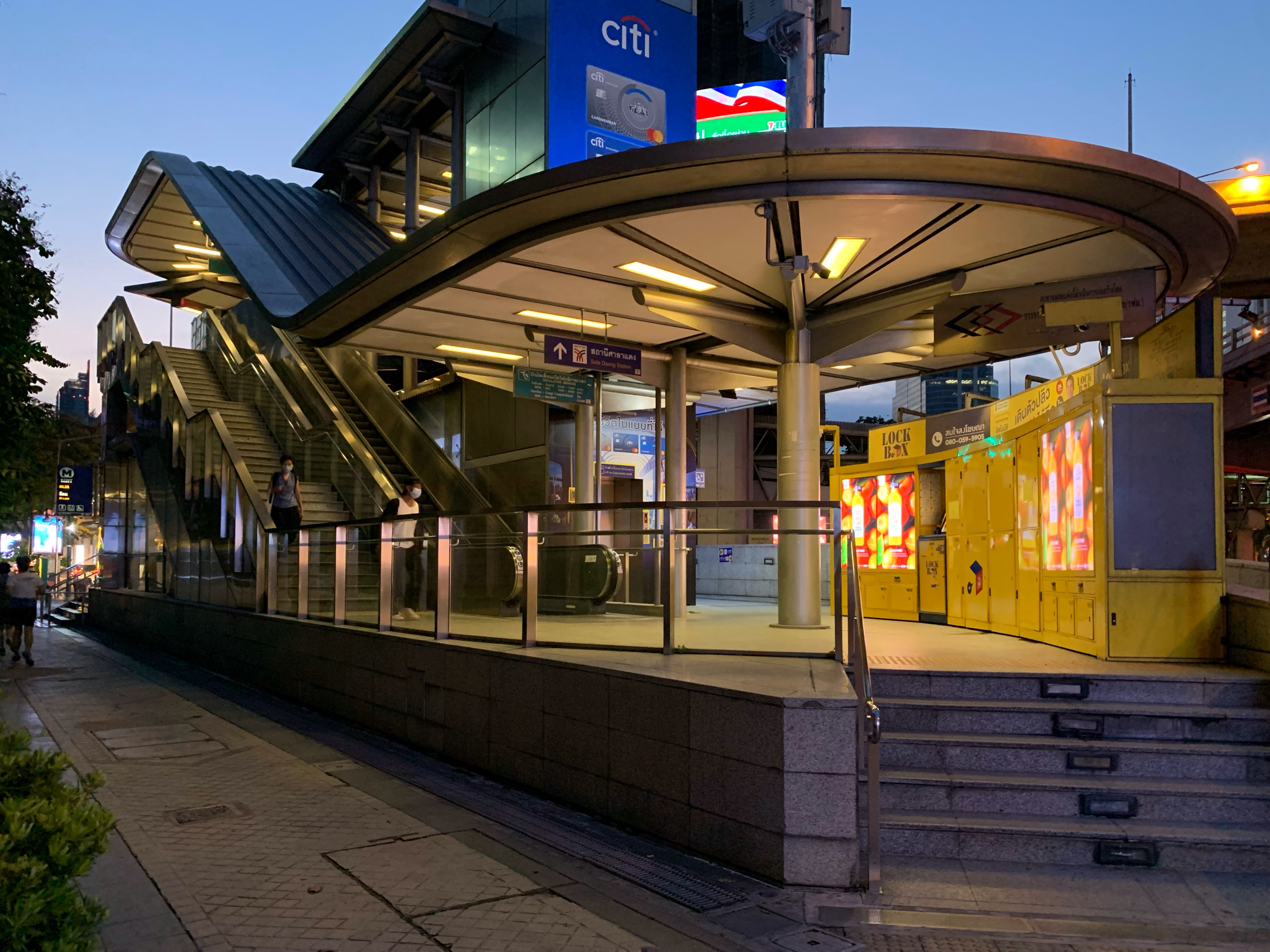
Linkage point between Silom Line and MRT Blue Line at Sala Daeng station

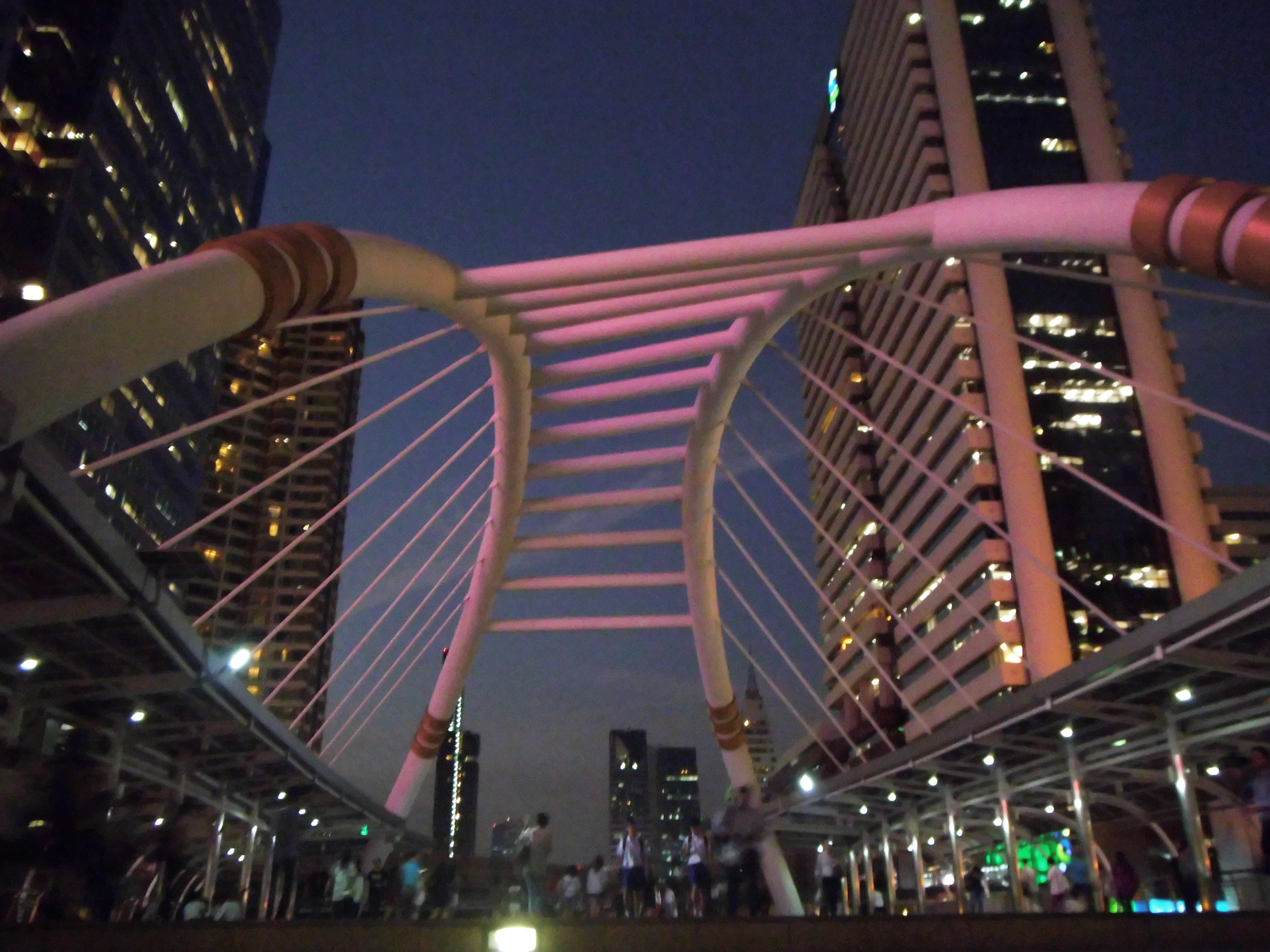
Chong Nonsi Skywalk, linkage point between Silom Line and BRT

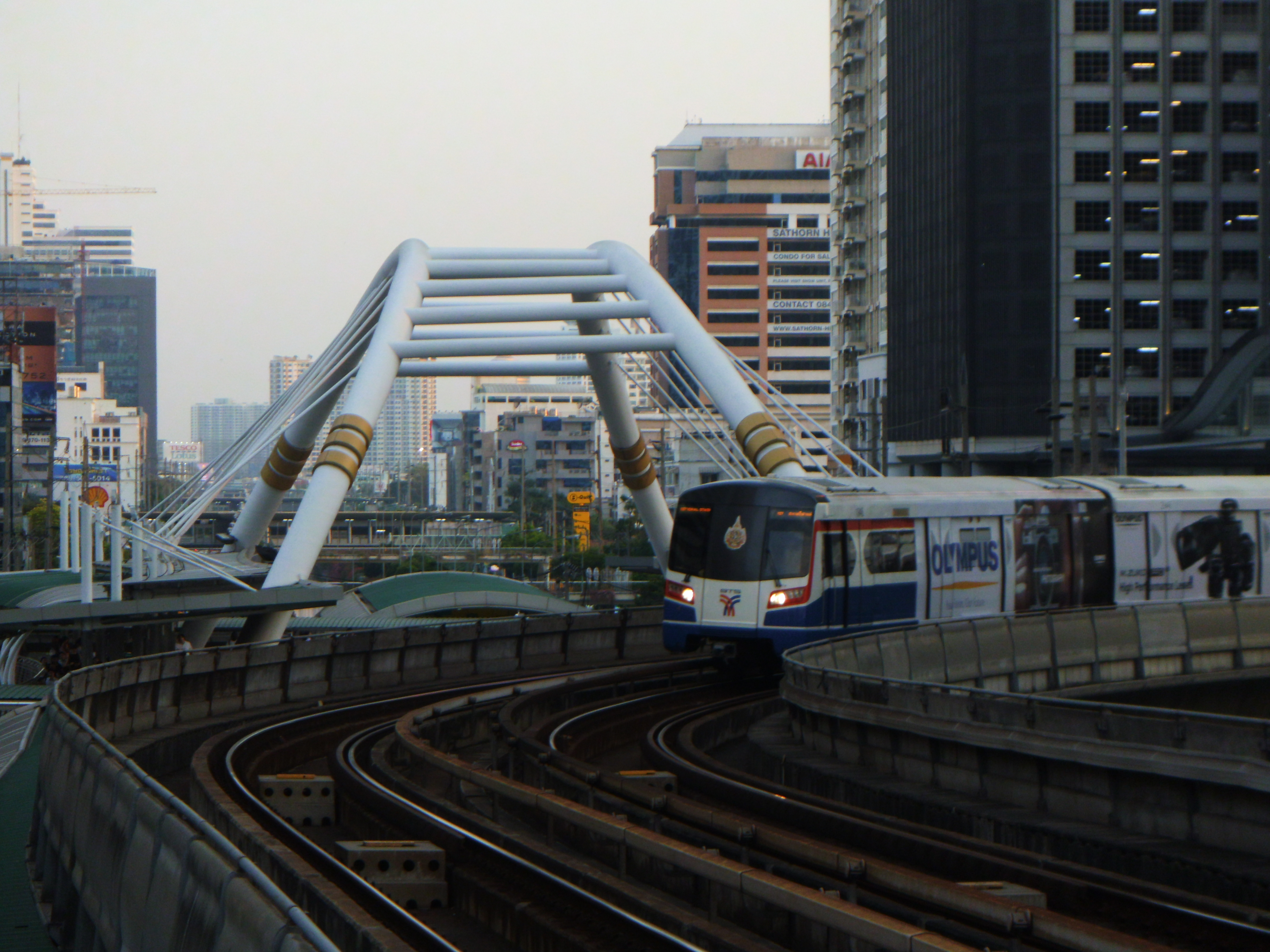
Sharp curve before Chong Nonsi station with Chong Nonsi Skywalk in the background

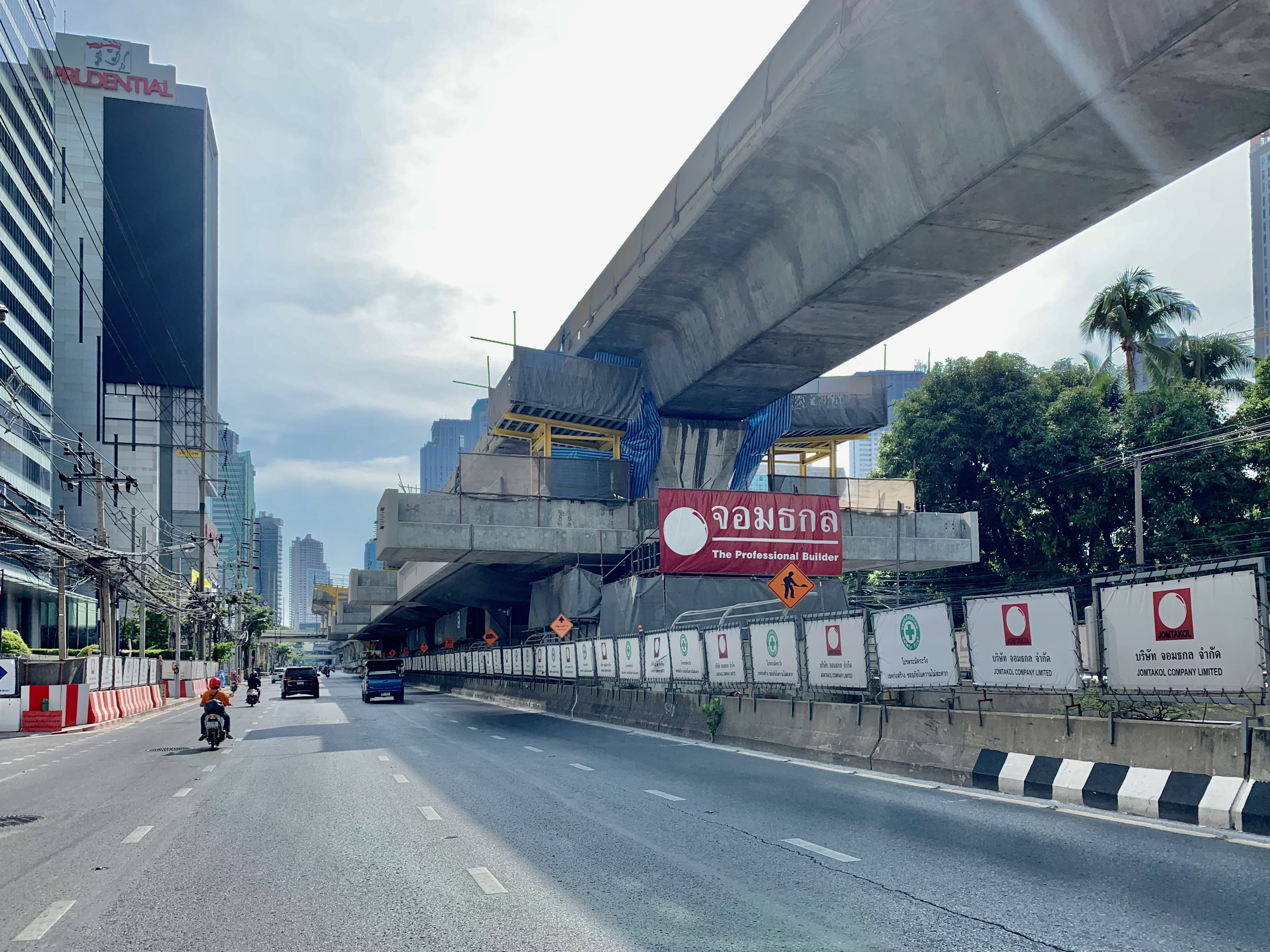
Construction of Saint Louis station (formerly known as Sueksa Witthaya station)

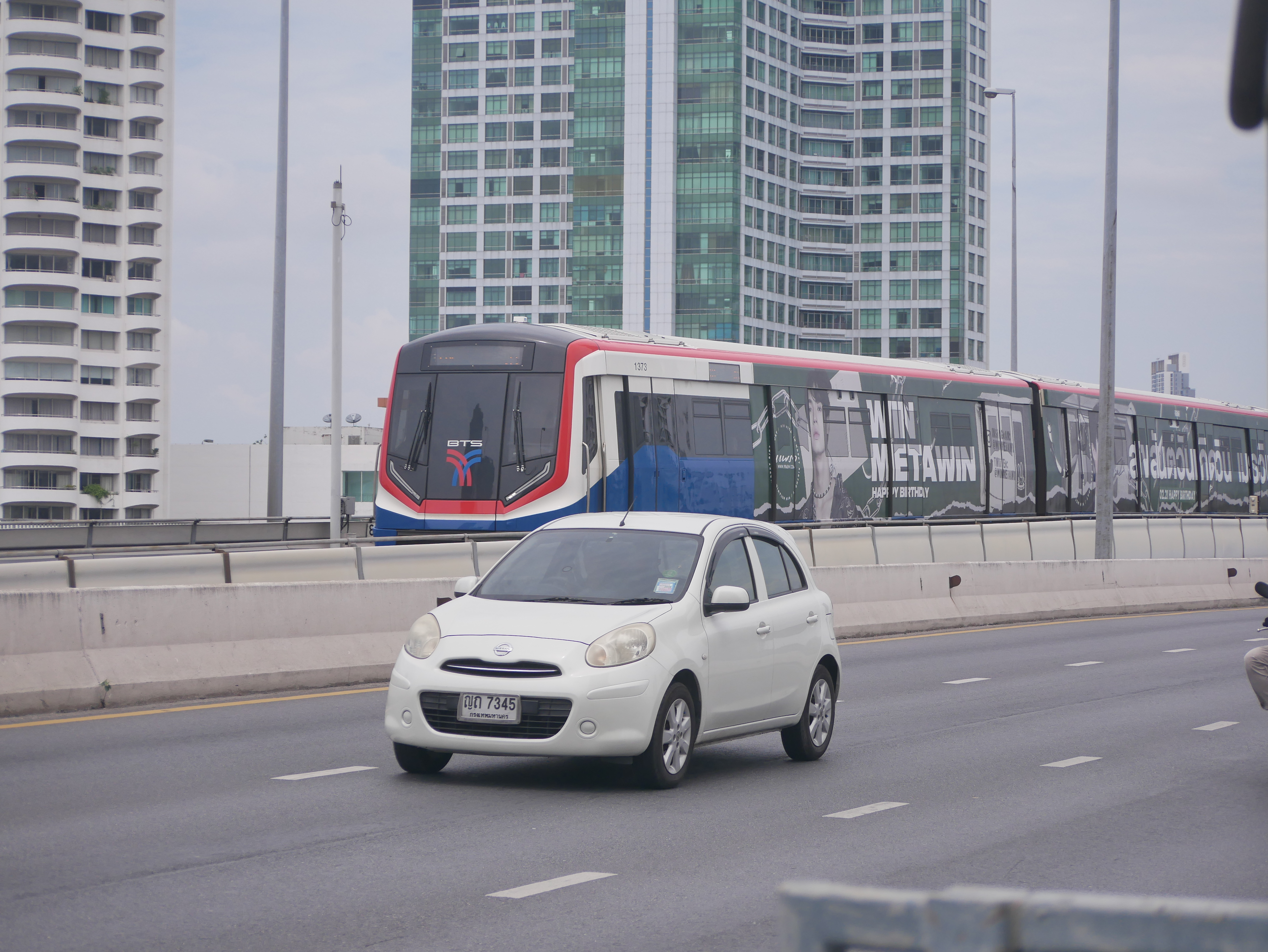
EMU-A2 outside of Saphan Taksin station

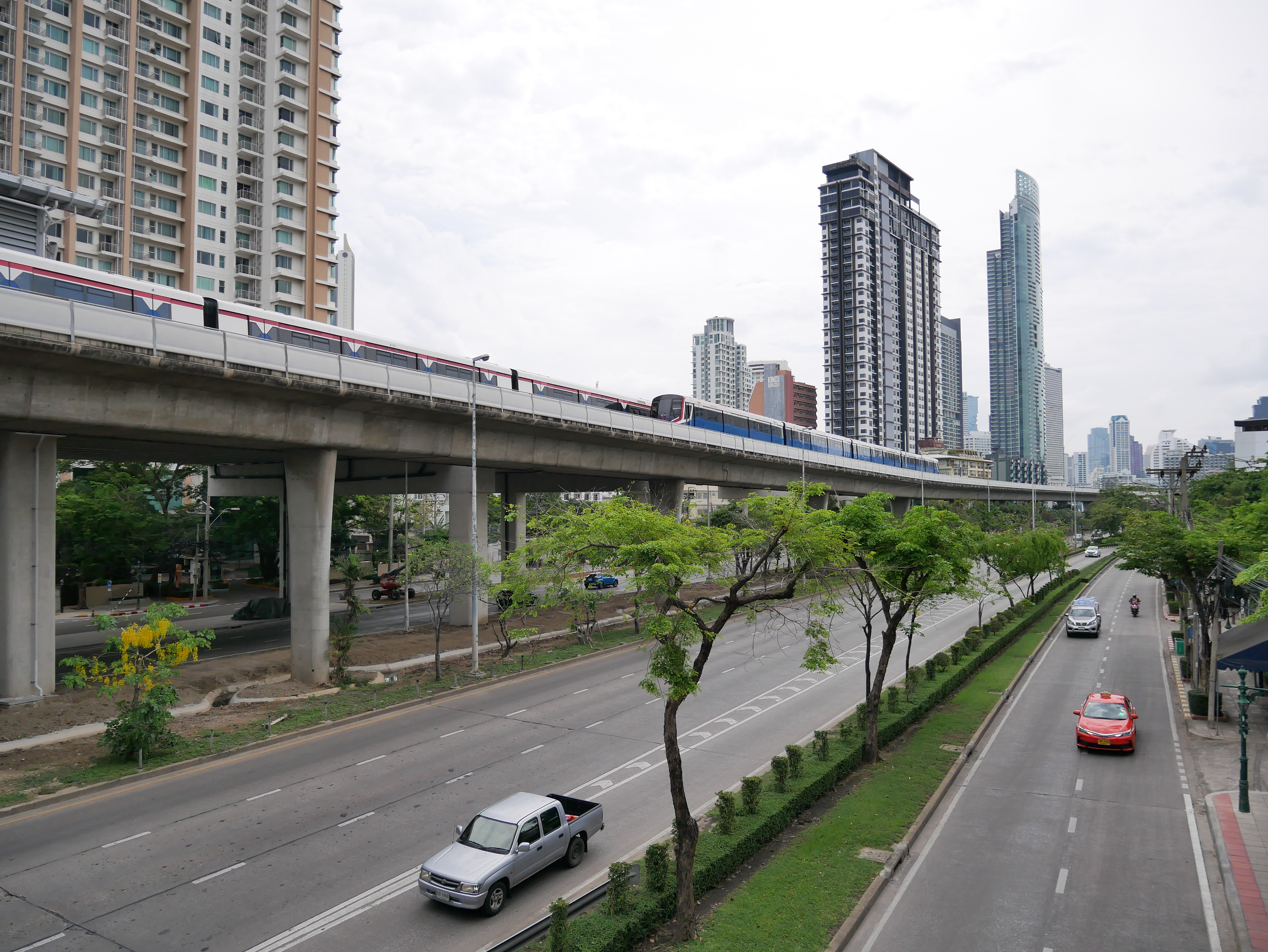
Outside of Krung Thon Buri station

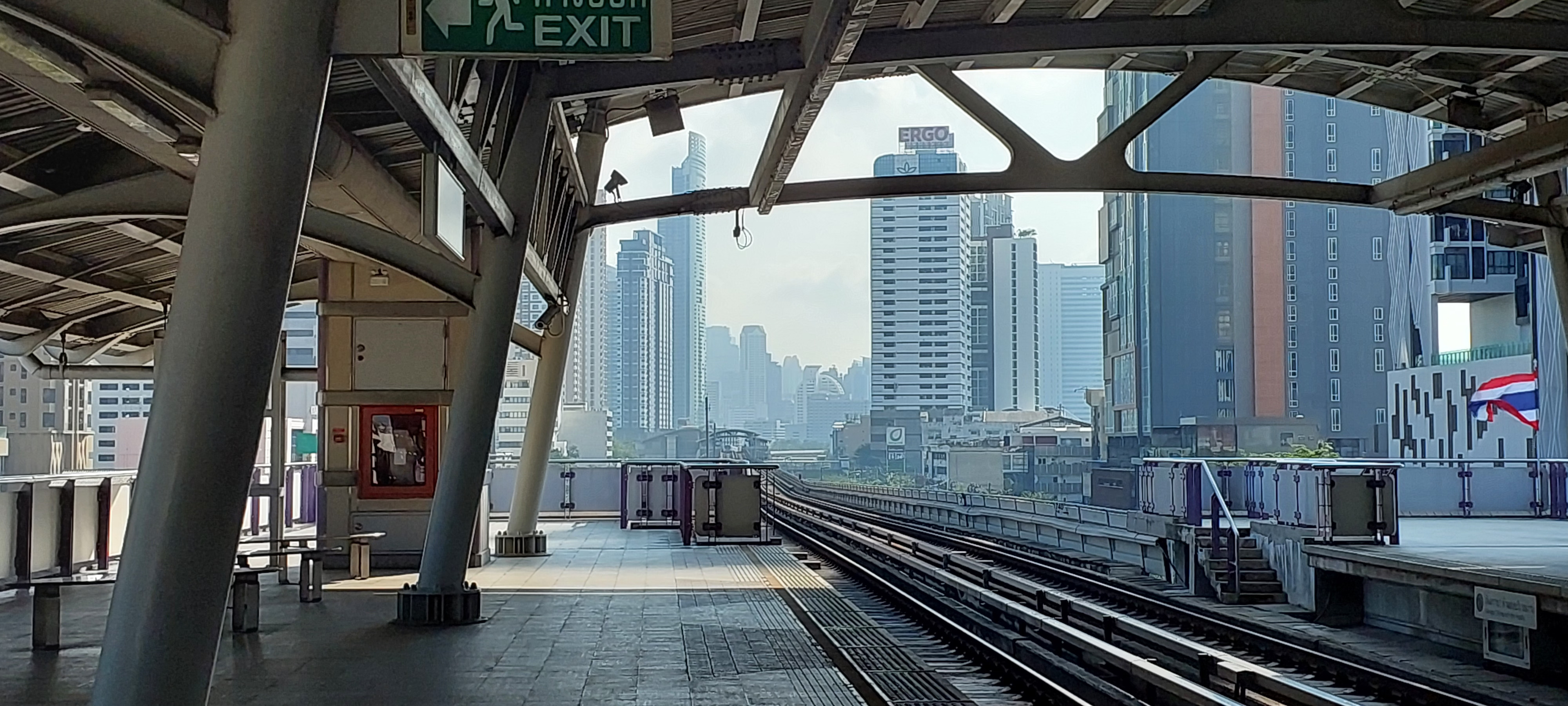
View of Sathorn Central Business District from Wongwian Yai station

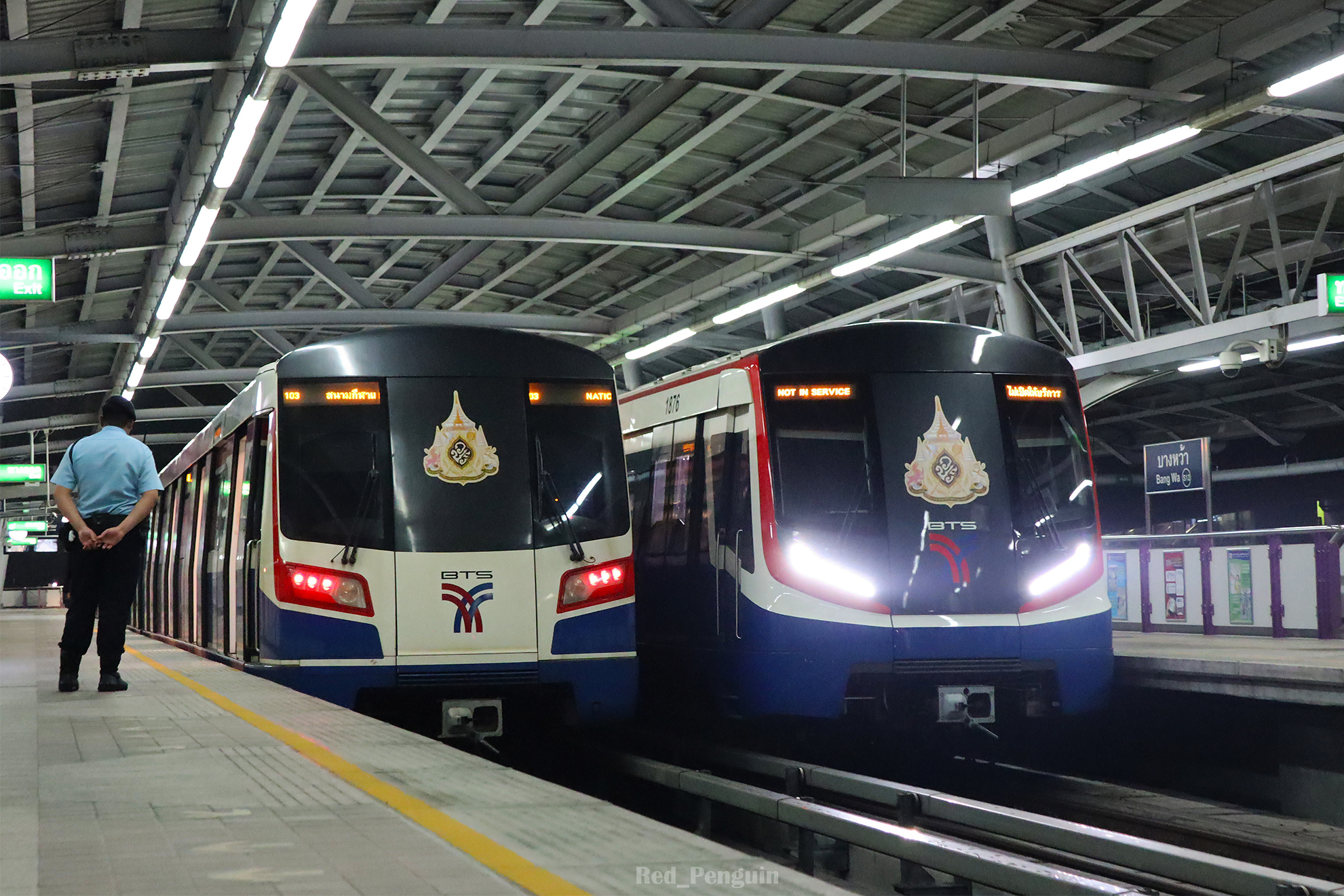
EMU-B1/B2 (left) and EMU-B3 (right) at Bang Wa station

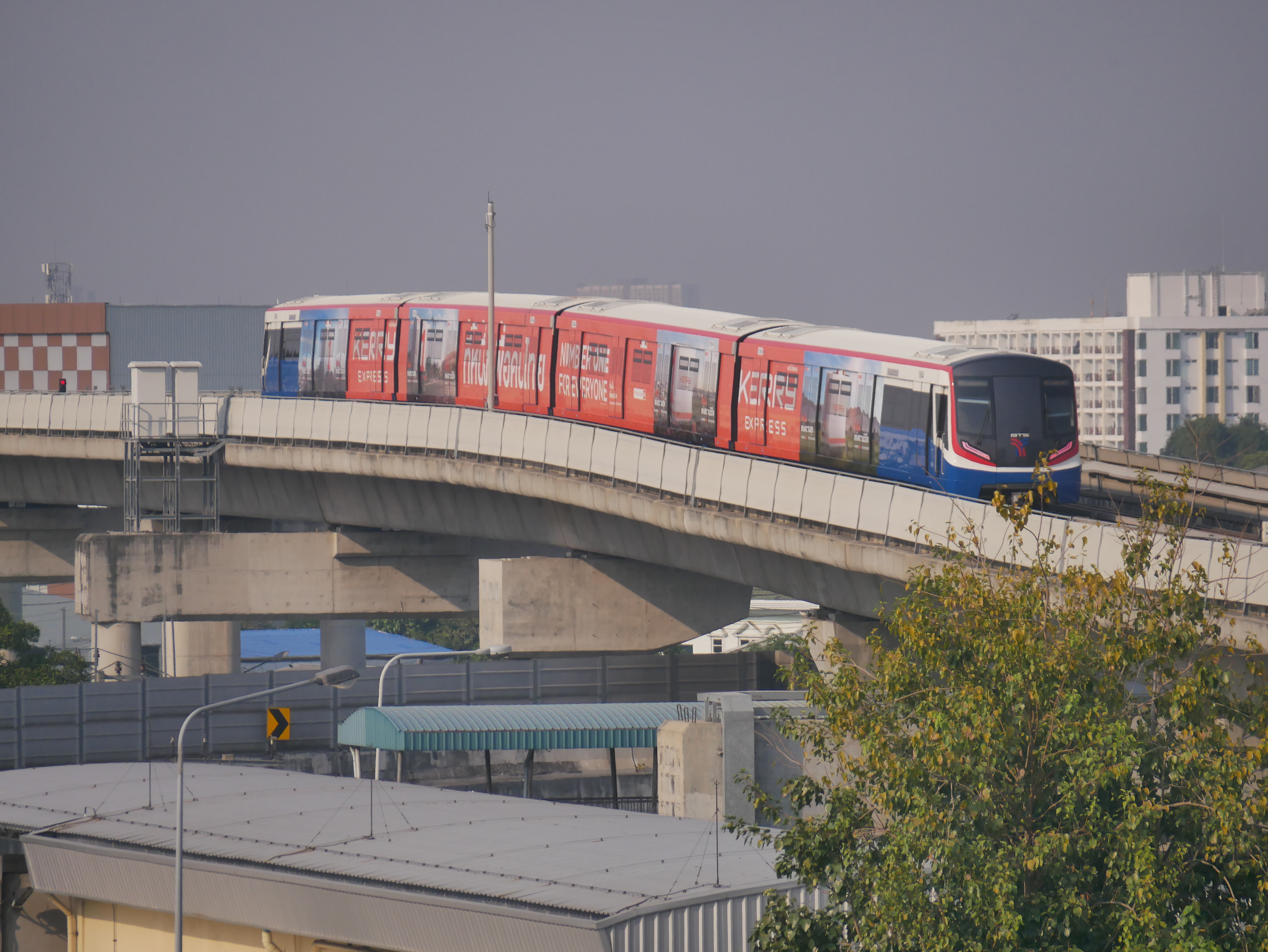
EMU-B3 turns around outside of Bang Wa station

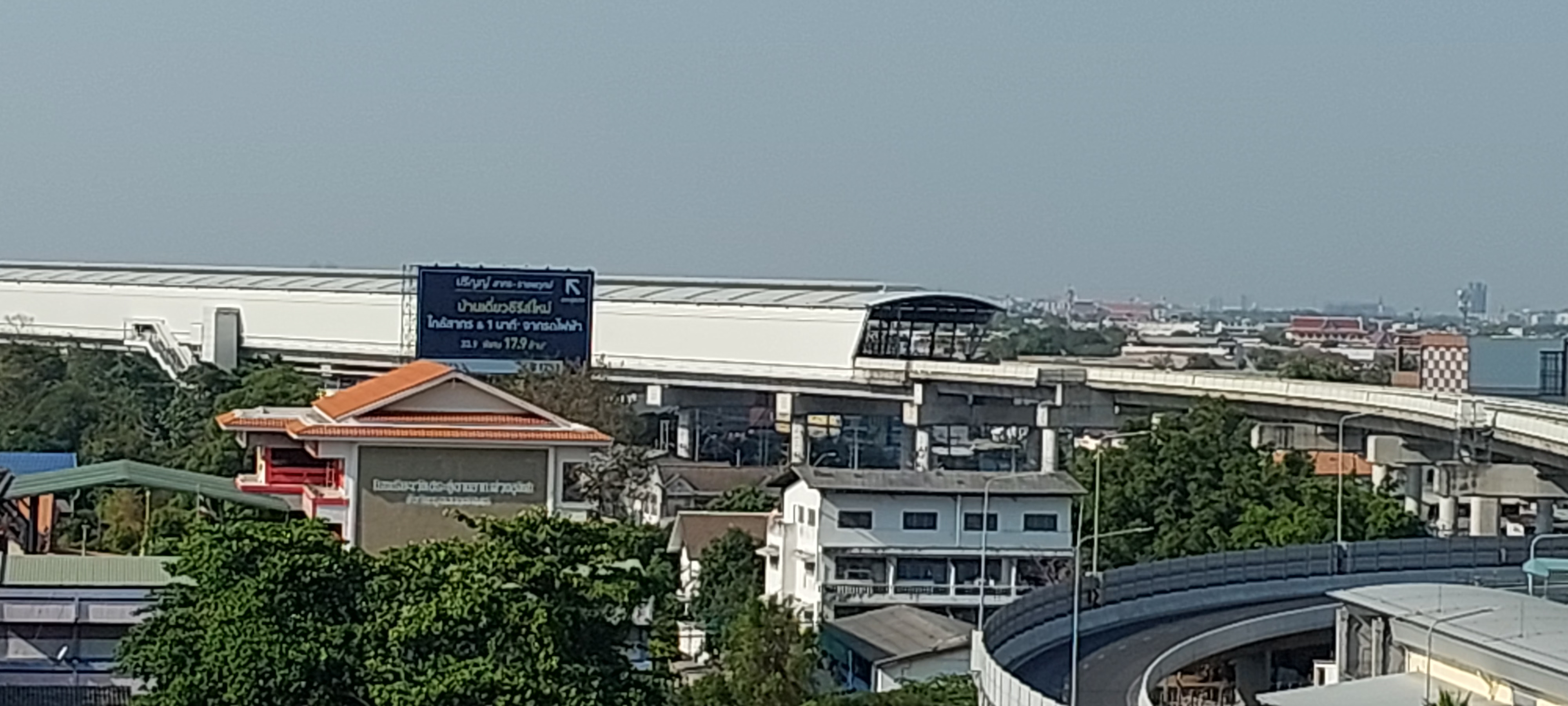
Bang Wa depot, the only depot on the Silom Line

== See also ==
- Mass Rapid Transit Master Plan in Bangkok Metropolitan Region
- BTS Skytrain
- Sukhumvit Line
- MRT (Bangkok)
- MRT Blue Line
- MRT Brown Line
- MRT Grey Line
- MRT Light Blue Line
- MRT Orange Line
- MRT Pink Line
- MRT Yellow Line
- Airport Rail Link (Bangkok)
- SRT Light Red Line
- SRT Dark Red Line
- Gold Line (Bangkok)
- Bangkok BRT
