= Saint Louis Church, Bangkok =

Church building in Thailand

Coordinates: 13°43′10″N 100°31′17″E

Saint Louis Church
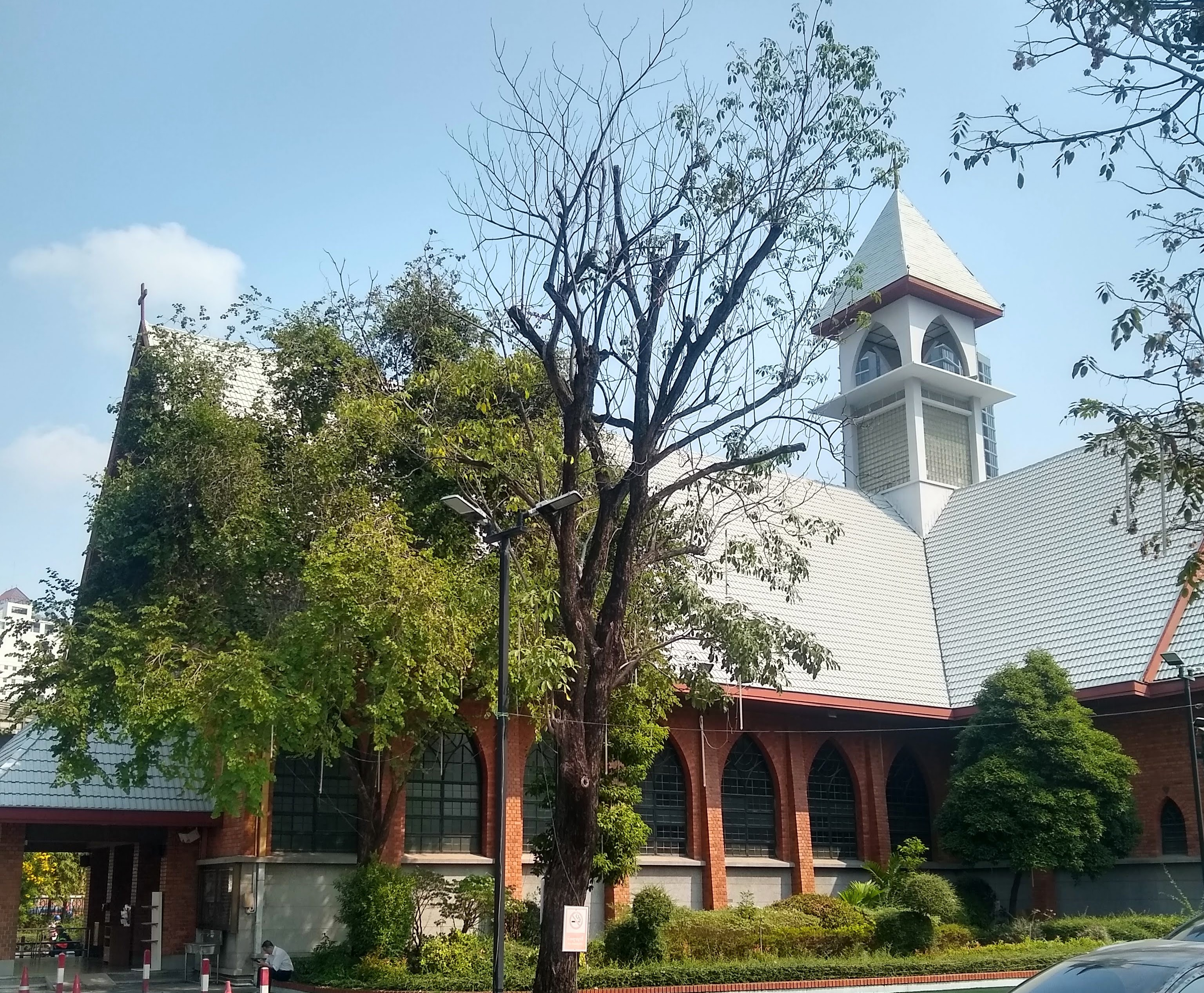
- Saint Louis Church
- Address: 23 Sathon Road, Yan Nawa subdistrict, Sathon district, Bangkok, Thailand
- Denomination: Roman Catholic
- Website: www.watsaintlouis.com

History
- Consecrated: 25 August 1957

Architecture
- Functional status: Active
- Architectural type: Contemporary Gothic
- Years built: 1956-57

Administration
- Archdiocese: Roman Catholic Archdiocese of Bangkok

Clergy
- Pastor: Fr Surasak Amphaphon

Saint Louis Church is a Roman Catholic church in Sathon district, Bangkok, Thailand. Named after Louis IX, also known as St Louis, the only French king to be canonised as a saint, it is part of the complex on Sathon Road which includes Saint Louis Hospital.

== History ==
Saint Louis Church is situated adjacent to Saint Louis Hospital on land purchased in Sathon district, Bangkok in 1895 by Bishop Jean-Louis Vey, Vicar Apostolic of Eastern Siam. Vey founded the hospital in 1898 but his plan to also build a church on the site did not proceed.

In November 1955, when Bishop Louis Chorin was serving as Apostolic Vicar of Bangkok, the intention to build a church was announced. In August 1956, a ceremony was held to bless the site after fund raising by the Christian community, and construction was completed during the following year, and the church was consecrated on 25 August 1957. Chorin appointed Fr Michael Langer, who had experience working in China, as its first pastor.

== Description ==
Built in the Gothic and contemporary style, the nave has an arched vaulted ceiling and walls of red brick with stucco carvings representing the Stations of the Cross. Next to the altar of Italian marble is a statue of St Louis.
