= Jean-Louis Vey =

French Catholic missionary and bishop (1840-1909)

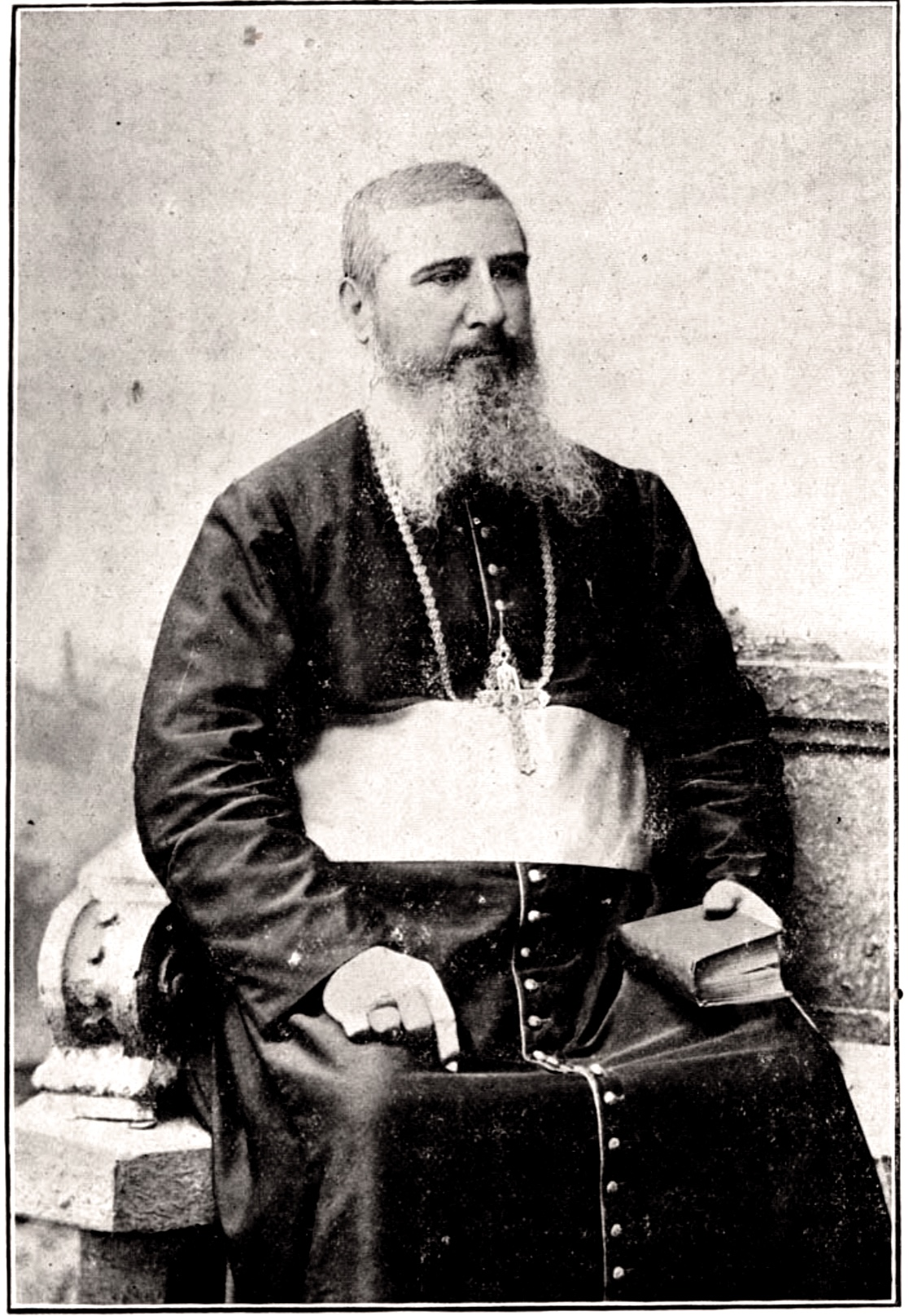
- Church: Roman Catholic
- Diocese: Vicar Apostolic of Eastern Siam
- Appointed: 30 July 1875
- Installed: 5 December 1875
- Term ended: 21 February 1909
- Predecessor: Ferdinand-Aimé-Augustin-Joseph Dupond, M.E.P.
- Successor: René-Marie-Joseph Perros, M.E.P.

Orders
- Ordination: 10 June 1865
- Consecration: 5 December 1875

Personal details
- Born: 16 January 1840 Araules, France
- Died: 21 February 1909 (aged 69) Bangkok
- Buried: Assumption Cathedral, Bangkok
- Denomination: Roman Catholic

Jean-Louis Vey MEP (16 January 1840 – 21 February 1909) was a French Catholic missionary, priest and bishop who served as Vicar Apostolic of Eastern Siam from 1875 to 1909.

== Early life ==
Vey was born on 16 January 1840 in Araules, France. He joined the Paris Foreign Missions Society where he was ordained as a priest on 10 June 1865.

== Career ==
On 14 July 1865, Vey departed for the mission of Siam (now Thailand) which had twenty European missionaries and ministered to 10,000 Christians. In July 1875, he was appointed Vicar Apostolic of Eastern Siam, and nominated Titular Bishop of Gerasa. In December of that year, he was ordained as Titular Bishop of Gerasa in the church of St Francois Xavier in Bangkok.

Under Vey, the mission in Siam entered a period of rapid expansion. His most notable success was his evangelisation carried out in Laos. Most of the mission's activities were in the central, east and west areas of the country with little activity in the northern region, so Vey sent two missionaries to the area and they opened a northern mission on 2 January 1881. However, his plans for the evangelisation of Northwest Siam, near the border with Burma, were not realised due to lack of resources and personnel.

In 1898, Vey founded the St Louis Hospital in Bangkok and entrusted the management to the Sisters of St Paul de Chartres who came to Bangkok the same year. In 1901, he invited the Brothers of St Gabriel to manage the first modern Catholic school in Bangkok, the Bangkok Assumption College.

Vey died on 21 February 1909, aged 69, and was buried in the vault of the Assumption Cathedral, Bangkok.
