= National Stadium BTS station =

Skytrain station in Bangkok, Thailand

National Stadium สนามกีฬาแห่งชาติ
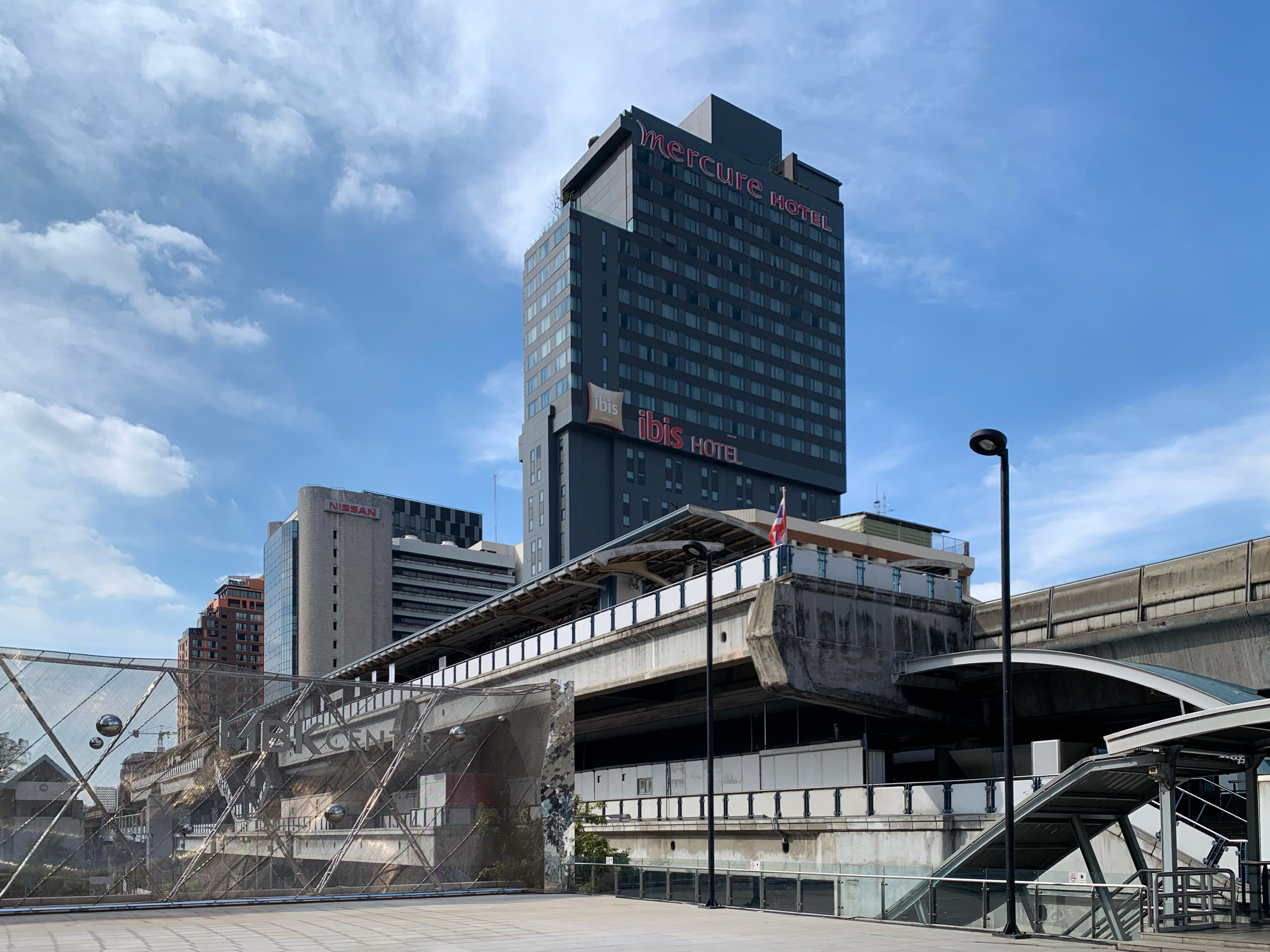
- The station as seen from MBK Center

General information
- Location: Pathum Wan; Bangkok; Thailand
- Coordinates: 13°44′47.45″N 100°31′44.79″E
- Owner: Bangkok Metropolitan Administration (BMA); BTS Rail Mass Transit Growth Infrastructure Fund (BTSGIF)
- Operator: Bangkok Mass Transit System; Public Company Limited (BTSC)
- Line: Silom Line
- Platforms: 2
- Tracks: 2
- Connections: Khlong Saen Saep boat service; BMTA Buses

Construction
- Structure type: Elevated

Other information
- Station code: W1

History
- Opened: 5 December 1999; 26 years ago
- Electrified: Third rail 750 V DC

Passengers
- 2021: 1,298,001

Services
Preceding station	BTS Skytrain	Following station
Terminus	Silom Line	Siam towards Bang Wa
Location

National Stadium Station sign

National Stadium station (Thai: สถานีสนามกีฬาแห่งชาติ; RTGS: Sathani Sanam Kila Haeng Chat) is a BTS Skytrain station on the Silom Line in Pathum Wan District, Bangkok, Thailand.

== Nearby landmarks ==
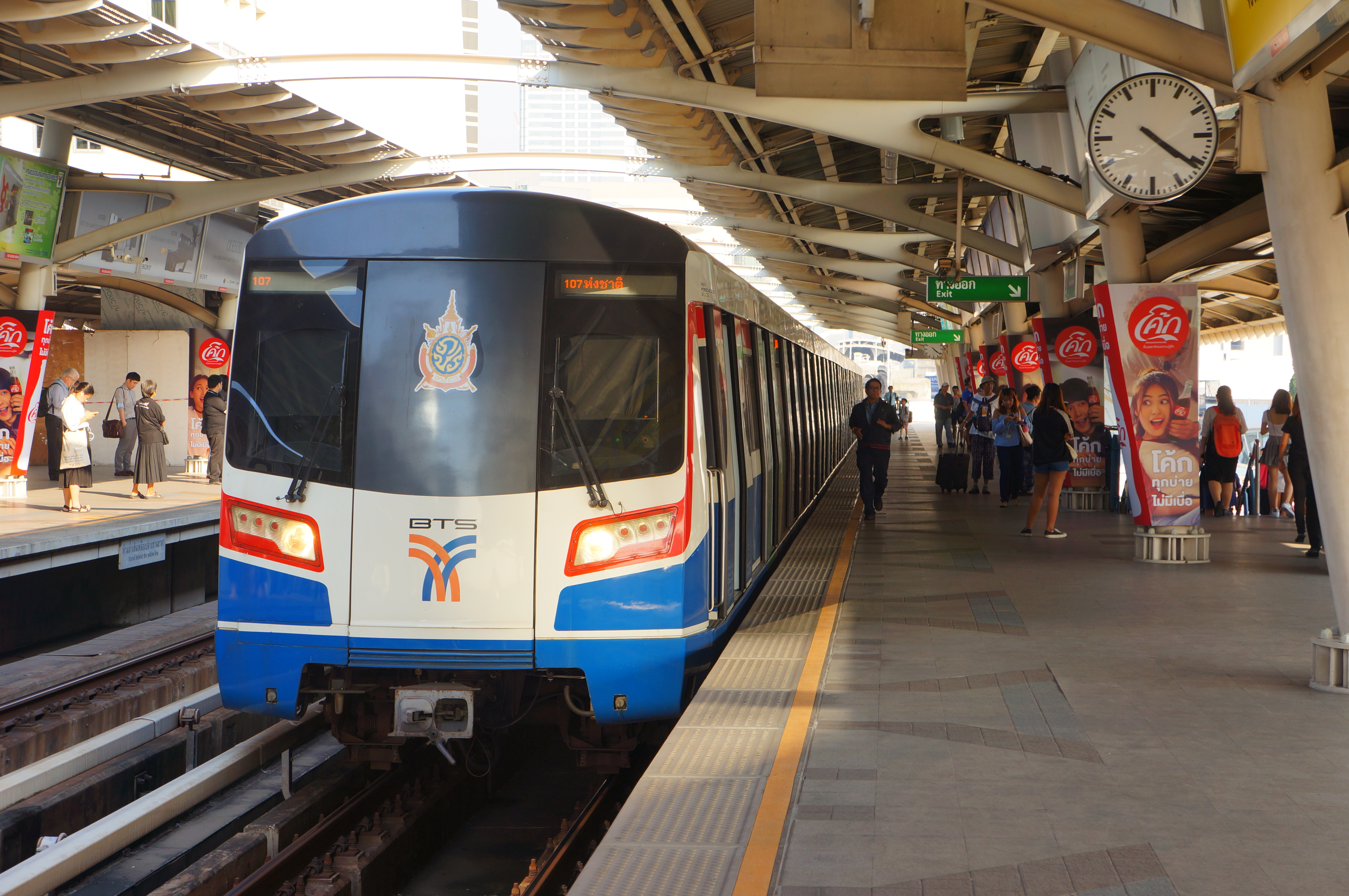
National Stadium Station in 2017

The station is located on Rama I Road to the west of Pathum Wan intersection, where the National Stadium, MBK Center, Siam Discovery Center, Bangkok Art and Culture Centre and Siam Square are situated and all linked to the station by skybridge. It is also within walking distance of Siam Center and Siam Paragon, which are located at Siam station. Jim Thompson House, a popular Thai silk museum of Jim Thompson, is just opposite the station in Soi Kasemsan 2.

To the west of the station, which is still a terminus, passengers can take the buses or taxis for a short distance to the historical area of Bangkok, where notable attractions are located such as the Grand Palace, Sanam Luang, Wat Pho, the Democracy Monument, Ratchadamnoen Avenue, Giant Swing, Golden Mount and Khaosan Road

== Facilities ==
- Khlong Saen Saep Express Boat service at Saphan Hua Chang (or Ratchathewi) Pier (southern side of Hua Chang bridge) to Pratunam market and Golden Mount

== Station layout ==
U3; Platform	Side platform, doors will open on the left
U3; Platform	Platform 3	Silom Line toward Bang Wa (Siam)
U3; Platform	Platform 4	Silom Line termination platform
U3; Platform	Side platform, doors will open on the left
U2 ticket sales class	ticket sales floor	Exit 1-4, Passenger Service Center; Ticket offices, ticket machines, shops, MBK Center and Don Don Donki; Bangkok Art and Culture Centre, Siam Discovery
G street level	-	Bus stop, National Stadium (Supachalasai Stadium); Pathumwan Institute of Technology, Jim Thompson House; Faculty of Sports Science, Faculty of Psychology and Graduate School, Chulalongkorn University

== Bus connections ==
BMTA

- 11: Prawet – National Stadium
- 11: Mega Bangna – National Stadium
- 15: Kanlapapruek – Bang Lamphu
- 47: Khlong Toei Pier – Department of Lands (Pak Khlong Talat)
- 73: Siam Park – Phra Phuttha Yodfa Bridge
- 93: Athlete's Village – Si Phraya Pier
- 204: Bangkok City Hall (Din Daeng) – Ratchawong Pier
- 508: Paknam (Crocodile Farm) – Ratchaworadit Pier

Smart Bus

- 48: Ramkhamhaeng University Bangna Campus - Wat Pho
- 113: Minburi - Bangkok Railway Station

== Exits ==
- Exit 1: Soi Kasemsan 2, Jim Thompson House Museum, Pathumwan Institute of Technology, Tesco Lotus Rama 1, Bus Stop to Siam (escalator)
- Exit 2: Sala Wachirawut National Stadium, Charoen Phon Intersection, Bus Stop to Yotse (Elevator)
- Exit 3: Bangkok Art and Culture Center (bridge)
- Exit 4: 2nd floor, MBK Center (bridge)
- Exit 5: Wan Siam Bridge connecting Pathumwan Intersection
  - MBK Center 2nd and 3rd Floor (Link Bridge)
  - Bangkok Art and Culture Center, Anti-Money Laundering Office, Hua Chang Bridge and Saphan Hua Chang Pier
  - Siam Square Soi Klang - Soi 2
  - Siam Discovery, M floor and 1 (connection bridge)
  - The meeting point is at Exit 2, in front of the study of Commerce.
