= Saint Louis Hospital (Bangkok) =

Coordinates: 13.719387°N 100.525207°E

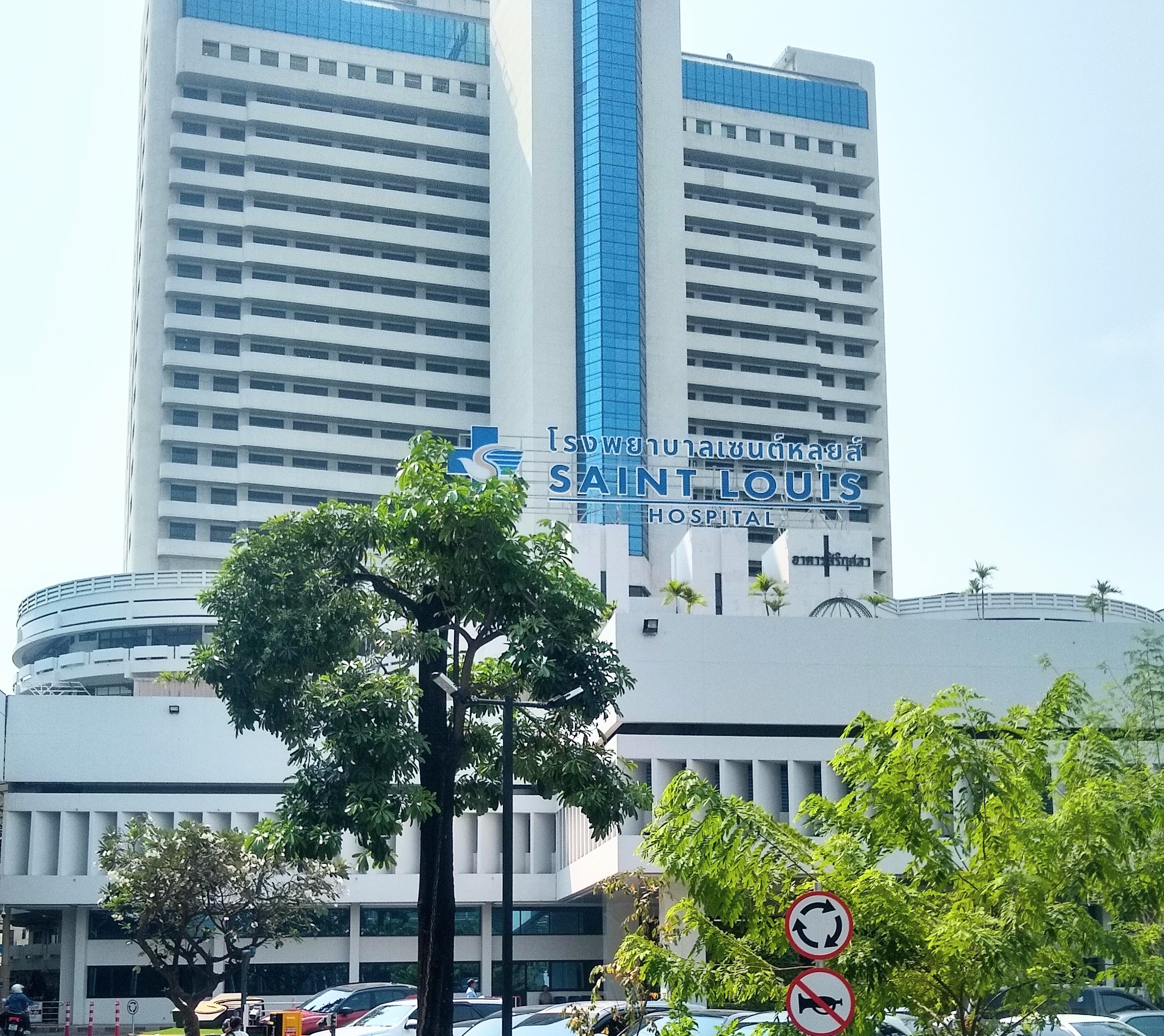

Geography
- Location: 27 Sathon Tai Road, Yannawa Sub-district, Sathon District, Bangkok, Thailand

Organisation
- Type: Private
- Religious affiliation: Catholic

Services
- Standards: ISO9002, ISO 14001
- Beds: 412

History
- Construction started: 1898
- Opened: September 15, 1895; 130 years ago

Links
- Website: โรงพยาบาลเซนต์หลุยส์
- Lists: Hospitals in Thailand

Saint Louis Hospital (Thai: โรงพยาบาลเซนต์หลุยส์) is a large private Catholic hospital in Sathon District, Bangkok, Thailand. Named for Saint Louis; the King of France, the hospital was founded by Bishop Vey in 1898 following the adjacent Saint Louis Church, making it the first Catholic hospital in Thailand. The hospital's motto is "Ubi Caritas, Ibi Deus Est." (God resides in mercy.)

Saint Louis Hospital has been the prominent healthcare facility of Catholics in Thailand. The hospital has been visited by two Popes during both of the country's only papal visits; in 1984 by Pope John Paul II, and in 2019 by Pope Francis.

== Services ==
Aside from the professional medical services certified with ISO9002 and ISO14001, Thailand's first healthcare facility to have ever reached either of the standards, the hospital also provides some services to sustain the motto and the main aim towards mercy.

=== Divine Mercy Centre ===
The Divine Mercy Centre (Thai: ศูนย์พระเมตตา; RTGS: sun phra metta) is the palliative care centre of the hospital for the patients with less than 6 months expectancy. Some of the services include the Death Talk, conducting mass, or other religious ceremonies up to the patient's wills.

=== John Paul II Charity Clinic ===
John Paul II Charity Clinic (Thai: คลินิกจิตกุศล ยอห์น ปอล) is the hospital's charity clinic which provides basic healthcare free-of-charge for patients in poverty, poor church-goers, and the hospital's staff members. The clinic was founded in order to commemorate the Papal visit to the hospital of Pope John Paul II in 1984.

=== Holy Spirit Chapel ===
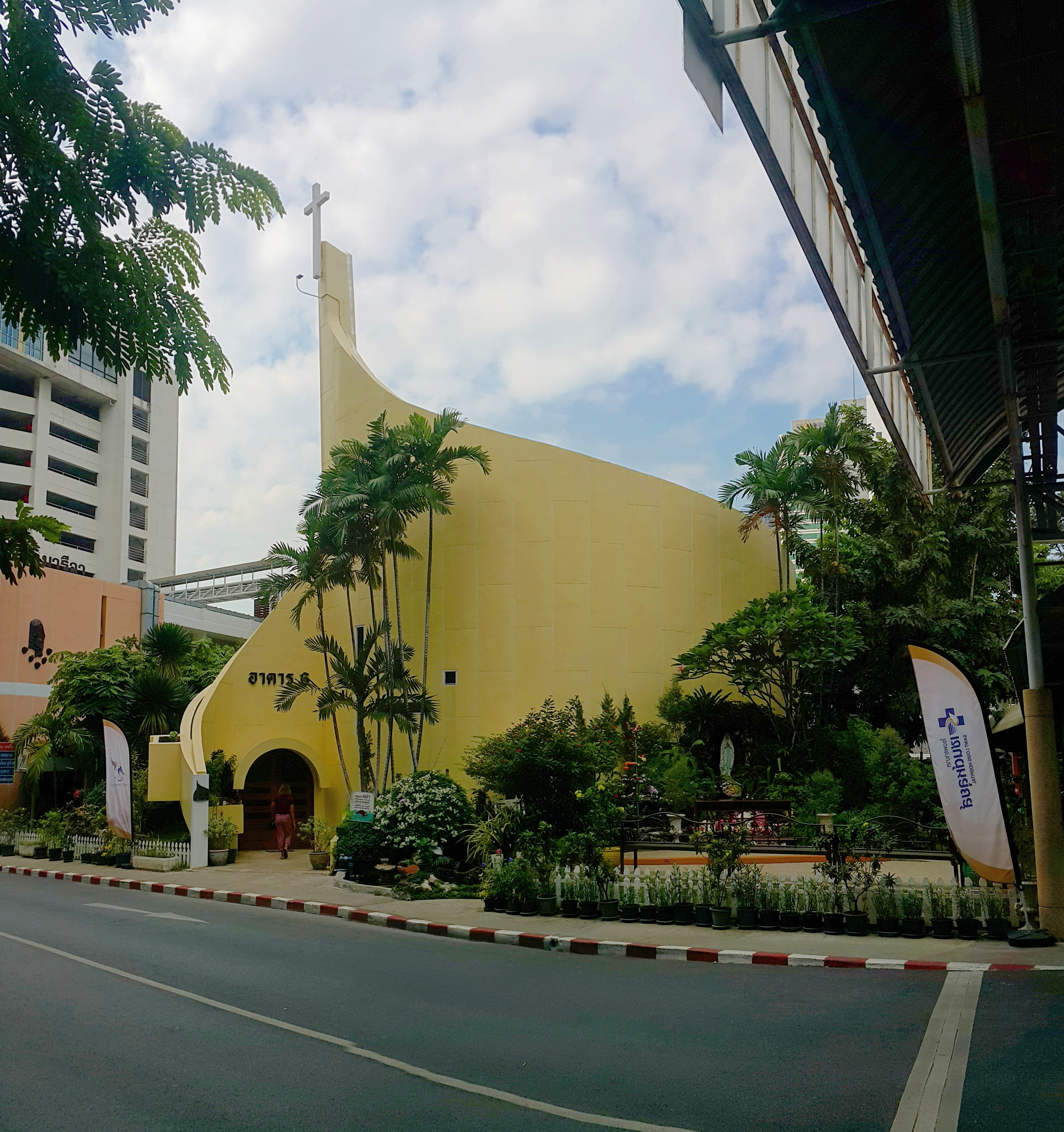
Holy Spirit Chapel

The Holy Spirit Chapel (Thai: วัดน้อยพระจิตเจ้า; RTGS: wat noi phra chit chao; German: Kapelle St. Louis Hospital) is the chapel of the hospital. Founded in 1982, the chapel is now occupied by Deutschsprachige Kath: Gemeinde St. Marien in Bangkok, Thailand. It is the only place in Thailand to carry mass in German.
