= Samut Sakhon =

City in Thailand

Samut Sakhon สมุทรสาคร
- City Municipality
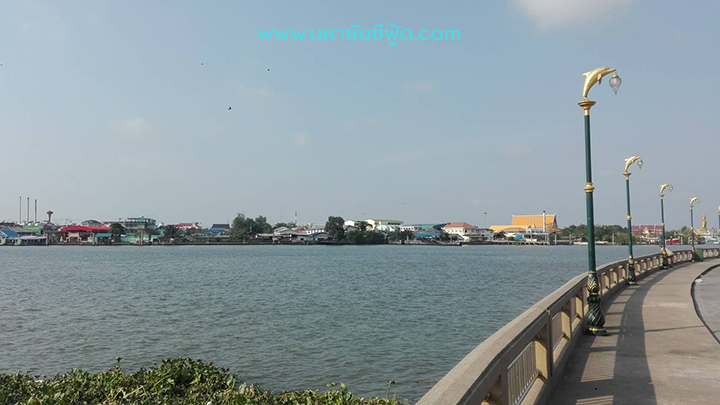
- Viewpoint of Samut Sakhon

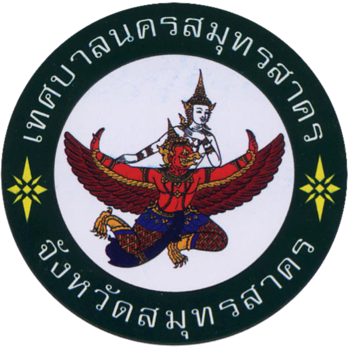
- Seal
- Nickname: Mahachai
- Location in Bangkok Metropolitan Region#Location in Thailand Samut Sakhon (Thailand)
- Coordinates: 13°32′55″N 100°16′39″E
- Country: Thailand
- Province: Samut Sakhon
- District: Mueang Samut Sakhon
- Samut Sakhon subd. municipality: 10 December 1935
- Samut Sakhon city municipality: 11 November 1999

Government
  - Type: City Municipality

Area
  - Total: 10.33 km^{2} (3.99 sq mi)

Population (2024)
  - Total: 53,221
  - Density: 312/km^{2} (810/sq mi)
- Time zone: UTC+7 (ICT)
- Postal code: 74000
- Calling code: 034
- ISO 3166 code: TH-74010100
- Local Admin. Org.: code
- Samut Sakhon city municipality: 03740102
- Website: sakhoncity.go.th
- Also TH-74010200 and TH-74010300

Samut Sakhon (Thai: สมุทรสาคร, pronounced [samùt sǎːkʰɔːn]) is a city in Thailand; it is the capital of Samut Sakhon province. It is also part of the Bangkok Metropolitan Region.

== Toponymy ==
Samut Sakhon was formerly called Tha Chin (Chinese Pier) probably because, in the old days, it had been a trading port for a vast number of Chinese junks. In 1548, a city named Sakhon Buri was established at the mouth of the Tha Chin River. A center for recruiting troops from various seaside towns. The name of the city was changed to Mahachai when Khlong (canal) Mahachai was dug in 1704 to connect the Tha Chin River to the city. Later, the city was renamed Samut Sakhon by King Rama IV but it is still popularly called Mahachai by its residents.

== Geography ==
The general topography of the city is a coastal lowland about 1 meter above sea level. There are no islands, mountains or minerals. The Tha Chin River and Mahachai Canal flow into the Gulf of Thailand at Bang Ya Phraek subdistrict. The general condition is an urban community with houses, industrial plants and a dense population.
Neighboring subdistricts are (from the north clockwise): Tha Sai, Khok Kham, Bang Ya Phraek and Tha Chin of Mueang Samut Sakhon district of Samut Sakhon province.

== Administration ==
=== Provincial government ===
The combined administration of Mahachai, Tha Chalom and Krokkrak subdistricts (tambons) is responsible for an area that covers 10.33 square kilometres (3.99 sq mi), as of December 2024: 53,221 people and 19,235 households.

| No. | Subdistricts | Thai | Communitues | Population |
|---|---|---|---|---|
| 1. | Mahachai | มหาชัย | 23 | 40,986 |
| 2. | Tha Chalom | ท่าฉลอม | 6 | 7,570 |
| 3. | Krokkrak | โกรกกราก | 3 | 4,665 |
| | | Total | 32 | 53,221 |

Samut Sakhon city municipality

=== Local government ===
As of December 2024 there is ฺSamut Sakhon city municipality (thesaban nakhon) which covers the combined area of Mahachai, Tha Chalom and Krokkrak subdistricts. There are 32 communities (chumchon), although not directly chosen by the local citizens, which provides advice and recommendations to the local administrative organization.

== Education ==
There are the following schools:

- Mahachai municipal school - Mahachai
- Wat Chettharam municipal school - Mahachai
- Wat Chong Lom municipal school - Mahachai
- Wat Tuk Maha Chayaram municipal school - Mahachai
- Wat Suwannaram municipal school - Tha Chalom
- Wat Krokkrak municipal school - Krokkrak

== Healthcare ==
There is no health promoting hospital in Samut Sakhon city. But there are in Mahachai subdistrict: Samut Sakhon Hospital with 600 beds, Ekachai Hospital with 142 beds, Mahachai 3 Hospital with 180 beds, Jesada Vechakarn Hospital with 10 beds and in Tha Chalom subdistricht: Metropolitan Hospital Tha Chalom

== Temples ==
The following active temples, where Theravada Buddhism is practised by local residents:

| Temple name | Thai | Location |
|---|---|---|
| Wat Chettharam | วัดเจษฎาราม | Mahachai |
| Wat Mahachai Klai Nimit | วัดมหาชัยค้ลายนิมิด | Mahachai |
| Wat Pom Wichian Chotikaram | วัดป้อมวิเชียรโชดิการาม | Mahachai |
| Wat Sattha Yim Phanit Wararam | วัดศรัทธายิ้มพานิชวราราม | Mahachai |
| Wat Tuk Maha Chayaram | วัดดึกมหาชยาราม | Mahachai |
| Wat Suthiwat Wararam | วัดสุทธิวาตวราราม | Tha Chalom |
| Wat Laem Suwannaram | วัดแหลมสุวรรณาราม | Tha Chalom |
| Wat Krokkrak | วัดโกรกกราก | Krokkrak |

                                                                                                                                

== Transportation ==
The city is the intersection of highway 35 eastbound (Bangkok route), highway 35 westbound (Pak Tho district, Ratchaburi province), Ekkachai road (no. 3242) (Chom Thong district, Bangkok).
There is Maeklong Railway a Wongwian Yai - Mahachai train service, starting from Wongwian Yai station, Bangkok, to Mahachai station (distance 33.1 kilometres (20.6 mi)) every day from 05.30-20.00 hrs, and a Tha Chalom - Mae Klong train service, starting from Ban Laem station, Tha Chalom subdistrict, to Maeklong station, Samut Songkhram (distance 33.7 kilometres (20.9 mi)).
