= Talat Phlu =

Community and marketplace in Bangkok, Thailand

Coordinates: 13.716489°N 100.473861°E

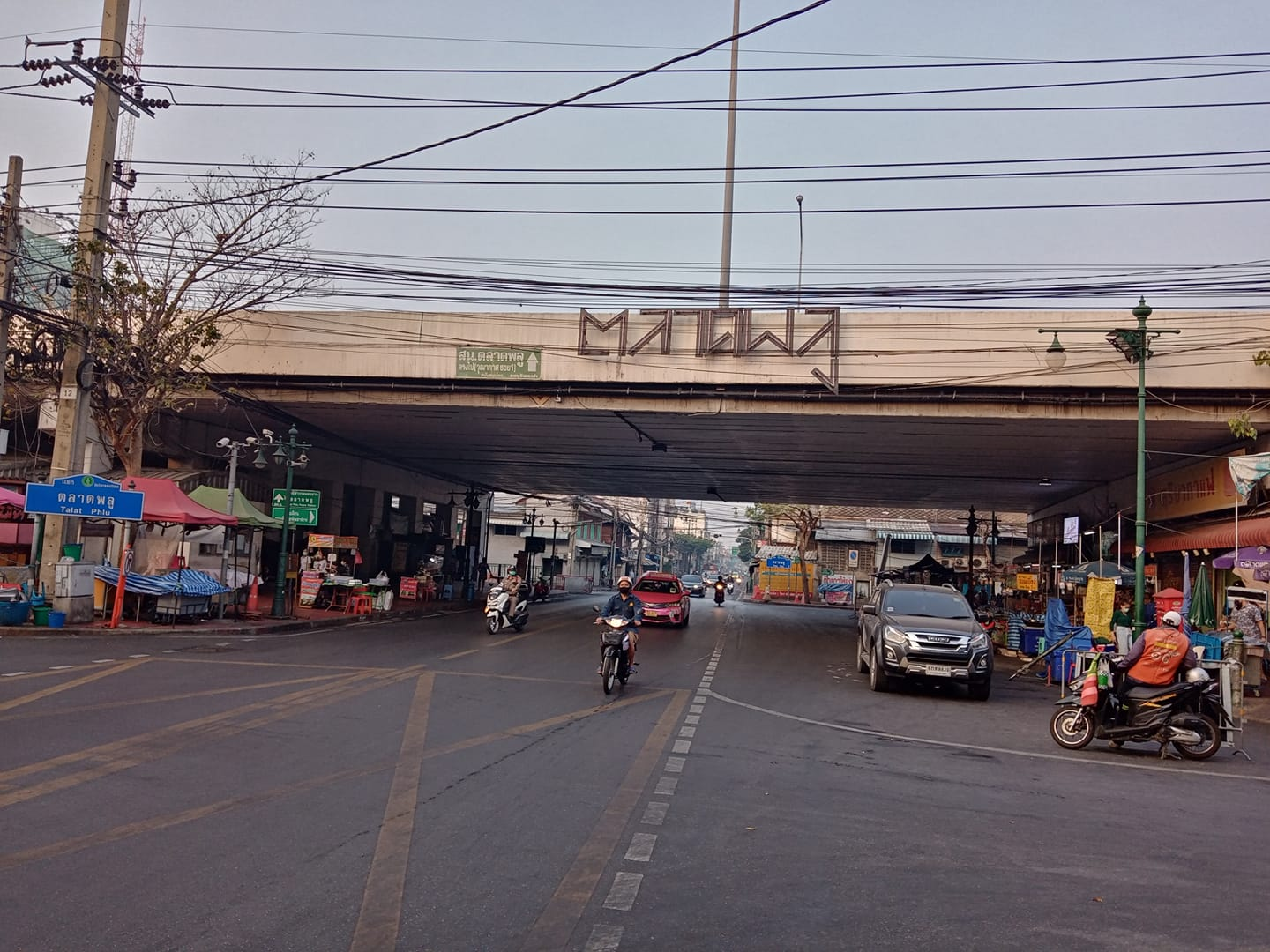
Thoet Thai Road is the main thoroughfare of Talat Phlu quarter.

Talat Phlu or Talad Phlu (Thai: ตลาดพลู, pronounced [tā.làːt pʰlūː]) is a community and marketplace by the canal Khlong Bangkok Yai in Talat Phlu subdistrict, Thon Buri district, Thonburi side of Bangkok.

== History and present ==
The history of Talat Phlu dates back to the reign of King Taksin of the Thonburi Kingdom, which followed the fall of Ayutthaya in 1767. At that time, the Thonburi side of the Chao Phraya River became the new capital of Siam (the former name of Thailand). Talat Phlu was home to overseas Chinese and Sino Thai communities, as well as Muslim and Mon. After King Rama I ascended the throne and established the Rattanakosin Kingdom, the capital was moved across the river to the Phra Nakhon side. Most of the Chinese community relocated to Sampheng, but some remained in Talat Phlu, with their descendants living there to this day.

The name "Talat Phlu" comes from the extensive betel plantations once owned by Sino Thai families. These plantations stretched from Khlong Bang Sai Kai to Khlong Bang Phrom and as far as Khlong Bang Waek. The harvested betel leaves were sold in the area from the dyke in front of Wat Ratchakhrue to Wat Intharam, making it the main wholesale market for areca nut (mak) and betel (phlu). Hence, the name "Talat Phlu," or "betel market," was born. Although betel cultivation has long disappeared, the name still survives.

During its heyday in the 1950s–1960s, Talat Phlu was a bustling district, often compared to Yaowarat as one of Bangkok's Chinatowns. Two adjacent cinemas were landmarks of the area: Si Talat Phlu, locally known as Vic Tia (วิกเตี้ย, lit. 'low theatre'), and Si Nakhon Thon, known as Vic Sung (วิกสูง, lit. 'high theatre'). Both were extremely popular among residents. Notably, the first cinema was the beginning of the Poolvaraluk family's business, later growing into Major Cineplex, while the second was the first enterprise of Somsak Techaratanaprasert, founder and chairman of Sahamongkol Film International.

Food culture also flourished during this prosperous era. Every household in Talat Phlu, especially in Trok Rong Che (Soi Thoet Thai 21), was known for making gui chai, dumplings stuffed with garlic chives or other fillings. This dish, a form of Teochew dim sum that had been introduced to Siam since the reign of King Rama V, became a distinctive local specialty.

Today, Talat Phlu is most famous for its street food, with gui chai still standing out as the symbol of the neighbourhood. Alongside the culinary scene, many traditional shophouses and old buildings decorated with delicate Chinese-style stucco and wooden fretwork remain, offering visitors a glimpse of its rich cultural past.

== Area ==
The name "Talat Phlu" could be taken in a broad sense to encompass the areas of Talat Phlu (subdistrict), Bang Yi Ruea, Bukkhalo, Dao Khanong, it is more often used to refer to the subdistrict only. This area is also known as the origin of the Hong Thai (inhaler) brand.

== Transportation ==
Talat Phlu can be reached by the State Railway of Thailand (SRT)'s Talat Phlu railway station on Mae Klong Railway Line.

The area is close to Talat Phlu BTS station on the BTS Skytrain's Silom Line, as well as Pho Nimit BTS and Wutthakat BTS stations.

Ratchadaphisek and Thoet Thai Roads are the main streets of the area. Soi Phet Kasem 23 (Soi Punyalit Seni) is a shortcut to reach Talat Phlu from Phet Kasem Road in Phasi Charoen area.

Talat Phlu is also served by several bus lines, including (Thoet Thai side) 4 (3-36), 9, 43, 111 (4-20), 3-54, as well as at least two rot kapoh (local minibus) lines, and (Ratchadaphisek side), such as 15 (4-2), 57 (4-41), 68 (4-12), 101 (4-5), 108 (4-19), 147 (4-25), 195 (3-50), 205 (3-51).

== In popular culture ==
Talat Phlu, along with Talat Phlu railway station, is mentioned in the 2024 film How to Make Millions Before Grandma Dies as the residence of the female protagonist, Mengju or Ama, and is also the actual filming location.
