= Thoet Thai Road =

Street in Bangkok, Thailand

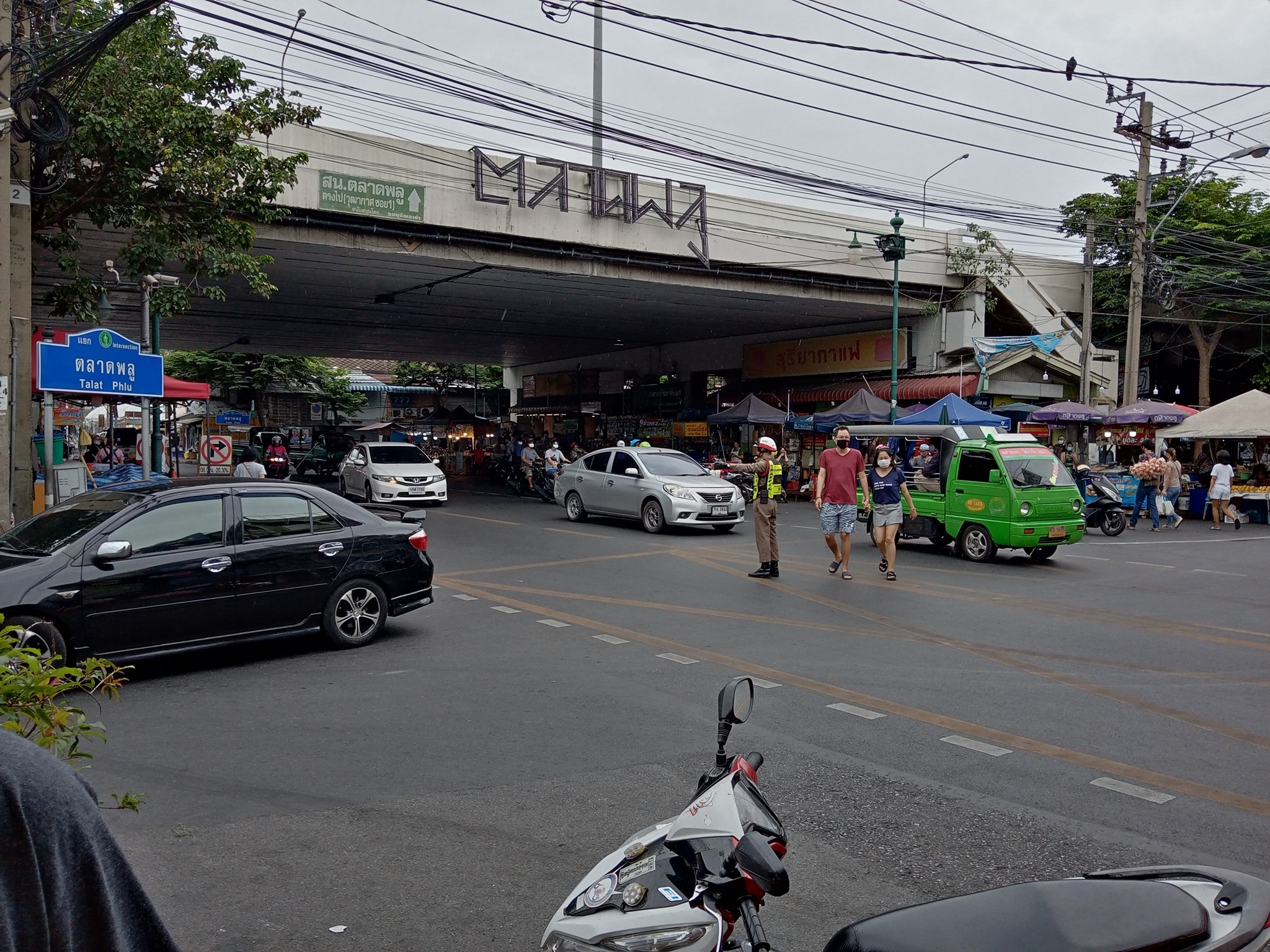
- Thoet Thai Road at the Talat Phlu intersection, where it connects with Ratchadaphisek Road beneath the overpass crossing Khlong Bangkok Yai and the Maeklong Railway line.
- Interactive map of Thoet Thai Road
- Native name: ถนนเทอดไท
- Former name: Phatthanakan Road
- Location: Bangkok, Thailand
- Coordinates: 13°42′56″N 100°27′20″E
- Northeast end: Bang Yi Ruea Junction, Thon Buri
- Southwest end: Phatthanakan Junction, Bang Khae

Thoet Thai Road (Thai: ถนนเทอดไท, pronounced [tʰà.nǒn tʰɤ̂ːt tʰaj]) is a minor streets in the Thonburi area on the western side of Bangkok. It begins at the intersection with Intharaphithak Road at Bang Yi Ruea junction in Thon Buri district, then runs south toward the Talat Phlu area. It continues further south, crosses Khlong Dan into Phasi Charoen district, then curves slightly northward, briefly enters Chom Thong district, and continues to the area behind Seacon Bangkae. Finally, it enters Bang Khae district and terminates at Phatthanakan junction in Bang Khae district, where it meets Bang Khae Road, also known as Sukhaphiban 1 Road.

Originally known as "Phatthanakan Road" (ถนนพัฒนาการ, [tʰà.nǒn pʰát.tʰá.nā.kāːn]), this road was constructed in 1937. Its development played a significant role in transforming the Talat Phlu community, which had previously been an agricultural settlement of diverse ethnic groups including Chinese, Mon, and Muslim residents. Over time, the area gradually evolved into an important commercial district, with a growing number of traditional shophouses and small family-run stores, a character that has been preserved to the present day.

Thoet Thai Road passes several important landmarks, such as Bang Yi Ruea Police Station, Wat Weluratchin, the Thon Buri District Office, Suan Phlu Mosque, Wat Intharam, Wat Chantharam, Wat Ratchakhrue, Talat Phul Police Station, Wat Khun Chan, Wat Apson Sawan, Wat Nang Chi, Wat Nak Prok, Wat Ang Kaeo, etc.

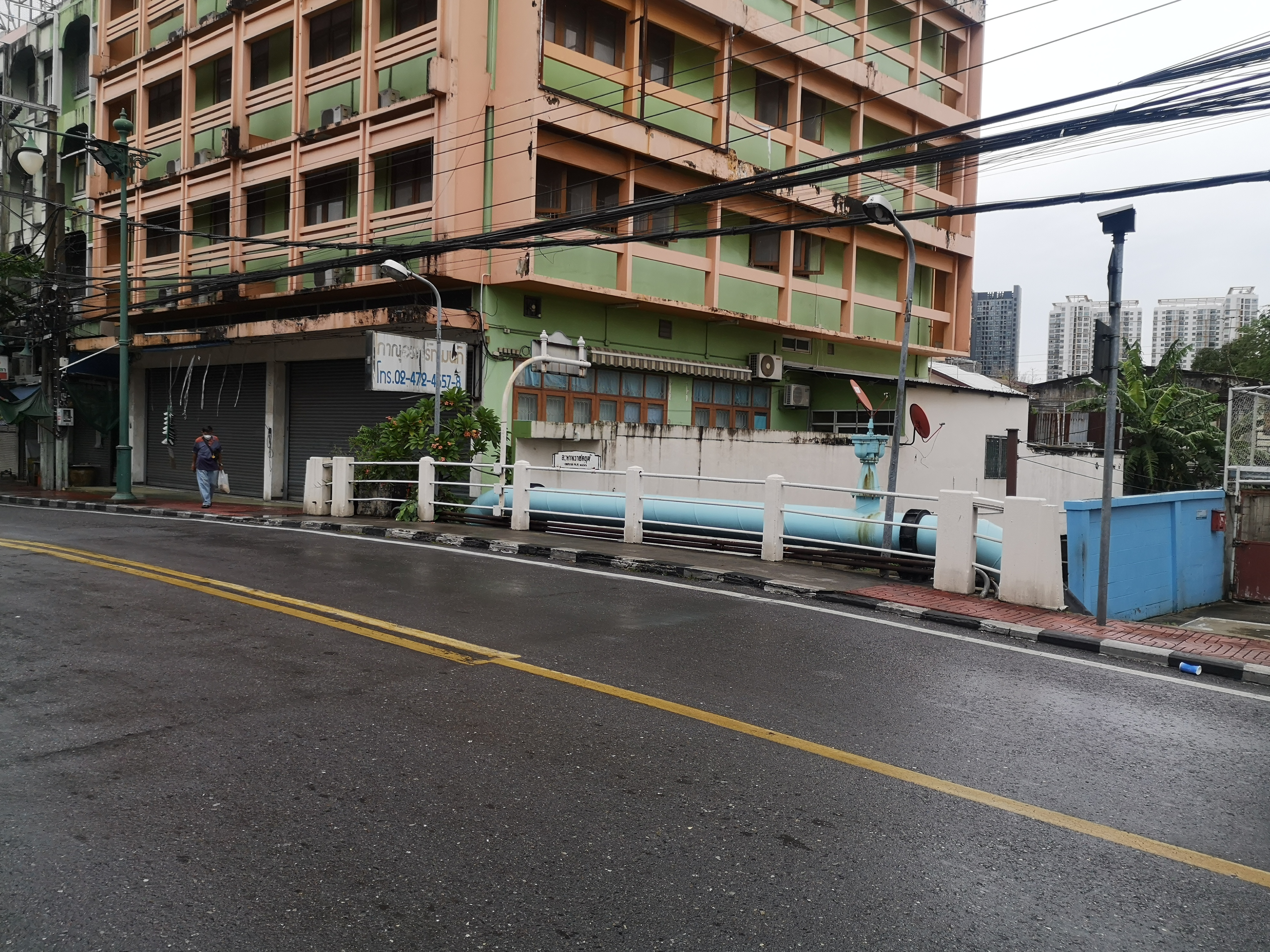
The road at Ratchakhrue Bridge, which crosses Khlong Bang Nam Chon and forms the boundary between Bang Yi Ruea on the left and Talat Phlu on the right.

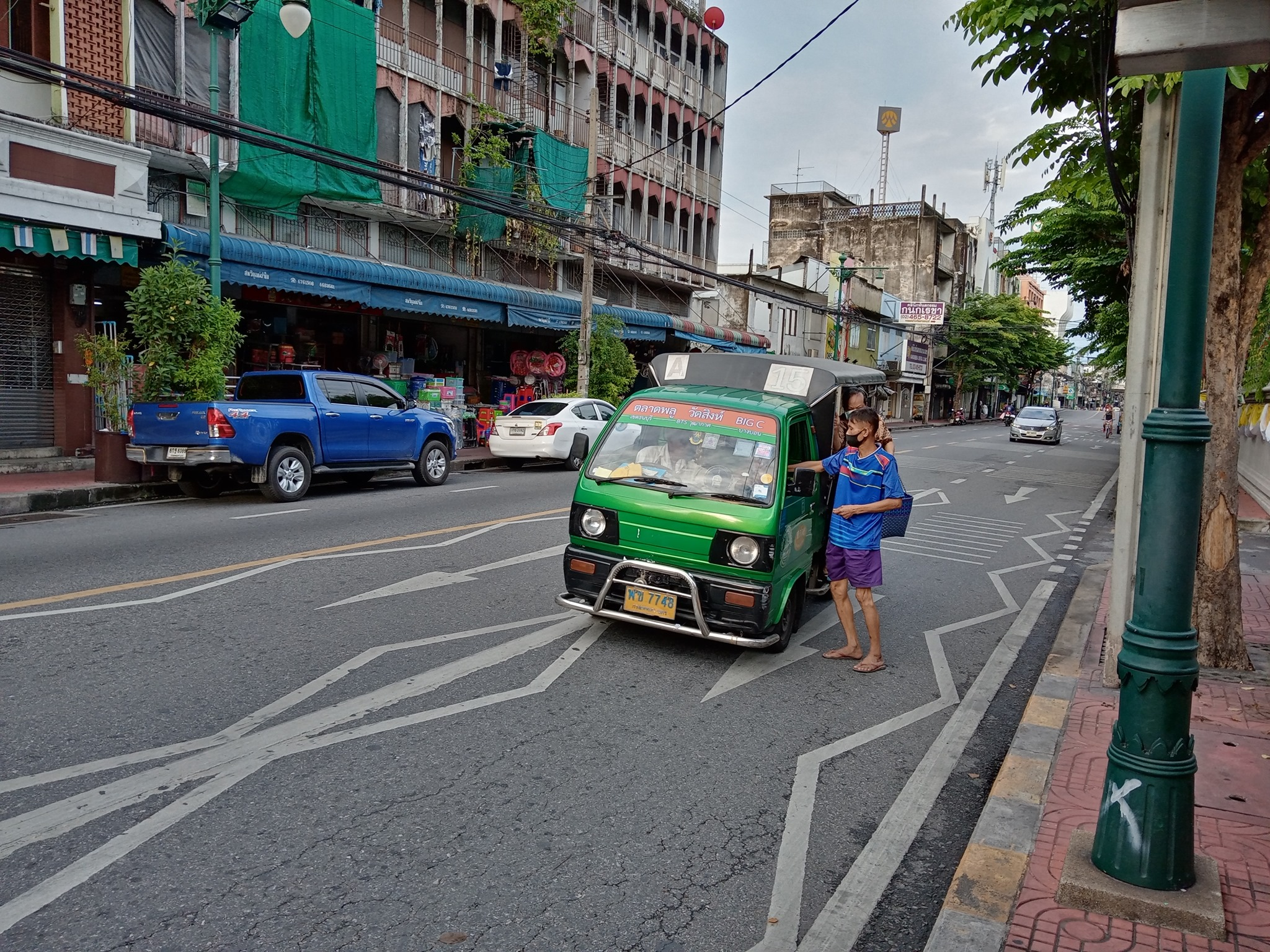
A rot kapo (รถกะป๊อ) or "Subaru" (a type of tuk-tuk) operates along Thoet Thai Road in the Talat Phlu area.

Although it is only a secondary street, it serves as an important connector to major routes and transport systems. For example, it provides access to Talat Phlu railway station on the Maeklong Railway line, as well as Talat Phlu BTS station on the Silom Line. It can also be used as a shortcut to Phetkasem Road (Highway 4) via Soi Phetkasem 23, which is close to both BTS and MRT Bang Wa stations, a key interchange in Bangkok's rail network. Alternatively, via Soi Phetkasem 31, it connects to the Khlong Phasi Charoen boat service at Phetkasem 31 Pier. In addition, the entrance of this soi is also the location of Phetkasem 48 MRT station.
