= Samut Songkhram =

Samut Songkhram สมุทรสงคราม
- Town municipality
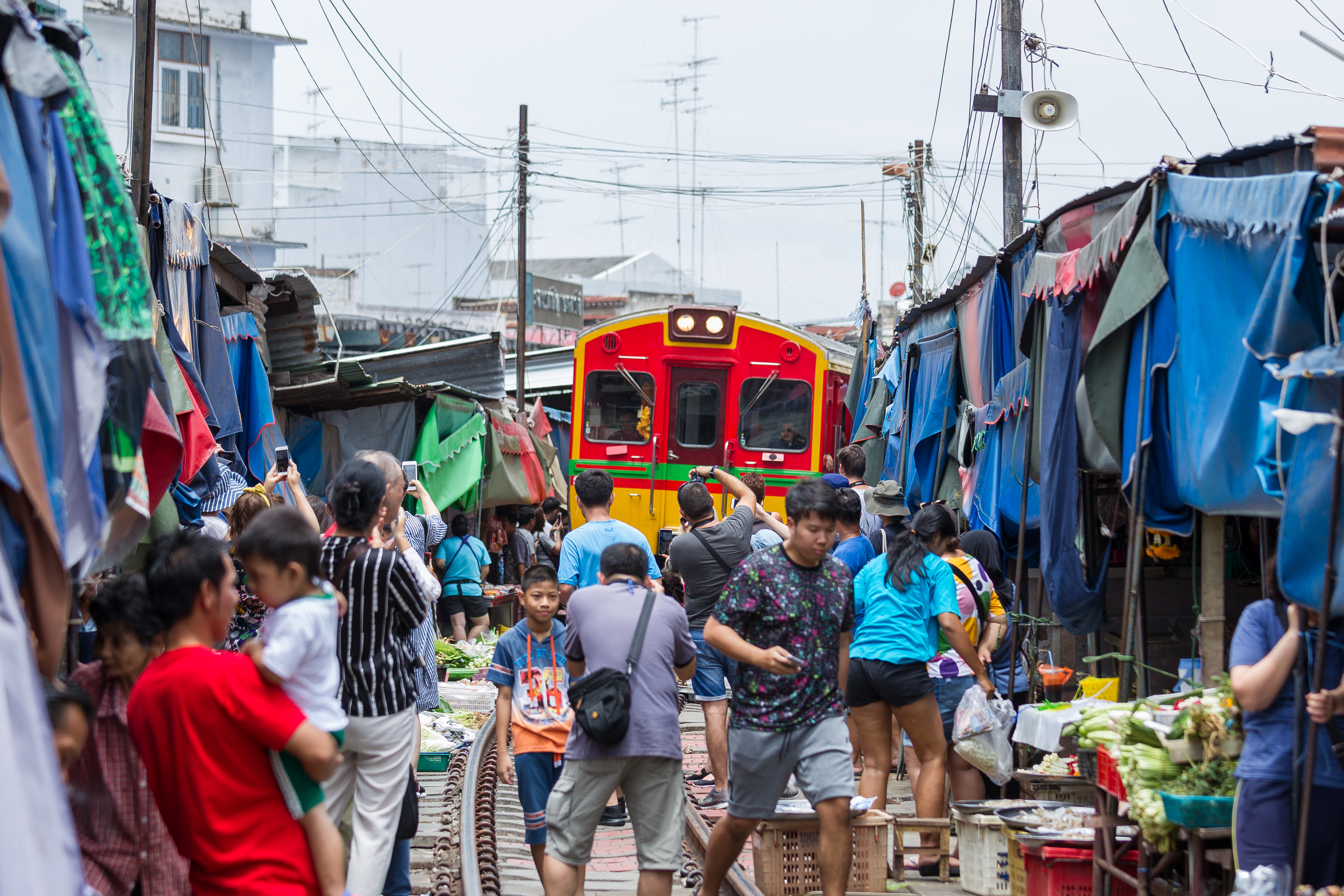
- Maeklong railway station

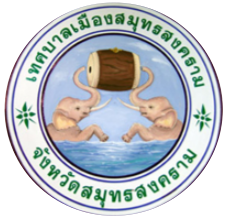
- Seal
- Nickname: Mae Klong
- Location within Thailand
- Country: Thailand
- District: Mueang Samut Songkhram District

Area
  - Total: 8.0 km^{2} (3.1 sq mi)

Population (2023)
  - Total: 25,623
  - Density: 3,203/km^{2} (8,300/sq mi)
- Time zone: UTC+7 (ICT)
- Postal code: 75000
- Calling code: 034
- ISO 3166 code: TH-750101
- Website: smsk-city.go.th

Samut Songkhram (Thai: สมุทรสงคราม (Pronunciation)) is a city in Central Thailand region, the capital of Samut Songkhram province, a route to the south of Thailand. It is 63 kilometres (39 mi) from Bangkok and has a population of 25,623 people as of 2023.

== Toponymy ==
The word "samut" originates from the Sanskrit word "samudra" meaning "ocean", and the word "songkhram" from the Sanskrit "sangrama" meaning "war". Hence the name of the province literally means "war ocean".

== Geography ==
Samut Songkhram is at the mouth of the Mae Klong River to the Gulf of Thailand. By means of canals (khlong) the water of the river is spread through the province for irrigation. At the coast are many evaporation ponds for producing sea salt.
The subdistrict is bordered to the north by Ban Prok and Lat Yai subdistricts, Mueang Samut Songkhram district, to the east by Bang Kaeo and Bang Chakreng subdistricts, Mueang Samut Songkhram district, to the south by Bang Chakreng and Laem Yai subdistricts, Mueang Samut Songkhram district, to the west by Laem Yai and Yai Hat subdistricts, Mueang Samut Songkhram district.

== History ==
In the Ayutthaya period the area of Samut Songkhram was known as Suan Nok (Thai สวนนอก, "outer garden") and was administrated by Ratchaburi. During the reign of King Taksin it became a province. It was the birthplace of Queen Amarindra of King Rama I, who also initiated the name Suan Nok. The birthplace of King Rama II in Amphawa district is now a memorial park.
On 29 November 1936 Samut Songkhram town municipality was established, with an area of approximately 3.0 square kilometres (1.2 sq mi). and was expanded to a total area of 8.0 square kilometres (3.1 sq mi) on 10 November 1965.

== Economy ==
Most of the people in the municipality are fisherman or work in the three processed seafood factories.

== Transportation ==
The subdistrict is the intersection of highway 35 eastbound (Bangkok route), highway 35 westbound (Pak Tho district, Ratchaburi province), highway 325 northbound (Bang Phae district, Ratchaburi province).
There is Maeklong Railway a Tha Chalom - Mae Klong train service, starting from Ban Laem station, Tha Chalom subdistrict, Samut Sakhon to Maeklong station, Samut Songkhram (distance 33.7 kilometres (20.9 mi)).

== Administration ==
=== Central government ===
The administration of Samut Songkhram city is responsible for only Mae Klong subdistrict (tambon) with 5,000 rai ~ 8.0 square kilometres (3.1 sq mi) and 25,623 people, but no villages (muban).

Map of Mae Klong subdistrict

=== Local government ===
Samut Songkhram town municipality (thesaban mueang) covers the whole Mae Klong subdistrict. There are 14 communities (chumchon), although not directly chosen by the local citizens, which provides advice and recommendations to the local administrative organization.

Communities of Samut Songkhram

No.	Community	Thai
1.	Wat Yai	วัดใหญ่
2.	Soi Wat Lang Ban	ซอยวัดหลังบ้าน
3.	Ekachai	เอกชัย
4.	Soi Chumsai Thorasap	ซอยชุมสายโทรศัพท์
5.	Wat Pomkaew	วัดป้อมแก้ว
6.	Wat Phet Samut Worawihan	วัดเพชรสมุทรวรวิหาร
7.	Talat	ตลาด
8.	Wat Thammanimit	วัดธรรมนิมิต
9.	Bang Chakreng 1	บางจะเกร็ง 1
10.	Bang Chakreng 2	บางจะเกร็ง 2
11.	Bang Chakreng 3, 4	บางจะเกร็ง 3, 4
12.	Laem Yai	แหลมใหญ่
13.	Wat Pratum Kanawat	วัดประทุมคณาวาส
14.	Saphan 4 - Wat Puangmalai	สะพาน 4 - วัดพวงมาลัย

== Religion ==
Most of the people in the municipality are Buddhist. There are six Buddhist temples and a Christian church.

=== Temples ===
The following active temples, where Theravada Buddhism is practised by local residents:

Temple name	Thai	Location
Wat Yai	วัดใหญ่	Comm.1
Wat Pomkaew	ซัดป้อมแก้ว	Comm.5
Wat Phet Samut Worawihan	วัดเพชรสมุทรวรวิหาร	Comm.6
Wat Thamnimit	วัดธรรมนิมิต	Comm.8
Wat Pratum Kanawat	วัดประทุมคณาวาส	Comm.13
Wat Puangmalai	วัดพวงมาลัย	Comm.14

== Education ==
There are the following schools in the city:

- Wat Yai Municipality school (comm.1)
- Wat Pomkaew Municipality school (comm.5)
- Wat Thamnimit Municipality school (comm.8)
- Wat Pratum Kanawat Municipality school (comm.13)
- Saengwanit Municipality school (comm.14)
- Thawaranukul school (comm.3)
- Samut Songkhram Municipality school (comm.3)
- Prakob Witthaya school (comm.2)
- Anuban Samut Songkhram school (comm.4)
- Drunanukul school (comm.10)
- Kong Li Chian Lin school (comm.14)

== Healthcare ==
There is no health promoting hospital in Mae Klong. But there are Somdej Phra Phuttaloetla Hospital (282 beds) and Mae Klong 2 Hospital (60 beds), as well as 42 private and dental clinics.

== Notable people ==
- Chang and Eng Bunker, the original "Siamese twins"

== Climate ==
Climate data for Samut Songkhram (1992–2019)
Month	Jan	Feb	Mar	Apr	May	Jun	Jul	Aug	Sep	Oct	Nov	Dec	Year
Mean daily maximum °C (°F)	30.5 (86.9)	31.3 (88.3)	32.3 (90.1)	33.6 (92.5)	33.7 (92.7)	33.2 (91.8)	32.8 (91.0)	32.9 (91.2)	32.4 (90.3)	31.7 (89.1)	31.4 (88.5)	30.7 (87.3)	32.2 (90.0)
Daily mean °C (°F)	26.0 (78.8)	27.4 (81.3)	28.7 (83.7)	29.8 (85.6)	29.6 (85.3)	29.2 (84.6)	28.8 (83.8)	28.8 (83.8)	28.3 (82.9)	27.9 (82.2)	27.2 (81.0)	25.8 (78.4)	28.1 (82.6)
Mean daily minimum °C (°F)	21.6 (70.9)	23.3 (73.9)	25.0 (77.0)	25.9 (78.6)	26.2 (79.2)	26.0 (78.8)	25.7 (78.3)	25.7 (78.3)	25.2 (77.4)	24.7 (76.5)	23.5 (74.3)	21.5 (70.7)	24.5 (76.2)
Average precipitation mm (inches)	19.4 (0.76)	3.8 (0.15)	41.8 (1.65)	138.1 (5.44)	250.8 (9.87)	248.0 (9.76)	250.0 (9.84)	210.0 (8.27)	220.0 (8.66)	260.0 (10.24)	66.1 (2.60)	9.6 (0.38)	1,717.6 (67.62)
Average precipitation days (≥ 1.0 mm)	2	1	3	4	11	14	15	16	17	18	6	2	109
Source: Soil Resources Survey and Research Division

== Gallery ==
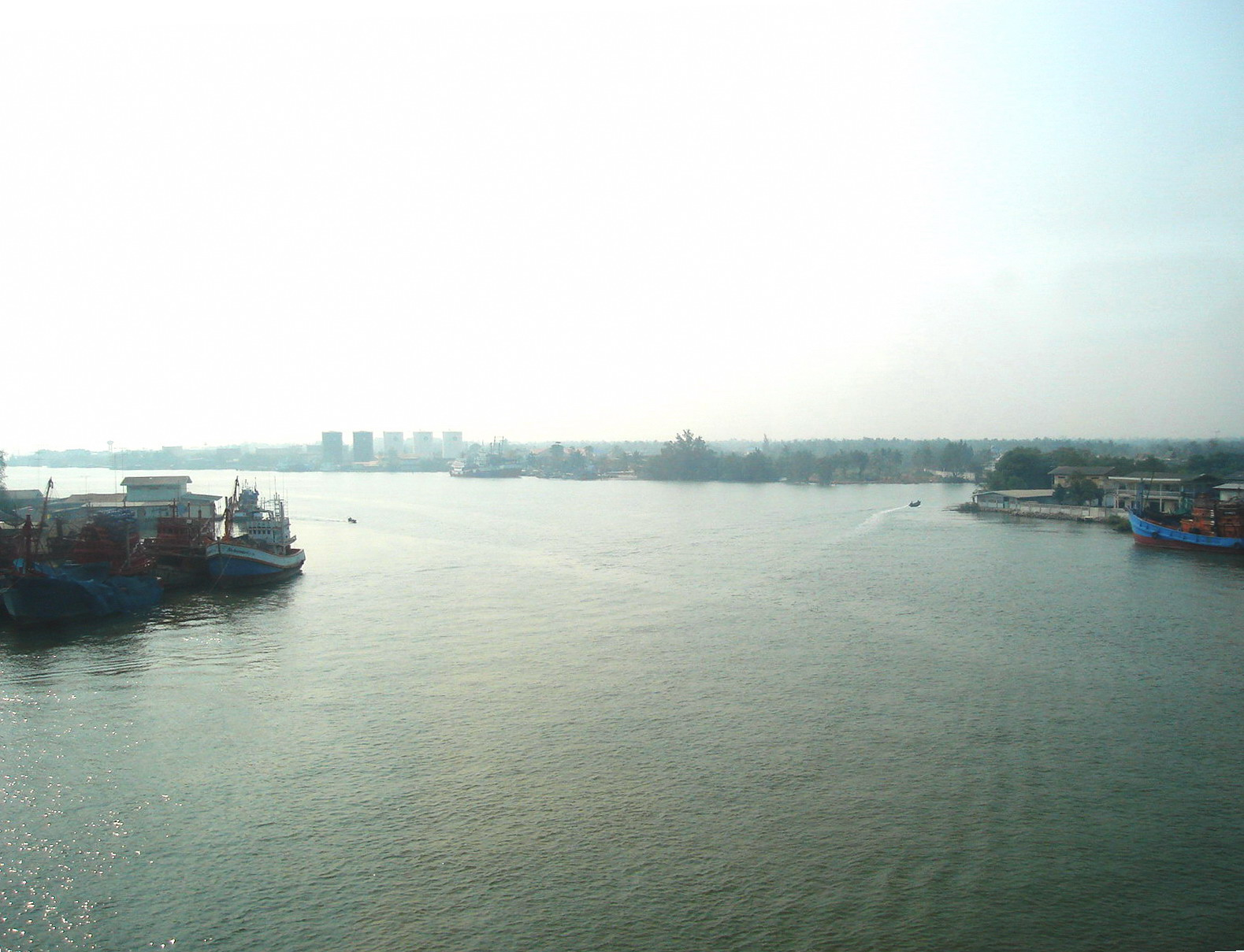
Mae Klong River, Samut Songkhram

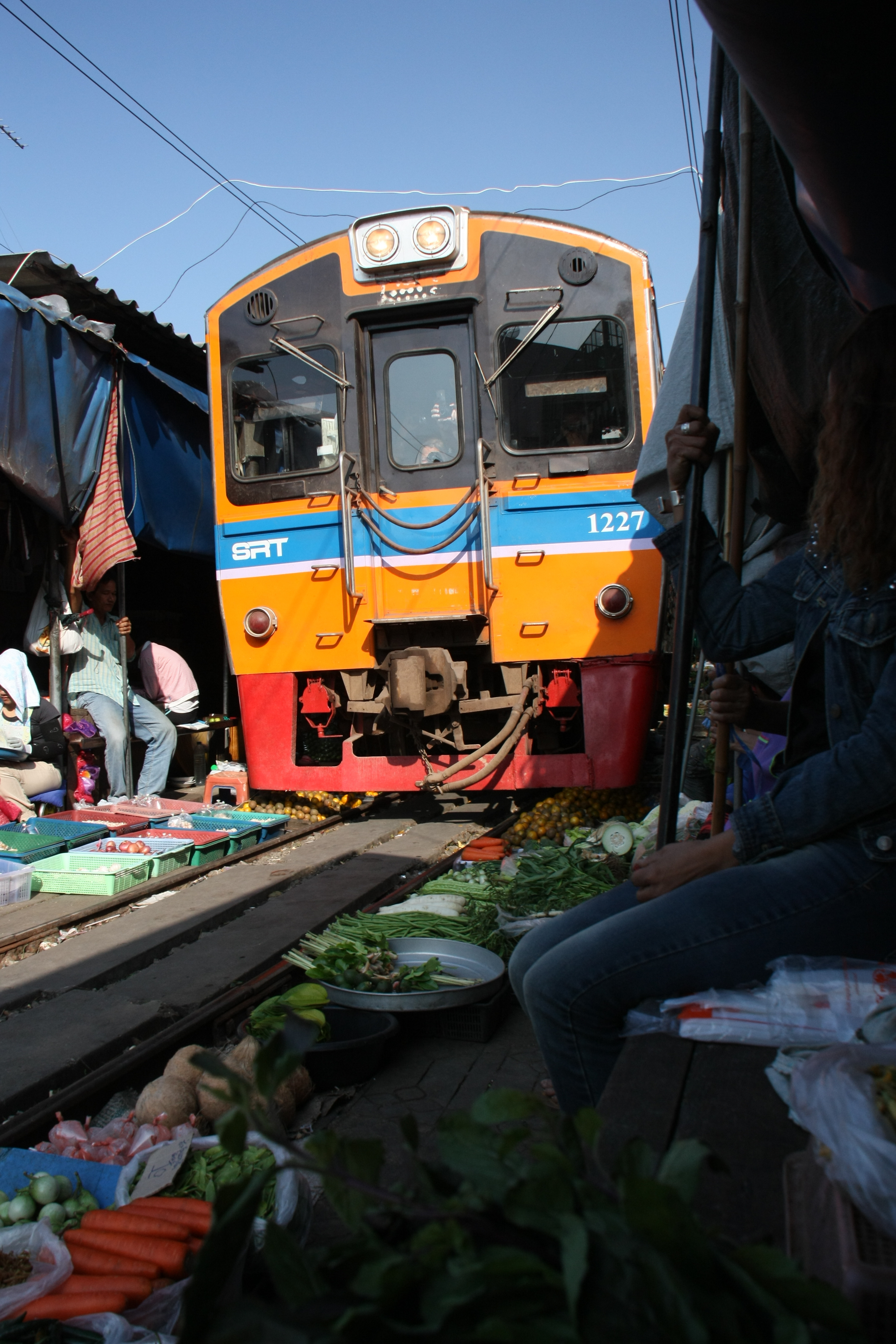
Maeklong Railway train, Samut Songkhram

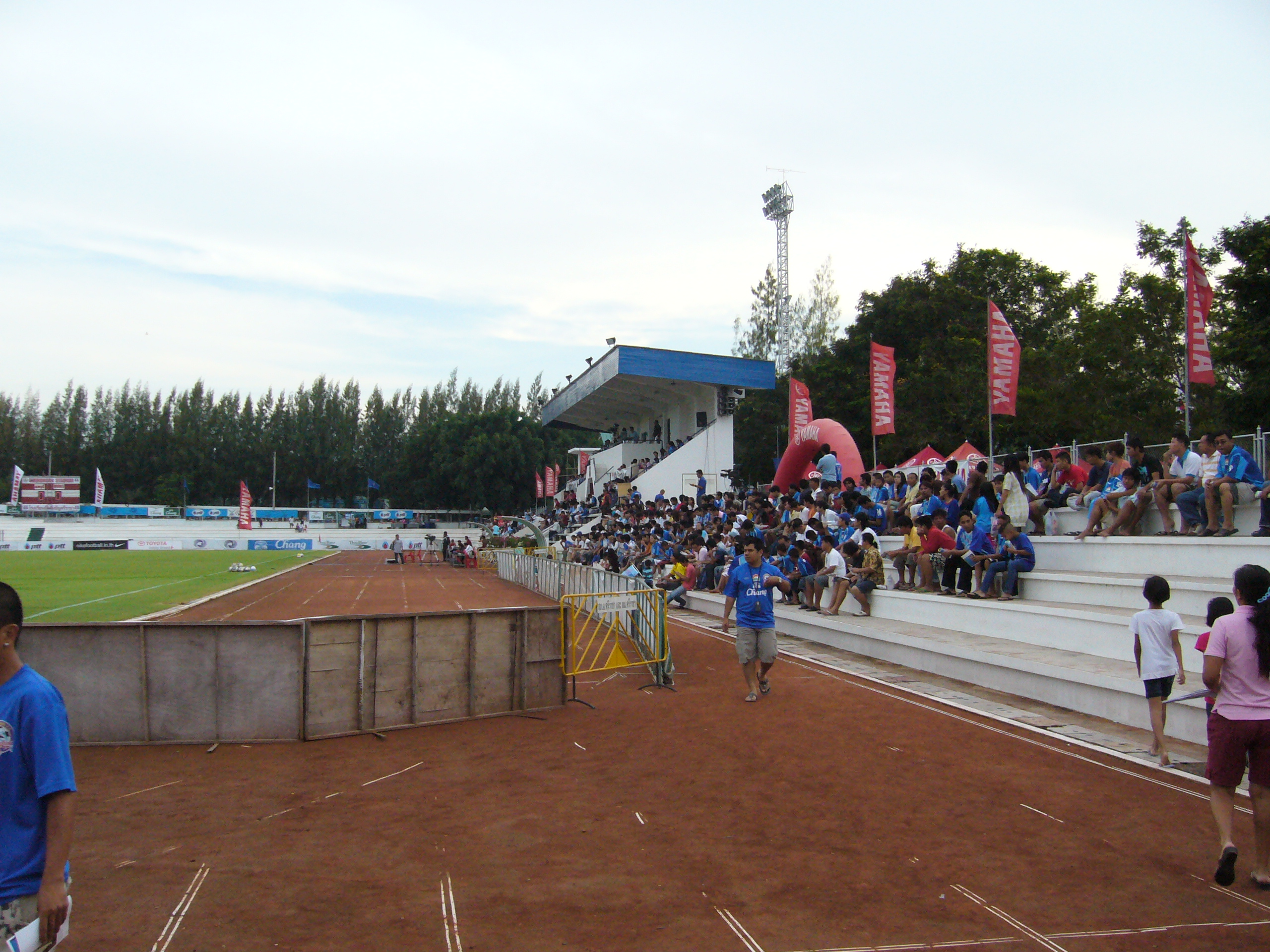
Samut Songkhram football field
