= Wat Sing railway station =

Railway station in Bangkok, Thailand

Coordinates: 13.6833°N 100.4478°E

Wat Sing วัดสิงห์
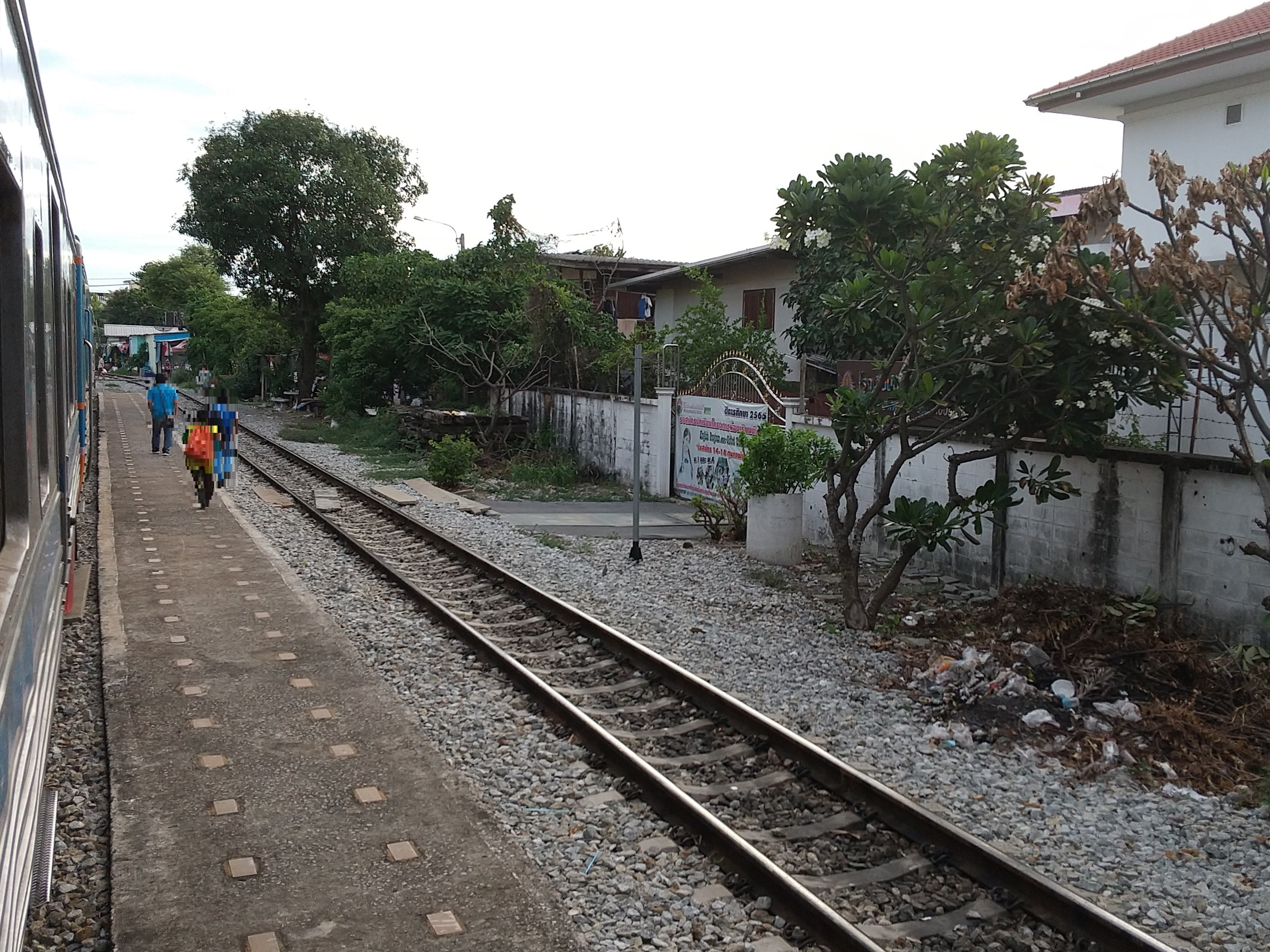
- The railway station in mid-2023

General information
- Location: Soi Ekkachai 43, Bang Khun Thian subdistrict, Chom Thong district Bangkok; Thailand
- Operator: State Railway of Thailand
- Line: Mahachai Line
- Platforms: 2
- Tracks: 2

Construction
- Structure type: At-grade
- Parking: Yes

Other information
- Station code: สิ.
- Classification: Class 2

History
- Opened: 29 December 1904
- Original company: Tachin Railway Ltd.

Services
Preceding station	State Railway of Thailand	Following station
Bang Bon Halt towards Mahachai	Maeklong Railway Wongwian Yai–Mahachai	Wat Sai Halt towards Wongwian Yai
Location

Wat Sing railway station is a railway station located in Bang Khun Thian subdistrict, Chom Thong district, Bangkok. It is a class 2 railway station. Currently, 34 rail services operate at the station. It is one of the few stations on the single-track line with a passing loop.

Wat Sing is planned to be a station on the SRT Dark Red Line extension to Mahachai.

== History ==
The station opened on 29 December 1904 during the reign of King Chulalongkorn, as part of the Pak Khlong San–Mahachai railway operated by the Tachin Railway Ltd.

It's named after Wat Sing, a nearby local Buddhist temple.
