= Talat Phlu station =

Talat Phlu station may refer to:

- Talat Phlu railway station of the Maeklong Railway
- Talat Phlu BTS station of the BTS Silom Line
