= Rang Pho railway station =

Railway station in Bangkok, Thailand

Coordinates: 13.6391°N 100.3980°E

Rang Pho รางโพธิ์
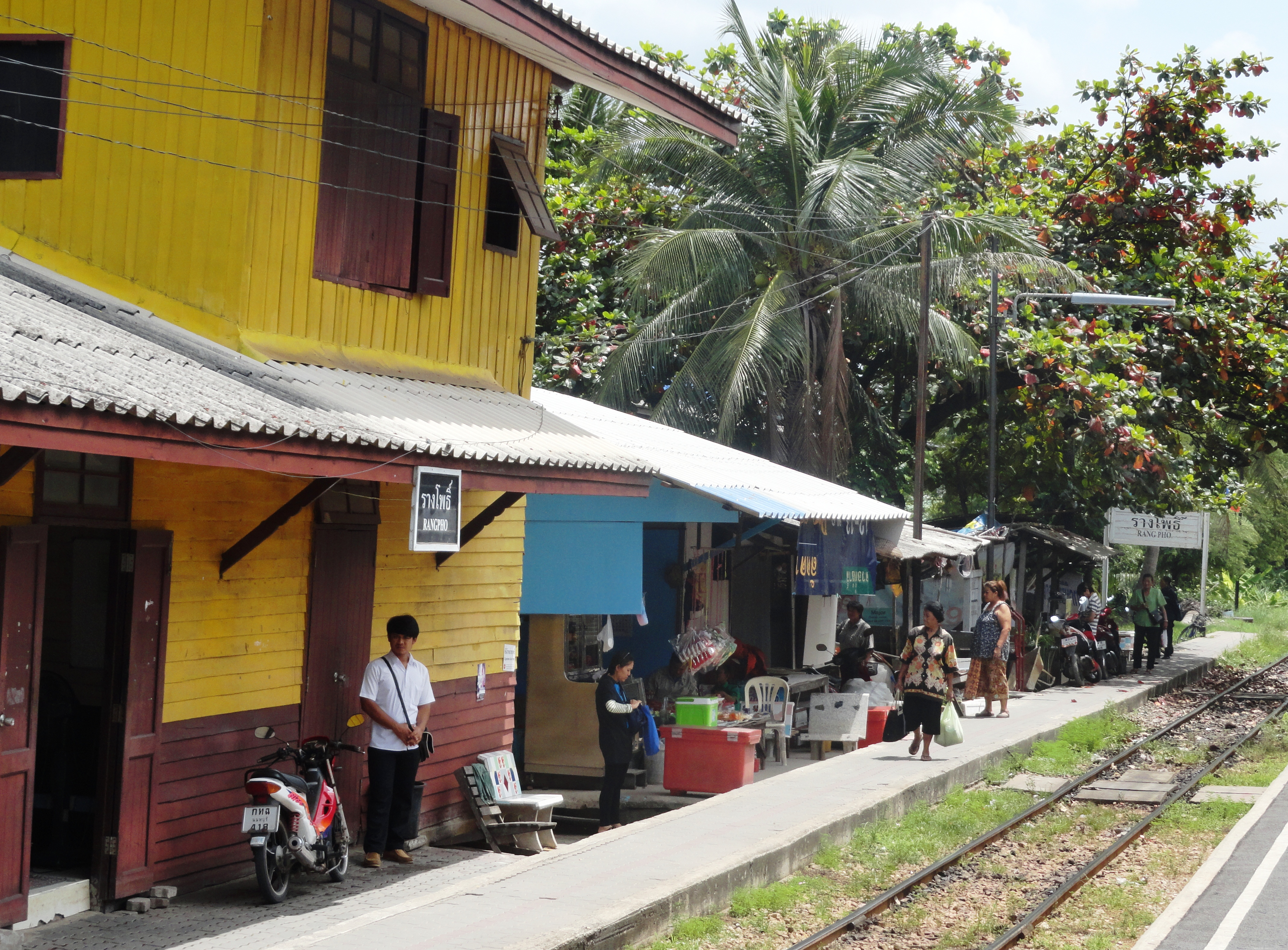

General information
- Location: Rama II Road Soi 82 (Soi Rang Pho), Bang Bon Tai subdistrict, Bang Bon district, Bangkok; Central Region; Thailand
- Operator: State Railway of Thailand
- Line: Mahachai Line
- Platforms: 2
- Tracks: 2

Construction
- Structure type: At-grade

Other information
- Station code: รโ.
- Classification: Class 2

History
- Opened: 29 December 1904
- Original company: Tachin Railway Ltd.

Services
Preceding station	State Railway of Thailand	Following station
Sam Yaek Halt towards Mahachai	Maeklong Railway Wongwian Yai–Mahachai	Kan Kheha towards Wongwian Yai
Location

Rang Pho railway station is a railway station located in Bang Bon Tai subdistrict, Bang Bon district, Bangkok. It is a class 2 railway station. Currently, 34 rail services operate at the station. It is one of the few stations on the single-track line with a passing loop.

== History ==
The station opened on 29 December 1904 during the reign of King Chulalongkorn, as part of the Pak Khlong San–Mahachai railway operated by the Tachin Railway Ltd.
