= Tha Chalom =

Tha Chalom ท่าฉลอม
- Tambon
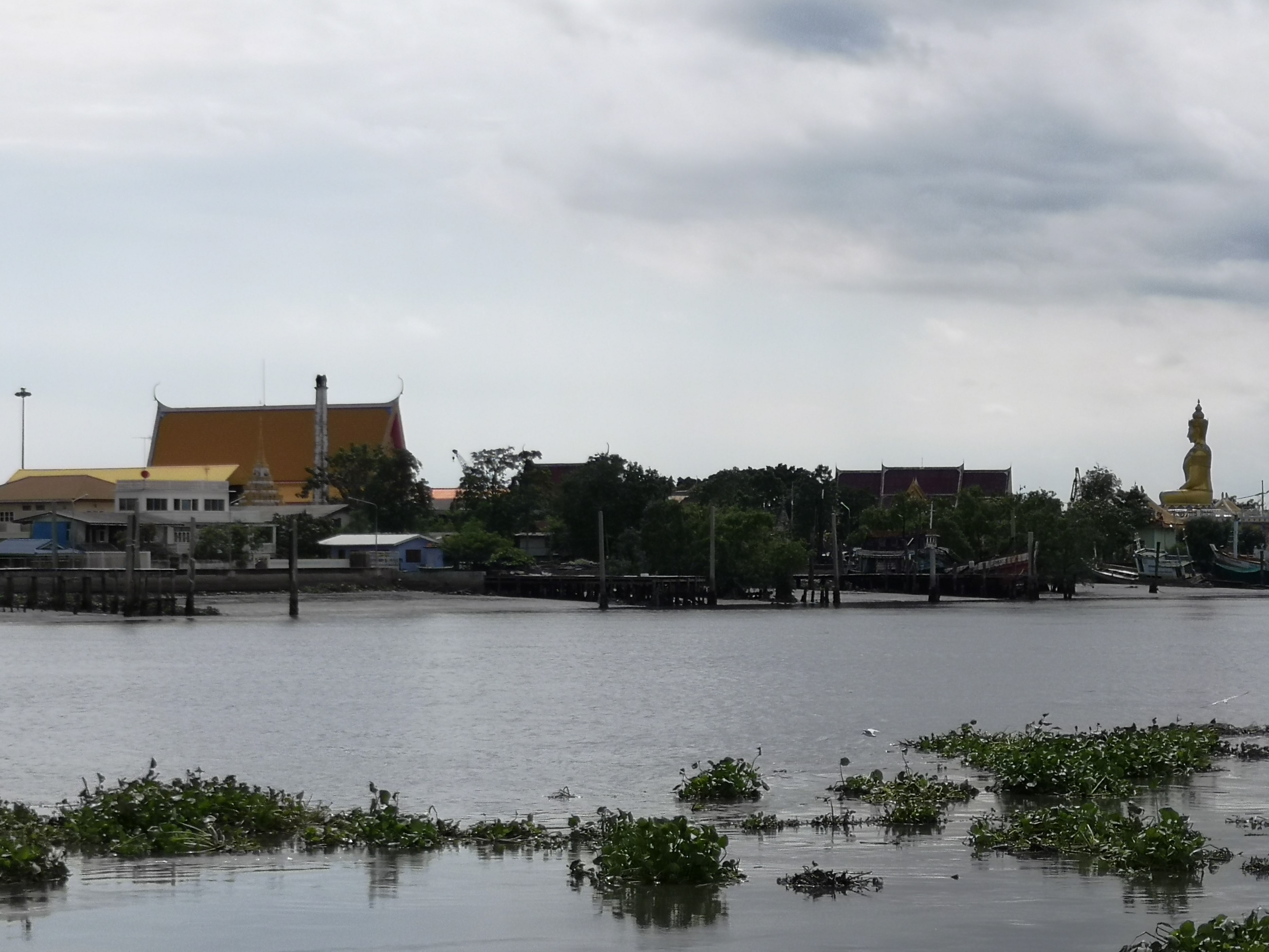
- Tha Chalom and Wat Laem Suwannaram as seen from Mahachai

- Location in Bangkok Metropolitan Region#Location in Thailand Tha Chalom (Thailand)
- Coordinates: 13°32′18″N 100°16′20″E
- Country: Thailand
- Province: Samut Sakhon
- District: Mueang Samut Sakhon

Government
  - Type: Part of City Municipality

Population (2024)
  - Total: 7,570
- Time zone: UTC+7 (ICT)
- Postal code: 74000
- Calling code: 034
- ISO 3166 code: TH-74010200
- Website: sakhoncity.go.th

Tha Chalom (Thai: ท่าฉลอม, pronounced [tʰâː t͡ɕʰā.lɔ̌ːm]) is a historic subdistrict (tambon) of Samut Sakhon, Mueang Samut Sakhon district, Samut Sakhon province, central Thailand. Its name is also a name of surrounding area.

== History ==
Tha Chalom has a history dating back to the mid-Ayutthaya period, during the reign of King Maha Chakkraphat, when he established Ban Tha Chin (บ้านท่าจีน) as a town. At that time, Tha Chalom and Mahachai were predominantly Chinese communities, with many Chinese piers along both banks of the Tha Chin River. The river was thus named Tha Chin, which means "Chinese pier".

Tha Chalom is regarded as the first sukhaphiban (sanitary district) in Thailand. It was established in 1905 by King Chulalongkorn (Rama V), after observing the unsanitary conditions in Nakhon Khuan Khan (now Phra Pradaeng district, Samut Prakan province), reportedly said, "As dirty as Mahachai market". The Ministry of Interior, under Prince Damrong Rajanubhab, then cleaned up the town and built new roads for the King. Upon completion, the King presided over the official road opening ceremony on March 18, 1905, and named it "Thawai Road" (offer road).

== Toponymy ==
The name "Tha Chalom" means "pier of Chalom" (Chalom is a type of Thai vendor boat similar to junk).
Tha Chalom in the reign of King Chulalongkorn was the capital of the province and more prosperous than Mahachai side.

== Geography ==
The general topography of the subdistrict is a coastal lowland about 1 meter above sea level. There are no islands, mountains or minerals. The main watercourse of Samut Sakhon, Tha Chin River flows into the Gulf of Thailand at Bang Ya Phraek subdistrict. Tha Chalom is a peaceful enclave in Samut Sakhon city.
Neighboring subdistricts are (from the north clockwise): Mahachai, Krokkrak and Tha Chin of Mueang Samut Sakhon district of Samut Sakhon province.

== Administration ==
=== Central government ===
The administration of Tha Chalom subdistrict (tambon) is responsible for 7,570 people from 2,470 households.

No.	Subdistrict	Thai	Communities	Population
2.	Tha Chalom	ท่าฉลอม	6	7,570

Samut Sakhon city municipality

=== Local government ===
As of December 2024 there is ฺSamut Sakhon city municipality (thesaban nakhon) which covers the combined area of (1) Mahachai, (2) Tha Chalom and (3) Krokkrak subdistricts. There are 6 communities (chumchon) in Tha Chalom, although not directly chosen by the local citizens, which provides advice and recommendations to the local administrative organization.

== Education ==
There is Wat Suwannaram municipal school.

== Healthcare ==
There is no health promoting hospital in Tha Chalom subdistrict. But there is Metropolitan Hospital Tha Chalom.

== Economy ==
Most locals work in fisheries. Miniature fishing boat models and dried seafood are local products.

== Religion ==
=== Temples ===
The following active temples, where Theravada Buddhism is practised by local residents:

Temple name	Thai	Location
Wat Suthiwat Wararam	วัดสุทธิวาตวราราม	Tha Chalom
Wat Laem Suwannaram	วัดแหลมสุวรรณาราม	Tha Chalom

=== Chinese shrine ===
There is Chaopho Guan Yu in Tha Chalom.

=== Roman Catholic church ===
There is Saint Anne Catholic church in Tha Chalom.

                                                                                                                                

== Transportation ==
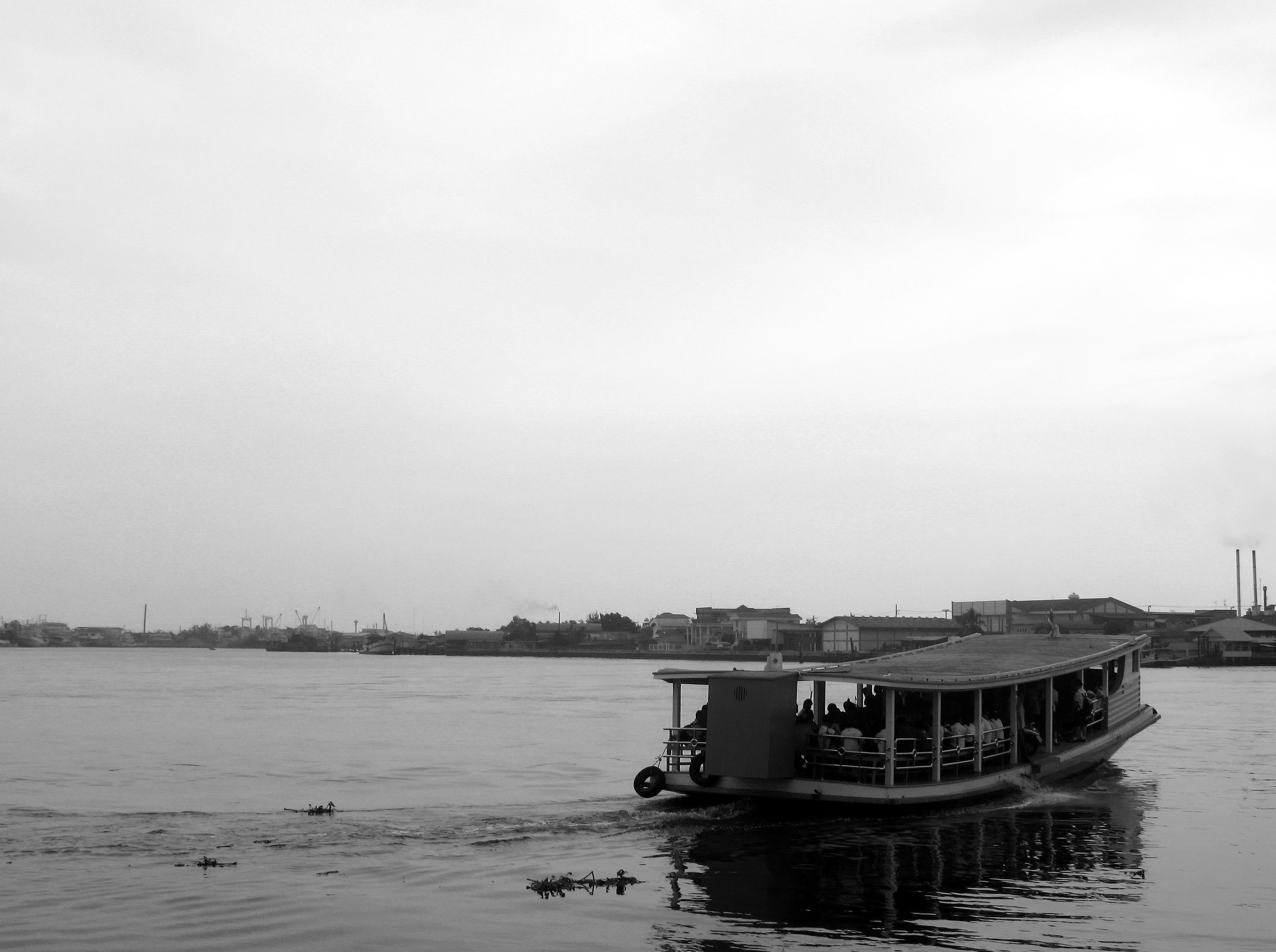
Tha Chin River Ferry

Presently, Tha Chalom residents still preserve their traditional way of life, old buildings with chic graffiti can still be seen on the streets. Pedicabs serve the area.

There is Maeklong Railway a Tha Chalom - Mae Klong train service, starting from Ban Laem station, Tha Chalom subdistrict, to Maeklong station, Samut Songkhram (distance 33.7 kilometres (20.9 mi)).

Traveling between Tha Chalom and Mahachai must rely mainly on the Tha Chin River Ferry.

== Popular culture ==
Tha Chalom is the setting of a Thai luk krung song, titled 'Tha Chalom', the story of a Tha Chalom fisherman falling in love with the beauty living in Mahachai. It was sung by Charin Nuntanakorn in the year 1961.
