= Wutthakat BTS station =

Coordinates: 13.7123°N 100.4710°E

Wutthakat วุฒากาศ
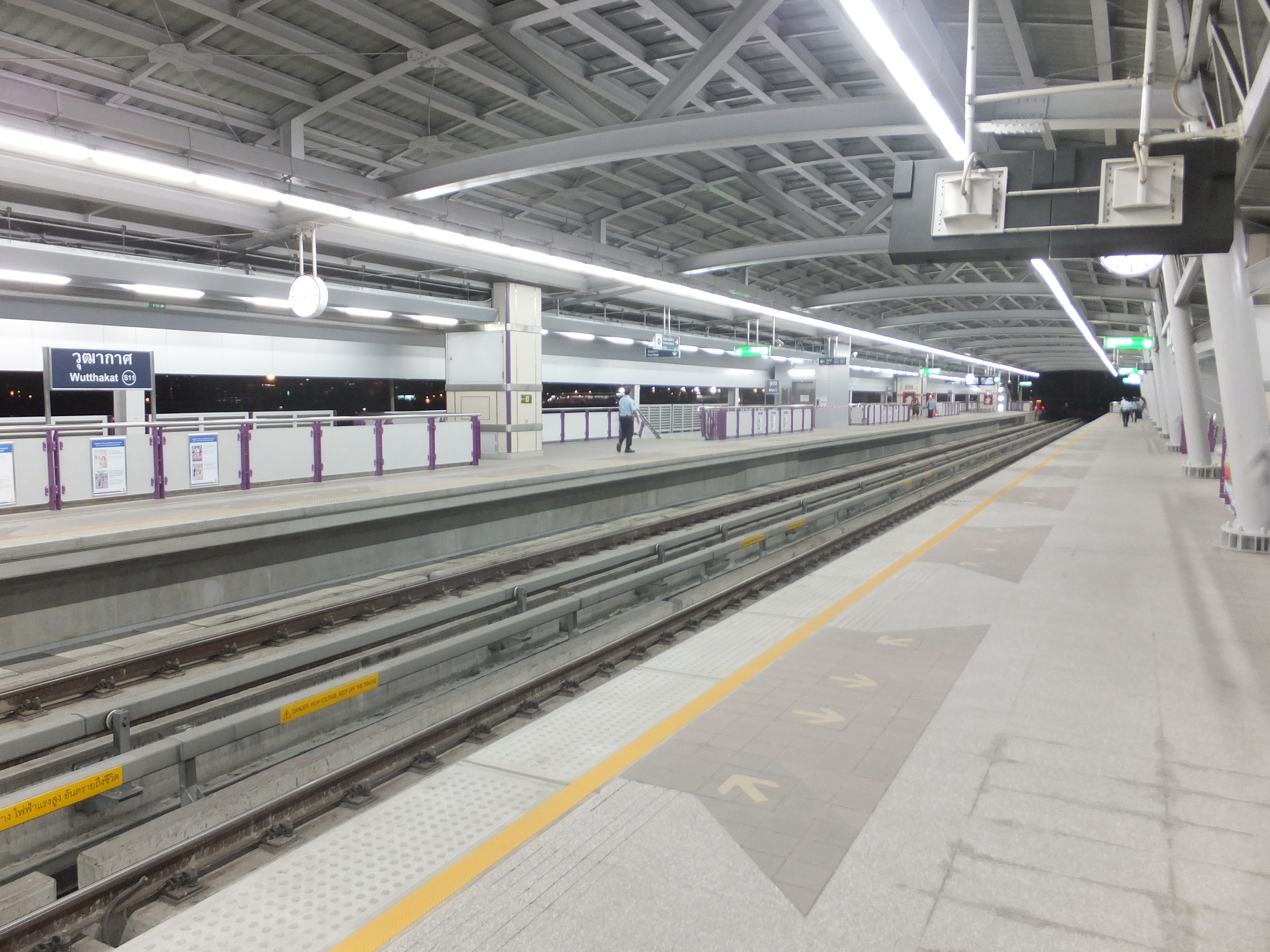
- Platform of Wutthakat BTS station

General information
- Location: Thon Buri and Chom Thong; Bangkok; Thailand
- System: BTS
- Owner: Bangkok Metropolitan Administration (BMA)
- Operator: Bangkok Mass Transit System Public Company Limited (BTSC)
- Line: Silom Line; Dark Red Line (planned)
- Connections: State Railway of Thailand (Maeklong Railway)

Other information
- Station code: S11

History
- Opened: 5 December 2013; 12 years ago

Passengers
- 2021: 1,209,856

Services
Preceding station	BTS Skytrain	Following station
Talat Phlu towards National Stadium	Silom Line	Bang Wa Terminus
Out-of-system intercharge
Preceding station	State Railway of Thailand	Following station
Khlong Ton Sai Halt towards Mahachai	Maeklong Railway Wongwian Yai–Mahachai transfer at Wutthakat Halt	Talat Phlu towards Wongwian Yai
Location

Wutthakat Station Traditional sign

Wutthakat BTS station (Thai: สถานีวุฒากาศ, pronounced [sā.tʰǎː.nīː wút.tʰāː.kàːt]) is a BTS skytrain station, on the Silom Line at the Thon Buri and Chom Thong District boundary, Bangkok, Thailand. The station is located on Ratchaphruek Road over the Khlong Dan canal. It is surrounded by residential buildings, small shops and office towers. The station opened on 5 December 2013.

== Wutthakat Railway Halt ==
Wutthakat railway halt was opened on 23 October 2020, providing a connection to the Maeklong Railway. It is about 150 m (492.1 ft) from the BTS station. It is planned to become a station on the Dark Red Line as part of the extension to Mahachai.

== Station layout ==
U3; Platform	Side platform, doors will open on the left
U3; Platform	Platform 4	Silom Line toward National Stadium (Talat Phlu)
U3; Platform	Platform 3	Silom Line toward Bang Wa (Terminus)
U3; Platform	Side platform, doors will open on the left
U2 ticket sales class	ticket sales floor	Exit 1–5, Passenger Service Center; Ticket Office, Ticket Machine, Shop
G Street level	-	Bus Stop; Montri Witthaya School, Mai Yai Nui Temple

== See also ==
- Bangkok Skytrain
