= Pho Nimit BTS station =

Coordinates: 13°43′09.0″N 100°29′09.3″E

Pho Nimit โพธิ์นิมิตร
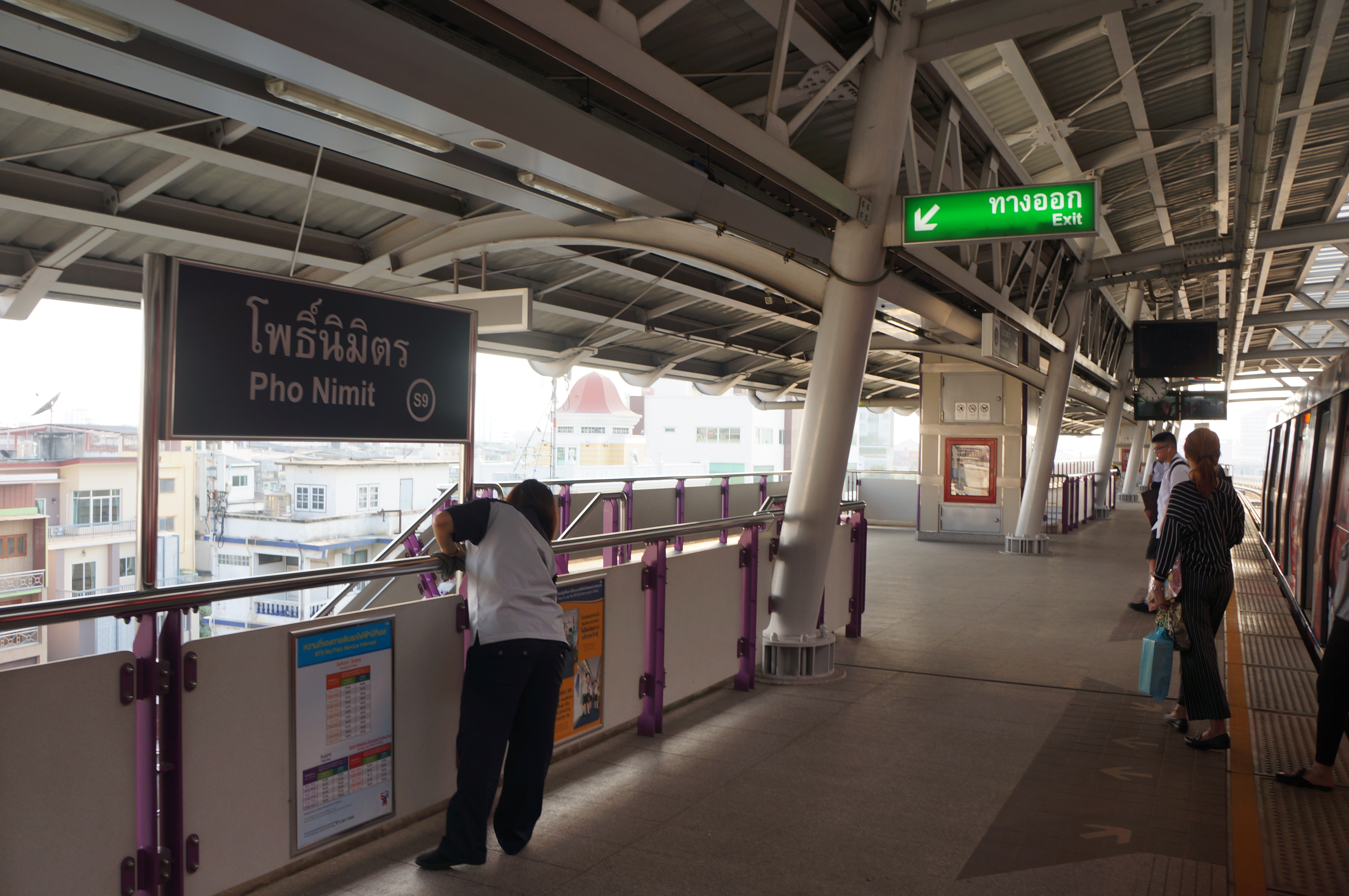

General information
- Location: Thon Buri; Bangkok; Thailand
- System: BTS
- Owner: Bangkok Metropolitan Administration (BMA)
- Operator: Bangkok Mass Transit System Public Company Limited (BTSC)
- Line: Silom Line

Other information
- Station code: S9

History
- Opened: 12 January 2013; 13 years ago

Passengers
- 2021: 328,396

Services
Preceding station	BTS Skytrain	Following station
Wongwian Yai towards National Stadium	Silom Line	Talat Phlu towards Bang Wa
Location

Pho Nimit Station Traditional sign

Pho Nimit BTS station (Thai: สถานีโพธิ์นิมิตร, pronounced [sā.tʰǎː.nīː pʰōː ní(ʔ).mít]) is a BTS skytrain station, on the Silom Line in Khwaeng Bukkhalo, Thon Buri District, Bangkok, Thailand. The station is located on Ratchaphruek Road. It is surrounded by residences, small shops and office towers.

The station opened on 12 January 2013.

== Station layout ==
U3; Platform	Side platform, doors will open on the left
U3; Platform	Platform 4	Silom Line toward National Stadium (Wongwian Yai)
U3; Platform	Platform 3	Silom Line toward Bang Wa (Talat Phlu)
U3; Platform	Side platform, doors will open on the left
U2 ticket sales class	ticket sales floor	Exit 1–4, Passenger Service Center; Ticket Office, Ticket Machine, Shop
G Street level	-	Bus Stop; Darun Witthaya School, Manee Witthaya School, Pho Nimit School

== See also ==
- Bangkok Skytrain
