= Talat Phlu BTS station =

Talat Phlu ตลาดพลู
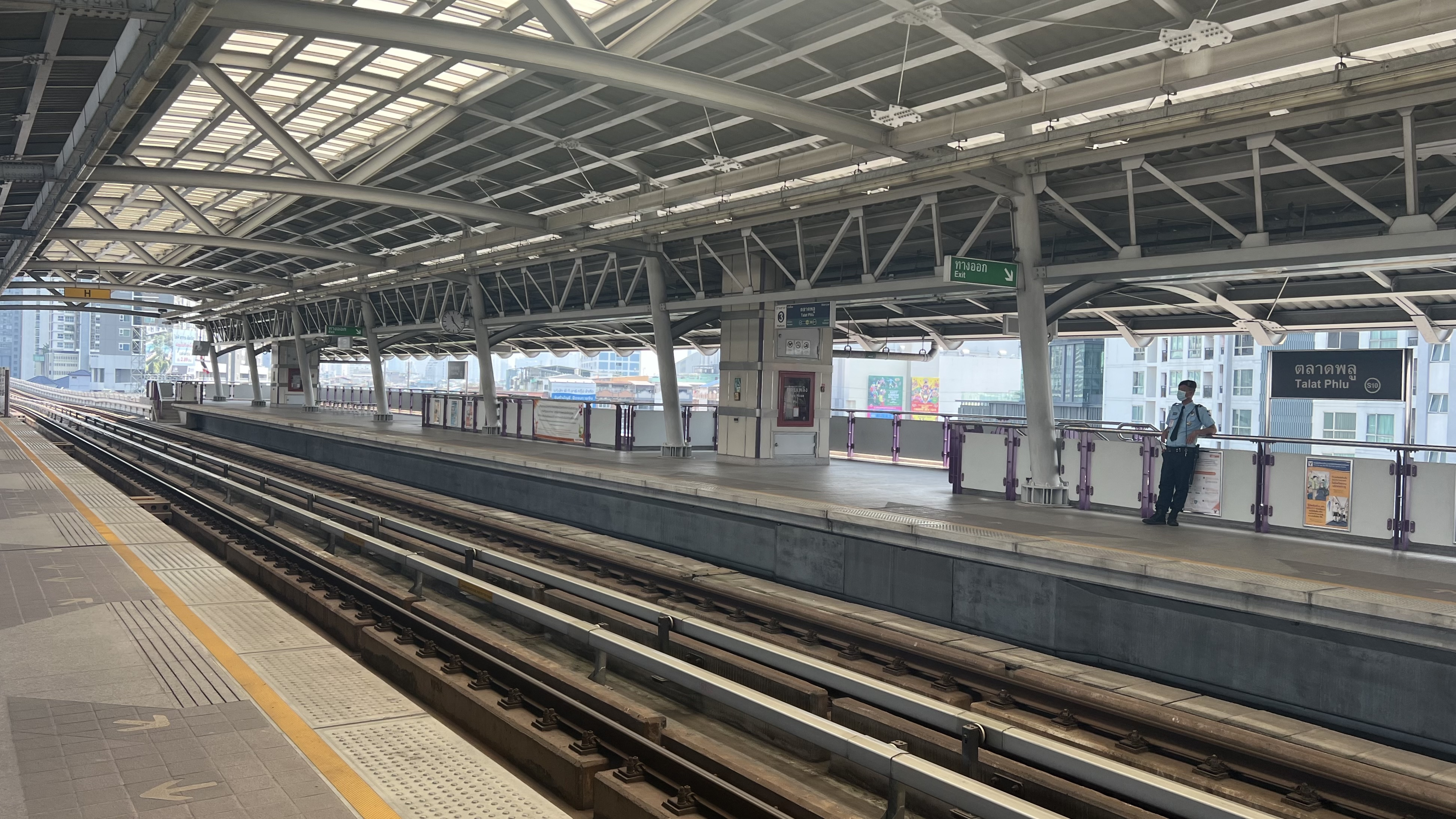
- Platform level in February 2024

General information
- Location: Dao Khanong, Thon Buri; Bangkok; Thailand
- Coordinates: 13°42′51.02″N 100°28′36.11″E
- System: BTS
- Owner: Bangkok Metropolitan Administration (BMA)
- Operator: Bangkok Mass Transit System Public Company Limited (BTSC)
- Line: Silom Line
- Connections: Bangkok BRT

Other information
- Station code: S10

History
- Opened: 14 February 2013; 13 years ago
- Former names: Ratchada – Ratchaphruek

Passengers
- 2021: 1,043,787

Services
Preceding station	BTS Skytrain	Following station
Pho Nimit towards National Stadium	Silom Line	Wutthakat towards Bang Wa
Location

Talat Phlu station (Thai: สถานีตลาดพลู, pronounced [sā.tʰǎː.nīː tā.làːt pʰlūː]) is a BTS skytrain station on the Silom Line in Thon Buri District, Bangkok, Thailand. The station is located above the Ratchadaphisek-Ratchaphruek intersection, surrounded by residences, small shops, and office towers. It is an interchange station with Ratchaphruek BRT station. Although the station has the same name as that of State Railway of Thailand's Talat Phlu railway station, it is located 1.2 km away from the BTS station.

Before construction, it was named "Ratchada-Ratchaphruek" station, but was changed to Talat Phlu station to avoid confusion with the BRT terminus station. The station opened on 14 February 2013 and the walkway to BRT was opened on 5 December 2013. It was the western terminus of the Silom Line between 14 February 2013 and 5 December 2013 until the opening of the Talat Phlu-Bang Wa section.

Although it was named "Talat Phlu" because it is located in the area of Talat Phlu. Indeed, it is located in the area of Dao Khanong near the boundary of Dao Khanong and Bukkhalo Sub-districts, Thon Buri District, diagonally from The Mall Tha Phra.

It is planned to be a station on the SRT Dark Red Line as part of the extension to Mahachai.

== Station layout ==
U3; Platform	Side platform, doors will open on the left
U3; Platform	Platform 4	Silom Line toward National Stadium (Pho Nimit)
U3; Platform	Platform 3	Silom Line toward Bang Wa (Wutthakat)
U3; Platform	Side platform, doors will open on the left
U2 ticket sales class	ticket sales floor	Exit 1–4, Passenger Service Center; Ticket Office, Ticket Machine, Shop
G Street level	-	Bus Stop; Footbridge to BRT Ratchaphruek Station; The Mall Tha Phra, Kantatararam Temple, Ratchada-Tha Phra Hospital

== See also ==
- Bangkok Skytrain
