= Talat Phlu railway station =

Railway station in Bangkok, Thailand

Coordinates: 13.7209°N 100.4780°E

Talat Phlu ตลาดพลู

General information
- Location: Thoet Thai Road, Talat Phlu subdistrict, Thon Buri district Bangkok; Thailand
- Operator: State Railway of Thailand
- Line: Mahachai Line
- Platforms: 1
- Tracks: 1
- Connections: BMTA / Private Jointed Bus; Taxis / Motorcycle taxi

Construction
- Structure type: At-grade

Other information
- Station code: ลู.
- Classification: Class 2

History
- Opened: 29 December 1904
- Original company: Tachin Railway Ltd.

Services
Preceding station	State Railway of Thailand	Following station
Wutthakat Halt towards Mahachai	Maeklong Railway Wongwian Yai–Mahachai	Wongwian Yai Terminus
Location

Talat Phlu railway station is a railway station located in Talat Phlu subdistrict, Thon Buri district, Bangkok. It is a class 2 railway station and serves Talat Phlu community. It is located in a different location to Talat Phlu BTS station. Currently, 34 rail services operate at the station.

== History ==
The station opened on 29 December 1904 during the reign of King Chulalongkorn, as part of the Pak Khlong San–Mahachai railway operated by the Tachin Railway Ltd.

The station, along with the nearby Talat Phlu neighbourhood and Tha Phra MRT station, was featured in the 2024 movie How To Make Millions Before Grandma Dies.
