= Ban Laem railway station =

Railway station in Samut Sakhon, Thailand

Coordinates: 13.5419°N 100.2699°E

Ban Laem บ้านแหลม
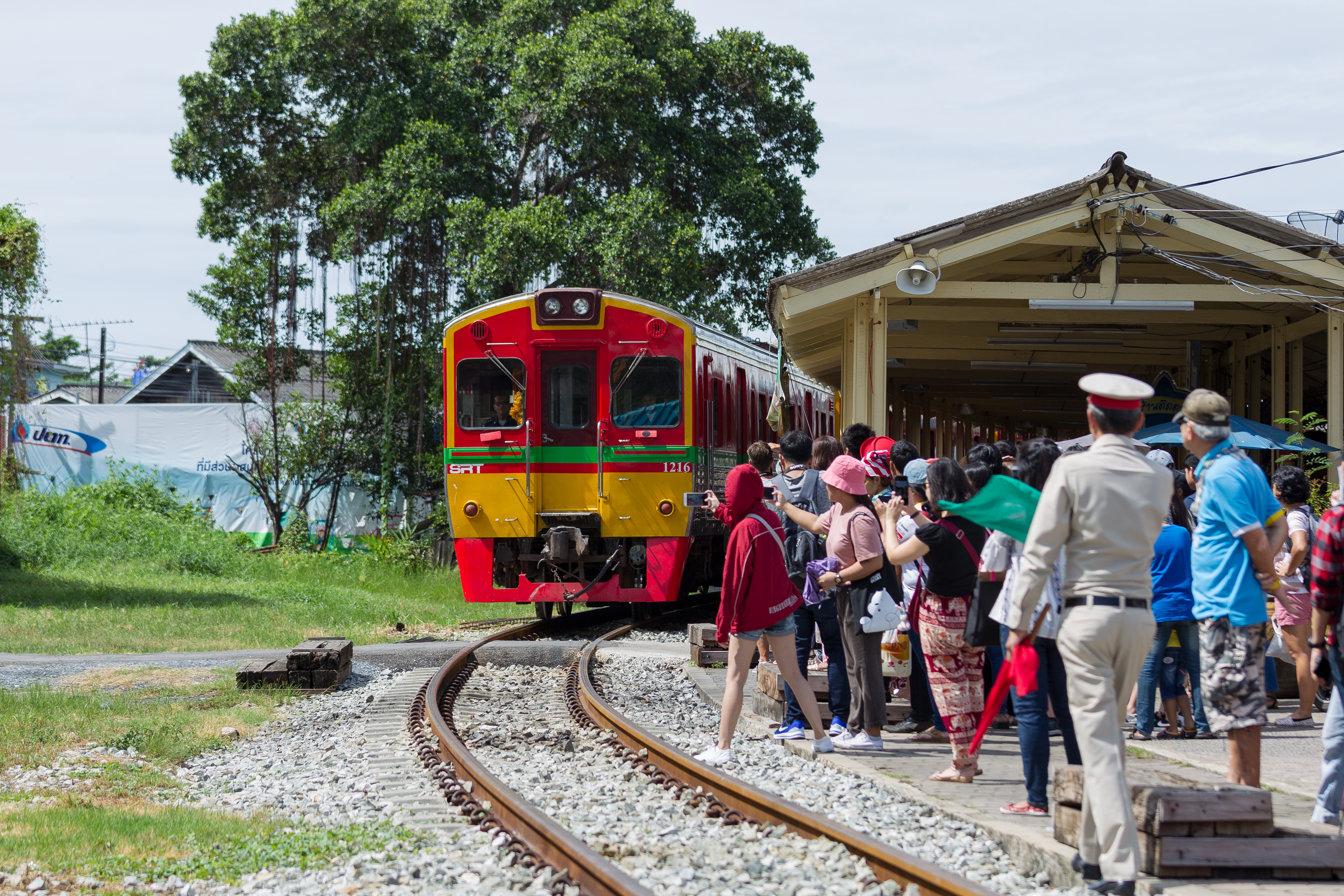

General information
- Location: Thawai Road, Tha Chalom subdistrict, Mueang Samut Sakhon district, Samut Sakhon province
- Owner: State Railway of Thailand
- Line: Maeklong Railway (Ban Laem–Maeklong Line)
- Platforms: 1
- Tracks: 1

Other information
- Station code: แห.

History
- Opened: 10 June 1905

Services
Preceding station	State Railway of Thailand	Following station
Tha Chalom City Hospital Halt towards Maeklong	Maeklong Railway Ban Laem–Maeklong	Terminus
Location

Ban Laem railway station is a railway station located in Tha Chalom subdistrict, Mueang Samut Sakhon district, Samut Sakhon province. It is a class 1 railway station and is located on the west bank of the Tha Chin River. As there is no bridge connecting the two separate sections of the Maeklong Railway, passengers continuing onwards in either direction must use a ferry to cross to Mahachai railway station on the opposite side of the river. Currently, eight rail services operate at the station.

The area beside the station, next to the Tha Chin River, is a mangrove forest and a habitat for schools of mudskippers.

== History ==
The station opened on 10 June 1905 during the reign of King Chulalongkorn, as part of the Ban Laem – Maeklong railway line operated by the Tachin Railway Ltd.

In 2014, wooden sleepers were still used on this section of track near the station, unlike other lines that had been upgraded to concrete. This railway was unique in being a stand-alone line, disconnected from the national rail network.

Back when Rama II Road had not yet opened, the area around the station was full of grocery shops and eateries serving passengers. Today, they remain in a state of limbo.

While the surrounding businesses have faded, the station has shifted its focus to tourism, welcoming visitors from Thailand and abroad. A few of the carriages display painted words reading "เมืองสายน้ำ สามเวลา" ("City of Three Tides"), a poetic reference to Samut Songkhram, the railway's final destination.
