= Maeklong railway station =

Railway station in Samut Songkhram, Thailand

Coordinates: 13.4075°N 99.9984°E

Maeklong แม่กลอง
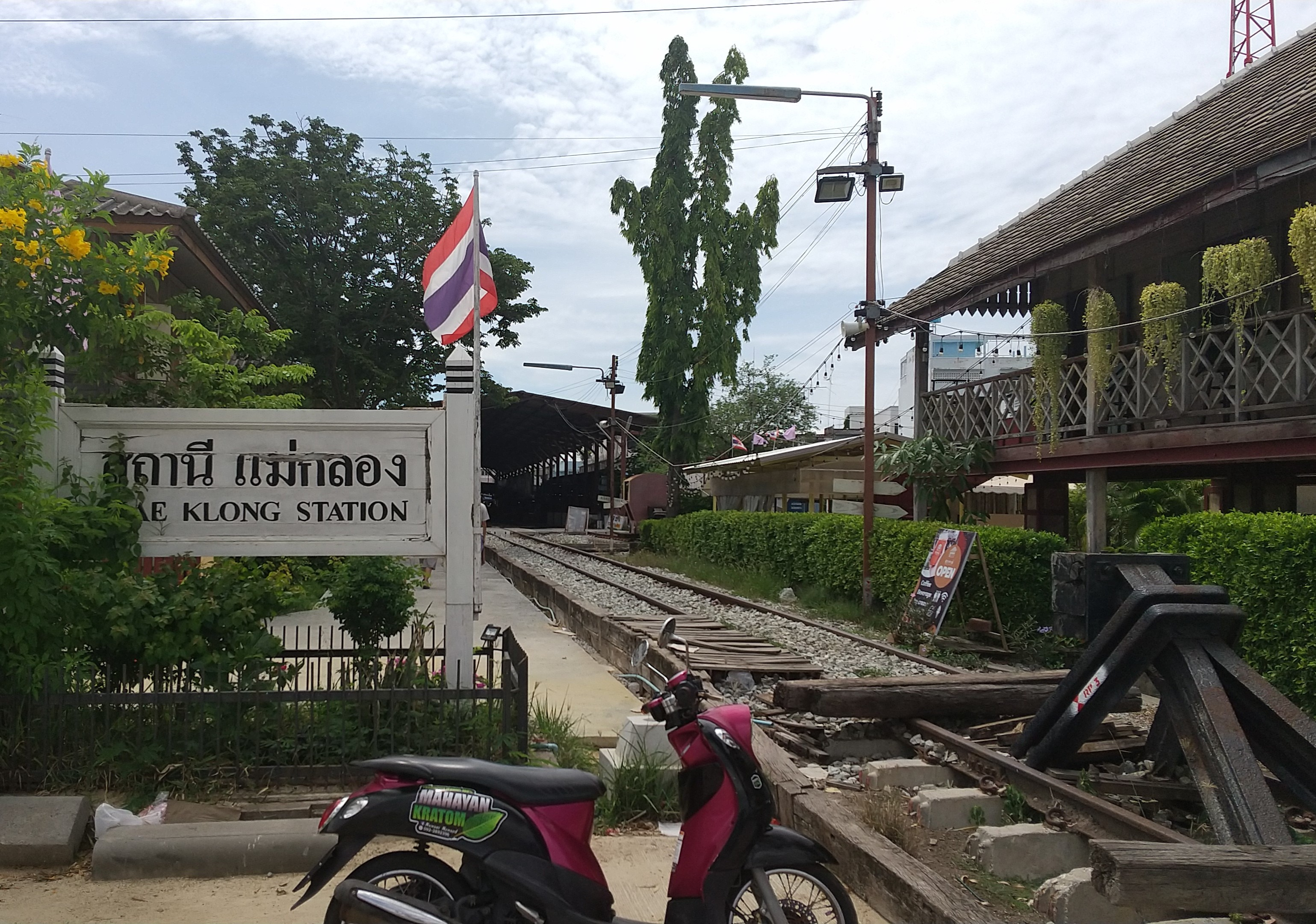

General information
- Location: Phet Samut Road, Maeklong subdistrict, Mueang Samut Songkhram district, Samut Songkhram province
- Owner: State Railway of Thailand
- Line: Maeklong Railway (Ban Laem–Maeklong Line)
- Platforms: 2
- Tracks: 2

Other information
- Station code: แอ.

History
- Opened: 10 June 1905

Services
Preceding station	State Railway of Thailand	Following station
Terminus	Maeklong Railway Ban Laem–Maeklong	Lad Yai Halt towards Ban Laem
Location

Maeklong railway station is a railway station located in Maeklong subdistrict, Mueang Samut Songkhram district, Samut Songkhram province. It is a class 1 railway station and is located on the east bank of the Maeklong River. It is the main railway station of Samut Songkhram province. Currently, 8 rail services operate at the station.

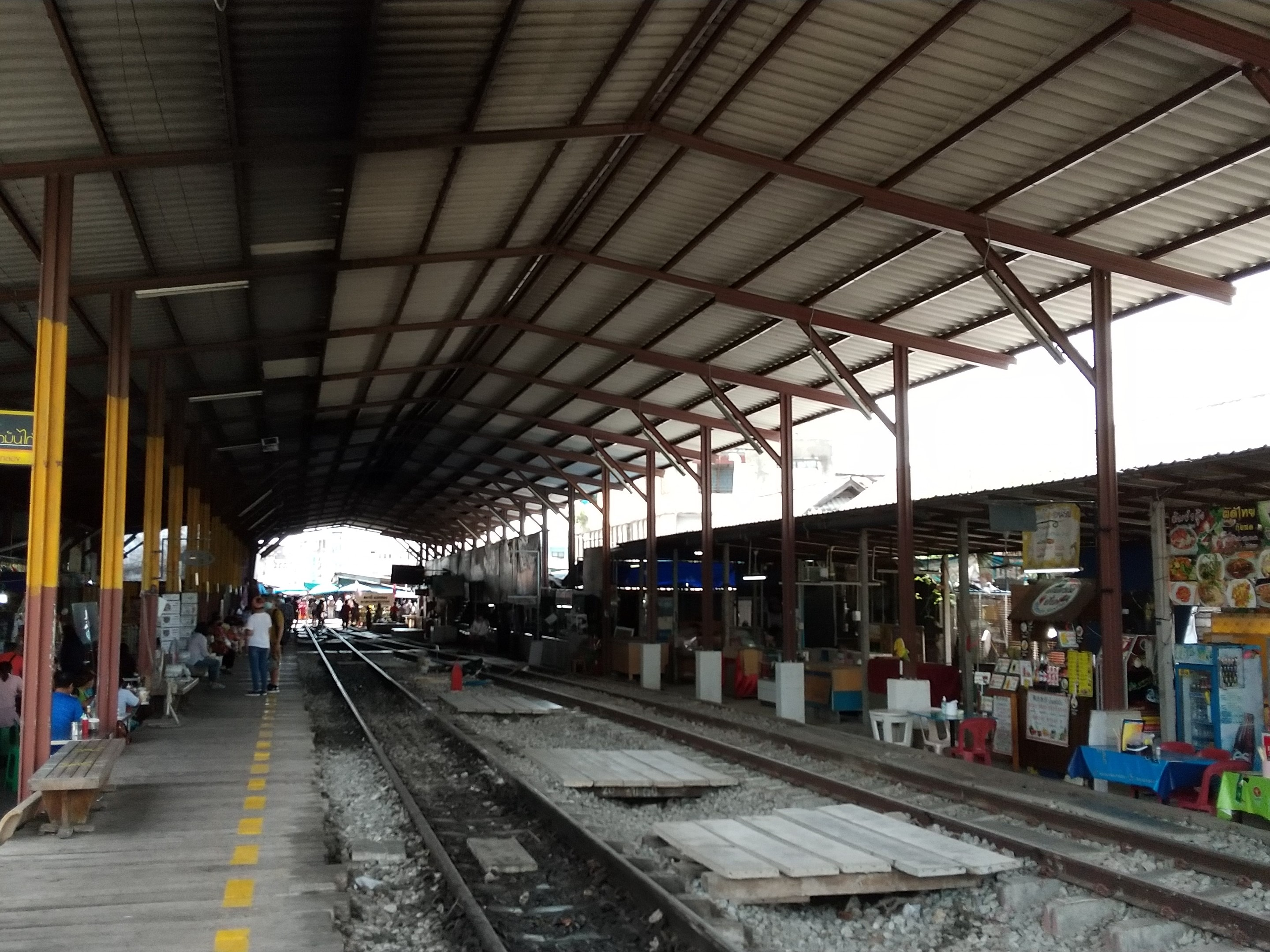
Station shed

Maeklong Railway Market (Talat Rom Hup) is located to the east of the railway station.

== History ==
The station opened on 10 June 1905 during the reign of King Chulalongkorn, as part of the Ban Laem – Maeklong railway line operated by the Tachin Railway Ltd.
