= Maeklong Railway =

Railway in Thailand

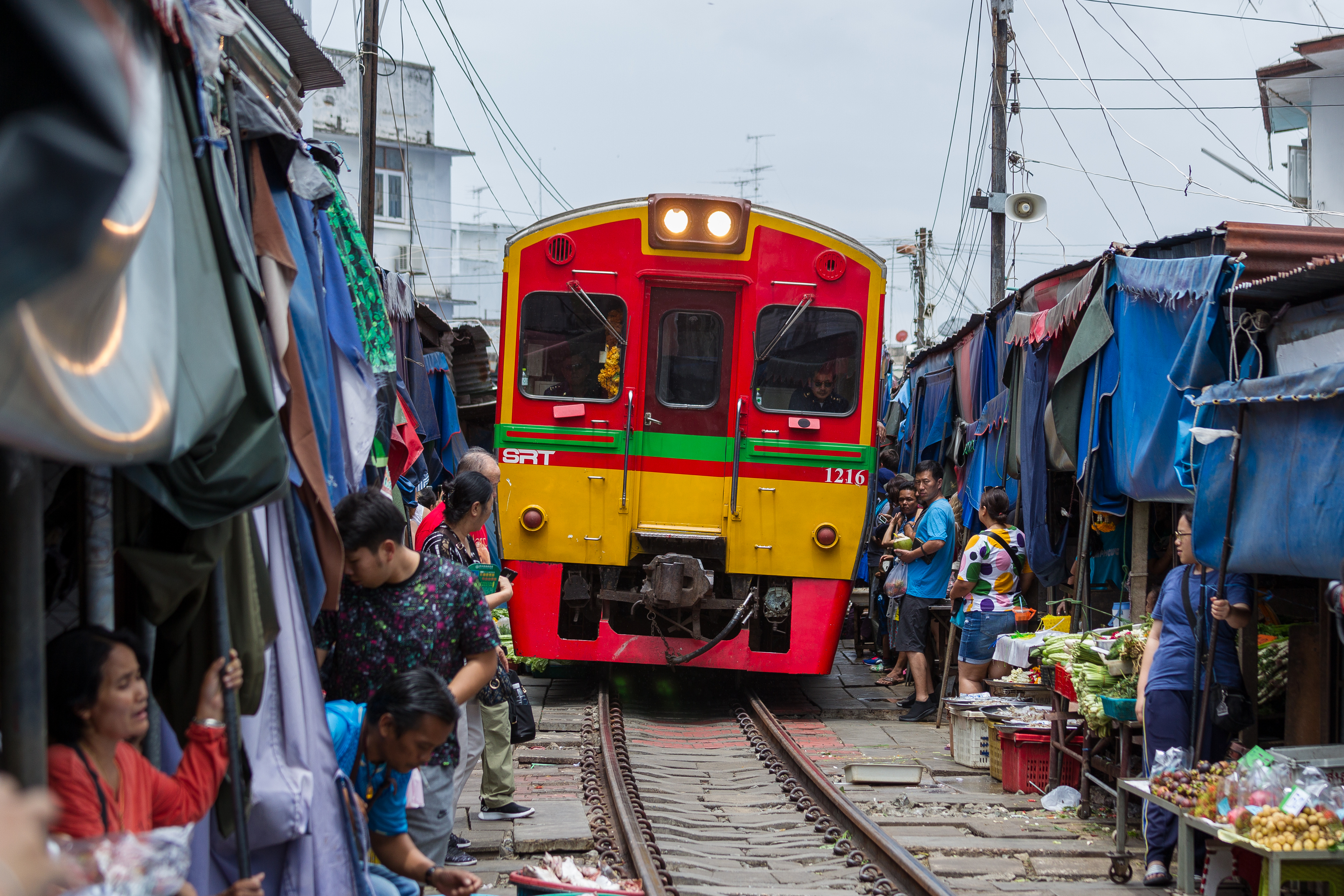
- A train passes through Talat Rom Hup

Overview
- Other name: Mae Klong Railway
- Status: Operational
- Owner: Government of Thailand
- Locale: Central Thailand
- Termini: Wongwian Yai Mahachai; Ban Laem Maeklong
- Connecting lines: Mahachai Line; Ban Laem Line
- Stations: 35

Service
- Type: Commuter rail
- Services: 2
- Operator(s): State Railway of Thailand
- Depot(s): Mahachai
- Rolling stock: SRT NKF class

History
- Opened: 1901

Technical
- Line length: 66.9 km (41.6 mi)
- Number of tracks: 1
- Track gauge: 1,000 mm (3 ft 3 3/8 in) metre gauge
- Electrification: 600 V DC overhead line (1926–1955)
- Operating speed: 31 km/h (19 mph)

The Maeklong Railway (also known as the Mae Klong Railway) is a 1,000 mm (3 ft 3 3/8 in) metre gauge railway that runs for nearly 65 kilometres (40 mi) between Wongwian Yai, Bangkok, and Samut Songkhram in central Thailand.

The railway became famous for its route through the Maeklong Railway Market, nicknamed (Thai: ตลาดร่มหุบ; RTGS: Talat Rom Hup), meaning the "umbrella pulldown market". It is one of the largest fresh seafood markets in Thailand and is centered on the Maeklong Railway's track. Whenever a train approaches, the awnings and shop fronts are moved back from the rails, to be replaced once the train has passed.

== Route description ==
The line consists of two sections: the eastern Mahachai Line, which runs between Samut Sakhon and Wongwian Yai with 20 stations, and the Ban Laem Line, which runs between Samut Sakhon and Samut Songkhram with 15 stations. The Tha Chin River at Samut Sakhon separates the two stretches. The only connection between the stations on the opposite sides of the river is by boat.

== History ==
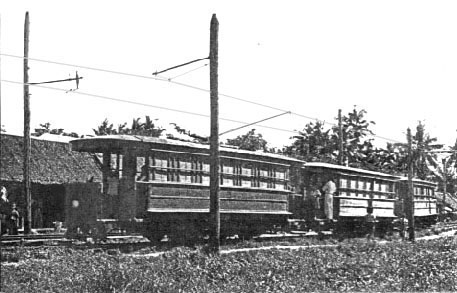
The eastern section of the line when it was electrified

The Mae Klong Railway was built in two separate stages. The Tachin Railway Ltd, founded in 1901 with a concession from the crown of Thailand to construct a line to Samut Sakhon from Bangkok, built the 33 kilometer Mahachai Line; it opened in 1904 with eight stations. A year later, The Maeklong Railway Company opened the 34-kilometer Ban Laem Line, using three steam locomotives. The lines merged in 1907 to form the Maeklong Railway Ltd. It was originally opened as a goods line, transporting produce from the fishing ports of Samut Sakhon and Samut Songkram to the Bangkok markets. The Government of Thailand purchased the now-merged company in 1926 and electrified the eastern section, turning it into an interurban tramway. The Thai military later gained control of the railway in 1942, during World War II, and the line was brought under the control of the State Railway of Thailand in 1952 and fully merged into it by 1955. During this period of merger, the electrification was removed from the eastern section, with steam-hauled and later diesel-hauled trains replacing the old tramcars in 1959. In 1961 the line's original terminus at Pak Khlong San was closed and replaced with a bus stop, to ease traffic congestion in Bangkok, with Wongwian Yai becoming the new terminus.

== Services ==
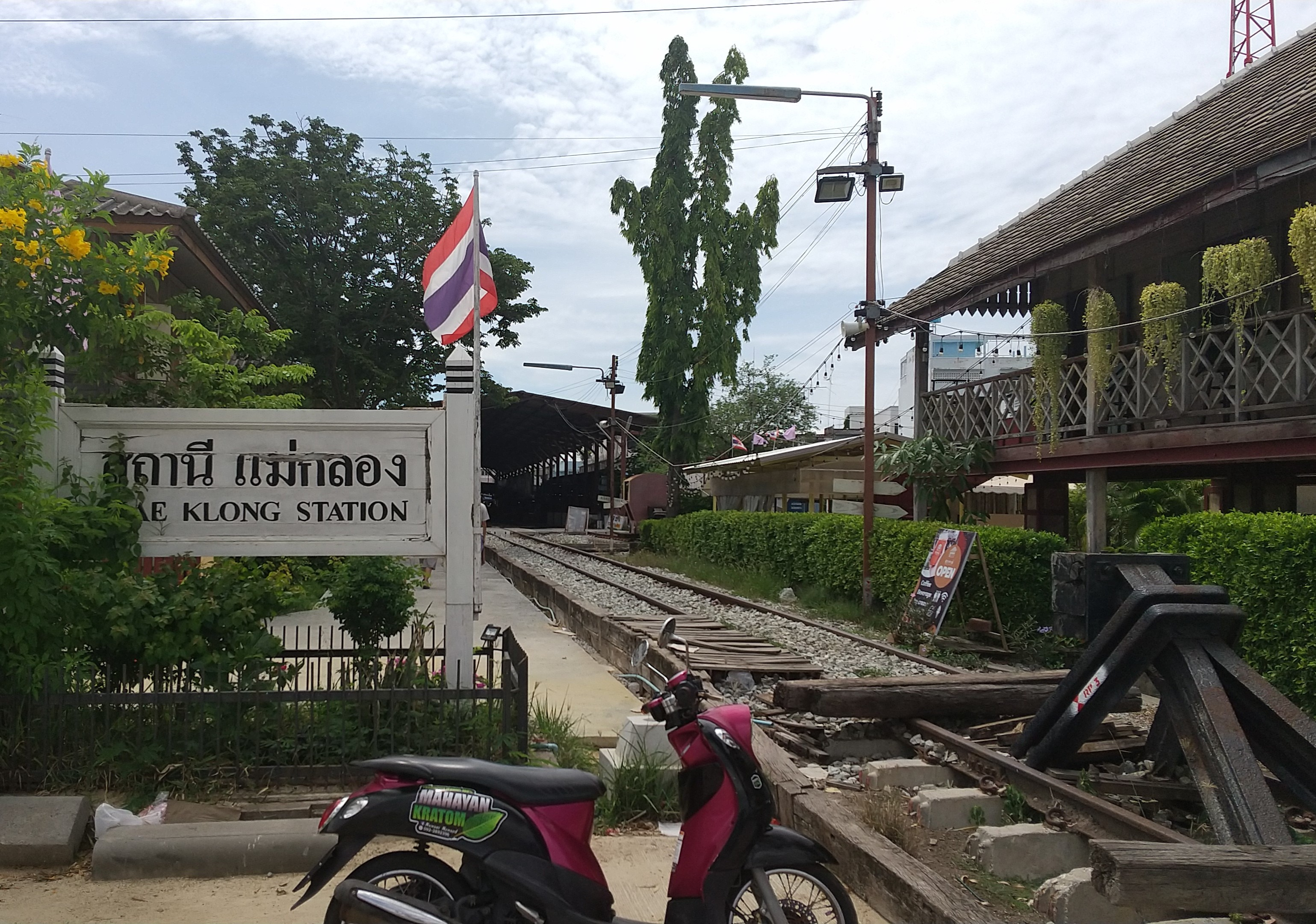
Maeklong station, where the line ends

Seventeen trains run daily in each direction between Wongwian Yai and Mahachai. Four trains run daily between Ban Laem and Maeklong. The railway is one of the slowest in Thailand, and the average speed for the whole line is only 30 kmph. There are no signals on the line.

== Rolling stock ==
The Maeklong Railway's first trains were hauled by three 0-4-2T wood-burning tank engines, purchased from Krauss Locomotive Works in 1903 and 1906. Consists of electric tramcars worked passenger services on the eastern section of the line from about 1927 up until the line's de-electrification in 1955, initially being replaced with conventional trains hauled by two Henschel 4-6-2 steam engines. A pair of Henschel 440 hp 2-6-2 diesel locomotives were introduced not long after in 1957, but these were not regarded as a success; the railway did not retire steam traction until 1971, when the older but more reliable Sulzer types of diesel, among the first used by the SRT, were cascaded down to the Maeklong Railway with the arrival of more modern locomotives on the main network. Since at least 1975, the Maeklong Railway has operated relatively modern diesel multiple unit trains.

== Stations ==
English name	Thai Name	Code	Distance in km	Class	Thai abbr.	Note	Location
Pak Khlong San	ปากคลองสาน		-1.90			Closed since 1961	Bangkok
Wongwian Yai	วงเวียนใหญ่	5001	0.00	1	งญ.		Bangkok
Talat Phlu	ตลาดพลู	5003	1.78	2	ลู.		Bangkok
Wutthakat	วุฒากาศ	5036	2.45	Halt	-	Opened 23 October 2020. Interchange to BTS Silom Line.	Bangkok
Khlong Ton Sai	คลองต้นไทร	5004	3.35	Halt	ไซ.		Bangkok
Chom Thong	จอมทอง	5005	4.13	Halt	ทจ.		Bangkok
Wat Sai	วัดไทร	5007	5.76	Halt	วซ.		Bangkok
Wat Sing	วัดสิงห์	5008	7.15	2	สิ.		Bangkok
Bang Bon	บางบอน	5009	9.76	Halt	าา.		Bangkok
Kan Kheha	การเคหะ	5010	12.23	Halt	เค.		Bangkok
Rang Sakae	รางสะแก	5011	12.53	Halt	รแ.	No station structure	Bangkok
Rang Pho	รางโพธิ์	5012	14.25	2	รโ.		Bangkok
Sam Yaek	สามแยก	5013	15.83	Halt	แย.		Bangkok
Phrom Daen	พรมแดน	5014	17.29	Halt	พแ.		Bangkok–Samut Sakhon border
Thung Si Thong	ทุ่งสีทอง	5034	18.76	Halt	ที.		Samut Sakhon
Bang Nam Chuet	บางน้ำจืด	5015	19.97	Halt	นจ.		Samut Sakhon
Khok Khwai	คอกควาย	5016	22.99	Halt	วา.		Samut Sakhon
Ban Khom	บ้านขอม	5017	26.76	Halt	ขม.		Samut Sakhon
Khlong Chak	คลองจาก	5033	29.76	Halt	ลจ.		Samut Sakhon
Nikhom Rotfai Mahachai	นิคมรถไฟมหาชัย	5037	30.60	Halt	-		Samut Sakhon
Mahachai	มหาชัย	5018	31.22	1	ชั.		Samut Sakhon
Tha Chin River
Ban Laem	บ้านแหลม	5019	0.18	3	แห.		Samut Sakhon
Tha Chalom City Hospital	โรงพยาบาลนครท่าฉลอม	-	0.56	Halt	-	Opened November 2021	Samut Sakhon
Tha Chalom	ท่าฉลอม	5020	1.24	Halt	ฉอ.		Samut Sakhon
Ban Chi Phakhao	บ้านชีผ้าขาว	5021	3.89	Halt	ผา.		Samut Sakhon
Khlong Nok Lek	คลองนกเล็ก	5035	5.95	Halt	ลเ.		Samut Sakhon
Bang Si Kot	บางสีคต	5022	6.90	Halt	บี.		Samut Sakhon
Bang Krachao	บางกระเจ้า	5023	8.86	Halt	ะจ.		Samut Sakhon
Ban Bo	บ้านบ่อ	5024	10.90	Halt	บ่.		Samut Sakhon
Bang Thorat	บางโทรัด	5025	13.32	Halt	งโ.		Samut Sakhon
Ban Kalong	บ้านกาหลง	5026	15.78	Halt	กห.		Samut Sakhon
Ban Na Khwang	บ้านนาขวาง	5027	17.94	Halt	บ้.		Samut Sakhon
Ban Na Khok	บ้านนาโคก	5028	19.97	Halt	าโ.		Samut Sakhon
Khet Mueang	เขตเมือง	5029	23.73	Halt	ดเ.		Samut Sakhon
Lad Yai	ลาดใหญ่	5030	27.66	Halt	ลญ.		Samut Songkhram
Bang Krabun	บางกระบูน	5031	30.16	Halt	กู.	Closed	Samut Songkhram
Maeklong	แม่กลอง	5032	33.75	3	แอ.		Samut Songkhram

== See also ==
- Rail transport in Thailand
- Greater Bangkok commuter rail
- SRT Red Lines
- Hanoi Train Street, a rail section in Hanoi with similar scenery to Maeklong Railway Market
- Molli railway, another narrow-gauge railway notable for street-running
