= Wongwian Yai station =

Railway station in Bangkok, Thailand

Wongwian Yai วงเวียนใหญ่
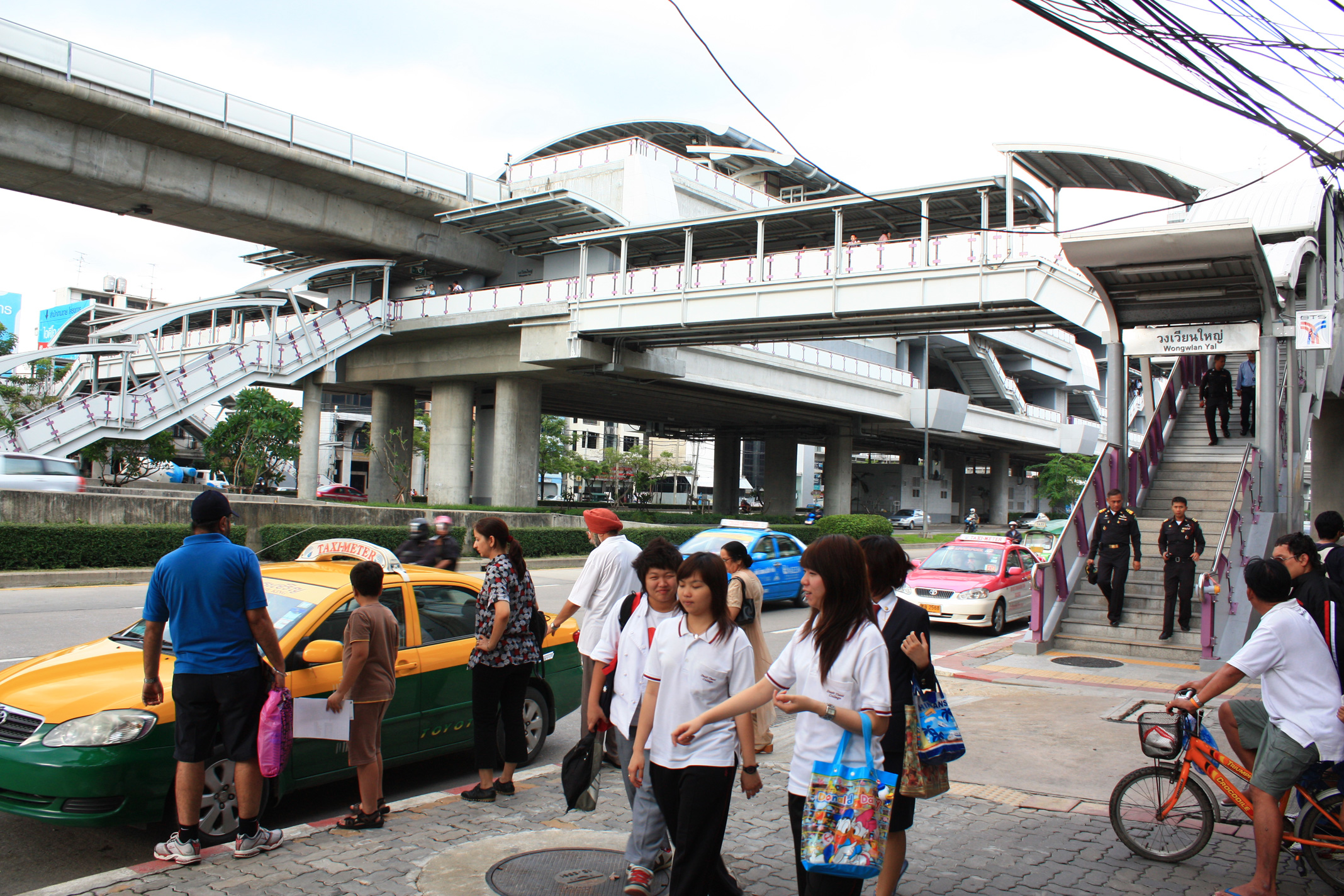

General information
- Location: Khlong San; Bangkok; Thailand
- Coordinates: 13°43′16″N 100°29′43″E
- System: BTS
- Owner: Bangkok Metropolitan Administration (BMA)
- Operator: Bangkok Mass Transit System Public Company Limited (BTSC)

Other information
- Station code: S8

History
- Opened: 15 May 2009; 17 years ago
- Former names: Yaek Taksin

Passengers
- 2021: 1,490,293

Services
| Preceding station | BTS Skytrain | Following station |
|---|---|---|
| Krung Thon Buri towards National Stadium | Silom Line | Pho Nimit towards Bang Wa |
Location

วงเวียนใหญ่ PP25 Wongwian Yai

General information
- Location: Thon Buri, Bangkok, Thailand
- Coordinates: 13°43′25.5″N 100°29′31.6″E
- System: | MRT
- Owner: Mass Rapid Transit Authority of Thailand
- Operator: Bangkok Expressway and Metro Public Company Limited
- Line: Purple Line
- Platforms: 2 (1 island platform)
- Tracks: 2
- Connections: Bus, Taxi, State Railway of Thailand

Construction
- Structure type: Underground
- Accessible: Yes

Other information
- Station code: PP25

History
- Opened: 2027; 1 year's time

Services
| Preceding station | Metropolitan Rapid Transit | Following station |
|---|---|---|
| Memorial Bridge towards Tao Poon | Purple Line Southern Extension | Somdech Phra Pinklao Hospital towards Khru Nai |
Location

Wongwian Yai (SRT) วงเวียนใหญ่ (รฟท.)
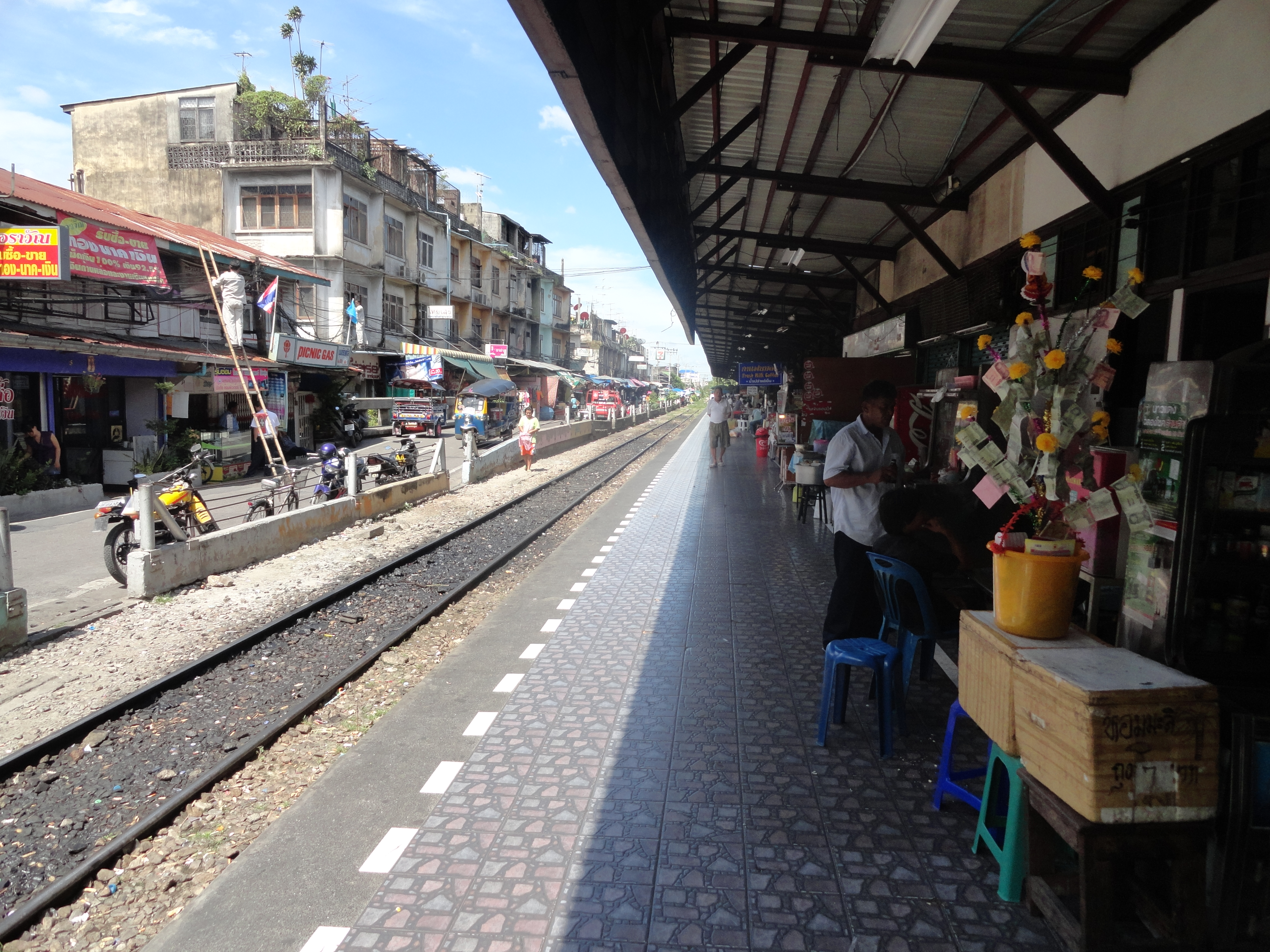

General information
- Location: Somdet Phrachao Taksin Road, Bang Yi Ruea subdistrict, Thon Buri district Bangkok; Thailand
- Operator: State Railway of Thailand
- Line: Mahachai Line
- Platforms: 1
- Tracks: 1
- Connections: BMTA / Private Jointed Bus; Taxis / Motorcycle taxi

Construction
- Structure type: At-grade

Other information
- Station code: งญ.
- Classification: Class 1

History
- Opened: 29 December 1904
- Original company: Tachin Railway Ltd.

Services
| Preceding station | State Railway of Thailand | Following station |
|---|---|---|
| Talat Phlu towards Mahachai | Maeklong Railway Wongwian Yai–Mahachai | Terminus |
Location

Wongwian Yai Station Traditional sign

Wongwian Yai station (Thai: สถานีวงเวียนใหญ่, pronounced [sā.tʰǎː.nīː wōŋ.wīa̯n jàj]) is the name of a cluster of railway and rapid transit stations in Bangkok, near the Wongwian Yai traffic circle. It includes the existing terminus of the State Railway of Thailand's Maeklong Railway and an elevated station on the BTS Skytrain's Silom Line, as well as an under-construction underground station of the MRT Purple Line, planned to open in 2028, and a planned station of the SRT Dark Red Line, which will replace the old railway station.

The Wongwian Yai (SRT) station is a railway station located in Bang Yi Ruea subdistrict, Thon Buri district. It is a class 1 railway station and is the Bangkok terminus of the Maeklong Railway Mahachai Line. Currently, 34 rail services operate at the station. It is located closer to the titular Wongwian Yai roundabout than the Silom Line station. Wongwian Yai is the main station used for rail passenger traffic from Samut Sakhon and Samut Songkhram provinces.

The Silom Line station is on Krung Thon Buri Road to the west of Taksin intersection in Khlong San District, Bangkok. It was opened on 15 May 2009, together with Krung Thon Buri station on the 2.2 km (1.4 mi) being the first two rapid transit stations in Thonburi, the west bank of the Chao Phraya River.

== History ==
The station opened on 29 December 1904 during the reign of King Chulalongkorn, as part of the Pak Khlong San–Mahachai railway operated by the Tachin Railway Ltd. On 24 November 1959, Prime Minister Sarit Thanarat suggested to the cabinet that the Pak Khlong San–Wongwian Yai section be closed in order to accommodate the increase in road traffic. The station became the line's terminus following the closure of Pak Khlong San railway station, on 1 January 1961, with the Pak Khlong San–Wongwian Yai section converted into Charoen Rat Road.

On 22 March 2019, a train collided with the buffer stop at Wongwian Yai station due to an air brake failure. Two people were injured.

== Station layout ==
=== BTS station ===
| U3; Platform | Side platform, doors will open on the left |
| U3; Platform | Platform 4 | Silom Line toward National Stadium (Krung Thon Buri) |
| U3; Platform | Platform 3 | Silom Line toward Bang Wa (Pho Nimit) |
| U3; Platform | Side platform, doors will open on the left |
| U2 ticket sales class | ticket sales floor | Exit 1–4, Passenger Service Center; Ticket Office, Ticket Machine, Shop |
| G Street level | - | Bus Stop; Wongwian Yai Market, Wongwian Yai Railway Station |

== See also ==
- BTS Skytrain
- Wongwian Yai
- MRT Purple Line
- SRT Dark Red Line
