= Mahachai railway station =

Railway station in Samut Sakhon, Thailand

Coordinates: 13.5461°N 100.2764°E

Mahachai มหาชัย
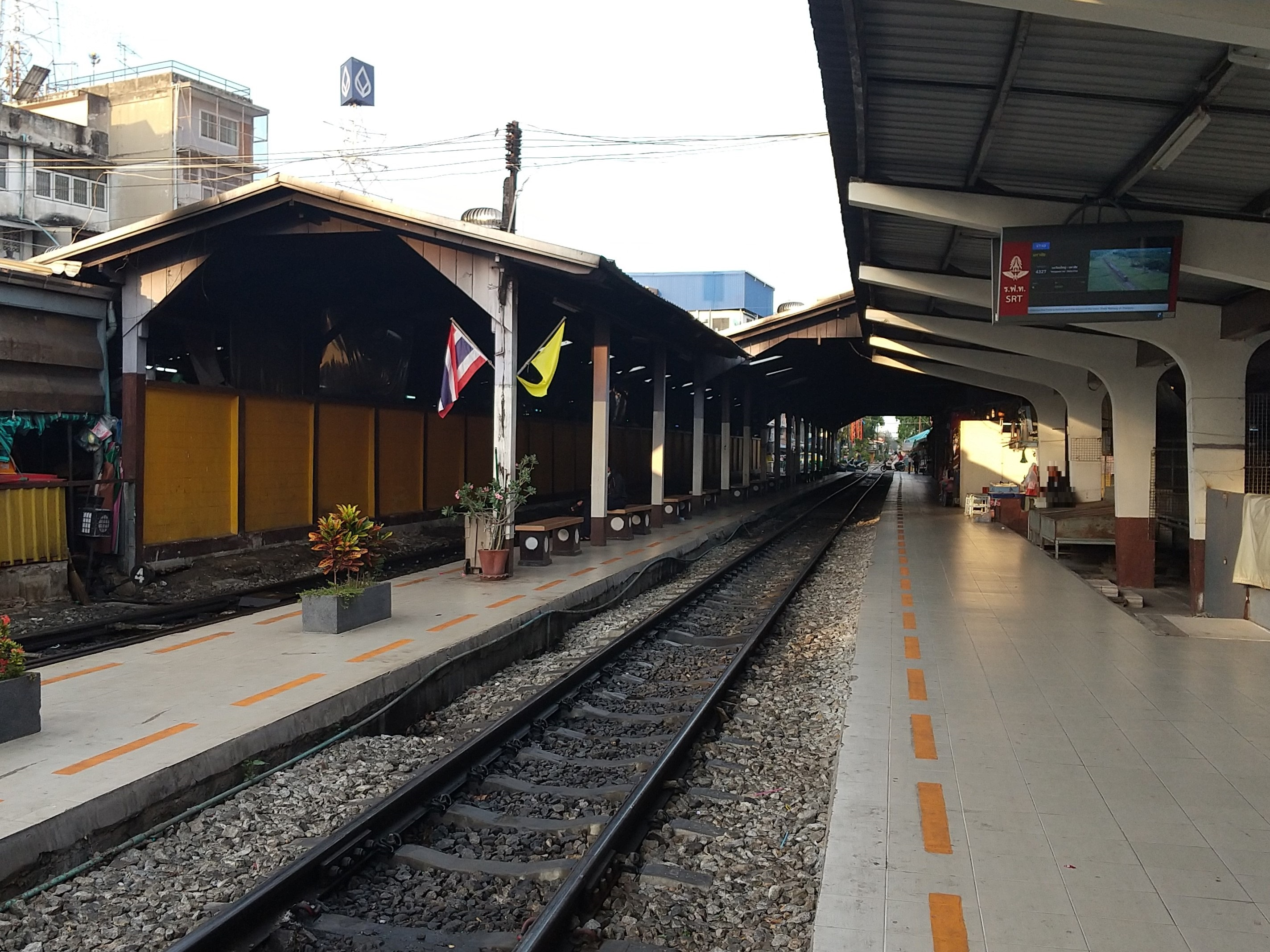
- Railway platforms in 2023

General information
- Location: Sukhaphiban Road, Mahachai subdistrict, Mueang Samut Sakhon district Samut Sakhon province Thailand
- Operator: State Railway of Thailand
- Line: Mahachai Line
- Platforms: 2
- Tracks: 2
- Connections: Mahachai–Ban Laem Ferry

Construction
- Structure type: At-grade

Other information
- Station code: ชั.
- Classification: Class 1

History
- Opened: 29 December 1904
- Original company: Tachin Railway Ltd.

Services
Preceding station	State Railway of Thailand	Following station
Terminus	Maeklong Railway Wongwian Yai–Mahachai	Nikhom Rotfai Mahachai Halt towards Wongwian Yai
Location

Mahachai railway station is a railway station located in Mahachai subdistrict, Mueang Samut Sakhon district, Samut Sakhon province. It is a class 1 railway station and is the main railway station of Samut Sakhon. As there is no bridge connecting the two separate sections of the Maeklong Railway, passengers continuing onwards in either direction must use a ferry to cross to Ban Laem railway station on the opposite side of the Tha Chin River. Currently, 34 rail services operate at the station.

== History ==
The station opened on 29 December 1904 during the reign of King Chulalongkorn, as part of the Pak Khlong San–Mahachai railway operated by the Tachin Railway Ltd.

== Gallery ==
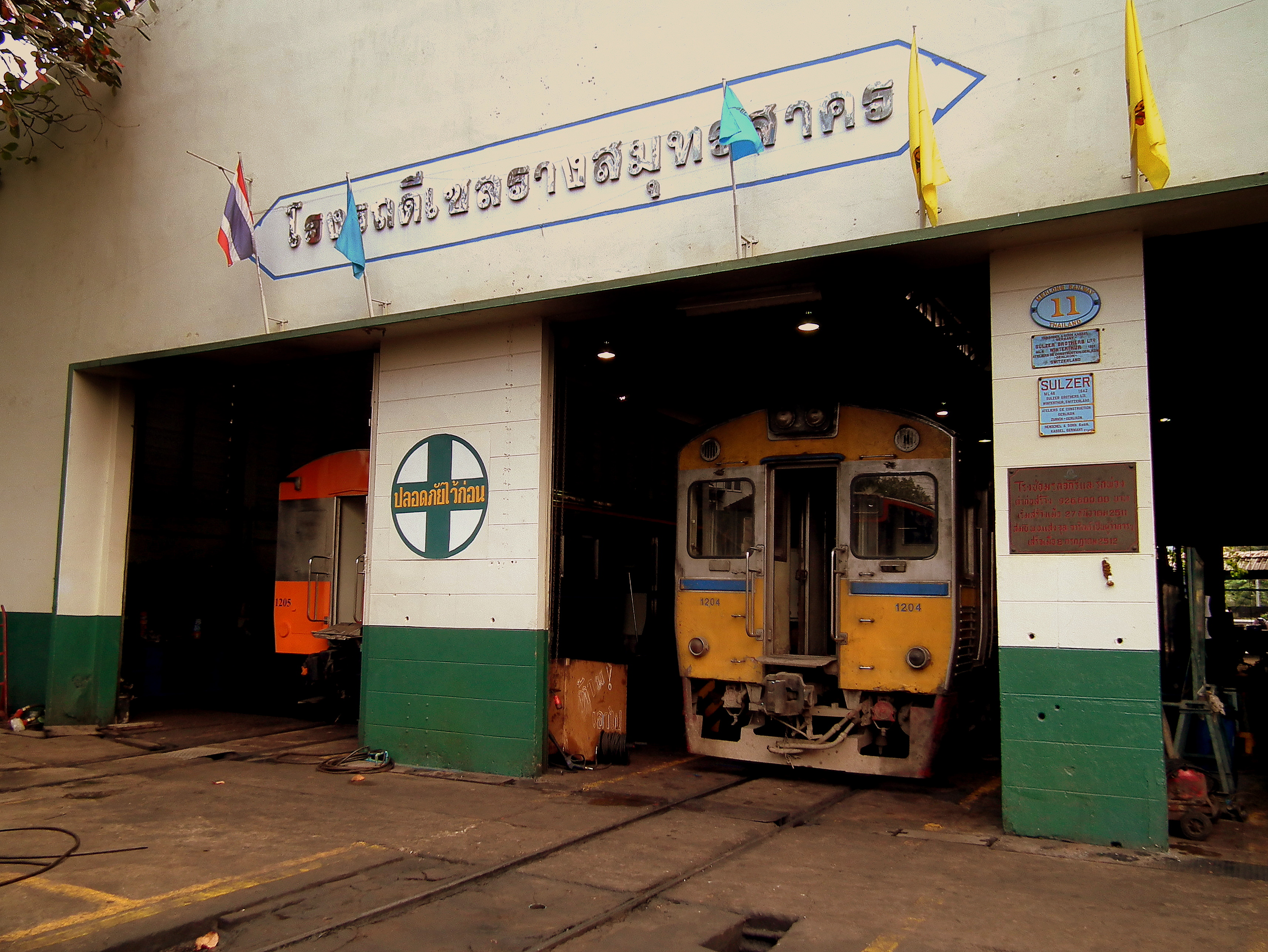
Samut Sakhon Diesel Railcar Depot

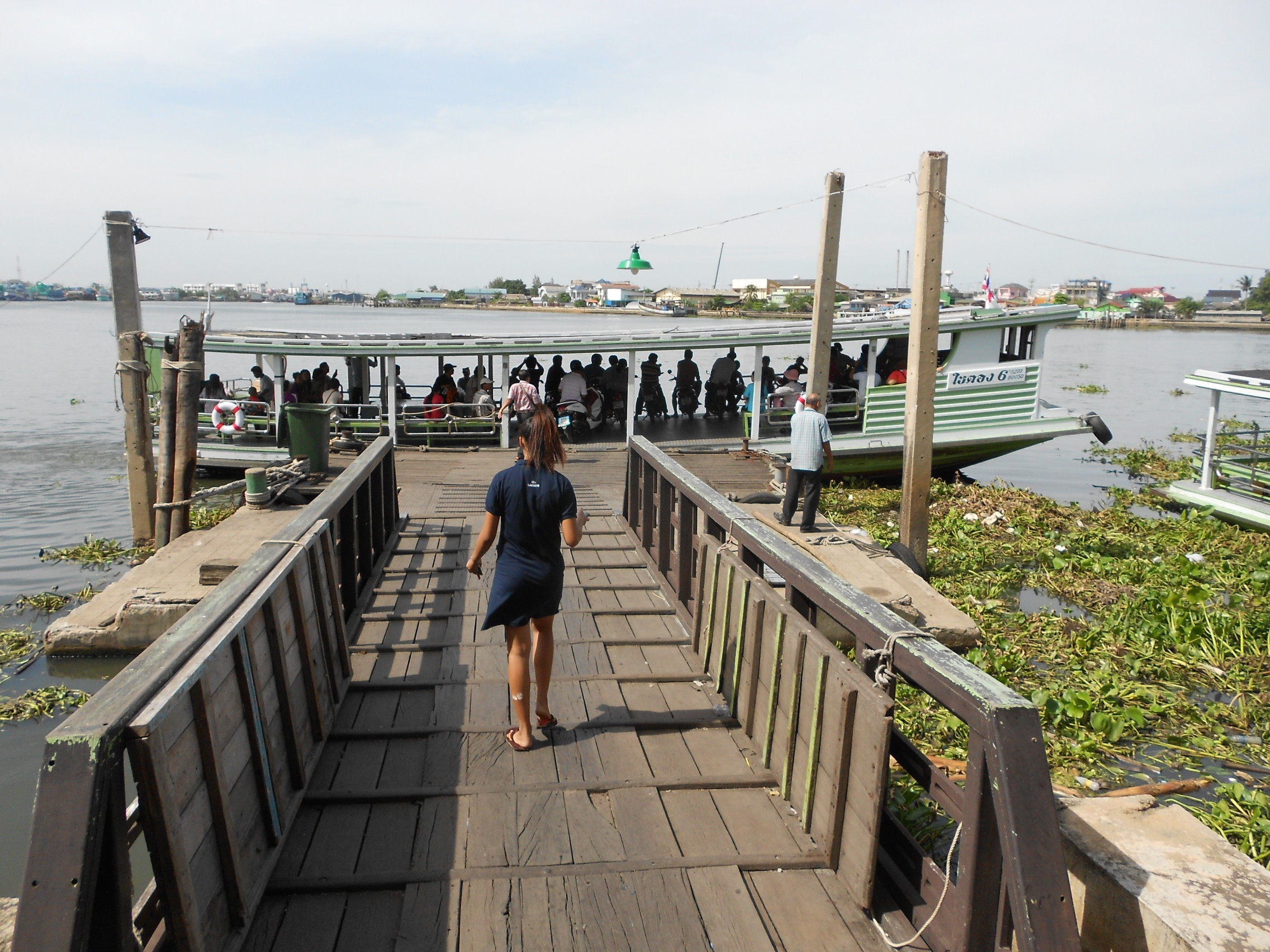
Tha Chin River Ferry Terminal at Mahachai
