= Kotchakorn Voraakhom =

Thai architect

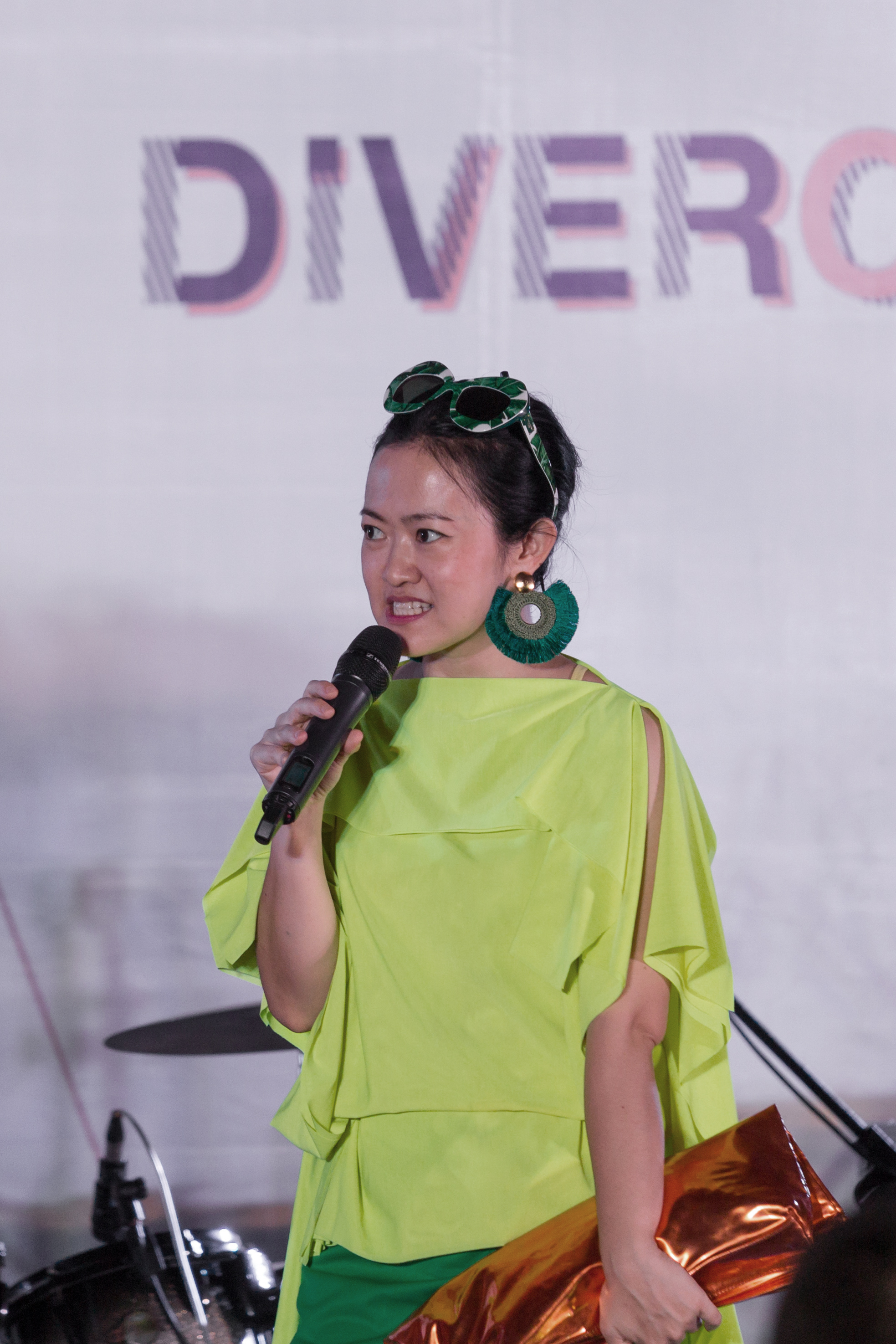
- Born: 1978 (age 47–48)
- Education: Harvard Graduate School of Design; Faculty of Architecture, Chulalongkorn University
- Occupation: Architect
- Awards: TED fellow
- Buildings: Chulalongkorn University Centenary Park; Siam Green Sky at Siam Square One
- Projects: Phra Pok Klao Skypark; Thammasat University Park

Kotchakorn Voraakhom (Thai: กชกร วรอาคม, born 1978) is a Thai landscape architect and chief executive officer of Porous City Network, a social enterprise that looks to increase urban resilience in Southeast Asia. She is also the founder of the Kounkuey Design Initiative, which works with communities to rebuild public spaces. She campaigns for more green space in cities and is a 2018 TED fellow.

== Education ==
Voraakhom loved the flooding in Thailand as a child. She studied at Chulalongkorn University. She earned her bachelor's degree in landscape architecture in 2001, when she was awarded a medal for exceptional academic performance. She completed her graduate studies at Harvard University. During graduate school she co-founded the Koungkuey Design Initiative (KDI), a nonprofit design organisation that helps communities develop their neighbourhoods. She returned to Thailand in 2006.

== Career ==
Kotchakorn has taught landscape design at Chulalongkorn University since 2010. She is founder and chief executive at Landprocess, a landscape architecture firm in Bangkok. She has been named one of Thailand's best architects, one who is fostering social change. In 2015 Kotchakorn worked on the Thailand Pavilion at the Milan Expo. The pavilion showcases the role of water in Thai agriculture. She was awarded a fellowship from The Asia Foundation in 2016. She opened the Siam Green Sky roof garden in Siam Square in 2015.

In 2017, she founded the Porous City Network. Bangkok, a city of over eight million people, is only 1.5 metres above sea level. One of her goals is to increase Bangkok's resilience to climate change, especially flooding, and, to this end, she has received fellowships from Echoing Green and the Equity Initiative. In a TED talk on 11 February 2019, on how to transform sinking cities into landscapes that fight floods, Kotchakorn states that this project was not to get rid of flooding but it is to live with flooding as flooding is Thailand's new norm. She won a Chulalongkorn University design competition for a park that increases urban resilience by capturing runoff, the 28 rai (4.5 ha; 11 acres) Chulalongkorn University Centenary Park. The park is built on a three degree incline and contains artificial wetlands and underground cisterns that can hold one million gallons (3.8 million litres) of water. Kotchakorn was inspired by King Bhumibol Adulyadej's concept of creating kaem ling, 'monkey cheeks', to capture rainwater runoff for later use. In 2019, she opened a 91 rai (14.6 ha; 36 acres) park at Thammasat University. In 2021, Landprocess-designed Chong Nonsi Canal Park opened.

In December 2019, Thammasat University's Rangsit campus opened Asia's largest urban rooftop garden. The 7,000 m^{2} space designed by Kotchakorn is intended to help offset some of the impacts of climate change, such as flooding.

== Accolades ==
In 2018, Kotchakorn was named a TED fellow. She has written for City Green. She was part of the 2018 Global Entrepreneurship Bootcamp. In 2019, Kotchakorn was one of three Thais named by Time on its "Time 100 Next 2019" list. She was listed under the category of "Innovator". The following year she was on the list of the BBC's 100 Women announced on 23 November 2020. In 2020, The United Nations honored her as a winner of the 2020 UN Global Climate Action Awards, Women for Results.

== See also ==
- Ecological engineering
- Energy-efficient landscaping
- Urban planning
