= Chong Nonsi BTS station =

Railway station in Bangkok, Thailand

Chong Nonsi ช่องนนทรี
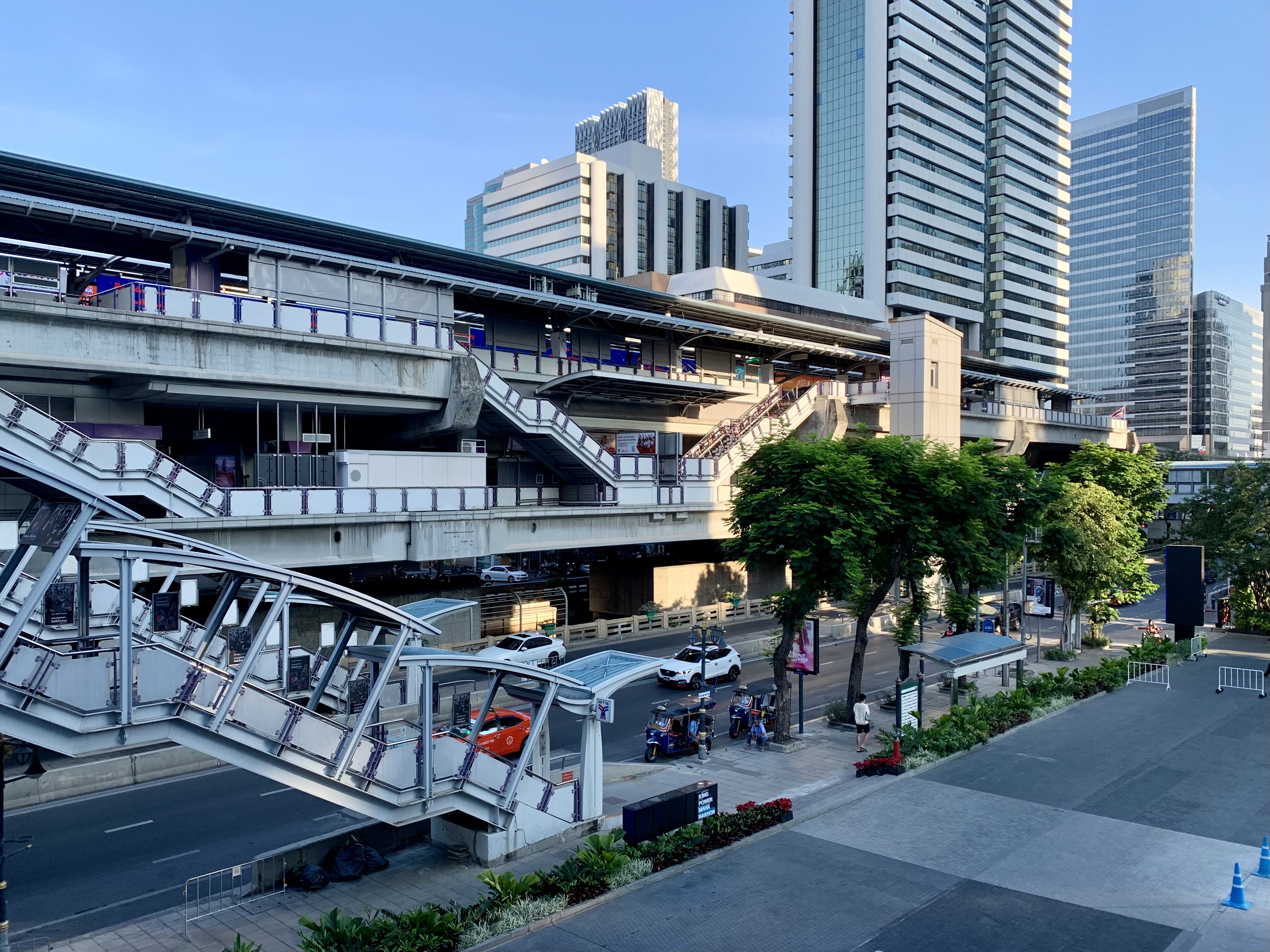
- Chong Nonsi Station in December 2020

General information
- Location: Bang Rak; Bangkok; Thailand
- Coordinates: 13°43′25.63″N 100°31′46.00″E
- Owner: Bangkok Metropolitan Administration (BMA); BTS Rail Mass Transit Growth Infrastructure Fund (BTSGIF)
- Operator: Bangkok Mass Transit System Public Company Limited (BTSC)
- Line: Silom Line

Construction
- Structure type: Elevated

Other information
- Station code: S3

History
- Opened: 5 December 1999; 26 years ago

Passengers
- 2021: 2,710,252

Services
Preceding station	BTS Skytrain	Following station
Sala Daeng towards National Stadium	Silom Line	Saint Louis towards Bang Wa
Location

Chong Nonsi station (Thai: สถานีช่องนนทรี, pronounced [sā.tʰǎː.nīː t͡ɕʰɔ̂ŋ nōn.sīː]) is a BTS skytrain station, on the Silom line in Bang Rak District, Bangkok, Thailand. The station is located on Naradhiwas Rajanagarindra Road over the Chong Non Si Canal, beside the Tchonne river, in the heart of the Bangkok business area between Sathon and Si Lom Roads.

The station allows interchange to Sathorn station of Bangkok BRT

== Station layout ==
U3; Platform	Side platform, doors will open on the left
U3; Platform	Platform 4	Silom Line toward National Stadium (Sala Daeng)
U3; Platform	Platform 3	Silom Line toward Bang Wa (Saint Louis)
U3; Platform	Side platform, doors will open on the left
U2 ticket sales class	ticket sales floor	Exit 1–5, Passenger Service Center; Ticket Office, Ticket Machine, Shop; Skywalk to Sathorn BRT station (Bangkok BRT); Connection to King Power Mahanakhon
G Street level	-	Bus Stop; King Power Mahanakhon, Empire Tower (Bangkok), Chong Nonsi Canal Park

== Incident ==
On 2 August 2019, two bombs exploded in the vicinity of the station, one in a bush beneath Chong Nonsi BTS Station and another at the entrance of the King Power Mahanakhon Tower. The event resulted in two minor injuries and the shattering of a platform screen door on the northbound platform. Exits 3–4 in front of Mahanakhon Tower were closed, including the lift, during the investigation. The local police found the suspect object and destroyed it with a high-pressure water gun.

== Nearby landmarks ==
- King Power Mahanakhon
- Empire Tower (Bangkok)
- Chong Nonsi Canal Park

== See also ==
- BTS Skytrain
- Bangkok BRT
