= Naradhiwas Rajanagarindra Road =

Street in Bangkok, Thailand

Coordinates: 13°42′42.73″N 100°32′12.92″E

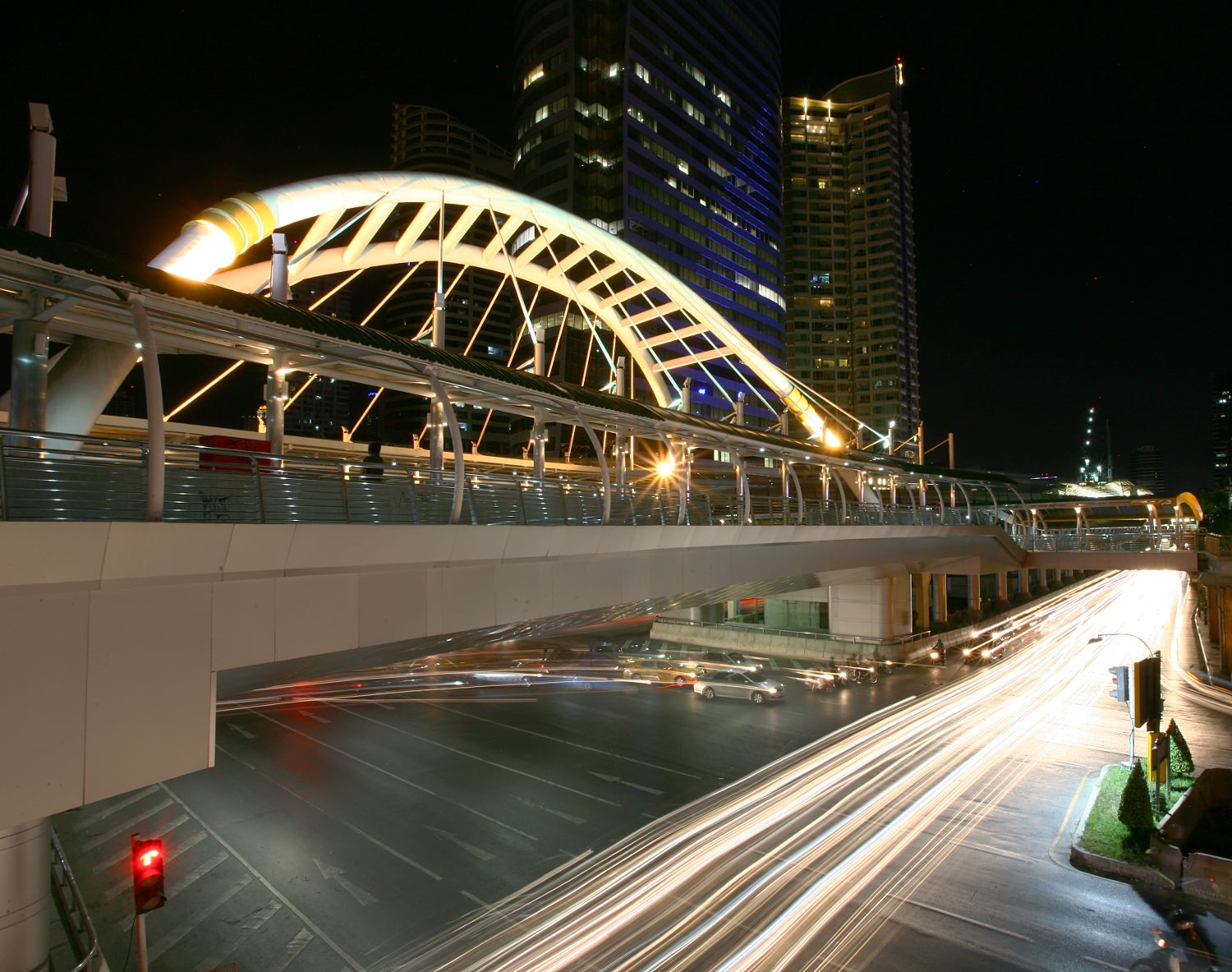
The Sathon–Naradhiwas intersection, seen from Chong Nonsi BTS Skywalk, one of Bangkok's largest and most striking landmarks

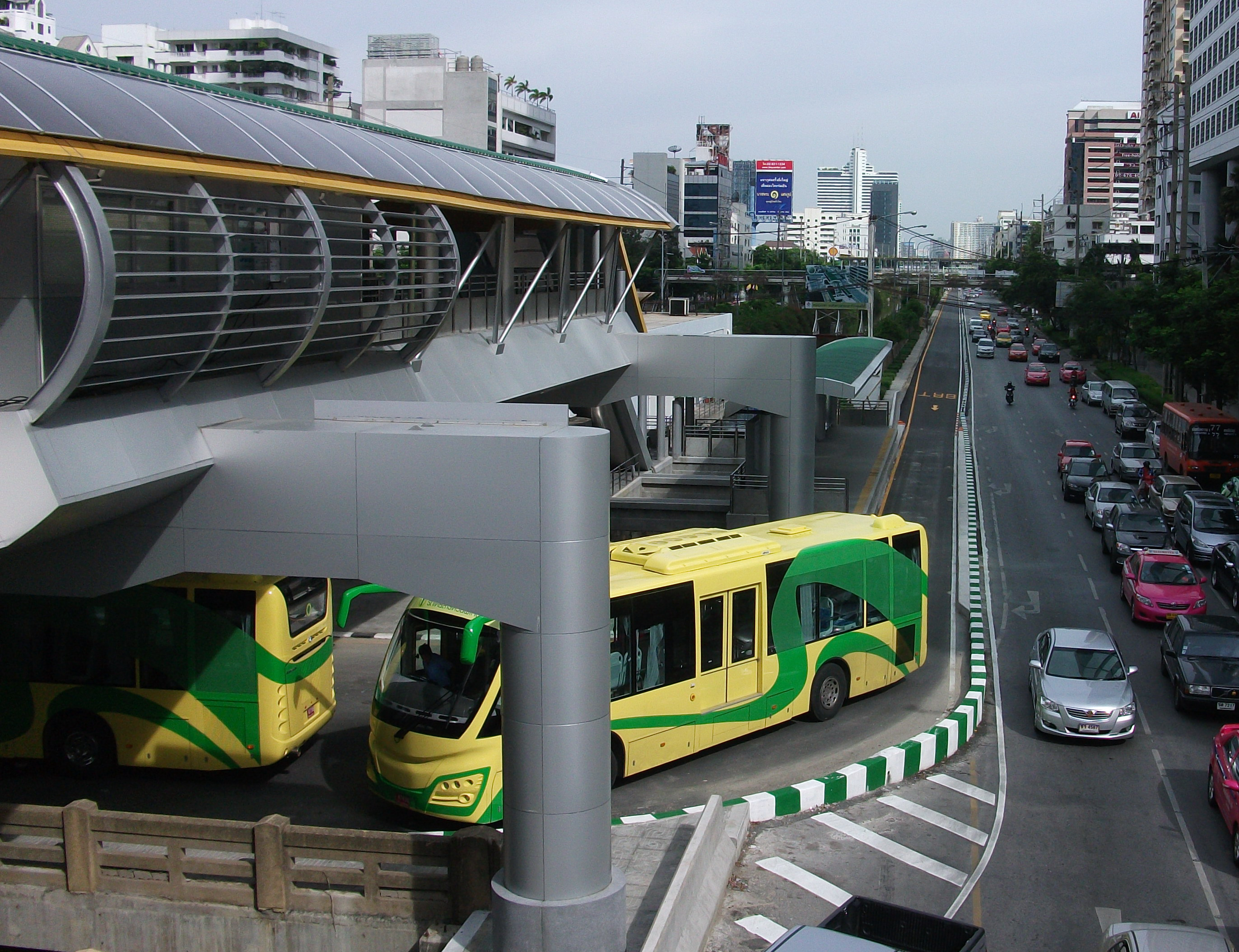
Sathon BRT Station on Naradhiwas Rajanagarindra Road

Naradhiwas Rajanagarindra Road (Thai: ถนนนราธิวาสราชนครินทร์, RTGS: Thanon Narathiwat Ratchanakharin, pronounced [tʰa.nǒn na.rāː.tʰí.wàːt râː.tɕʰá.ná.kʰa.rīn]) is a main thoroughfare in central Bangkok, serving as an important transport route through the Bang Rak, Sathon, and Yan Nawa Districts. It is an eight-lane reinforced concrete boulevard about 60 metres (200 ft) wide and 5.1 kilometres (3.2 mi) long.

The road begins at Surawong Road in the Suriyawong Sub-district, Bang Rak District, running southeast parallel to Khlong Chong Nonsi. It crosses Si Lom Road in the Si Lom Sub-district, Bang Rak, and Sathon Road in Sathon District. In this section, it forms the boundary between Thung Maha Mek and Yan Nawa Sub-districts of Sathon.

Continuing southeast, it intersects Chan Road in Chong Nonsi Sub-district, Yan Nawa District, and finally meets Ratchadaphisek Road before terminating at the Rama III–Naradhiwas or Chong Nonsi junction.

Its name in honour of Princess Galyani Vadhana, Princess of Naradhiwas who was the elder sister of King Ananda Mahidol (Rama VIII) and King Bhumibol Adulyadej (Rama IX). At first it was built it has no official name, later on it was given the name from King Bhumibol Adulyadej in 1996.

== Places of interest ==
- Rajamangala University of Technology Krungthep
- Siam Makro Sathon
- Chong Nonsi BTS station
- Tesco Lotus Rama III
- Wat Pho Maen Khunaram
- MahaNakhon
