= Centenary Park =

Centenary Park may refer to:

- Centenary Park in Croydon, New South Wales, Australia
- Urban Council Centenary Garden in Tsim Sha Tsui East, Kowloon, Hong Kong
- Centenary Park in Bulawayo, Zimbabwe
- Centenary Park, the baseball park of Centenary Gentlemen baseball, Centenary College of Louisiana
- Chulalongkorn University Centenary Park in Bangkok, Thailand
