= Khlong Chong Nonsi =

Canal in Bangkok, Thailand

Coordinates: 13.694997364°N 100.548534759°E

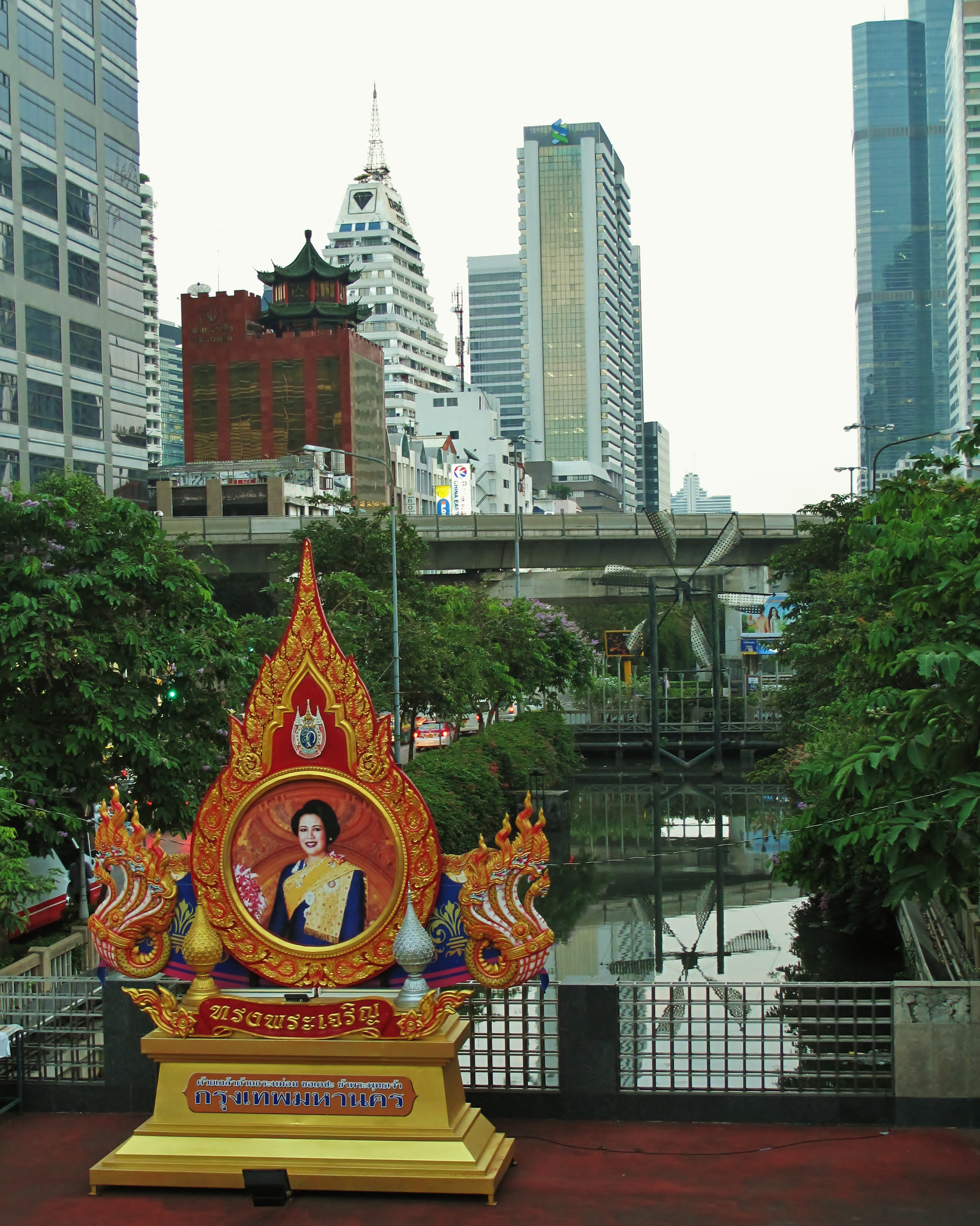
Khlong Chong Nonsi and the (replica) windmill, a symbol of Silom road, at the Bang Rak–Naradhiwas intersection.

Khlong Chong Nonsi (Thai: คลองช่องนนทรี, pronounced [kʰlɔ̄ːŋ t͡ɕʰɔ̂ŋ nōn.sīː]) is a khlong (canal) in one of the busiest and the most crowded business districts of Bangkok, as well as the nearby Khlong Sathon.

Khlong Chong Nonsi runs from Surawong road all the way to the Chao Phraya river, covering a distance of approximately 4.5 km (2.8 mi) through the districts of Bang Rak, Sathon, and Yan Nawa. The canal also gives its name to Chong Nonsi, one of the two subdistricts (khwaengs) in Yan Nawa district, where it empties into the Chao Phraya river. At present, the canal runs parallel to the entire length of Naradhiwas Rajanagarindra road. Along its course, it intersects with several roads, including Chan road and Rama III road. The BTS Skytrain Silom Line is located at its northern end, while the BRT bus system operates along much of the canal. The width of the canal at its mouth is about 20 m (65.6 ft), while the section running along Naradhiwas Rajanagarindra road is approximately 6–8 m (19.7–26.2 ft) wide. 6 m (19.7 ft)–8 m (26.2 ft) wide.

Its name "Chong Nonsi" is believed to be distorted from the word "Chong Nang Ni" (ช่องนางหนี) which means "a channel that lady escaped". It comes from a folklore "Legend of Lord U Thong", the story about an Ayutthaya mythical king named U Thong, (Note: Not U Thong or Ramathibodi I, the founder of Ayutthaya kingdom.) who escaped cholera to various places and gave rise to the names of different places later on.

A 2018 survey found that Khlong Chong Nonsi, especially the intersection of Silom and Surawong roads, was the dirtiest in Bangkok.

== Chong Nonsi Canal Park ==
On December 25, 2021, the Chong Nonsi Canal Park was opened by Bangkok Metropolitan Administration (BMA). It is the first phase of the Khlong Chong Nonsi restoration project with a distance of 200 m (656.2 ft) from the total project distance of 4.5 km (2.8 mi). The construction period is divided into four phases.
