= Bangkok BRT =

Bus rapid transit system in Bangkok, Thailand

- BRT
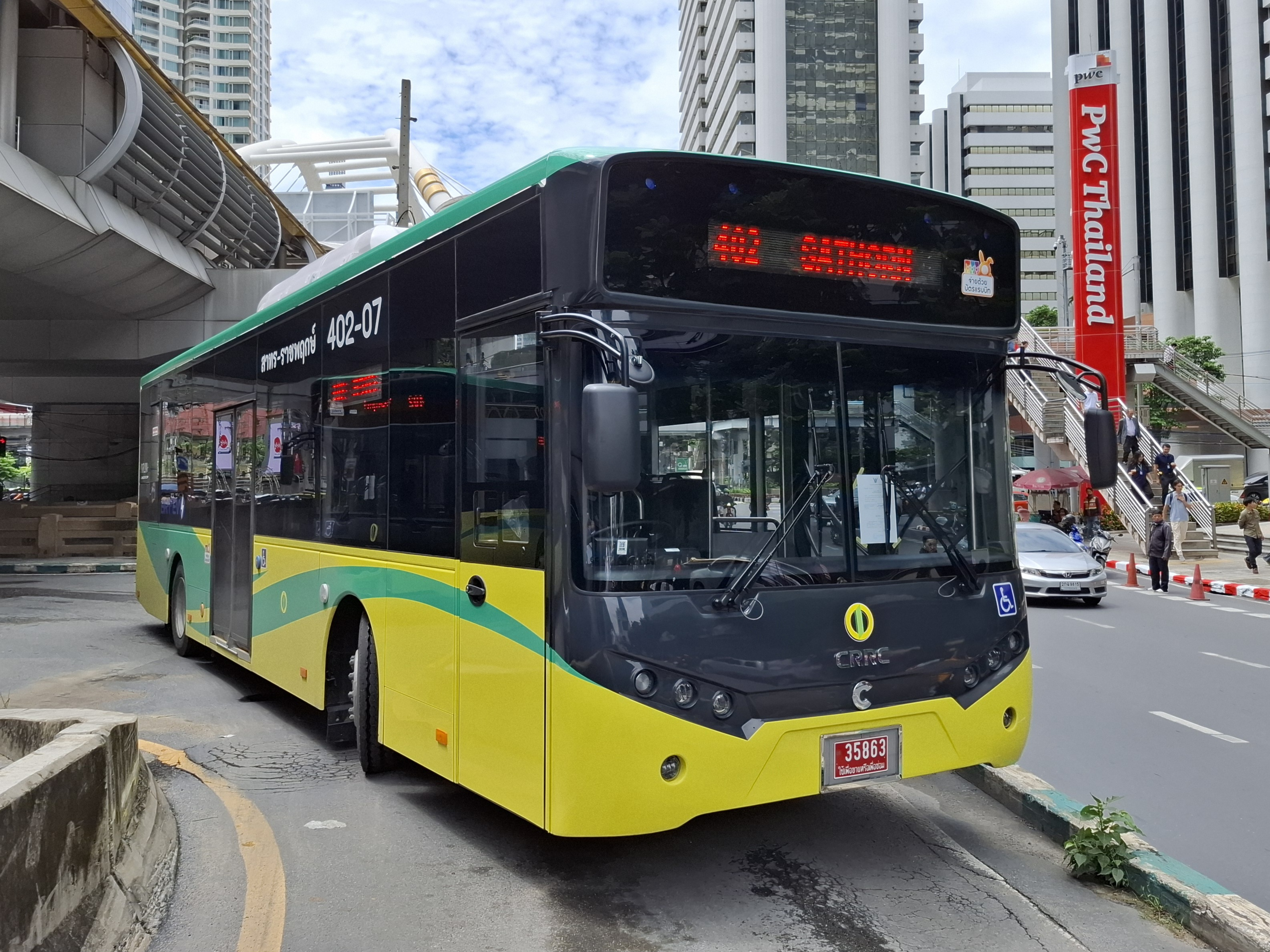
- CRRC EV Bus at Sathorn BRT Station in September 2024

Overview
- Native name: รถโดยสารประจำทางด่วนพิเศษ สายสาทร-ราชพฤกษ์
- Owner: Bangkok Metropolitan Administration
- Locale: Bangkok
- Transit type: Bus rapid transit
- Number of stations: 14 stations
- Daily ridership: 25,000

Operation
- Began operation: 23 May 2010; 16 years ago
- Operator: Bangkok Mass Transit System Public Company Limited
- Character: Fully at-grade
- Number of vehicles: Current: CRRC EV Bus: 23 cars Former: Sunlong SLK6215CNG: 25 cars
- Headway: 5-7 mins (peak-hour); 10 mins (off peak-hour, weekends, and public holiday)

Technical
- System length: 16.5 km (10.3 mi)
- Average speed: 30 km/h
- Top speed: 60 km/h

The Bangkok BRT is a bus rapid transit system in Bangkok, Thailand that consists of one line connecting Sathorn with Ratchaphruek.

The 16 kilometres (9.9 mi) route has 14 stations in the centre of the road that give at grade access to the right hand side of the buses. Both termini connect to the Silom Line of the BTS Skytrain; Sathorn station with Chong Nonsi BTS station and Ratchaphruek with Talat Phlu BTS station. The Bangkok BRT runs at-grade with exclusive bus lanes in some sections.

Unlike most bus rapid transit routes around the world, Bangkok BRT uses smaller, non-articulated 12-metre buses. Since service upgrades that commenced on 1 September 2024, Bangkok BRT has been served by low-floor CRRC electric buses.

The line is owned by Krungthep Thanakom PCL, the holdings enterprise of the Bangkok Metropolitan Administration (BMA), and operated by Bangkok Mass Transit System PCL (BTSC), the operator of the BTS Skytrain. It is a system run separately from the publicly-run BMTA buses and Thai Smile Group private buses.

== History ==
Plans for a bus rapid transit system in Bangkok were made in 2004 by the Bangkok Metropolitan Administration and the Ministry of Transport's Office of Transport and Traffic Policy and Planning. In 2005, the BMA settled on a master plan consisting of fourteen BRT routes. Construction began in 2007 on the first route, Sathorn–Ratchaphruek. The route opened for trial operation on 29 May 2010 and officially inaugurated on 14 February 2011 with 12 stations.

The government also planned additional four routes to open before 2013: Mo Chit – Government Complex – Nonthaburi, Sathorn – Suk Sawat, Don Mueang – Min Buri–Suvarnabhumi, and Min Buri – Srinagarindra – Samrong. However, plans were progressively dropped beginning with the announcement in September 2010 that the Mo Chit-Government Complex route was going to be cancelled.

From its onset, the Bangkok BRT suffered from low ridership and financial losses. For these reasons, the BMA contemplated closing the route in early 2017. An opinion survey conducted by the BMA found that there was enough demand for the service to be retained. In March 2017 the Governor of Bangkok announced the service would continue, but that the fare would be raised to 15 THB. and changed operator to Bangkok Mass Transit System Public Company Limited.

On 2 February 2024, BTSC won the BMA's bid to operate and develop the BRT system. The existing route is expected to extend from Sathorn to Lumphini MRT station with an additional service to CentralPlaza Rama III shopping mall. As part of the bid, BTSC was assigned to procure electric buses with doors to accommodate both the current high-level platforms and for street-level. Two new infill stations are also planned to be built: Yaek Chan - Naradhiwas Rajanagarindra (between B3-B4) and Yaek Naradhiwas Rajanagarindra - Ratchadaphisek (between B4-B5).

From opening until 2024, Bangkok BRT had been operated using Sunlong SLK6125CNG high-floor buses. New electric buses built by CRRC were deployed on the line on 1 September 2024. Additional changes included the commissioning of two infill stations, Thanon Chan Neau (B3a) and Thanon Chan Tai (B4a). These changes were expected to increase ridership to 13,000 passengers daily. In conjunction with the changes, fares were suspended for the first two months until November 2024. Since then, fares have been capped at a flat rate of 15 THB.

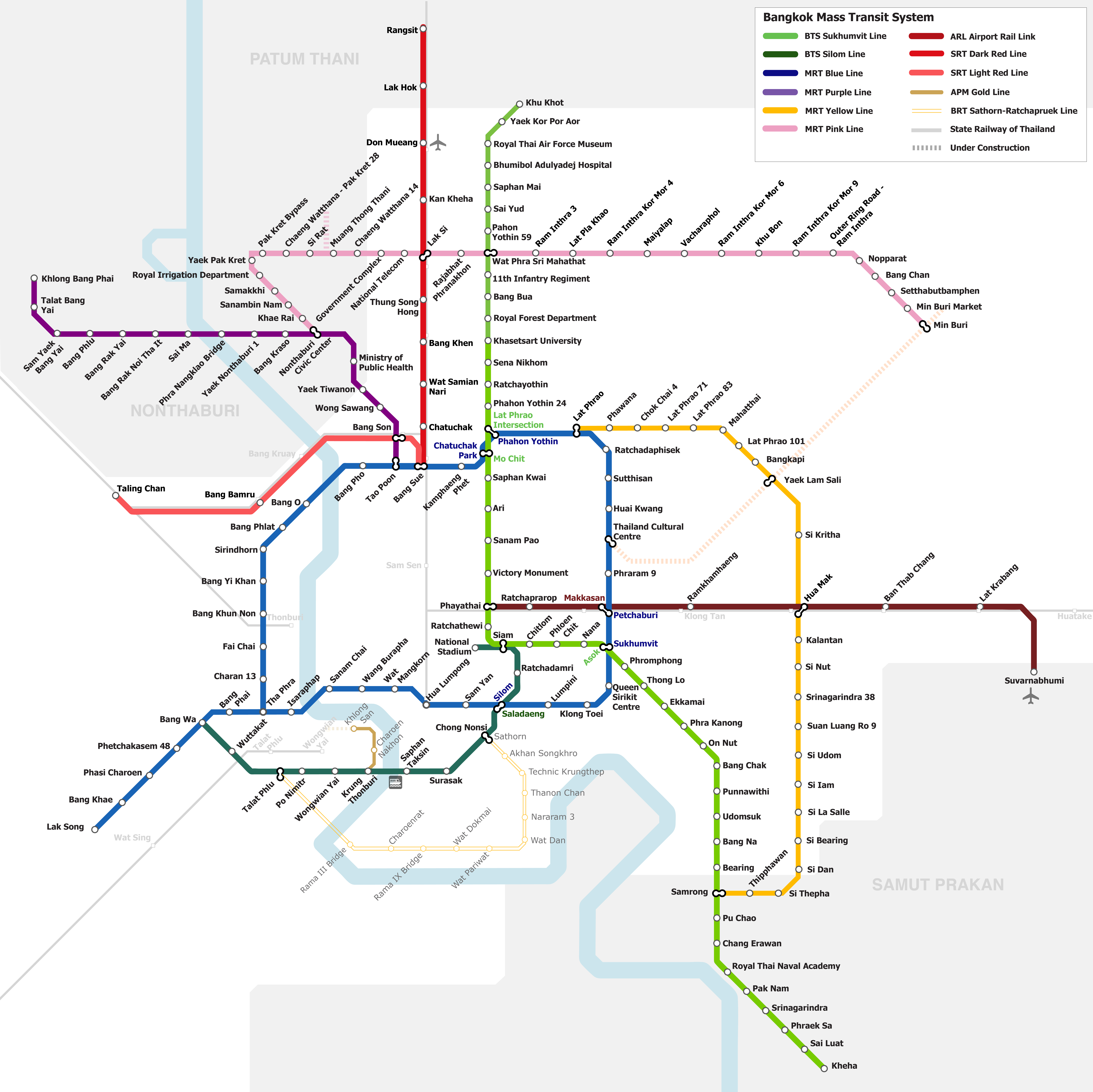
Bangkok Mass Transit map and BRT route

Commuters criticised the changes, citing that the high-level platforms at BRT stations were not compatible with the new low-floor buses. Passengers could not board the buses from platform level and instead have to use emergency staircases at the end of the platform to board or disembark, causing overcrowding at stations. Initially, the slow rollout of the new buses meant that only 16 out of 23 buses were able to operate during peak hours, resulting in 12-minute frequencies. The Traffic and Transportation Department stated that the overcrowding problem is due by the delayed installation of a bus charging station at Sathorn, meaning that all buses have to use the only existing charging station at Ratchaphruek. The issue with the boarding process will be resolved by extending the platforms to accommodate the new low-floor buses.

== Route ==
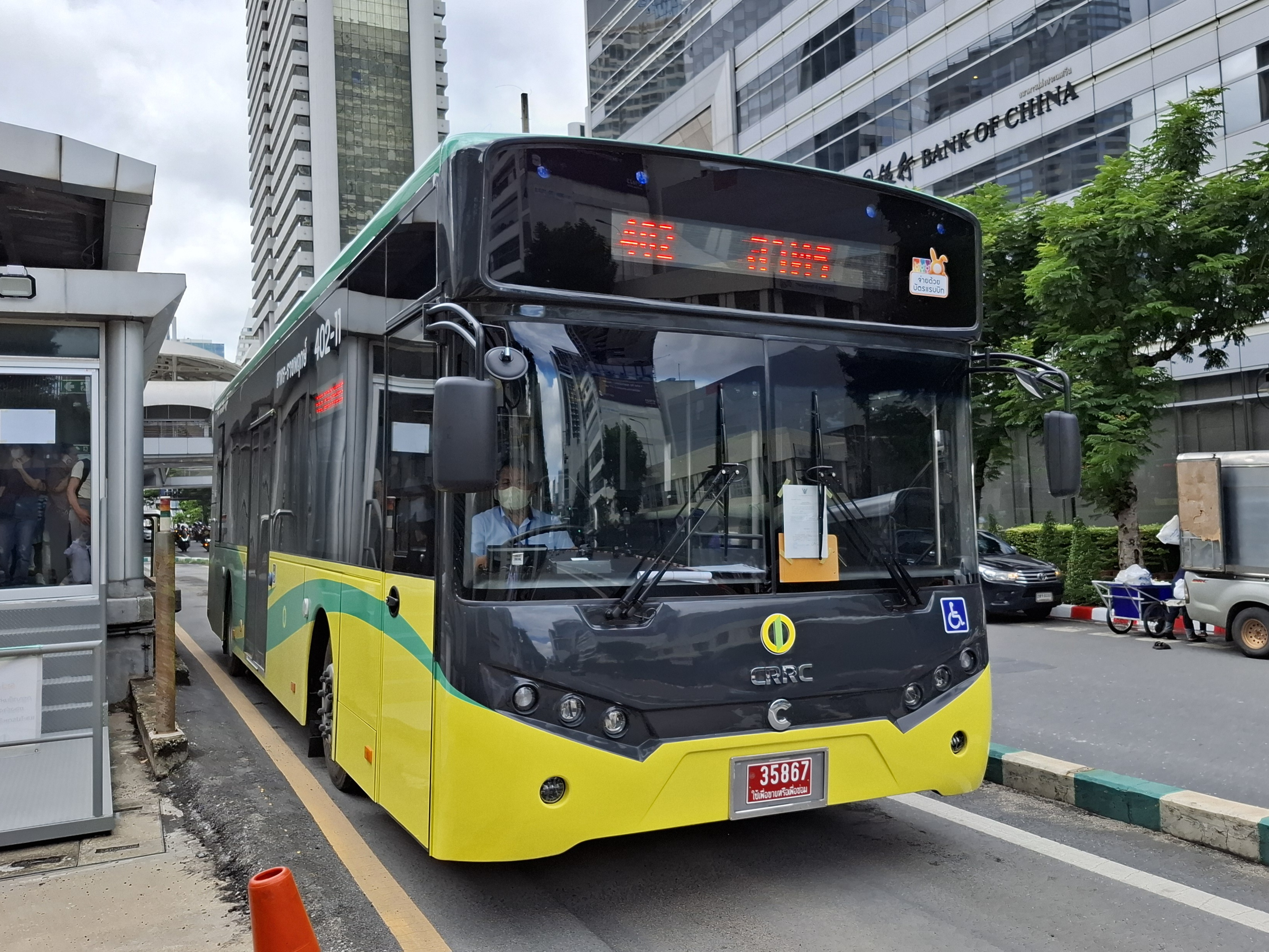
CRRC EV Bus at Sathorn station.

The Sathon to Ratchaphruek route follows Naradhiwas Ratchanagrindra and Rama III Roads.

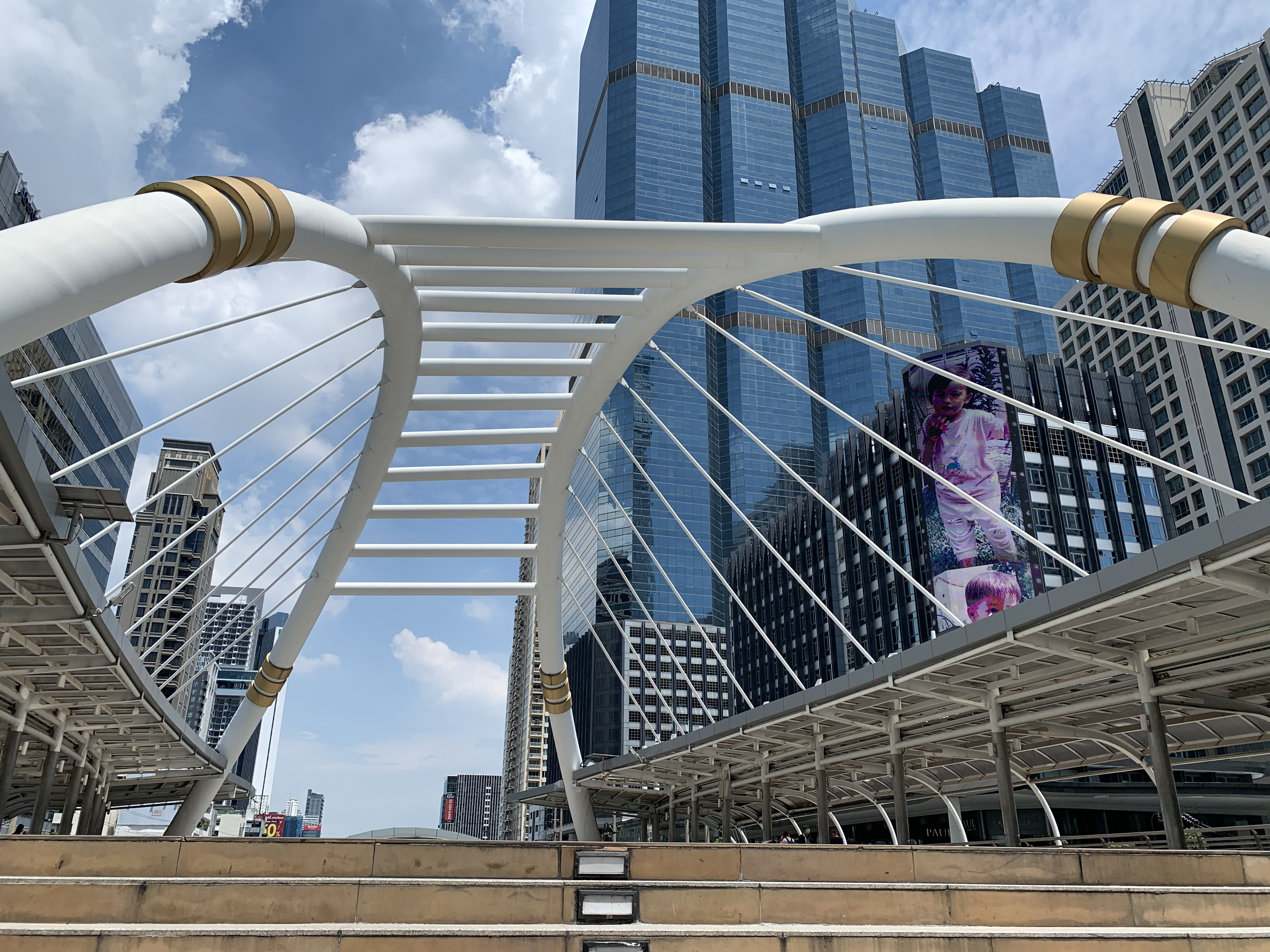
The Chong Nonsi Skywalk serves as a connecting point between the Silom Line and the BRT.

The route operates in exclusive lanes physically separated from other road traffic using barriers or in HOV lanes with three occupants or more. The route does not have grade separation at some intersections, therefore causing delays. The configuration required the use of dedicated lanes, drawing criticism from motorists who believed that it exacerbated traffic due to the loss of traffic lanes.

Stations are located in the middle of the road and feature island platforms, accessible via skywalks/footbridges. Consequently, buses have doors on the driver's side/right-hand side, unusual for buses in Thailand which have doors on the left-hand-side due to Thai traffic being left hand traffic. Stations have high-level platforms that provided step-free access to the Sunlong buses, which were high-floor buses. In addition, stations contain amentities such as ticket offices as well as step-free access for wheelchair users.

The vehicles have a guide system used while they are stopped at station to ensure a minimum gap between the station platform and the vehicle.

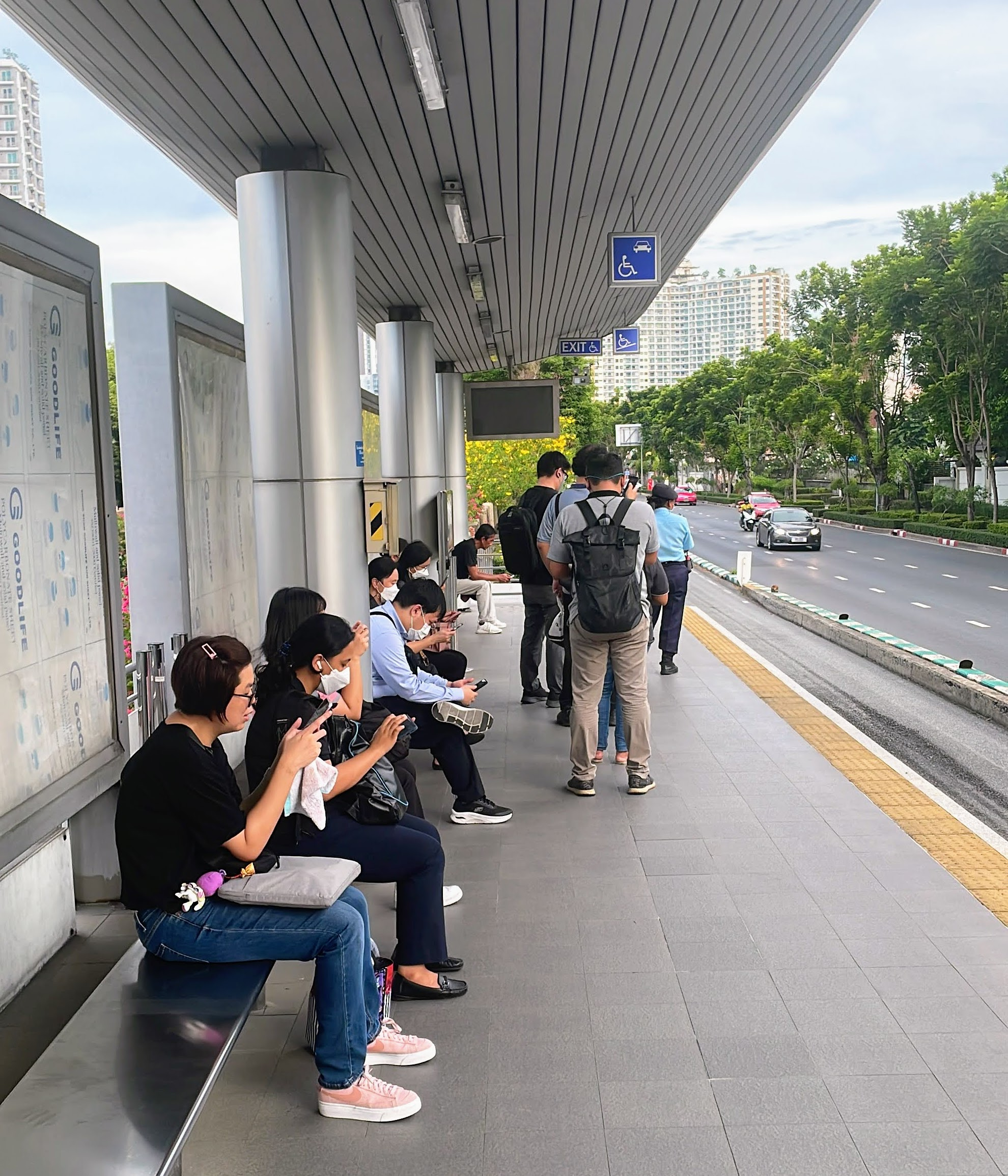
People waiting for the bus at Thanon Chan BRT station

Buses operate between 06:00-24:00 at 7-10 minute intervals during off-peak hours and weekends and 5 minute intervals at peak hours. An additional service between Sathorn and Nararam III is in operation during peak hours.

=== Stations ===
Code	Station Name		Opened	Transfer	Notes
Code	English	Thai	Opened	Transfer	Notes
	Sathorn	สาทร	29 May 2010; 16 years ago	Connecting station to Chong Nonsi for BTS via Chong Nonsi Skywalk.	Exit to: • Chong Nonsi Skywalk • Chong Nonsi Canal Park • King Power Mahanakhon • Empire Tower • Sathorn Square • Bangkok City Tower • Rajanakarn Building • Sathorn Nakhon Tower
	Akhan Songkhro	อาคารสงเคราะห์	29 May 2010; 16 years ago		Exit to: • JC Kevin Sathorn Bangkok Hotel
	Technic Krungthep	เทคนิคกรุงเทพ	29 May 2010; 16 years ago		Exit to: • Rajamangala University of Technology Krungthep • Makro Sathorn • The Federation of Thai Industries
	Thanon Chan Neau	ถนนจันทน์เหนือ	1 September 2024; 2 years ago		Additional station
	Thanon Chan	ถนนจันทน์	29 May 2010; 16 years ago		Exit to: • Gallery VER • Taweewattana School • Saint Joseph Yannawa School
	Thanon Chan Tai	ถนนจันทน์ใต้	1 September 2024; 2 years ago		Additional station
	Nararam 3	นราราม 3	29 May 2010; 16 years ago		
	Wat Dan	วัดด่าน	29 May 2010; 16 years ago		Exit to: • S.V. City Tower • INT-Intersect • Wat Dan • Wat Dan School
	Wat Pariwat	วัดปริวาส	29 May 2010; 16 years ago		Exit to: • Wat Pariwat • Wat Pariwat School
	Wat Dokmai	วัดดอกไม้	29 May 2010; 16 years ago		Exit to: • Wat Dokmai • Wat Dokmai School
	Rama IX Bridge	สะพานพระรามเก้า	29 May 2010; 16 years ago		Exit to: • Wat Sai Rama 3 • Wat Bang Khlo Nok • Homepro Rama 3 • Public Park in Commemoration of H.M. the King's 6th Cycle Birthday
	Charoenrat	เจริญราษฎร์	29 May 2010; 16 years ago		Exit to: • Tree on 3 • Terminal 21 Rama 3
	Rama III Bridge	สะพานพระรามสาม	29 May 2010; 16 years ago		Exit to: • Bang Kho Laem District Office • Wat Inbanjong
	Ratchaphruek	ราชพฤกษ์	29 May 2010; 16 years ago	Connecting station to Talat Phlu for BTS	Exit to: • The Mall Tha Phra • Tha Phra Open Air Market • Thonburi Plaza

== Fleet ==
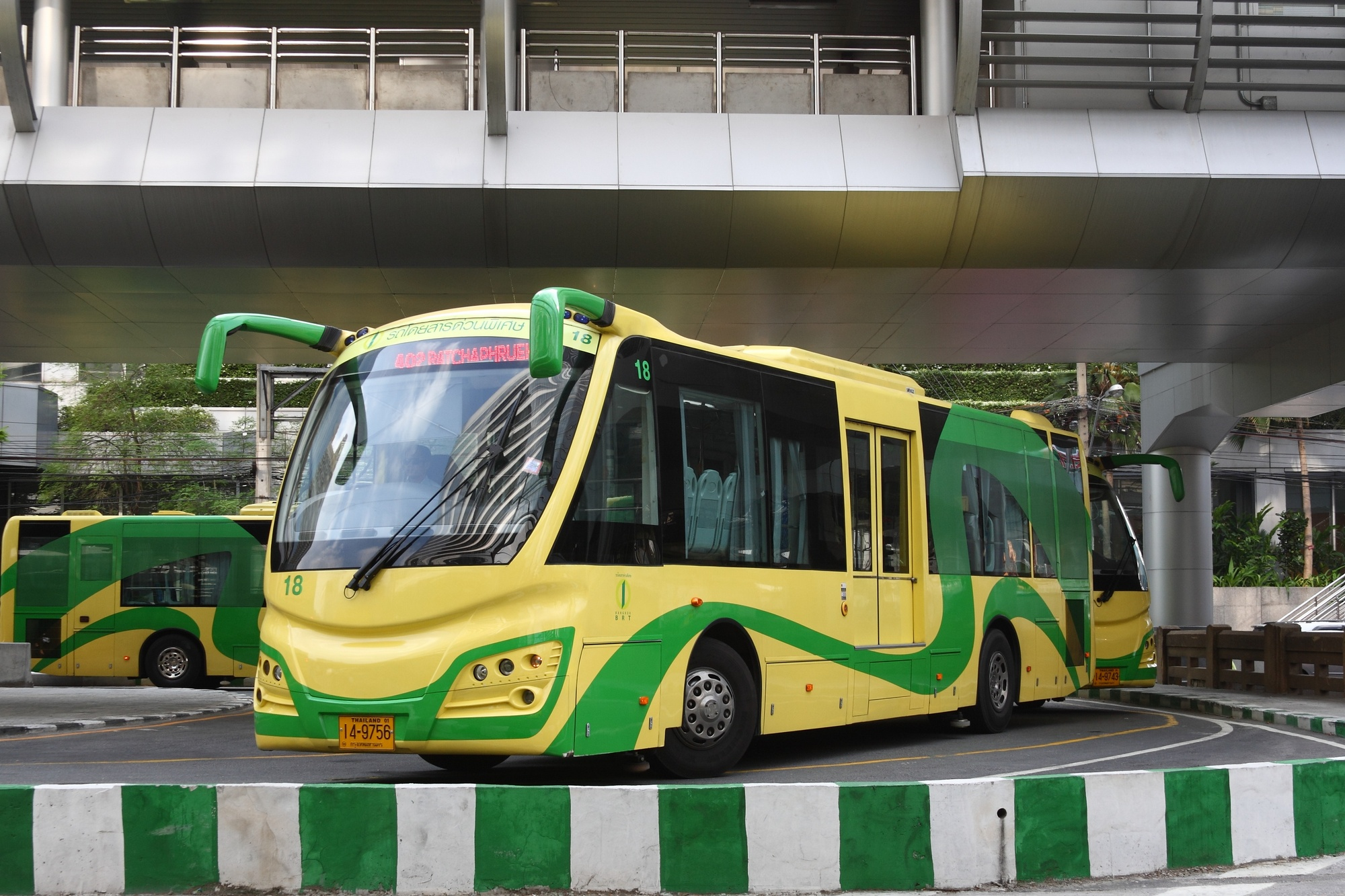
Sunlong SLK6215CNG (2010–2024)

Bangkok BRT uses single-deck buses with a length of 12 metres, a width of 2.54 metres, and a height of 3.44 metres. The system uses a fleet of 23 electric buses manufactured as part of a joint venture between CRRC and Cherdchai Group, a domestic company. Each bus can carry at least 80 passengers. Until September 2024, the Bangkok BRT were operated with Sunlong high floor buses.

=== Livery ===
The exterior of the bus features a yellow background with green stripes. This design resulted from a contest organised by the Bangkok Metropolitan Administration in 2008 under the concept "Put Your Colors on Bangkok BRT," with yellow and green as the given colors. The winning design was created by a student from King Mongkut's Institute of Technology Ladkrabang. It was inspired by the swift motions of hand movements while drawing quick pencil strokes, symbolizing fast, reliable, and convenient service. The flowing lines indicate the flexibility of a moving hand, with thicker lines towards the back mimicking the forward movement of a bus.

=== Communications ===
The buses are equipped with GPS tracking, enabling passengers to track their real-time location through the Viabus app.

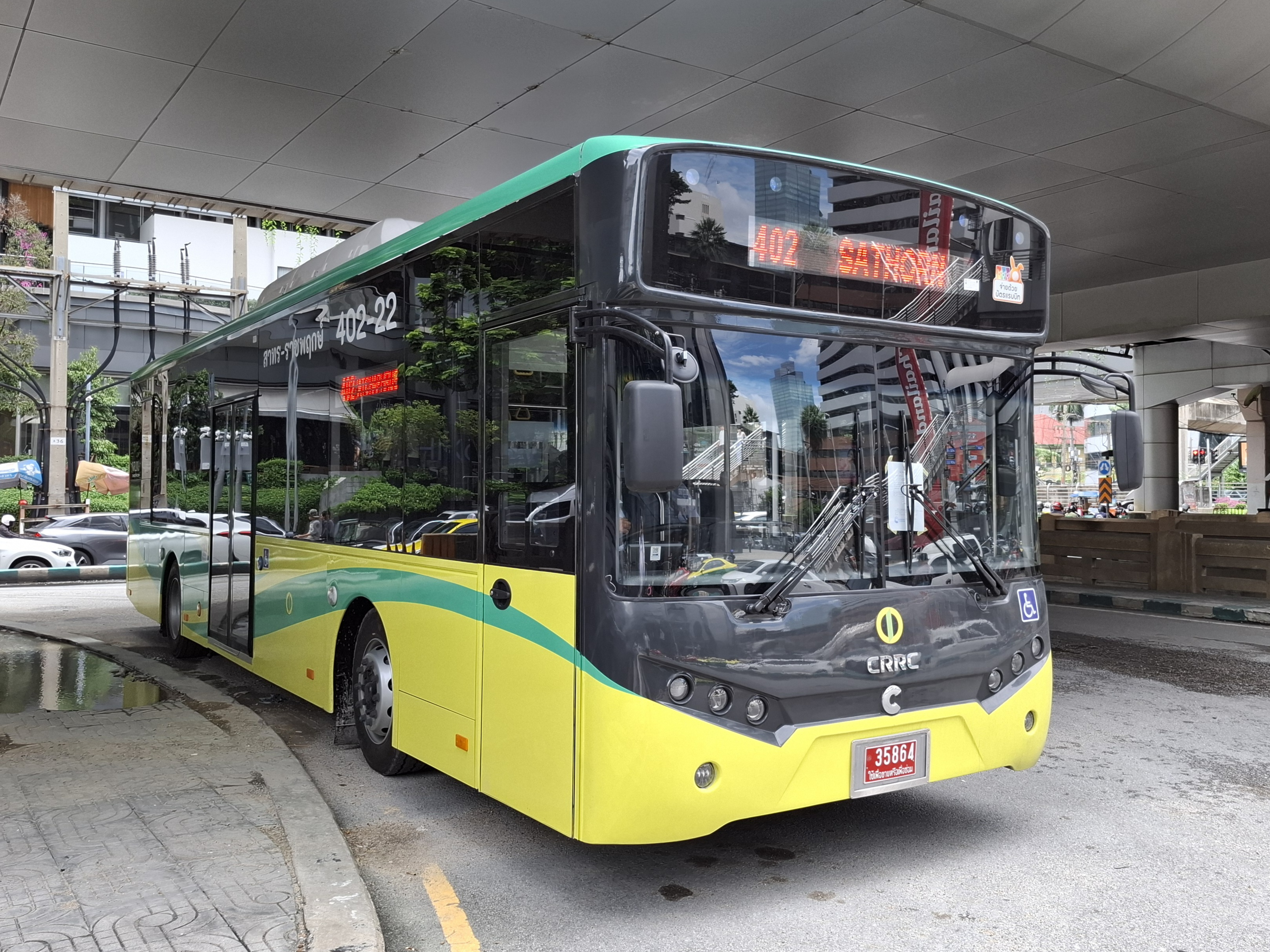
CRRC EV Bus (2024-present)

A passenger information system automatically announces station names on a LED display. Audio announcements are made by Thai actress Ratklao Amaradit who also voices announcements for the BTS Skytrain system. The electronic sign at the front of the bus indicates the terminal station. The bus is also equipped with a GPS and radio transmission to communicate with the control centre.

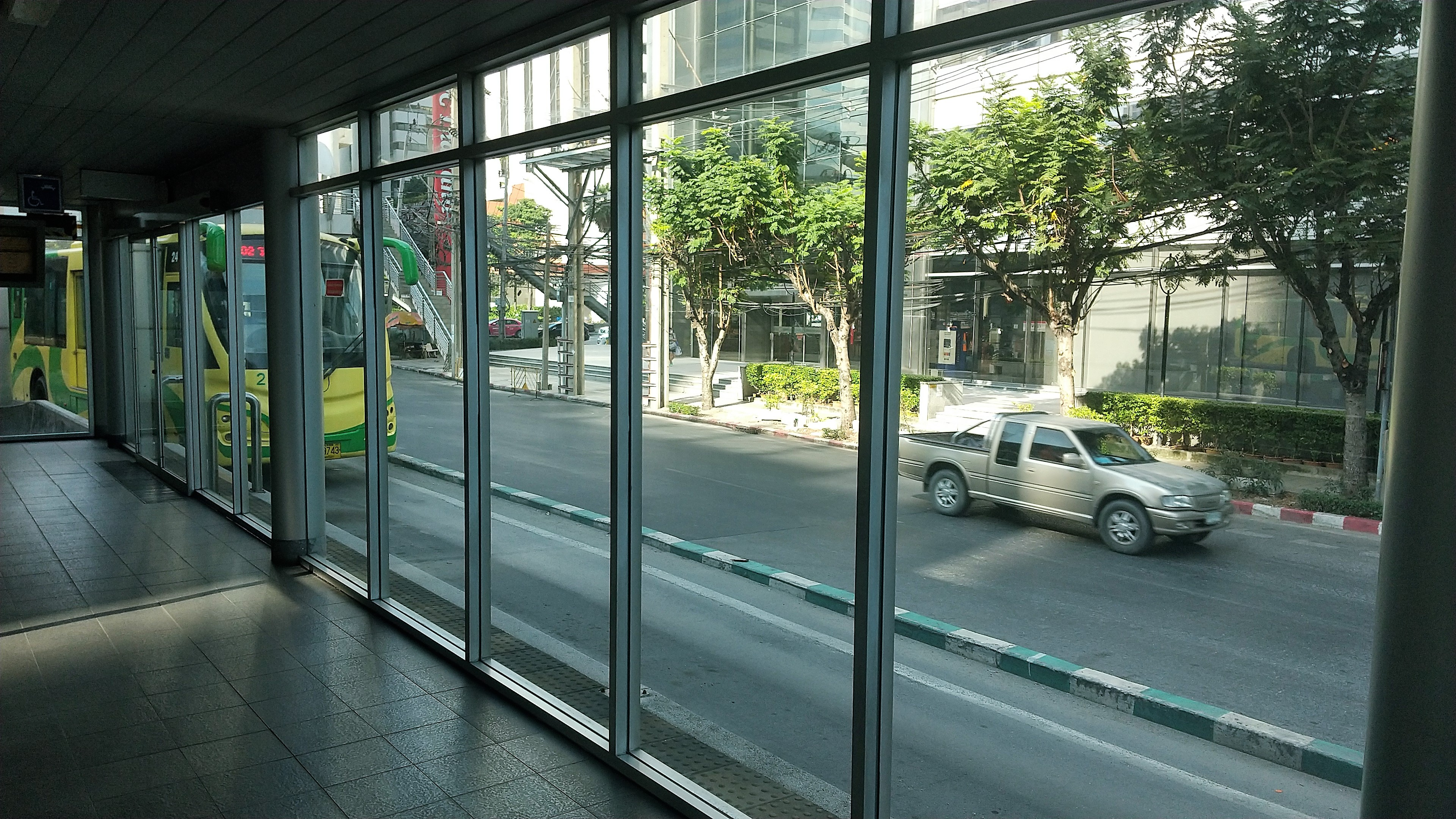
Platform screen doors at Sathorn station.

=== Safety Features ===
The bus equipped with several safety features, including:
• CCTV cameras inside the bus with digital recording system that can store footage for 72 hours

• A rear-facing CCTV camera outside the bus to assist the driver while reversing and monitoring

• Emergency stop buttons

• Two fire extinguishers are featured on board

• Guidance system which automatically aligns the bus with the station platform

• Automatic sensor sliding doors to ensure passenger safety while boarding or exiting the bus

=== Facilities for wheelchair users ===
Each bus is equipped with two wheelchair locks and a ramp that can be extended from the bus to the platform to facilitate the boarding and alighting process for wheelchair users.

=== Signalling ===
The line uses Intelligent Transportation Systems (ITS) to control the signals for BRT, ensuring the buses priority when passing through junctions via the dedicated traffic lights. This system can also indicate the arrival time of the next bus.

== Fares and ticketing ==
Since November 2024, Bangkok BRT is charging a flat fare of 15 THB per ride. Fares are payable via Rabbit Card which is also used to pay for the Bangkok rail networks that the operator operates, namely the BTS Skytrain, MRT Yellow Line and MRT Pink Line. A discount fare is available for senior citizens who instead pay 11 THB. Fares are also payable via QR codes through the LINE app as ticket sales on-system have ended.

== Services ==
=== Headways ===
Bangkok BRT headway
Time	Section	Headway (Minutes:Seconds)
Monday - Friday
06.00 - 07.00	Full Line	10:00
07:00 - 09:00	Full Line	07:00
09:00 - 17:00	Full Line	15:00
17:00 - 20:00	Full Line	07:00
20:00 - 21:00	Full Line	15:00
22:00 - 24:00	Full Line	20:00
Weekend and Public Holiday
06:00 - 21:00	Full Line	15:00
21:00 - 24:00	Full Line	20:00

=== Ridership ===
Bangkok BRT Ridership
Year	Quarter	Quarterly Ridership	Daily Ridership	Annual Ridership	Remarks
2010 - 2016		No Information			
2017	Q1	1,696,505	18,851	5,326,369	
2017	Q2	1,048,838	11,526	5,326,369	
2017	Q3	1,380,038	15,001	5,326,369	
2017	Q4	1,200,988	13,055	5,326,369	
2018	Q1	1,151,008	12,790	4,557,504	
2018	Q2	1,073,535	11,798	4,557,504	
2018	Q3	1,215,840	13,215	4,557,504	
2018	Q4	1,117,121	12,142	4,557,504	
2019	Q1	1,102,850	12,254	4,649,783	
2019	Q2	1,076,017	11,825	4,649,783	
2019	Q3	1,292,471	14,049	4,649,783	
2019	Q4	1,178,445	12,810	4,649,783	
2020	Q1	1,071,215	11,903	3,306,450	First wave of COVID-19 outbreaks (January 2020 - May 2020)
2020	Q2	470,829	779	3,306,450	First wave of COVID-19 outbreaks (January 2020 - May 2020)
2020	Q3	891,763	9,694	3,306,450	
2020	Q4	872,643	9,486	3,306,450	Second wave of COVID-19 outbreaks (December 2020 - February 2021)
2021	Q1	634,095	7,046	1,891,145	Second wave of COVID-19 outbreaks (December 2020 - February 2021)
2021	Q2	388,126	4,266	1,891,145	Third wave of COVID-19 outbreaks (April 2021 - June 2021)
2021	Q3	335,299	3,645	1,891,145	Fourth wave of COVID-19 outbreaks (July 2021 - early 2022)
2021	Q4	533,625	5,801	1,891,145	Fourth wave of COVID-19 outbreaks (July 2021 - early 2022)
2022	Q1	438,644	4,874	2,471,699	Fourth wave of COVID-19 outbreaks (July 2021 - early 2022)
2022	Q2	538,909	5,923	2,471,699	
2022	Q3	721,426	7,842	2,471,699	
2022	Q4	772,720	8,400	2,471,699	
2023	Q1	777,294	8,636	1,456,291	
2023	Q2	678,997	7,462	1,456,291	
2023	Q3				Data has not been announced from July 2023 to the present.
2023	Q4				Data has not been announced from July 2023 to the present.

== See also ==
- List of bus rapid transit systems
- Rabbit Card
- BTS Skytrain
