= Dongfeng EV400 =

Electric logistics van

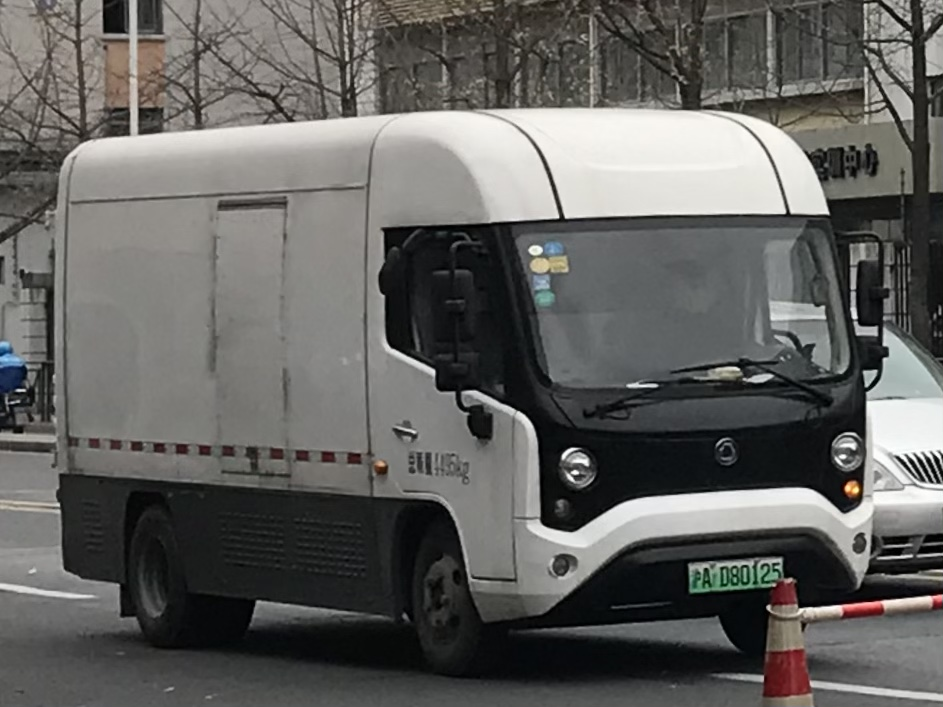
- Sunlong Guangxi Yibian NEV electric logistics van (based on Dongfeng EV400)

Overview
- Manufacturer: Dongfeng Automobile Company; Sunlong- Guangxi Yibian
- Also called: Dongfeng Captain EV400 (凯普特EV400); Sunlong Guangxi Yibian NEV logistics van
- Production: 2018—present
- Model years: 2018—present
- Assembly: Wuhan, China; Xiangyang, China

Body and chassis
- Class: Light commercial vehicle
- Body style: Van
- Layout: Rear-engine, rear-wheel-drive

Powertrain
- Electric motor: Permanent magnet synchronous
- Power output: 110 kW (148 hp; 150 PS)
- Battery: 86.2 kWh EVE Energy
- Electric range: 185–360 km (115–224 mi)

Dimensions
- Wheelbase: 3,308–3,800 mm (130.2–149.6 in)
- Length: 5,995–6,950 mm (236.0–273.6 in)
- Width: 2,280–2,360 mm (89.8–92.9 in)
- Height: 2,890–3,360 mm (113.8–132.3 in)
- Curb weight: 3,000–5,580 kg (6,614–12,302 lb)

The Dongfeng EV400 or DFAC Captain EV400 is an electric light, commercial logistics van designed and produced by the Chinese automaker Dongfeng Automobile Company since 2018.

== Overview ==
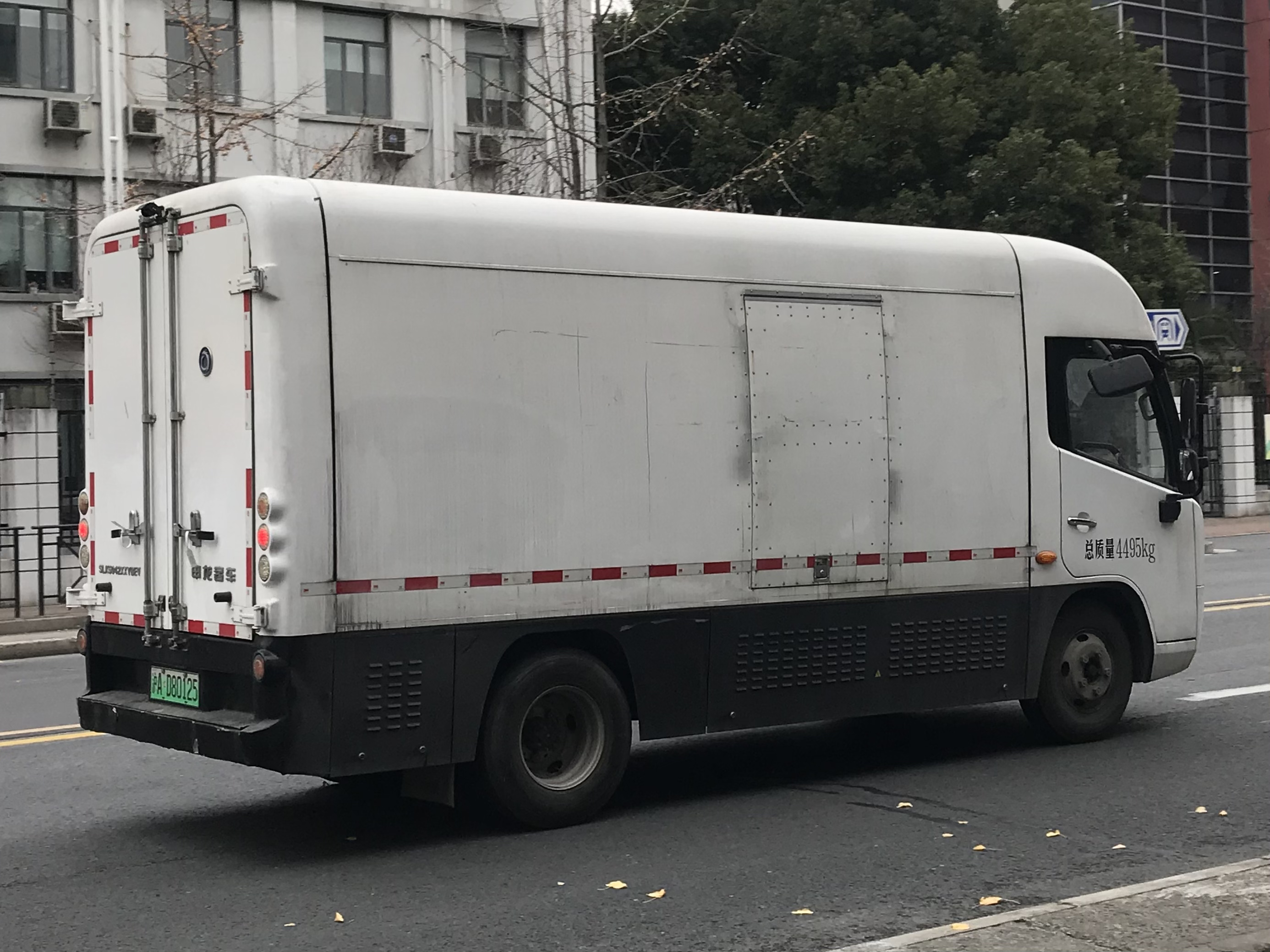
Rear quarter view

The Dongfeng EV400 has three range variants, with an electric range of 185 km (115 mi), 220 km (137 mi) and 360 km (224 mi) respectively. The top speed in 90 km/h (56 mph) for models produced in Xiangyang, Hubei and 95 km/h (59 mph) for models produced in Wuhan, Hubei.

The Dongfeng EV400 was built on a frame chassis with a permanent magnet synchronous electric motor codenamed TZ310XS-LKM0503 supplied by LVKON positioned over the rear axle, with the output of which reaching 110 kW (148 hp; 150 PS), and 500 N⋅m (369 lb⋅ft) of torque. The battery of the EV400 is a 86.02 kWh battery supplied by Eve Energy with a density of 136.74 Wh/kg. The EV400 is a 2- to 3-seater vehicle.

=== Sunlong Guangxi Nanning Yibian NEV ===
A rebadged variant produced by Sunlong Guangxi Nanning Yibian NEV (申龙 广西一卞新能源) of Sunlong was briefly available. Models are only offered for rent and lease services as of January 2021.
