= The Empire (Bangkok) =

The Empire (Formerly " Empire Tower")
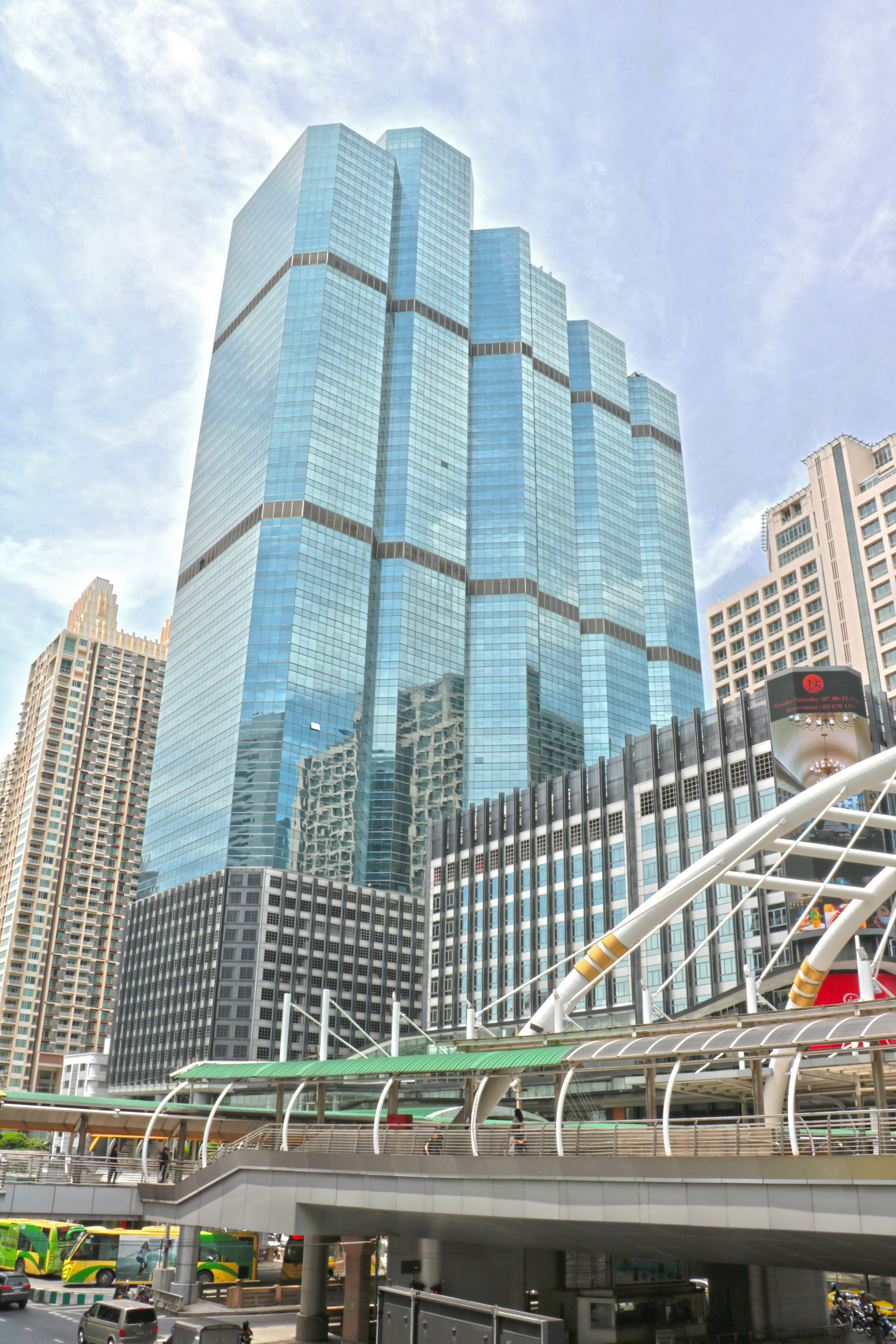
- The Empire in 2016

General information
- Type: Office
- Location: Bangkok, Thailand
- Coordinates: 13°43′13″N 100°31′49″E
- Construction started: 1995
- Opening: 1999

Height
- Antenna spire: 227 m (745 ft)
- Roof: 227 m (745 ft)

Technical details
- Floor count: 62 aboveground
- Lifts/elevators: 52

Design and construction
- Architect: ACT Consultants

Website
- https://www.empirebuilding.co/en/home

The Empire (Thai: เอ็มไพร์ทาวเวอร์) is a skyscraper located in Sathon business district, Bangkok, Thailand, adjacent to Sathon Road and Narathiwat Road, close to Chong Nonsi Station (Silom Line of the BTS Skytrain). Empire Tower 1 is currently the 20th tallest building in Bangkok. It was once the tallest all office building in Thailand. The Empire Tower 1 has 58 floors and is 227 metres tall. The Building has since been redeveloped as "The Empire", with office, retail, dining and lifestyle spaces. It is directly connected by skybridge to Chong Nonsi BTS and Sathorn BRT sations.

== See also ==
- List of tallest buildings in Thailand
