= Kaem Ling =

Flood control measure in Thailand

Kaem Ling ('monkey cheeks') (Thai: แก้มลิง) is a flood control measure based on the vision of King Bhumibol Adulyadej of Thailand. The idea stems from his observation that monkeys store bananas in their cheeks, conserving them to eat later. He applied this concept to the problem of flooding in Bangkok. Storing excess water in north Thailand would slows its progress towards Bangkok and allow it to be used when rainfall slackened. The monkey cheeks concept was the inspiration for the design of Chulalongkorn University Centenary Park by Kotchakorn Voraakhom.

== Mechanics ==
- The canals used as the water storage reservoirs are filled with water when the rain is very heavy.
- Floodgates are opened to let water flow out to the sea when the sea level is lower than the level of the water in the canals.
- Floodgates are closed when the sea level is higher than the level of water in the canal to prevent seawater from flowing into the canals.

== Procedures ==
1. Find the place to serve as storage reservoirs to divert flood water into
2. Build connections to the storage reservoirs
3. Release the water so that it flows out of the reservoir regularly when the water level of storage canals is higher than sea level.
