= Sathon Road =

Street in Bangkok, Thailand

Coordinates: 13°43′17″N 100°31′35″E

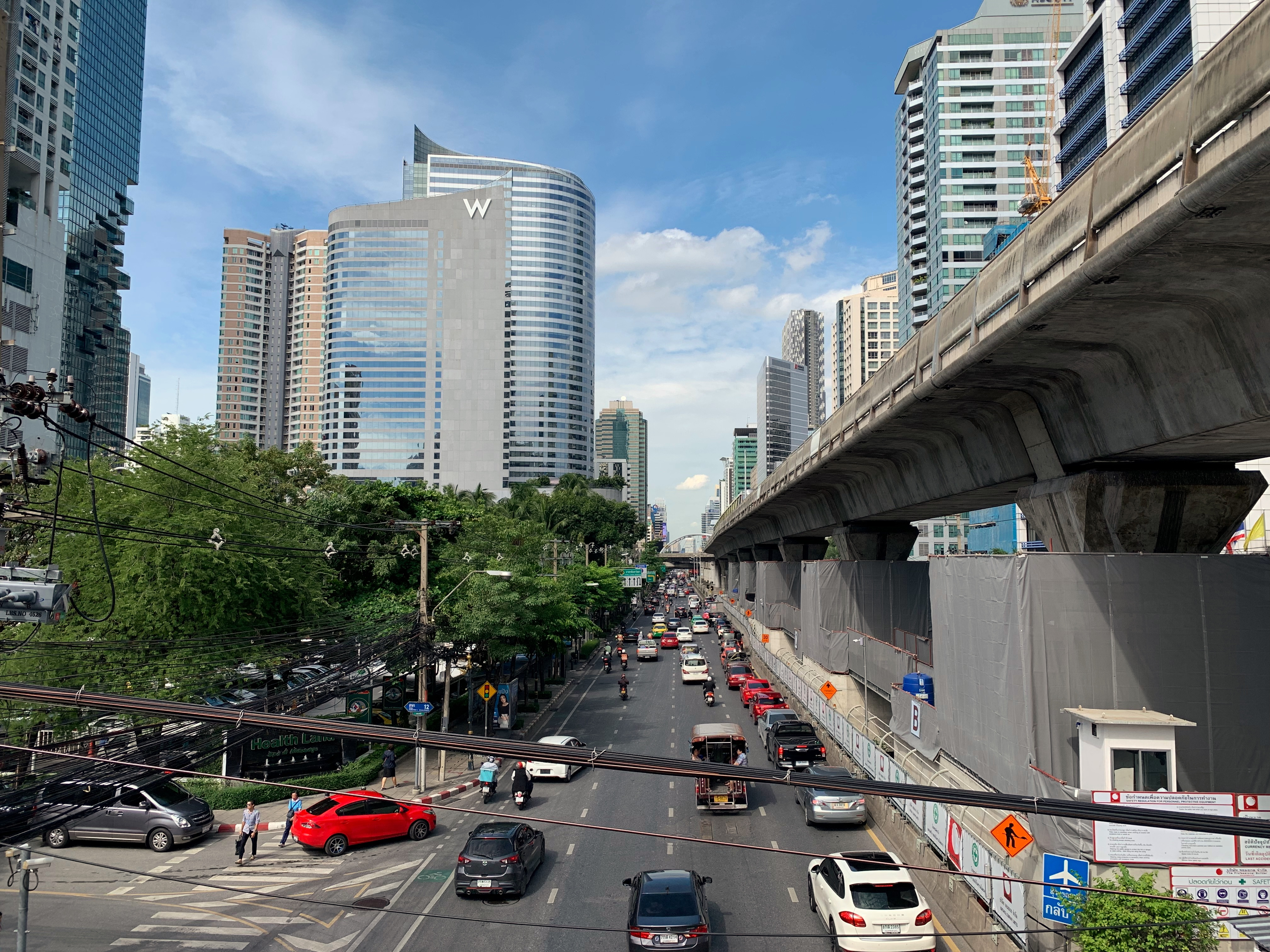
Sathon Road in 2019

Sathon Road (Thai: ถนนสาทร, RTGS: Thanon Sathon, pronounced [tʰā.nǒn sǎː.tʰɔ̄ːn]; also Sathorn or Satorn) is a major road that passes through the districts of Bang Rak and Sathon in central Bangkok, Thailand. It is an important transportation link between Phra Nakhon and Thonburi sides of Bangkok.

Sathon Road is lined with skyscrapers and corporate offices, especially banking and finance related. Thai and International banks such as SMBC and Citicorp have their headquarters located along Sathon Road. Numerous 40+ story luxury condominiums line the street, including The Met. It also has, along the South side, the embassies of Australia (37), Denmark (Soi 1), Germany (9), Malaysia (35), and Slovakia (25). The extensive Protestant Bangkok Bible College and a Roman Catholic church are in the south-west.

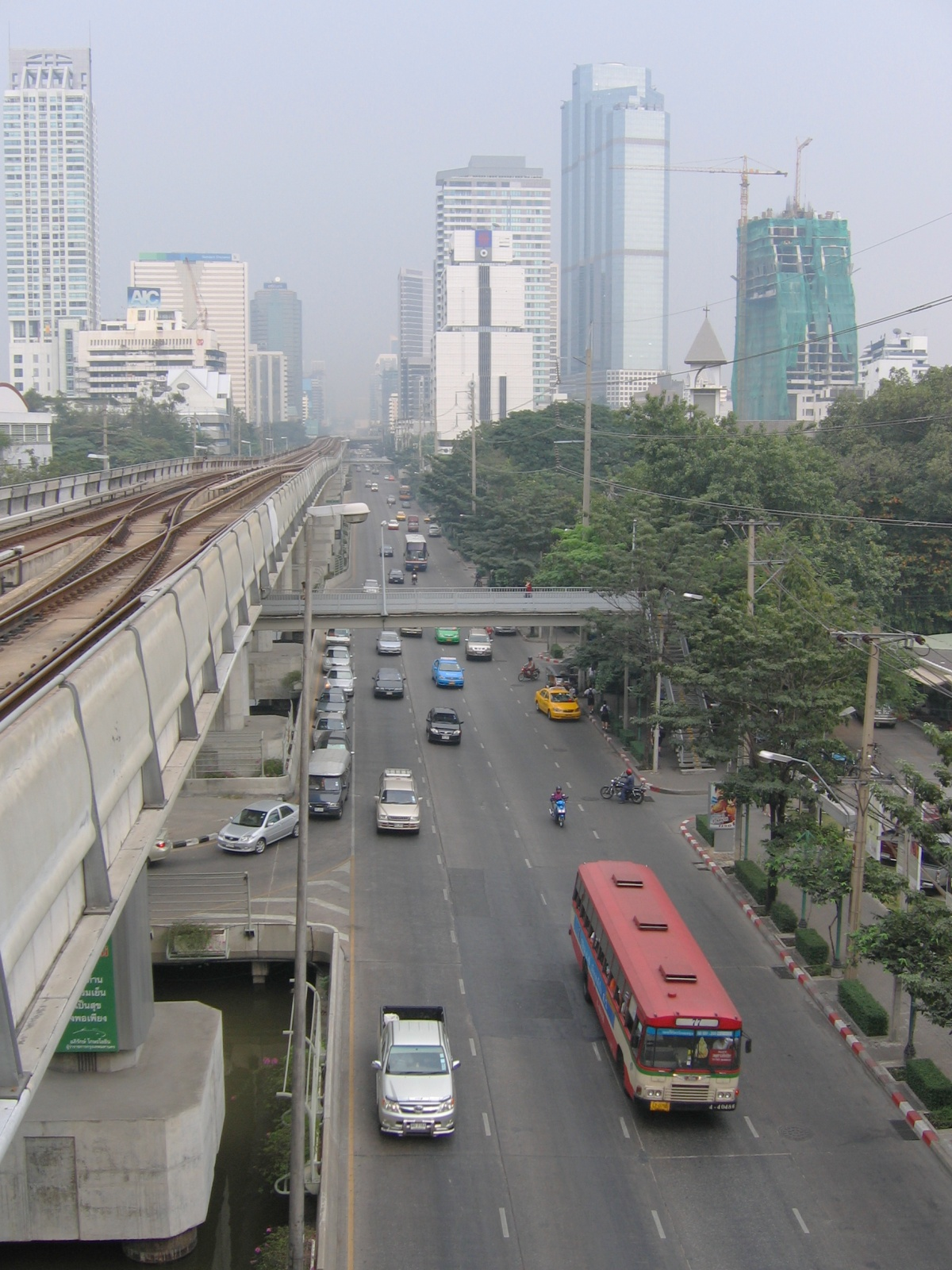
Aerial view of Sathon Tai Road in 2006

It consists of the eastbound Sathon Nuea Road (or North Sathon Road, belonging to Si Lom Subdistrict, Bang Rak District) and the westbound Sathon Tai Road (or South Sathon Road, belonging to Yan Nawa and Thung Maha Mek Subdistricts, Sathon District) separated by Khlong Sathon canal.

- On the south-western end of the roads is the Taksin Bridge, also commonly called Sathon Bridge, crossing the Chao Phraya River from Charoen Krung Road that borders the river. This end also has the Chao Phraya Express Boat CEN Sathon station, the terminus from which southern and northern line river-stations are numbered. Near this end the Si Rat Expressway (2nd State Expy) crosses at this end.
- The north-eastern end terminates at Rama IV Road, but continues as Witthayu Road (Wireless Road) where many embassies and ambassadors residences are located, their corner having Lumphini Market on the north-east side.

The Silom Line of the BTS Skytrain also runs along most part of this road with stations Surasak and Saphan Taksin. The skytrain extension to the other side of Chao Phraya River opened to public in May 2009. The MRT Blue Line, Lumphini Station is at the other end near Rama IV Road. The Bangkok BRT Sathorn station is located on Naradhiwas Rajanagarindra Road, linked to Chong Nonsi BTS station by a new bridge.

The intersection between Sathon and Naradhiwas Rajanagarindra Roads is a new commercial area filled with office buildings such as the Empire Tower.

The road has six roads in form of soi (alley) that can connect to Si Lom road in the north, consisted of (from the Taksin Bridge) Surasak, Pramuan, Pan, Naradhiwas Rajanagarindra, Convent, and Sala Daeng, respectively.

== Khlong Sathon ==
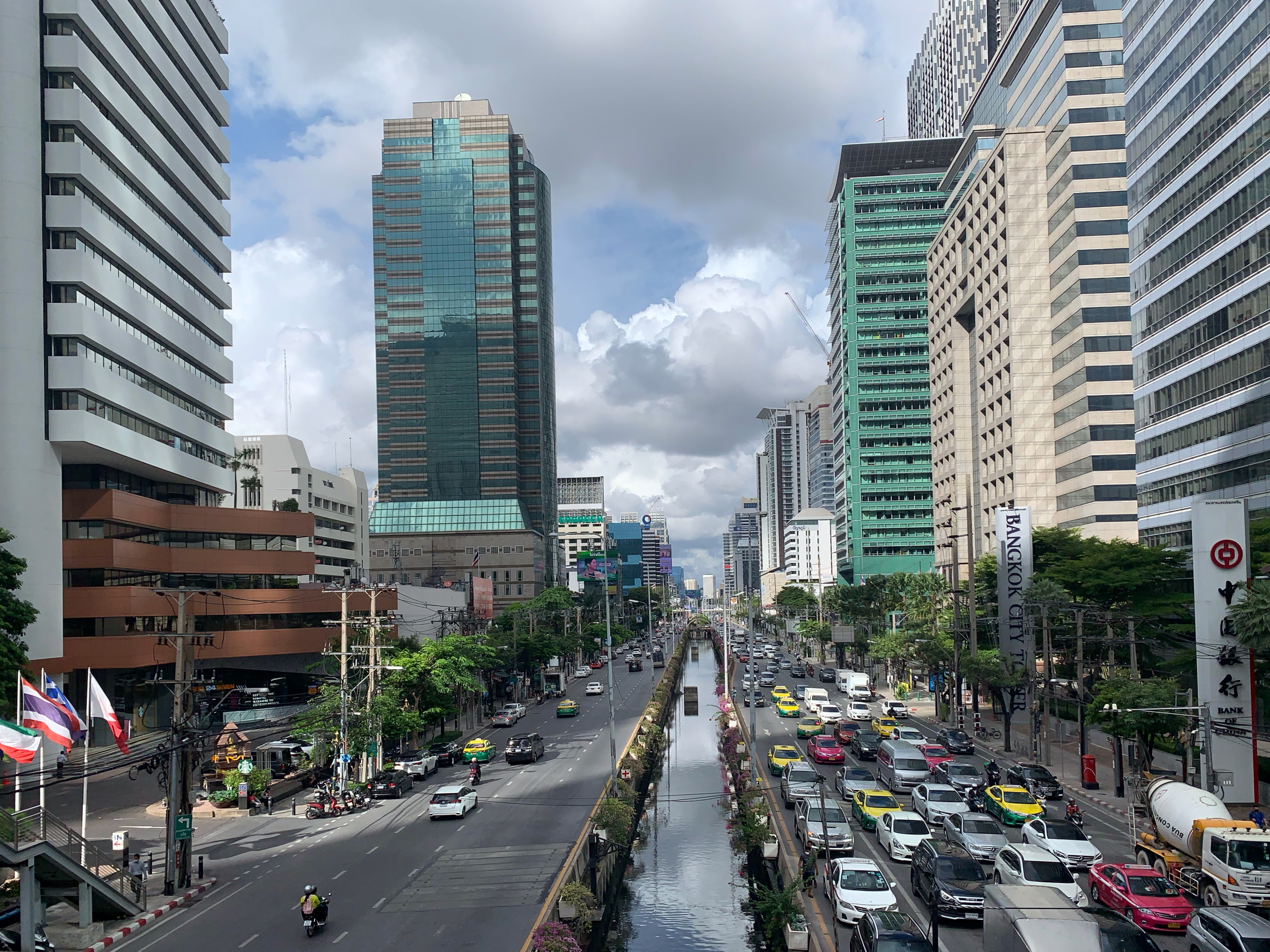
Khlong Sathon (in the middle), paralleling with Sathon Road

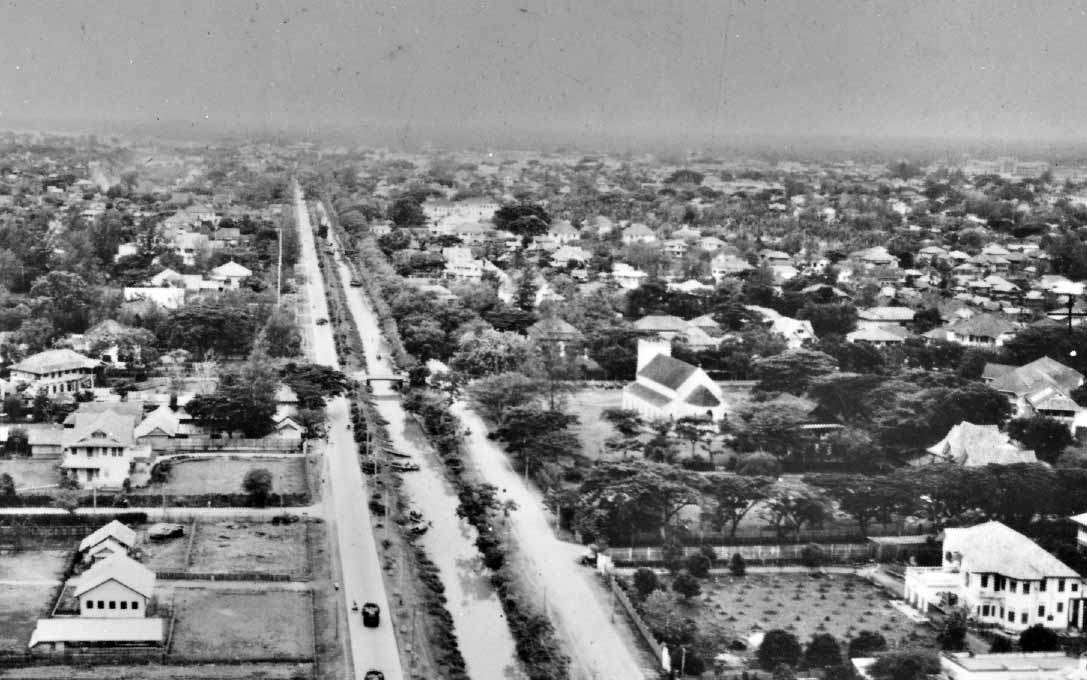
Khlong Sathon and Sathon Road in 1946

Khlong Sathon (Thai: คลองสาทร, pronounced [kʰlɔ̄ːŋ sǎ.tʰɔ̄ːn]) is a khlong (คลอง, canal) in downtown Bangkok, the origin of the road and the district names. Nowadays, it is just a small waterway amidst the tall buildings in Sathon quarter, the country's business and financial centre.

=== History ===
During the King Chulalongkorn (Rama V)'s reign, Luang Sathon Racha Yut (หลวงสาทรราชายุตก์), also known as Chao Sua Yom (เจ้าสัวยม), a wealthy businessman, was commissioned in 1892 to dig the canal linking Khlong Thanon Trong (now Rama IV Road) with the Chao Phraya River at a side of Wat Yannawa. The canal was 3.2 km (about 1 mi) long. Luang Sathon Racha Yut dug the canal passing the untidy area between Si Lom and Ban Wai Roads, he took the soil from the canal to fill for the road construction. Subsequently, he received the rights for the adjacent land along both sides of the canal. He then developed and divided the land into plots, 240 m^{2} each, sold to noblemen, foreigners, and the wealthy. This was regarded as the first land development project in Thailand.

The name Khlong Sathon was derived from Luang Sathon Racha Yut, the honour title which Chao Sua Yom received from King Chulalongkorn for his good deed developing the city. In the past, the land along both sides of the canal was lined with beautiful mansions, surrounded by large trees such as sea almond, rain trees, and mango trees. The mangoes were edible when ripe. At that time, Khlong Sathon extended to both sides of Witthayu Road and even connected to Khlong Saen Saep.

There used to be six boundary stones of Nai Lert between Khlong Saen Saep and Phloen Chit Road, which were used as mooring points for boats near the British Embassy. (Note: Nowadays, there is only one left at the northwest corner of Phloen Chit Intersection, where the Central Embassy is located.) Khlong Sathon was wider than it is today, and its water was clean and clear. Children enjoyed swimming in the canal, and a double-rope line was set up over the water for them to climb and play on. It was also a popular site for Loy Krathong celebrations.

After Taksin Bridge construction in 1982, the big trees were removed and Sathon Road were widened, shrinking the canal in the process.

=== Geography ===
Khlong Sathon starts from the eastern Chao Phraya River under Taksin Bridge near the Chaloem Phan 53 Bridge, on the border between Sathon and Bang Rak districts and continues along the length of Sathon Road. It bisects Sathon Road; North Sathon (ฺBang Rak district) and South Sathon (Sathon district), before terminating along with Sathon Road at Witthayu Intersection, a four-way intersection where Sathon combines Rama IV and Witthayu Roads, as well as the beginning of Witthayu Road on the tripoint between districts of Bang Rak, Sathon and Pathum Wan at the southeast corner of Lumphini Park.
