= Sunlong Bus =

Chinese bus manufacturer

Sunlong Bus 申龙客车
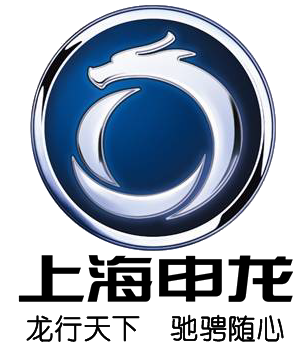
- Type: Public
- Industry: Commercial vehicles
- Predecessor: Daimler AG; Mercedes-Benz; Mitsubishi Fuso Trucks And Bus Corporation
- Founded: 13 April 2001; 25 years ago
- Headquarters: Shanghai, China
- Number of locations: 300 Stores (2019)
- Area served: Asia Europe Australia Oceania Africa except North And South America
- Products: Buses, Commercial vehicles
- Production output: 800,000 Vehicles (FY2018)
- Services: Auto Service
- Number of employees: 50
- Website: Sunlong Bus

Sunlong Bus (officially Shanghai Shenlong Bus Co., Ltd.) is a Chinese bus manufacturer based in Shanghai. It was established on 13 April 2001, and started export production on 2 February 2004.

== Models ==
Sunlong produced logistics vans, 6-7m minibuses, 8-9m city buses, 8-9m tourist buses, 10-12m city buses, and 10-12m tourist buses.

== Vans ==
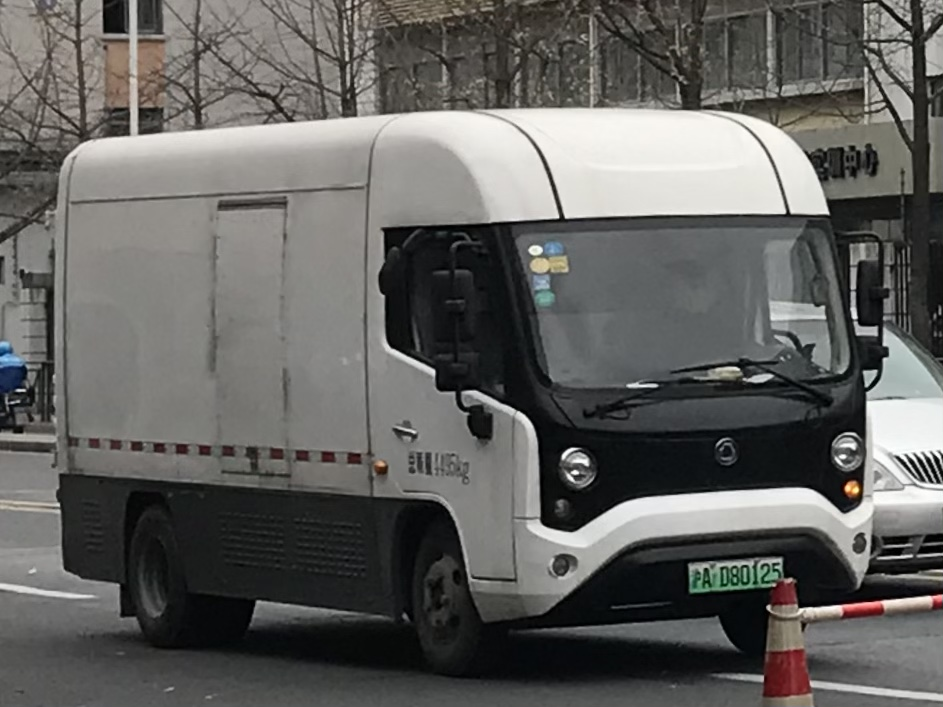
Sunlong Guangxi Yibian NEV electric logistics van

- SLK5030 van, based on the fourth generation Jinbei Haise.
- SLK5031 van, based on the DFSK K-Series
- SLK5032 van, Based on the Chery Q22
- Sunlong Guangxi Yibian NEV electric logistics van based on the Dongfeng captain EV400

== Buses ==
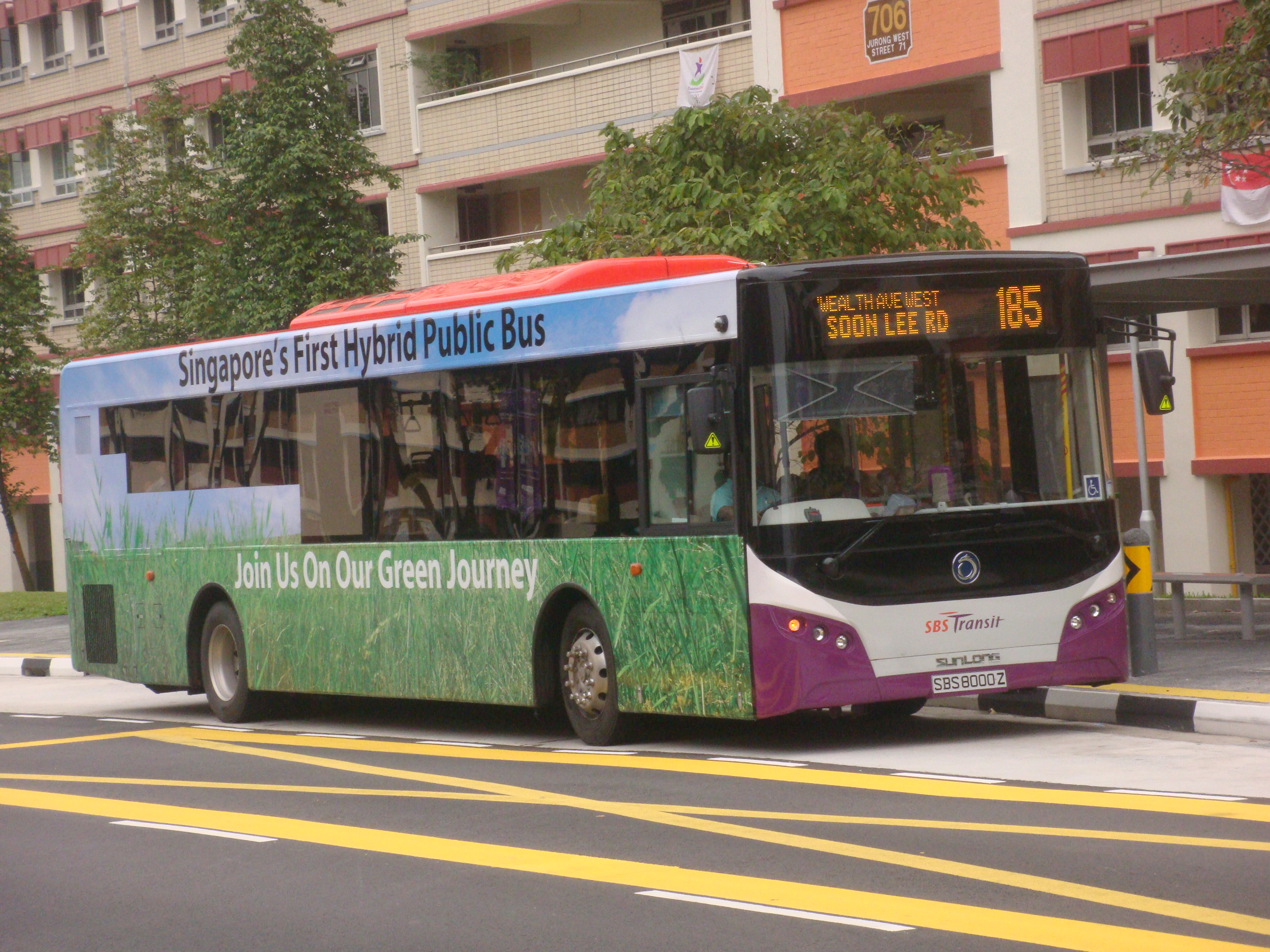
Sunlong Hybrid bus

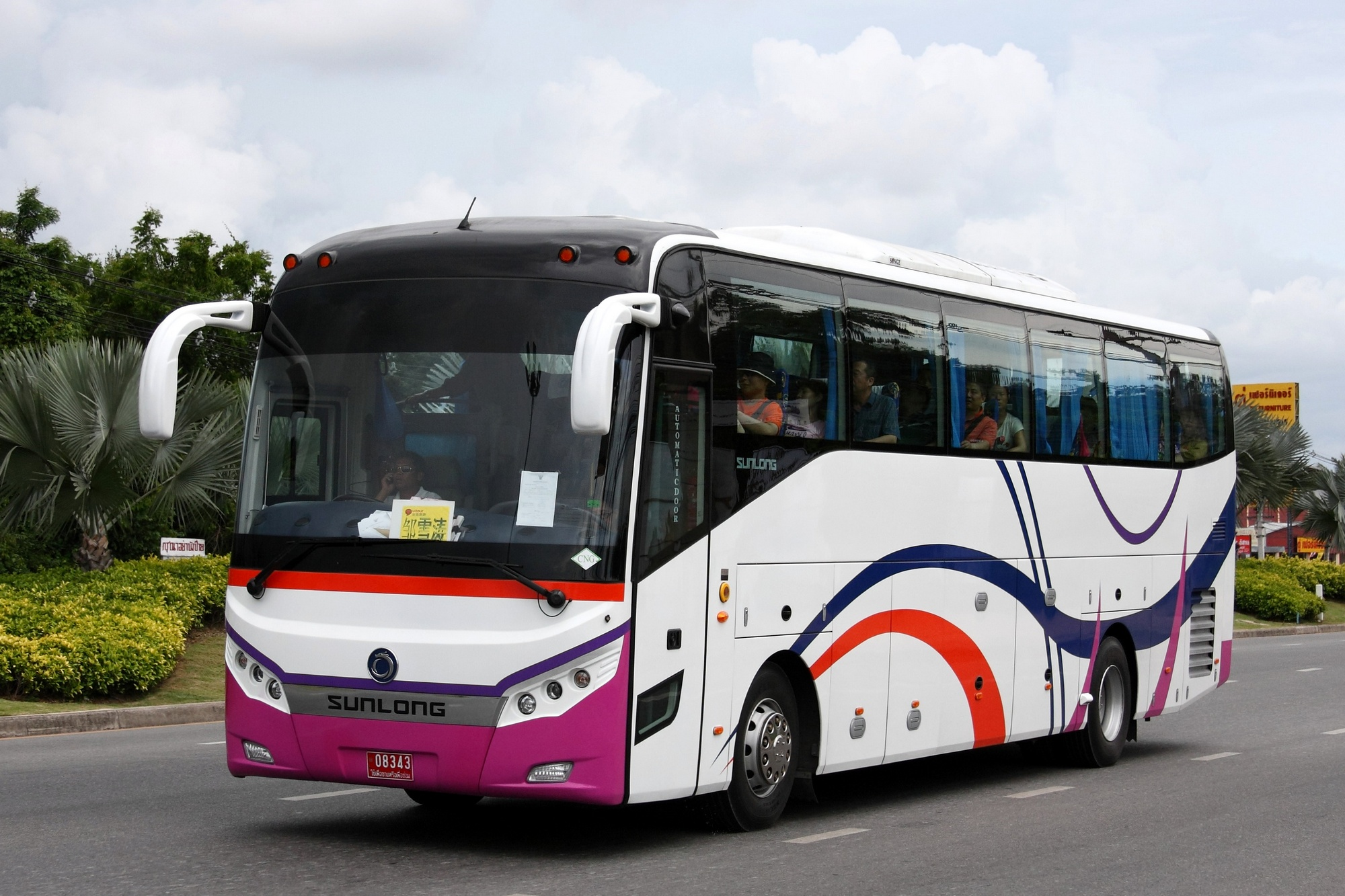
Sunlong SLK6126 in Pattaya

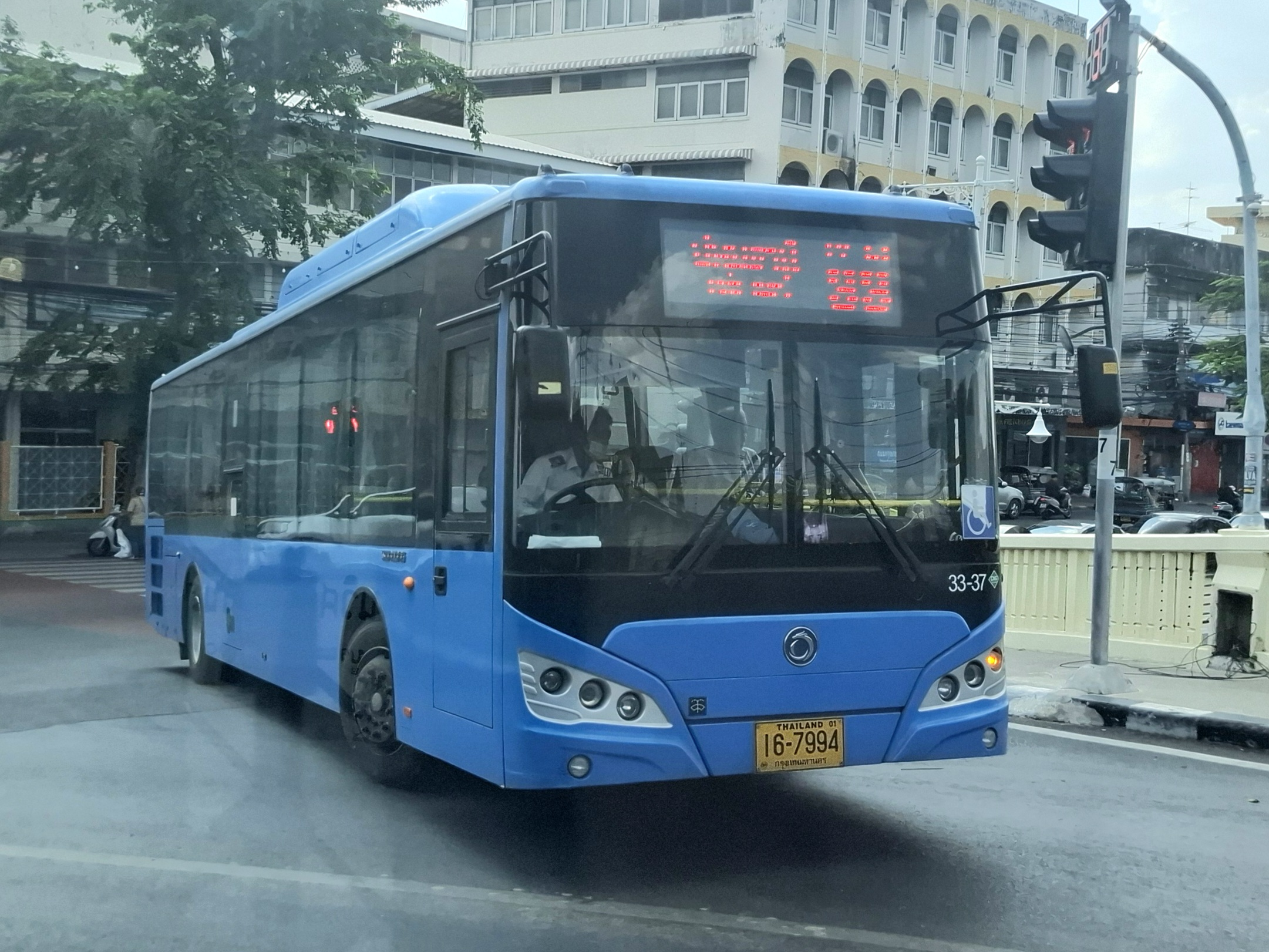
Sunlong SLK6129CNG (Bus 33 CO., LTD.)

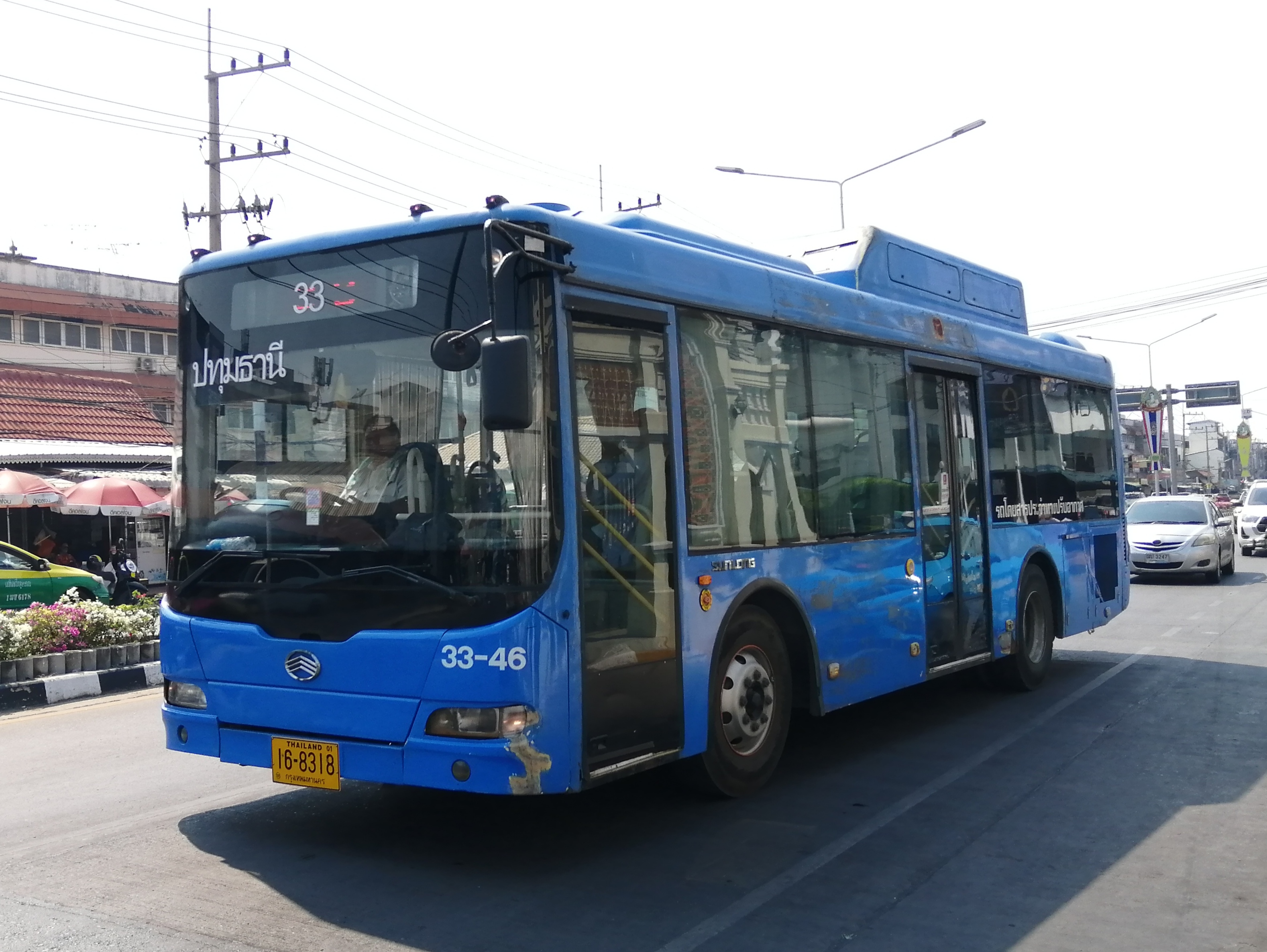
Sunlong SLK6985CNG (Bus 33 CO., LTD.)

- SLK5180XLJ Motor home
- SLK5228XLJ Motor home
- SLK6016 Tourist bus
- SLK6103 City bus
- SLK6105 City bus
- SLK6106 Tourist bus
- SLK6111 City bus
- SLK6113 City bus
- SLK6115 City bus
- SLK6116 Tourist bus
- SLK6120 Tourist bus
- SLK6122 City bus
- SLK6125 City bus
- SLK6126 Tourist bus
- SLK6129 City bus
- SLK6800XC School bus
- SLK6602 minibus
- SLK6702 minibus
- SLK6750 minibus
- SLK6750XC School bus
- SLK6753 City bus
- SLK6770 minibus
- SLK6800 City bus
- SLK6800 School bus
- SLK6802 Tourist bus
- SLK6840 Tourist bus
- SLK6872 School bus
- SLK6872 Tourist bus
- SLK6850 Tourist bus
- SLK6851 City bus
- SLK6855 City bus
- SLK6891 City bus
- SLK6900 Tourist bus
- SLK6902 Tourist bus
- SLK6905 City bus
- SLK6935 City bus
- SLK6970 City bus
- SLK6972 Tourist bus
- SLK6985 Tourist bus
- SLK6985 City Bus
