= Chulalongkorn University Centenary Park =

Park in Bangkok, Thailand

- อุทยาน 100 ปี จุฬาลงกรณ์มหาวิทยาลัย
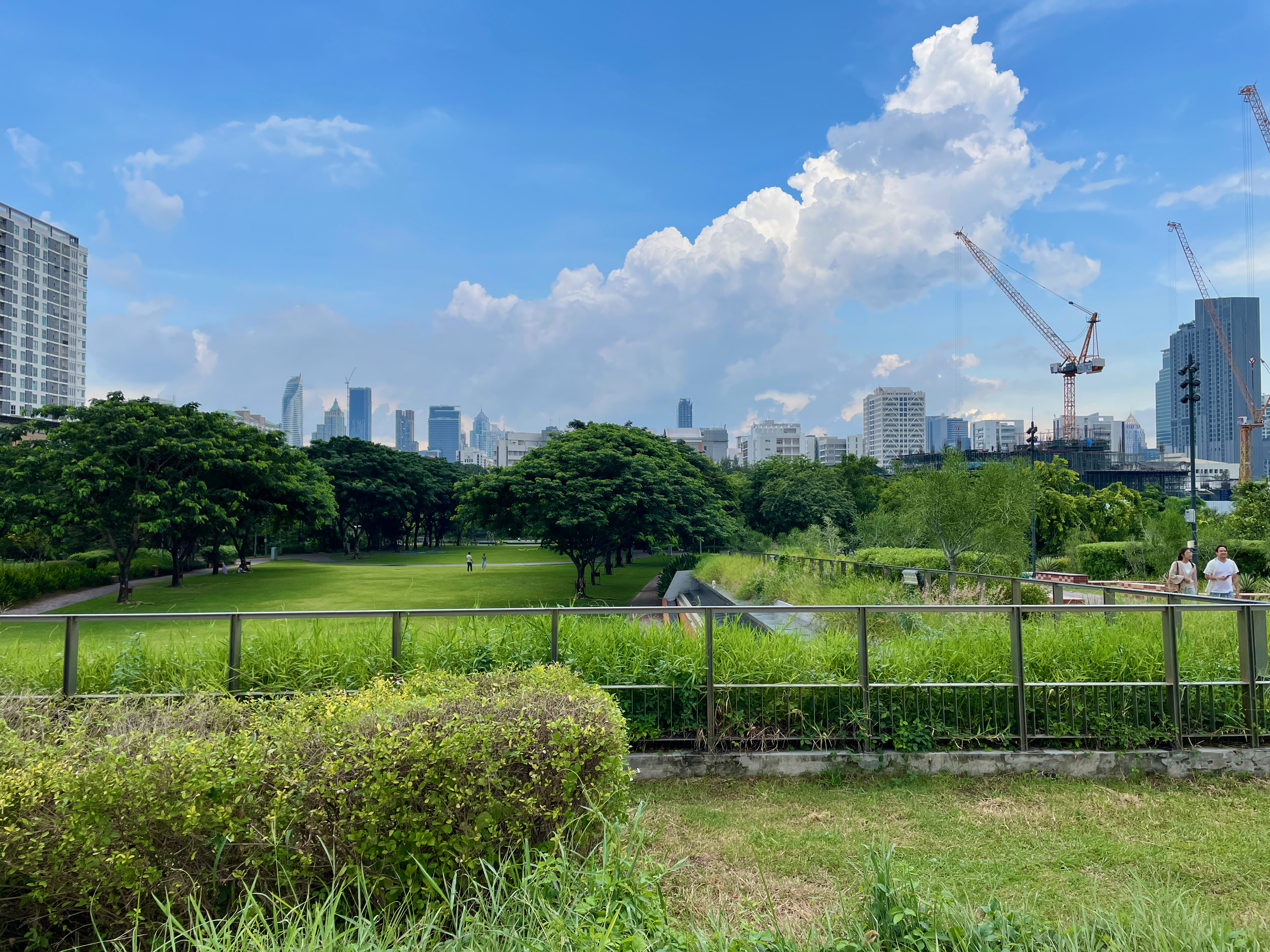
- Interactive map of Chulalongkorn University Centenary Park
- Type: Urban park
- Location: Chulalongkorn University, Bangkok, Thailand
- Coordinates: 13°44′21.9″N 100°31′27″E
- Area: 28-rai (4.5 ha; 11-acre)
- Opened: 2017

Chulalongkorn University Centenary Park (Thai: อุทยาน 100 ปี จุฬาลงกรณ์มหาวิทยาลัย) is a 28-rai (4.5 ha; 11-acre) park located on the campus of Chulalongkorn University in Bangkok, Thailand. It was completed in 2017 to honor the 100th anniversary of the university's founding. Designed by landscape architecture firm Landprocess, Centenary Park was designed to serve as a rainwater detention basin, partially inspired by the late King Bhumibol Adulyadej's monkey cheeks project.

== History ==
Climate change affects every part of the world, including Bangkok. One of the main problems facing the city is rising sea levels, which increase the risk of flooding and contribute to the city's gradual subsidence.

In 2012, Chulalongkorn University launched a public park design competition. It was the first time in 30 years of rapid urban development that a centrally located 11-acre plot of land, including a 1.3-kilometer stretch of road and valued at an estimated US$700 million, was designated as public green space rather than for commercial development.

The park opened in 2017. It was designed with various ecological components that reflect an approach to adapting to and managing the city's relationship with water, rather than fearing it. The park is also an important example of green infrastructure in Bangkok, helping to mitigate ecological issues and disaster risks while providing an opportunity for people to learn how to live with water.

== Design and Environmental Features ==
=== Green Roof and Landscape ===
The park features a large green roof that slopes gently upward from ground level to cover an exhibition space and earth-sheltered facilities beneath a layer of native grasses and vegetation. Across the entire 11-acre (28-rai) site, hundreds of resilient native plant and tree species were selected to restore local urban ecology and minimize irrigation requirements. By integrating the sloping green roof with the surrounding lawns and pedestrian paths, the design blends built architecture with the natural landscape.

=== Rainwater Management ===
A network of planted rain gardens and bioretention swales lines the park's sloped corridors, using gravity to direct stormwater runoff through planted areas for filtration and collection. This runoff is directed into underground storage tanks situated below the green roof, with a capacity that can hold up to 250,000 gallons of water for dry-season landscape irrigation. By slowing, absorbing, and retaining excessive precipitation on-site, the system reduces the volume of runoff entering Bangkok's municipal drainage network.

=== Water Management Areas ===
At the park's lowest elevation, a large retention pond is engineered to expand into an overflow detention basin during heavy monsoon downpours. Before entering the pond, runoff filters through constructed wetlands, where native aquatic plants bioremediate and clean the water. Beyond serving as flood-resilient infrastructure inspired by traditional water retention concepts, this integrated system naturally cools the surrounding urban microclimate and offers a replicable model for flood-prone, sinking delta cities.

== Activity ==
=== Exercise and Recreation ===
Pedestrian paths and elevated wooden walkways weave throughout the park's sloped terrain, providing routes for daily walking and jogging. Visitors actively use the designated fitness stations. The expansive, gently inclined central lawn also accommodates varied outdoor recreation, from frisbee tosses to group yoga and stretching sessions in the early mornings and late afternoons.

=== Relaxation and Community Activities ===
Lined with native trees and tiered seating steps along the retention pond, the park offers peaceful spots where visitors can sit, read, and unwind away from central Bangkok's dense traffic. Families and groups of friends regularly spread out picnic mats across the open lawn to socialize, eat, and view the city skyline during sunset. The grounds also function as a vibrant hub for student gatherings, university club workshops, open-air cultural showcases, and pet-friendly community meetups.

== Location ==
- Address / Street: Chulalongkorn 5 Road (Soi Chula 5), Wang Mai, Pathum Wan District, Bangkok, Thailand.

It was established on March 26, 2017, by Chulalongkorn University. It was named in commemoration of the 100th anniversary (Centenary) of Chulalongkorn University (1917–2017), which was originally established by King Vajiravudh (Rama VI) in honor of his father, King Chulalongkorn (Rama V).

== Event ==
=== Concerts in the Park — Annual Seasonal Series (January – February) ===
During the cooler winter months, the park transforms into an open-air amphitheater for free public music performances. Organized frequently by the Bangkok Metropolitan Administration (BMA) in partnership with ensembles such as the Royal Bangkok Symphony Orchestra (RBSO) and local university bands, these concerts take advantage of the park's gently sloping central lawn. Attendees gather with picnic mats on weekend evenings to enjoy classical symphonies, jazz, and contemporary Thai pop in a relaxed, family-friendly setting.

=== Chula Sustainability Fest & University Exhibitions — Annual ===
Organized by Chulalongkorn University and the Property Management of Chulalongkorn University (PMCU), this flagship annual festival—typically held between August and December—spotlights environmental consciousness and green living. Centered on the park's role as an urban wetland and flood-mitigation retention basin, the festival features interactive sustainability workshops, climate talks, green craft markets, and student-led design showcases aimed at bridging campus research with community action.

=== Rotating Art Installations & Pop-Up Markets — Ongoing Throughout the Year ===
Rather than sticking to a fixed calendar, PMCU frequently curates temporary commercial, design, and cultural activations across the park grounds. These range from large-scale inflatable art and interactive light installations to seasonal pop-up markets and curated art-toy showcases. Because the open lawns and water retention areas easily accommodate dynamic spatial designs, the venue continuously rotates exhibitions that draw visitors from the adjacent Banthat Thong cultural and dining corridor.

-Upcoming seasonal schedules, dates, and registration details for these events are announced via the PMCU (Property Management of Chulalongkorn University) official channels and the park's community updates.

== Fauna ==
Birds According to citizen-science documentation recorded on eBird, dozens of avian species have been recorded within Chulalongkorn University Centenary Park, highlighting substantial biodiversity in the dense urban landscape of central Bangkok. Resident bird species commonly observed foraging in the mid-story canopy, lawns, and tree lines include the streak-eared bulbul (Pycnonotus conradi), oriental magpie-robin (Copsychus saularis), Asian koel (Eudynamys scolopaceus), and zebra dove (Geopelia striata). In addition, the park's retention pond and constructed wetlands support a variety of aquatic and wading wildlife; species such as the Chinese pond heron (Ardeola bacchus), little egret (Egretta garzetta), and common kingfisher (Alcedo atthis) have been observed utilizing the freshwater shallows. Documented as part of Chulalongkorn University's sustainability framework, the park acts as a green stepping-stone and ecological corridor, providing essential food, shelter, and stopover habitat for both resident and migratory birds within the broader urban ecosystem.

Other Animals and Insects Beyond birdlife, the park's multi-tiered hydraulic landscape supports a variety of terrestrial and aquatic fauna. Insect populations are particularly active around flowering native plants; pollinators such as honeybees (Apis spp.), stingless bees (Meliponini), and butterflies including the lime butterfly (Papilio demoleus) and plain tiger (Danaus chrysippus) can be found feeding on nectar along the sloped bioswales. Dragonflies and damselflies are likewise prominent across the open water surface. Small animals inhabit multiple vertical layers of the park: variable squirrels (Callosciurus finlaysonii) occupy tree canopies, oriental garden lizards (Calotes versicolor) dwell along vegetated borders, and Asian water monitor lizards (Varanus salvator) thrive alongside freshwater fish in the retention basin. This assemblage demonstrates the interdependent relationship between animals, plants, and the environment: native wetland plants and biofiltration swales purify urban runoff, stabilizing water quality to maintain a viable micro-habitat for urban wildlife.

== Flora ==
Trees and Plants The flora of Chulalongkorn University Centenary Park is structured across distinct micro-environments, featuring over 300 plant varieties that include both newly planted trees and preserved mature specimens. At the highest elevation of the site, an extensive green roof consists of drought-tolerant native vegetation, including native grasses, herbs, and low-maintenance groundcovers. Along the park's inclined central spine, the vegetation transitions into sloped rain gardens and engineered bioswales planted with moisture-loving herbaceous perennials, ferns, and native wetland reeds that filter runoff. Encircling the detention lawns and lining the perimeter avenues, the canopy consists of shade trees such as rain trees (Samanea saman)—the official symbol tree of Chulalongkorn University—along with diverse tropical broadleaf species. At the lowest elevation, the constructed wetland and retention pond are covered with emergent aquatic plants, rushes, and floating macrophytes adapted to fluctuating water levels.

Environmental Benefits As a core component of Chulalongkorn University's ecological urbanism, the park functions as a living urban forest that delivers critical regulating ecosystem services to central Bangkok. The dense canopy and green corridor provide shade for pedestrian pathways and recreational lawns, substantially enhancing outdoor thermal comfort in a tropical climate. Through extensive plant transpiration and canopy interception, the vegetation helps to reduce the urban heat island effect, lowering localized surface and ambient air temperatures compared to surrounding built-up asphalt corridors. Furthermore, this continuous ecological matrix supports urban biodiversity by establishing vital feeding and nesting niches for pollinators and wildlife, while simultaneously sequestering carbon, filtering particulate matter from street traffic, and purifying urban stormwater runoff.

== Transportation ==
=== Public Transportation ===
- Chulalongkorn Centenary Park is located near Chulalongkorn University in the Pathum Wan area of Bangkok. Visitors using the BTS Skytrain can get off at National Stadium Station or Siam Station and continue to the park by walking or using local transportation. The nearest MRT station is Sam Yan Station, Exit 2, from which visitors can walk to the park.
- The park is also accessible by several public bus routes. Buses operating around Chulalongkorn University include 11, 25, 54, 73, 73ก, 79, and 204 along Rama I Road; 21, 34, 47, 50, 67, 93, and 141 along Rama IV Road; and 27, 29, 36, 36ก, 65, and 501 along Phaya Thai Road. Visitors can get off at the Sam Yan or National Stadium bus stops and continue to the park.
- Chulalongkorn University also provides the CU Shuttle Bus (CU Pop Bus), a free electric shuttle service for transportation around the university. Route 6 directly serves CU Centenary Park, connecting it with Stadium One, CU iHouse, I'm Park, Sam Yan Market, Samyan Mitrtown, and BTS National Stadium Station. The shuttle operates Monday to Saturday from 7:00 AM to 7:00 PM.
