= Chong Nonsi Canal Park =

Park in Bangkok, Thailand

Coordinates: 13°43′13″N 100°31′52″E

- สวนสาธารณะคลองช่องนนทรี
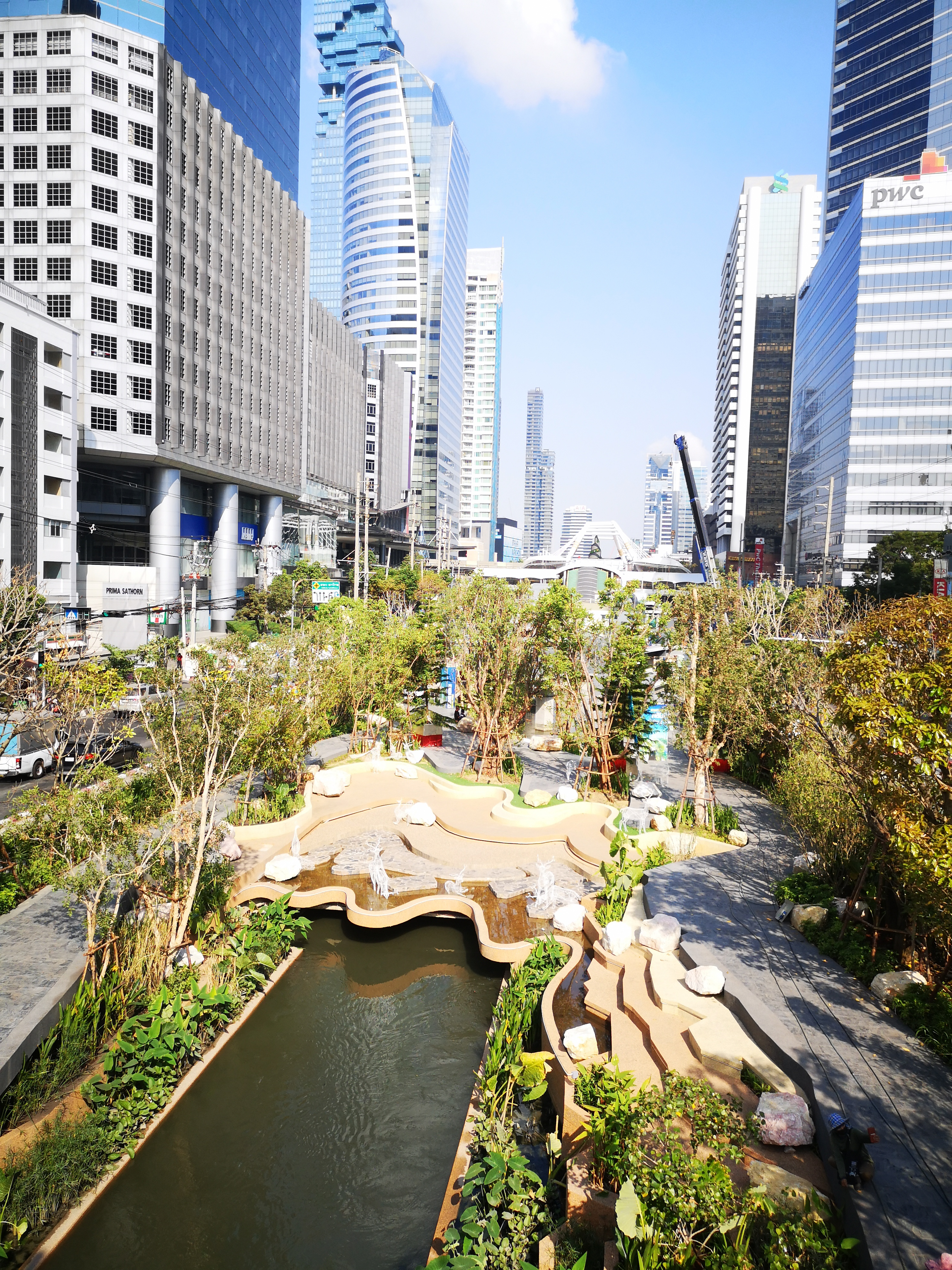
- Interactive map of Chong Nonsi Canal Park
- Type: Urban linear park; public park
- Location: Khlong Chong Nonsi, Bangkok
- Area: A linear 200 m (656.2 ft) stretch of Chong Nonsi Canal
- Opened: December 25, 2021

Chong Nonsi Canal Park (Thai: สวนสาธารณะคลองช่องนนทรี) is a linear park in Khlong Chong Nonsi, Bangkok. Designed by Thai landscape architecture firm Landprocess, the first of five phases of the park opened in December 2021. The project was partially inspired by Cheonggyecheon in Seoul, and when completed will be Bangkok's longest park at 4.5 kilometres (2.8 mi) on both sides of the canal.
