= Talat Phlu subdistrict =

Talat Phlu ตลาดพลู
- Khwaeng
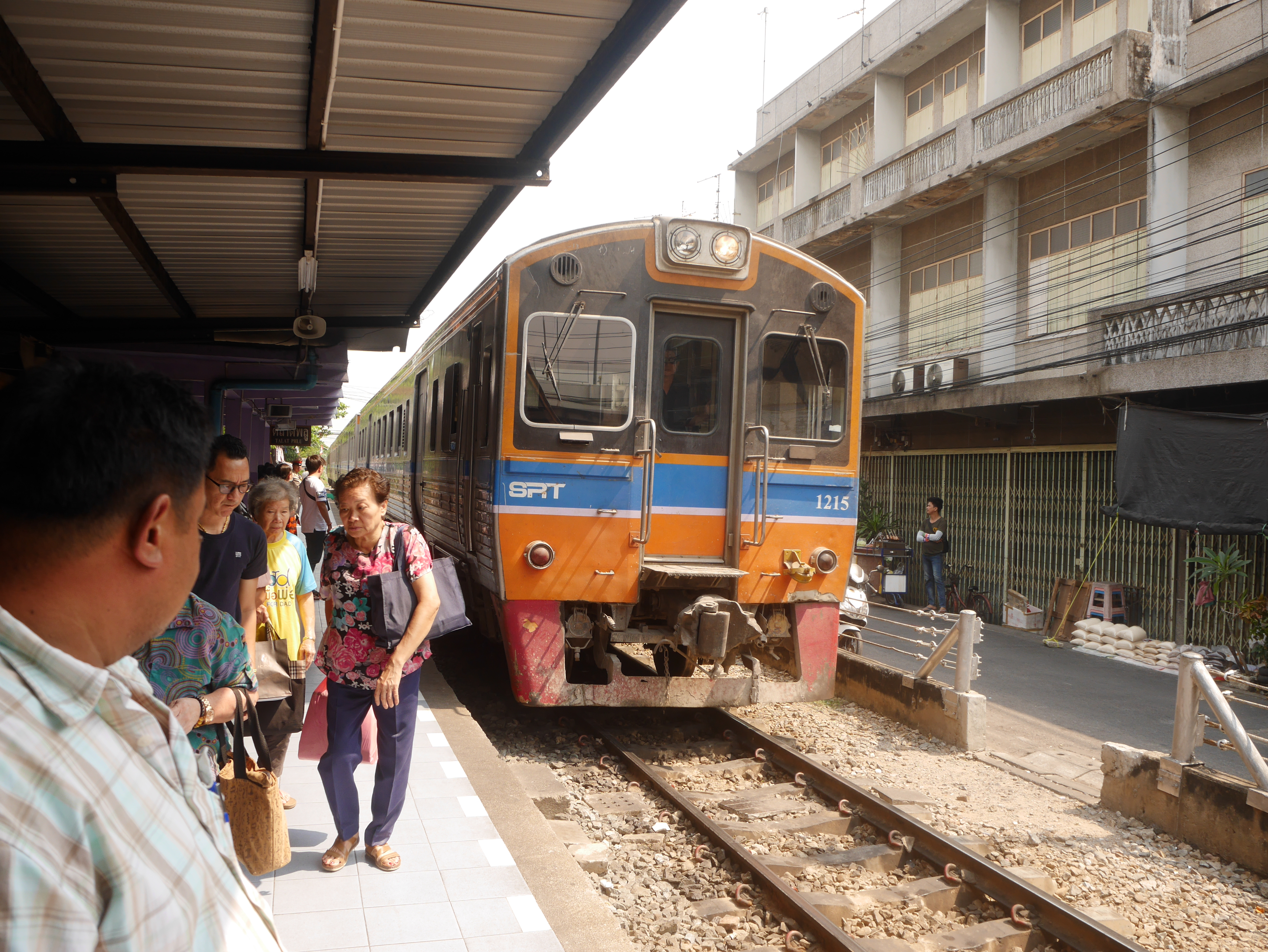
- Talat Phlu railway station in 2019

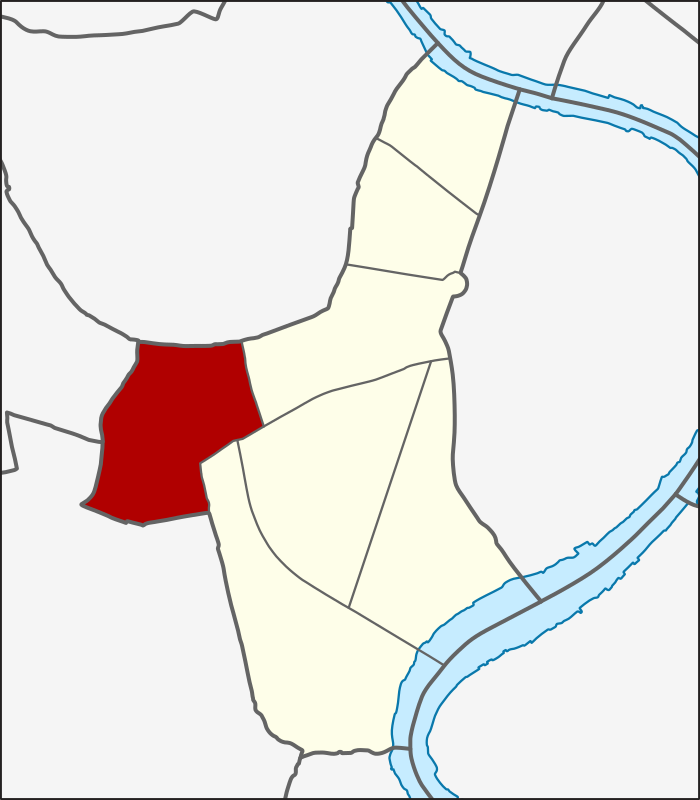
- Location in Thon Buri district
- Country: Thailand
- Province: Bangkok
- Khet: Thon Buri

Area
  - Total: 1.823 km^{2} (0.704 sq mi)

Population (2021)
  - Total: 14,496
  - Density: 7,951.73/km^{2} (20,594.9/sq mi)
- Time zone: UTC+7 (ICT)
- Postal code: 10600
- TIS 1099: 101505

Talat Phlu (Thai: ตลาดพลู, pronounced [tā.làːt pʰlūː]) is a khwaeng (sub-district) in Thon Buri district, Bangkok. It encompasses a historic district and a bustling day and night marketplace known as Talat Phlu.

== Geography ==
Neighbouring subdistricts are (from the north clockwise): Wat Tha Phra in Bangkok Yai district (Khlong Bangkok Yai is a borderline), Bang Yi Ruea in its district (Khlong Bang Nam Chon is a borderline), Bukkhalo and Dao Khanong in its district with Bang Kho of Chom Thong district (Ratchaphruek road, Khlong Bang Sakae, Khlong Yaek Bang Sakae 13 and Khlong Wat Mai Yai Nui 1 are the borderlines), Bang Kho of Chom Thong district and Pak Khlong Phasi Charoen of Phasi Charoen district (Khlong Dan is a borderline), respectively.

Talat Phlu has a total area of 1.823 km^{2} (about 0.703 mi^{2}).

== Demography ==
Talat Phlu had a total population of 15,440 people and 14,735 households (December 2020).
