= Wat Chantharam Worawihan =

- Wat Klang
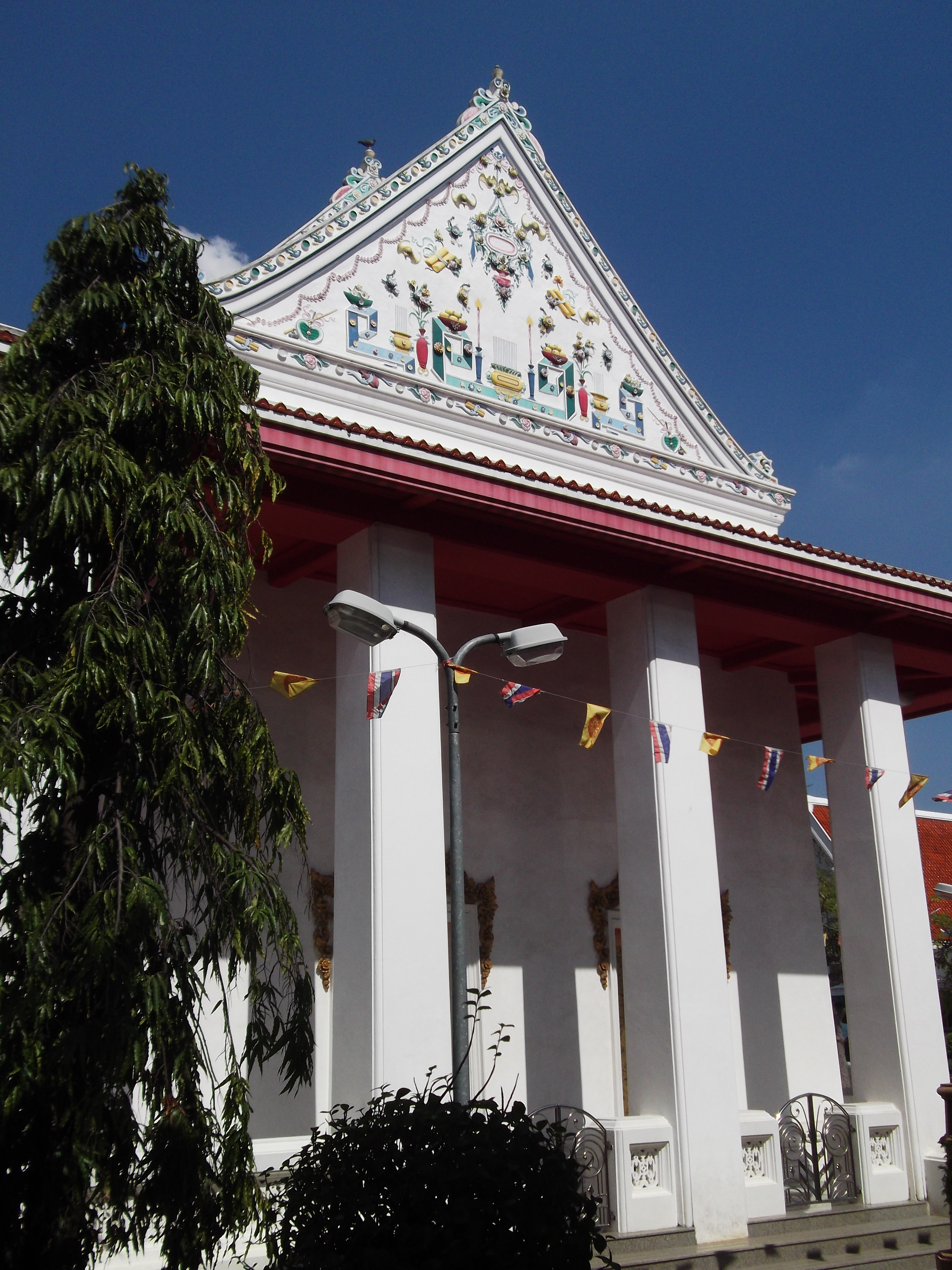
- The ubosot

- Location within Bangkok

Religion
- Affiliation: Buddhism
- Sect: Theravāda Mahā Nikāya
- Status: Third-class royal monastery

Location
- Location: 276 Thoet Thai rd, Bang Yi Ruea, Thon Buri, Bangkok 10600
- Country: Thailand
- Interactive map of Wat Chantharam Worawihan
- Coordinates: 13.722605°N 100.481171°E

Wat Chantharam Worawihan (Thai: วัดจันทรารามวรวิหาร, often shortened to Wat Chantharam) is a historic third-level royal monastery in the Worawihan type in Bangkok.

== History ==
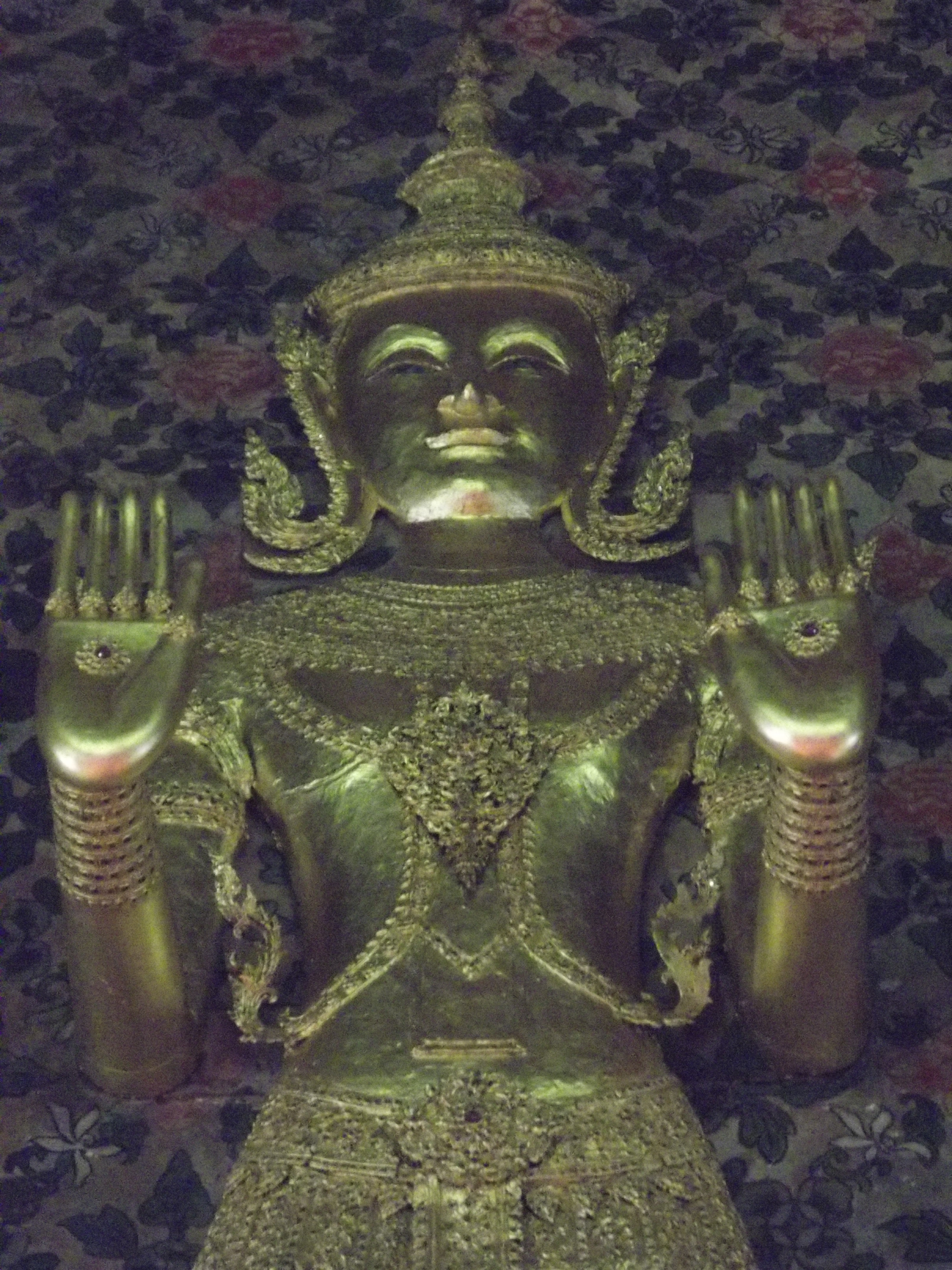
Buddha image in pacifying ocean posture

It was built in the Ayutthaya period, originally it was called Wat Bang Yi Ruea Klang (วัดบางยี่เรือกลาง) or known locally as Wat Klang (วัดกลาง), because it was flanked by two other temples, Wat Intharam and Wat Rajkrueh. Hence the name. (Note: The word Klang literally means "middle" or "central".)

Later in the King Rama III's reign of the early Rattanakosin period, it was renovated by nobleman Phraya Surasena (Khun Nen) and its new name was given by the king and it was elevated to the status of royal monastery of the Worawihan type.

The overall architecture of the temple is Chinese style, without ornated decorative pieces. The vihara (sanctuary) structure was once made of brick and mortar and it was restored to a reinforced concrete during the time of the renovation of the ubosot (ordination hall). A number of ancient Buddha images are enshrined interior. When the ubosot was in a state of disrepair. The abbot Phra Wisutthiwaraphon had it renovated in 1974 and the renovation was completed in 1977. It structure was changed to reinforced concrete like the vihara.

The principle Buddha image made of brass in the stance of subduing Mara. Another striking Buddha image is a high-relief crowned Buddha image made of teak covered by tin. The image depicts the stance of pacifying the ocean. The Fine Arts Department registered this image as national heritage. In addition, the walls and ceiling of the ubosot there are also very beautiful and refined Chinese mural paintings.

== Temple market ==
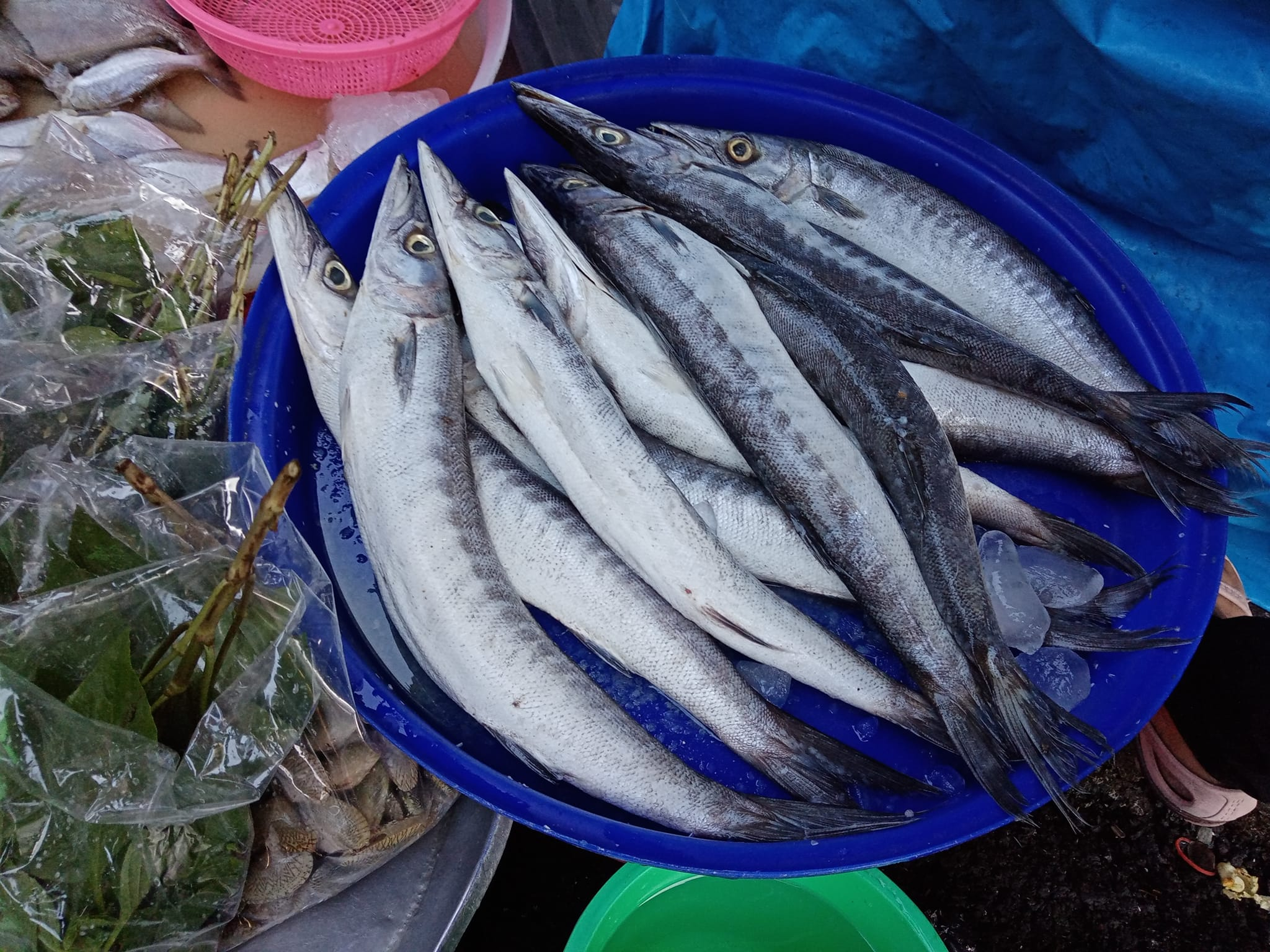
Fresh barracuda for sale at Talat Wat Klang

The area around the temple is a bustling place for the local morning traditional market known as Talat Wat Klang (ตลาดวัดกลาง), considered part of Talat Phlu. Also, the market bordered the canal Khlong Bangkok Yai. In the past, it was a condition of floating market where all the vendors rowing boats selling their products.

A wide variety of products are sold including fresh produce, dry goods, seafood, ready-to-eat food, Thai sweets, and clothing. The entrance to the market is in Soi Thoet Thai 12, both sides are lined with shophouses selling retro products. The area of the market still extends to cover nearby temples, Wat Intharam and Wat Rajkrueh as well.

The market is opens daily from 12.00 am to 12.00 pm.
