= Samre, Bangkok =

Coordinates: 13°42′34.6″N 100°29′29.44″E

Samre สำเหร่
- Khwaeng
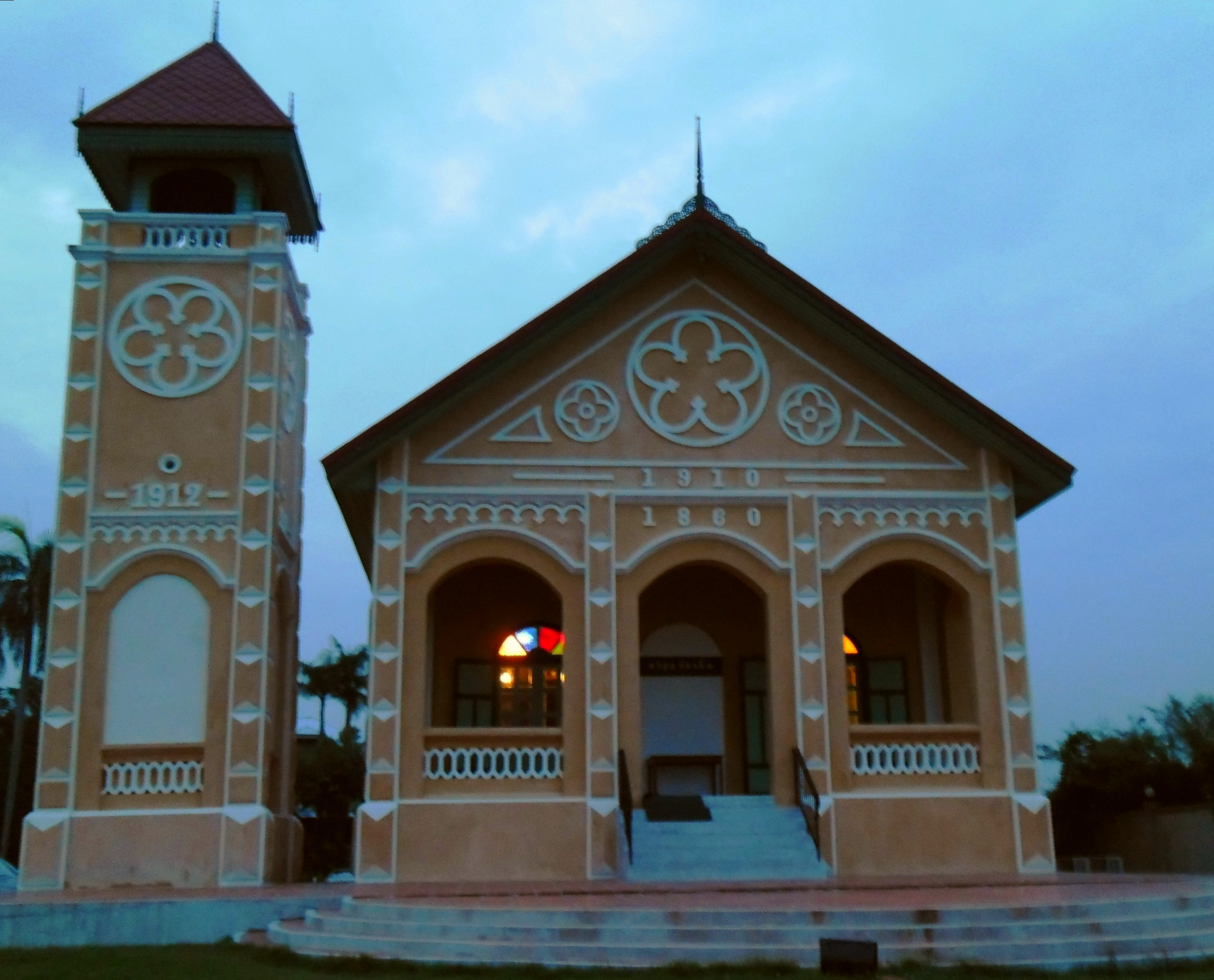
- First Presbyterian Church, Samray

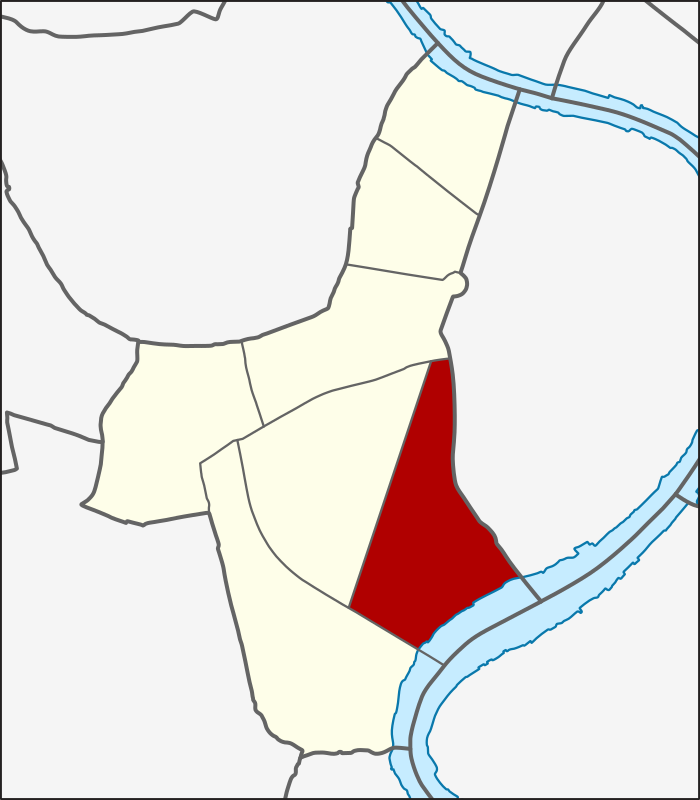
- Location in Thon Buri District
- Country: Thailand
- Province: Bangkok
- Khet: Thon Buri

Area
  - Total: 1.230 km^{2} (0.475 sq mi)

Population (2019)
  - Total: 14,937
  - Density: 12,143.9/km^{2} (31,453/sq mi)
- Postal code: 10600
- TIS 1099: 101507

Samre (Thai: สำเหร่, pronounced [sǎm.rèː]), also spelled Sam Re and Samray, is a subdistrict (khwaeng) of Thon Buri District, Bangkok, Thailand. It is also the name of a neighbourhood around the area.

== History ==
The word samre is a name for the plant Malabar melastome (also known as khlongkhleng), which probably used to grow in abundance in the area, leading the neighbourhood to be known by the name. It was also the name of a Buddhist temple (wat) in the area, Wat Samre, believed to have been built around 1717 and now known as Wat Ratchawarin.

Samre used to be a site of public executions during the late seventeenth to early eighteenth centuries, where prisoners were beheaded and their heads set on spikes by the riverside. It was a place locals feared to be heavily haunted, and is described as such in Nirat Thalang, a travel poem written c. 1815–1816 by Muen Phromsomphatson, a student of Sunthorn Phu.

In the 1850s, a plot of land in the area was purchased by American missionary Stephen Mattoon, and it became the location of the First Presbyterian Church, Samray as well as Samray Boys' School, the country's first formal school.

== Geography ==
Samre is in the southeastern corner of Thon Buri District.

Samre is bounded by other subdistricts (from north clockwise): Bang Yi Ruea in its district (Krung Thonburi Road is a borderline), Bang Lamphu Lang in Khlong San District (Khlong Bang Sai Kai is a borderline), Wat Phraya Krai and Bang Kho Laem in Bang Kho Laem District with Dao Khanong in its district (Chao Phraya River and Mahaisawan Road are the borderlines), Bukkhalo in its district (Somdet Phra Chao Tak Sin Road is a borderline).

== Places ==
- First Presbyterian Church, Samray
- Samre Police Station
- Bukkhalo Police Station
- Samre Post Office
- Wat Bang Nam Chon
- Samitivej Thonburi Hospital (formerly Krungdhon 1 Hospital)
- Rama III Bridge (New Krungthep Bridge, Krungthep 2 Bridge)

The local temple Wat Samre, or Wat Ratchawarin, indeed, it is located in the area of neighbouring Bukkhalo.
