= Bukkhalo =

Coordinates: 13°42′50.9″N 100°28′49.7″E

Bukkhalo บุคคโล
- Khwaeng
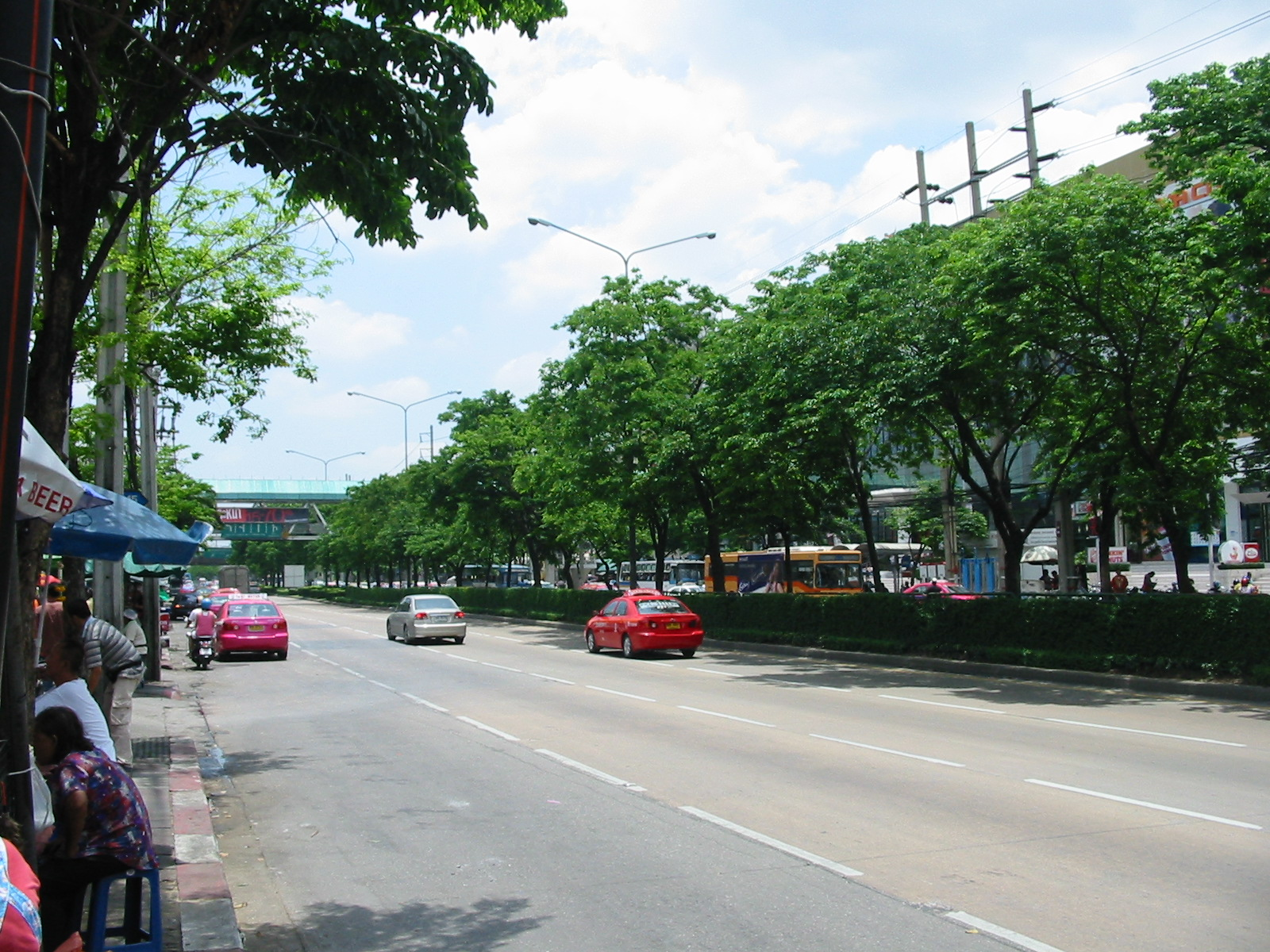
- Ratchadaphisek Road in 2008 as seen from Dao Khanong, the opposite side is The Mall Tha Phra in Bukkhalo.

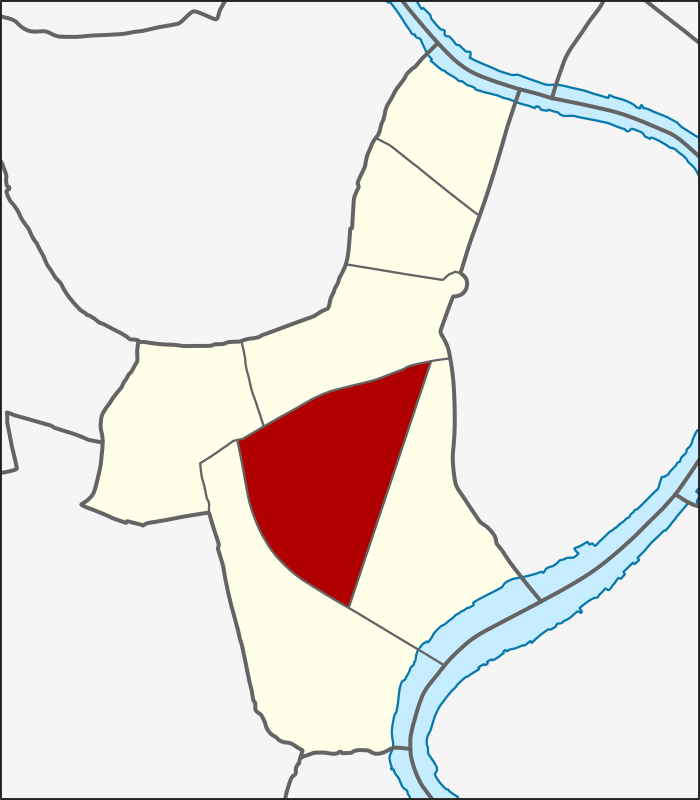
- Location in Thon Buri District
- Country: Thailand
- Province: Bangkok
- Khet: Thon Buri

Area
  - Total: 1.210 km^{2} (0.467 sq mi)

Population (2019)
  - Total: 17,374
  - Density: 14,358.67/km^{2} (37,188.8/sq mi)
- Postal code: 10600
- TIS 1099: 101504

Bukkhalo (Thai: บุคคโล, pronounced [bùk.kʰā.lōː]) is a khwaeng (sub-district) of Thon Buri District, Bangkok. Its name is also the name of surrounding area.

== Toponymy ==
The Thai word "Bukkhalo" does not have an inherent meaning on its own. However, it is believed to have originated from two words in the local Bangkok Malay dialect: "bukat" (บูกัต), meaning whirlpool, and "lolok" (โลโลก), which also means the same. These two words were likely combined into bukatlolok, and over time, the pronunciation gradually shortened to become Bukkhalo.

Therefore, the name "Bukkhalo" carries the underlying meaning of a place with whirlpools, which corresponds to the natural geography of the area, where Wat Bang Nam Chon and Khlong Bang Nam Chon are located.

== Geography ==
Bukkhalo is the central area of the district.

The area is bounded by other subdistricts (from north clockwise): Talat Phlu and Bang Yi Ruea in its district (Ratchaphruek Road is a divider line), Samre in its district (Somdet Phra Chao Tak Sin Road is a divider line), Dao Khanong in its district (Ratchadaphisek Road is a divider line), respectively.

== Places ==
- The Mall Tha Phra
- Wat Krachap Phinit
- Bukkhalo Intersection (touching Samre and Dao Khanong)
- Wat Sutthawas
- Somdet Phra Pin Klao Hospital
- Pho Nimit BTS Station

Note: the local temple Wat Bang Nam Chon, indeed, it is located in the area of neighbouring Samre.
