= The Mall Lifestore Tha Phra =

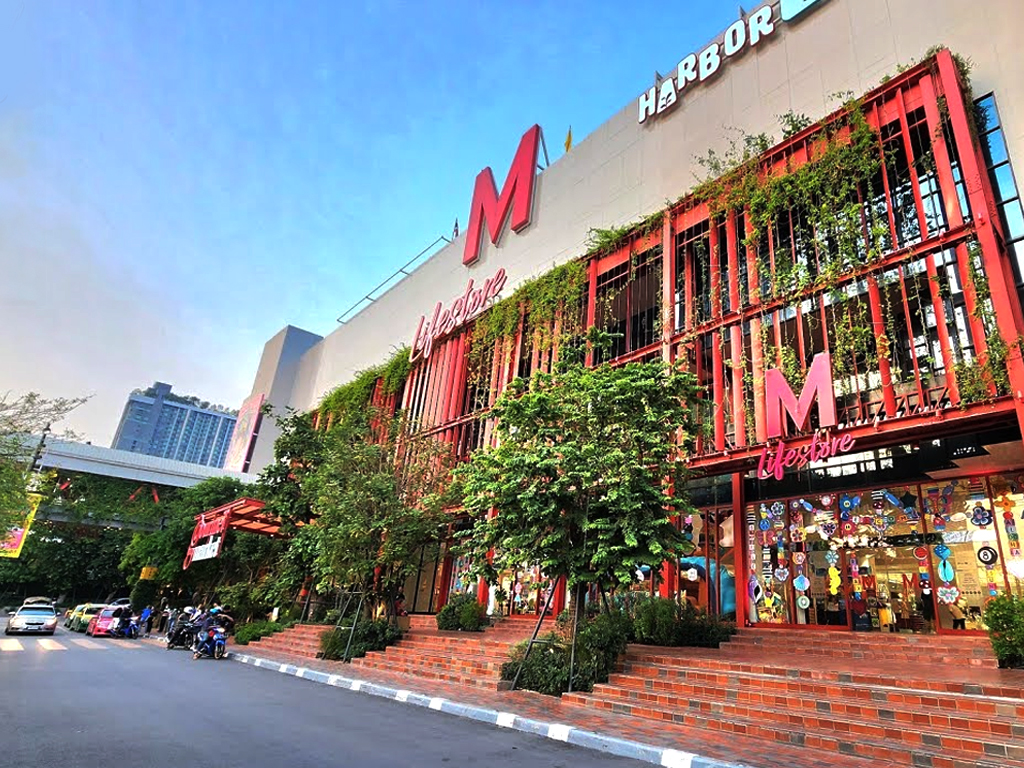
- The Mall Lifestore Tha Phra in 2023.
- Location: Ratchadaphisek Road, Bukkhalo, Thon Buri, Bangkok, Thailand
- Coordinates: 13.713392°N 100.478995°E
- Opened: August 11, 1989
- Developer: The Mall Group
- Manager: The Mall Group
- Owner: The Mall Group
- Floor area: 150,000 m^{2}
- Floors: 6 (B, G, 1-4)
- Website: themalllifestore.com

The Mall Lifestore Tha Phra (Thai: เดอะมอลล์ไลฟ์สโตร์ท่าพระ, previously known as The Mall Tha Phra) is a shopping mall under The Mall Group, located on Ratchadaphisek Road between the Ratchada–Ratchaphruek and Mahaisawan intersections, and not far from Tha Phra Intersection, a major junction on the Thonburi (west bank) side of Bangkok.

== History ==
Opened in 1989 as the first fully integrated department store and shopping mall on the Thonburi side. A major highlight at the time was the rooftop water park under the name "Fantasia Lagoon", which was especially popular among families during weekends and holidays. The mall also featured an erupting volcano show, as well as an ice-skating rink that was popular among teenagers.

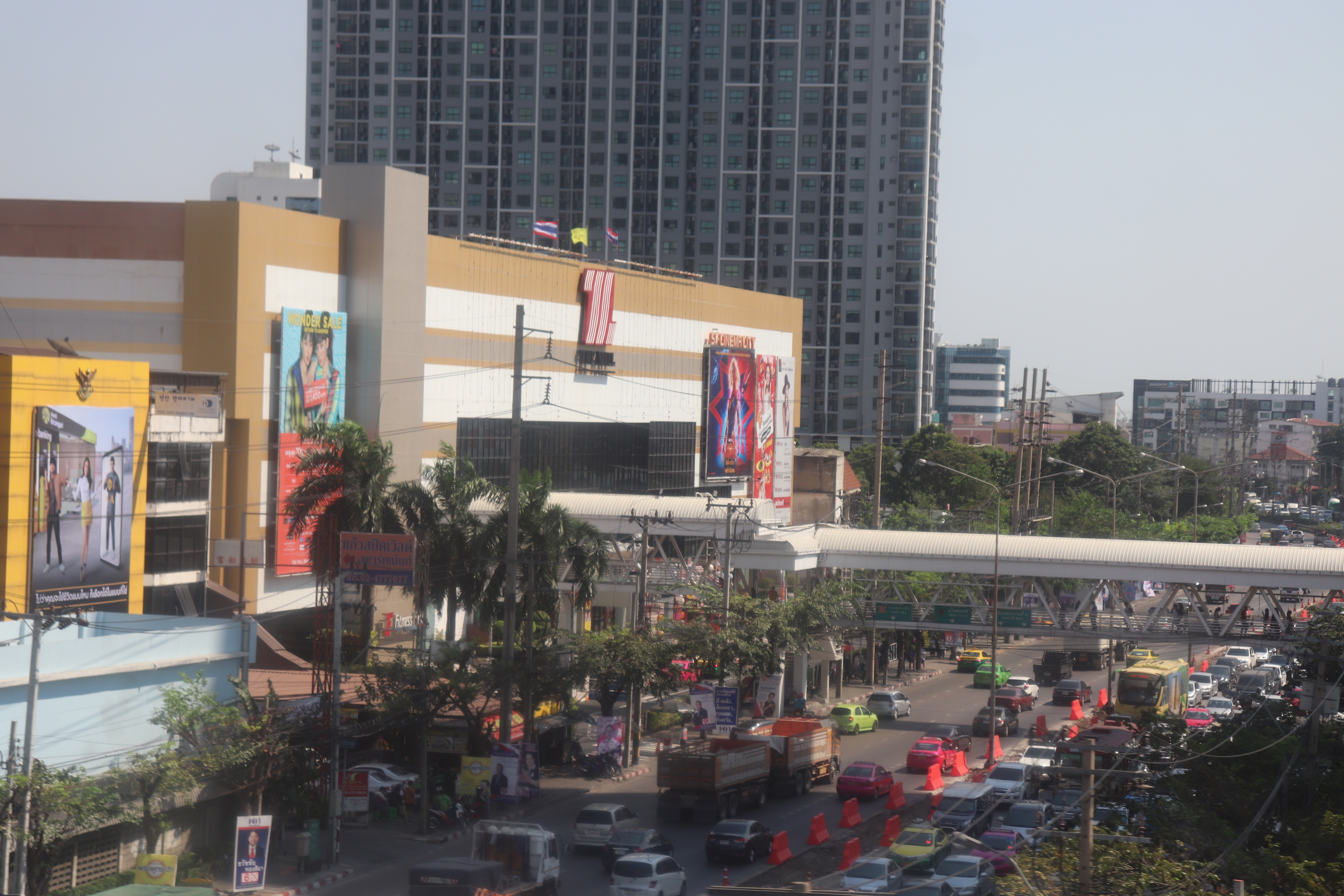
The Mall Lifestore Tha Phra (under the name Tha Mall Tha Phra) in 2009.

From October 1997 to October 2007, the fourth floor was home to NK THX cinemas, a four-screen complex operated by Nakornluang Promotion, owned by Suchart Pisitwutthinan. A key highlight was that all theaters were equipped with THX sound systems, along with notably cool air conditioning. The cinema's design resembled a spaceship set in the middle of a tropical jungle. On its opening day, it premiered two films, Spawn and Air Force One.

Over time, the mall gradually fell into decline. In 2020, The Mall Group undertook a major renovation under the "The Mall Lifestore" concept to modernize the complex and better meet the needs of contemporary consumers. The Mall Lifestore Tha Phra was the second branch under this concept, following The Mall Ngamwongwan, and was completed and reopened in late 2021.

== Anchors ==
- The Mall Department Store
  - Power Mall
  - Sports Mall
  - Beauty Mall
  - Be Trend
- Gourmet Market
  - Gourmet Eats
- SF Cinema Thapra 8 Cinemas
- Uniqlo
- Fitness First
- Harbor Land

== Transportation ==
The Mall Lifestore Tha Phra can be accessed by various public bus routes operated by the BMTA and private operators, such as routes 4-41 (57), 4-12 (68), 4-25 (147), 3-50 (195), 3-51 (205), and 4-63 (547) as well as by the BTS Skytrain Silom Line via Talat Phlu Station (S10). It is also accessible via the BRT system at Ratchaphruek Station (B12).

== See also ==
- List of shopping malls in Thailand
