= First Presbyterian Church, Samray =

Coordinates: 13°42′19″N 100°29′39″E

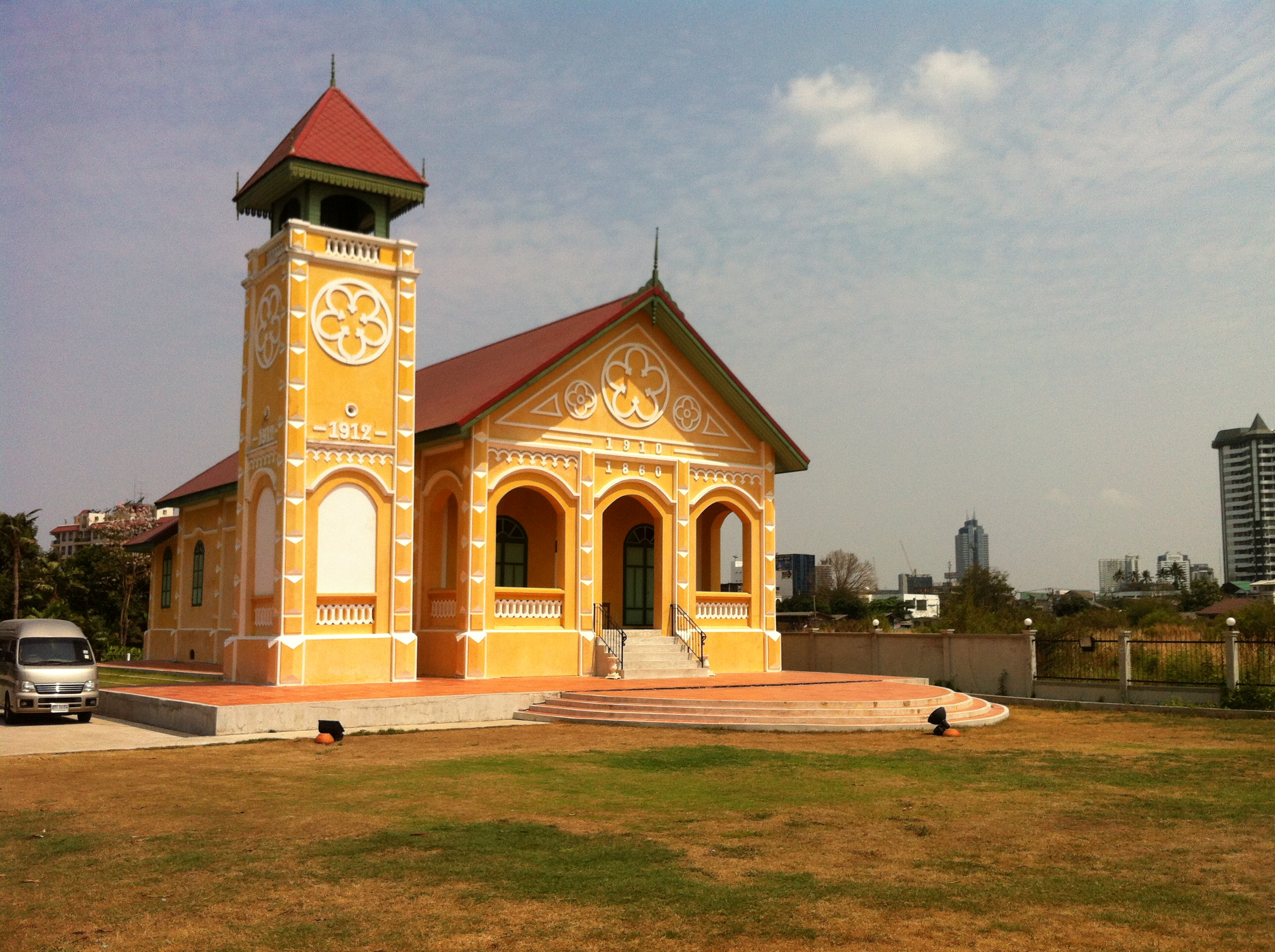
The church in 2014

The First Presbyterian Church, Samray is the oldest Protestant church in the Thai capital Bangkok. Originally founded in 1849, the church was built in its current location on the western bank of the Chao Phraya River in 1857. The present building dates to 1910.

== History ==
The first American Presbyterian missionaries, William P. Buell and his wife, arrived in Bangkok in 1840, but left in 1844 after Mrs Buell became paralysed from illness. The next group of missionaries, Stephen Mattoon and his wife and Samuel Reynolds House, arrived in 1847. They settled near the area of Kudi Chin, where earlier Protestant missionaries, including Dan Beach Bradley, were already living. They were joined in 1849 by Stephen Bush and his wife. The same year, the missionaries met to establish a congregation, naming it the First Presbyterian Church, Bangkok. Without a dedicated church building, they continued to worship in their homes. In 1852, they built a school, which is considered the first formal school in the country and is now Bangkok Christian College.

In 1857, the missionaries relocated to a plot of land in the Samre (or Samray, Thai: สำเหร่) area further down the river (now Samre Subdistrict of Thonburi District). Mattoon had previously acquired the land, then a faraway wilderness, on behalf of David O. King, an American merchant based in Shanghai. King's business subsequently went bankrupt, leaving Mattoon with the land. A church building was built from 1860 to 1862, with donations from foreign merchants, sailors and missionaries, as well as funds from the American government (construction was delayed by the American Civil War).

The original church building was consecrated on 25 May 1862. By the turn of the century, the congregation had outgrown the building, and the church was rebuilt to the original style in 1910. The bell tower was built in 1912. The church has since been in continued use, with periodical restorations.

== Architecture ==
The church is a single-storey structure, built of masonry with load-bearing walls. It has a rectangular floor plan, three column-spans wide and six spans long. The façade, which faces the river to the east, features flower-patterned stucco work on the gable, which is above a portico recessed behind three arches. The simple gable roof is supported by a wooden structure. The building received the ASA Architectural Conservation Award in 2004.
