= Wat Ratchakhrue =

Coordinates: 13°43′20″N 100°28′47″E

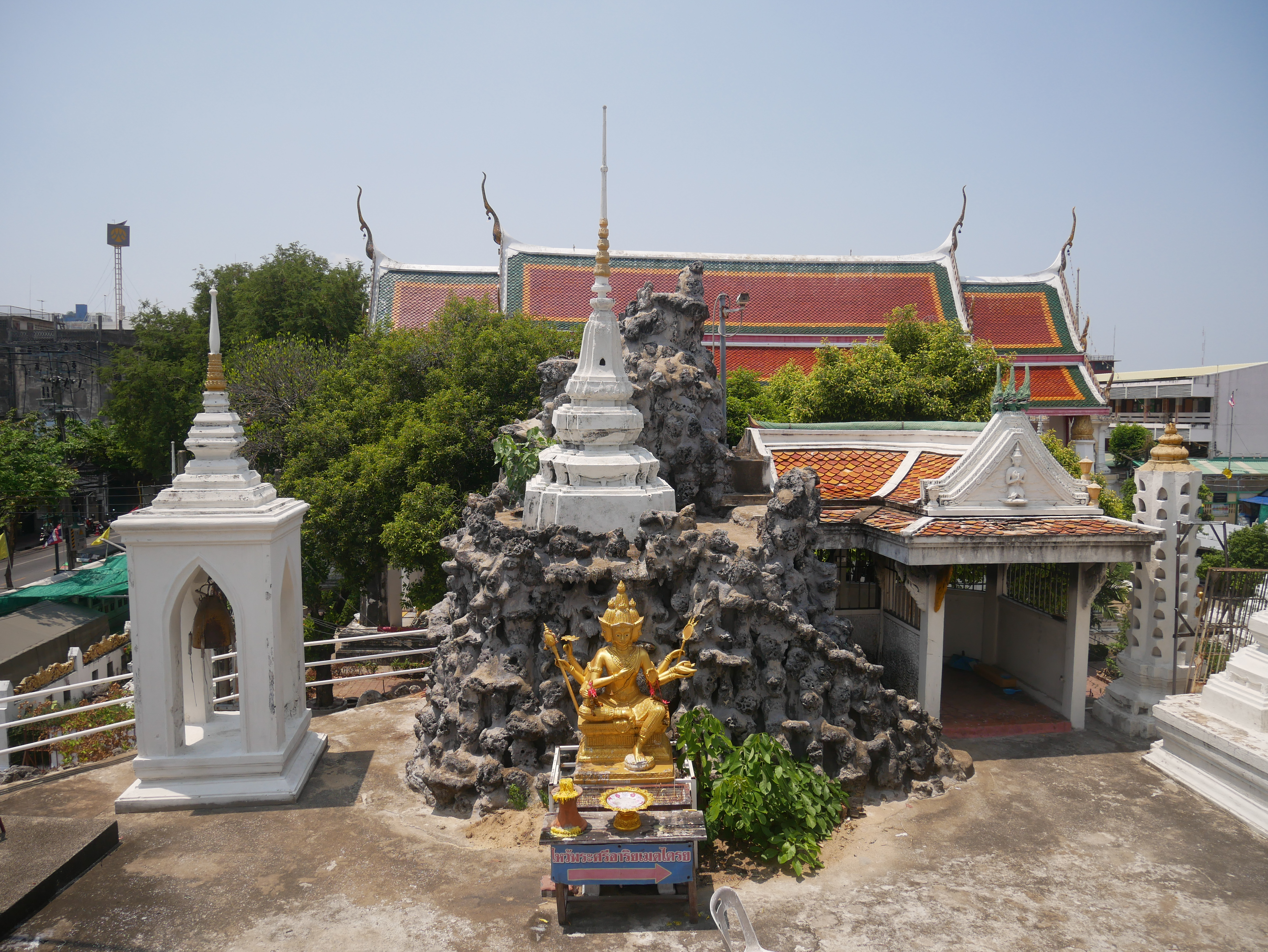
Khao Mo

Wat Ratchakhrue Worawihan (Thai: วัดราชคฤห์วรวิหาร; also written as Wat Rajkrueh) is the third classed royal Buddhist temple of Worawihan type in Bangkok's Thonburi side.

Built before Thonburi kingdom is an ancient monastery which had a former name as Wat Bang Yi Ruea after its location, but the local people usually called the temple Wat Mon from the reason that it was built by a Mon ethnic man and there were many Mon monks lived in the temple.

Later in Thonburi period, King Taksin and Chao Phraya Phrakhlang (Hon) — later became the chancellor of finance during the King Rama I's reign and was the first person to translate the Romance of the Three Kingdoms into Thai, had renovated the monastery and brought the Buddha relics to enshrine in the temple's pagoda. The main hall, now used as Wihara (the sermon hall) is called Bot Phichai Dap Hak as it was built by Phraya Phichai Dap Hak one of King Taksin's most famous and prominent generals. His ashes are also enshrined at this temple. Khao Mo, an artificial mountain based on Buddhist cosmology, is a highlighted construction.

Later, King Rama I then renamed the temple as Wat Rajkrueh. The temple received another restoration and modification during the King Rama III's reign.

Additionally, the canal Khlong Bangkok Yai that runs front the temple is sanctuary to a large school of iridescent sharks, which visitors can feed with bread or fish food. This area is also part of the Talat Wat Klang, a morning market in the Talat Phlu neighbourhood, which was expanded from the adjacent temple, Wat Chantharam Worawihan or known locally as Wat Klang. The location of the Wat Rajkrueh school used to be the location of the Thon Buri district office.
