= Wat Intharam =

Buddhist temple in Bangkok, Thailand

- Wat Bang Yi Ruea Nok, Wat Suan Phlu, Wat Bang Yi Ruea Thai, Wat Tai
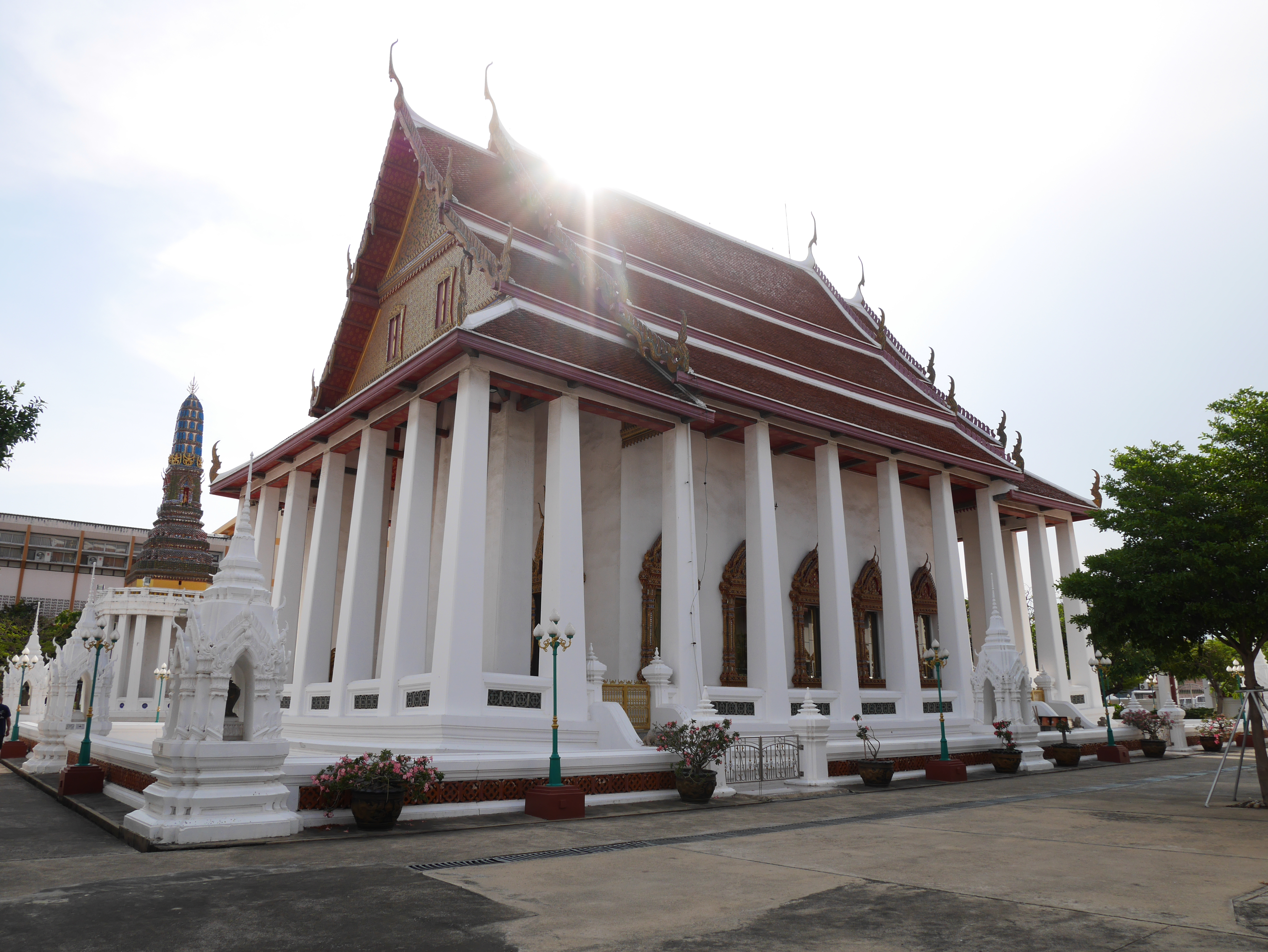
- The ordination hall

- Location within Bangkok

Religion
- Affiliation: Buddhism

Location
- Location: 256 Thoet Thai Rd., Bang Yi Ruea, Thon Buri, Bangkok
- Country: Thailand
- Interactive map of Wat Intharam
- Coordinates: 13.723272°N 100.483418°E

Architecture
- Founder: Unknown

Wat Intharam Worawihan, also commonly known in short as Wat Intharam (Thai: วัดอินทารามวรวิหาร, วัดอินทาราม) is a third-class royal temple in the area of Bang Yi Ruea, Thon Buri District, Bangkok. This temple is recognized as "the temple of King Taksin the Great" (1767–1782).

The temple built during the Ayutthaya era, this monastery with many names were "Wat Bang Yi Ruea Nok" (วัดบางยี่เรือนอก), "Wat Suan Phlu" (วัดสวนพลู), or "Wat Bang Yi Ruea Thai" (วัดบางยี่เรือไทย), etc. But, the most well known locally is Wat Bang Yi Ruea Tai (วัดบางยี่เรือใต้), or simply called Wat Tai (วัดใต้). It was restored by King Taksin, who afterwards granted it the status of a royal temple. It was his favourite temple, where he came to stay overnight to meditate and observe religious precepts.

In 1782, the temple was used to house the royal crematorium of the late King Taksin and his family, inside the temple there are also a pair of stūpa containing the ashes of him and his royal consort. It retained its status as a royal temple throughout the King Rama I's reign (1782–1809), with three high ranking monks governing the monastery. During the King Rama III's reign (1824–1851), a Mon-Persian descent nobleman, Phraya Sisahathep (Thongpheng) restored it once again and asked the King to grant it the status of a royal temple. The request was granted but to a lower status than before. It was named then Wat Intharam in present day.

Wat Intharam is registered a national heritage by the Fine Arts Department since 1949.

== Gallery ==
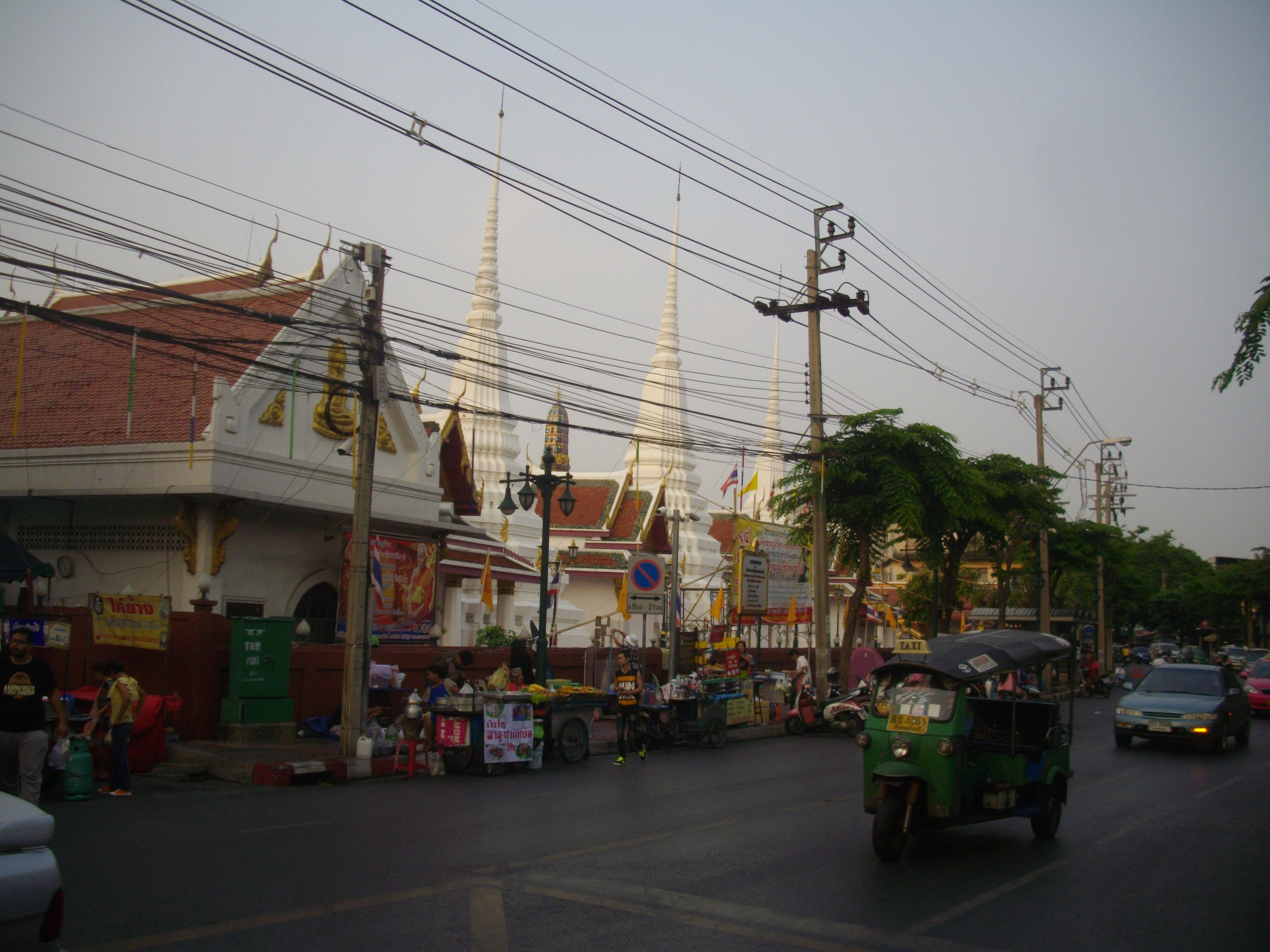
Outside the temple and the passing Thoet Thai Road

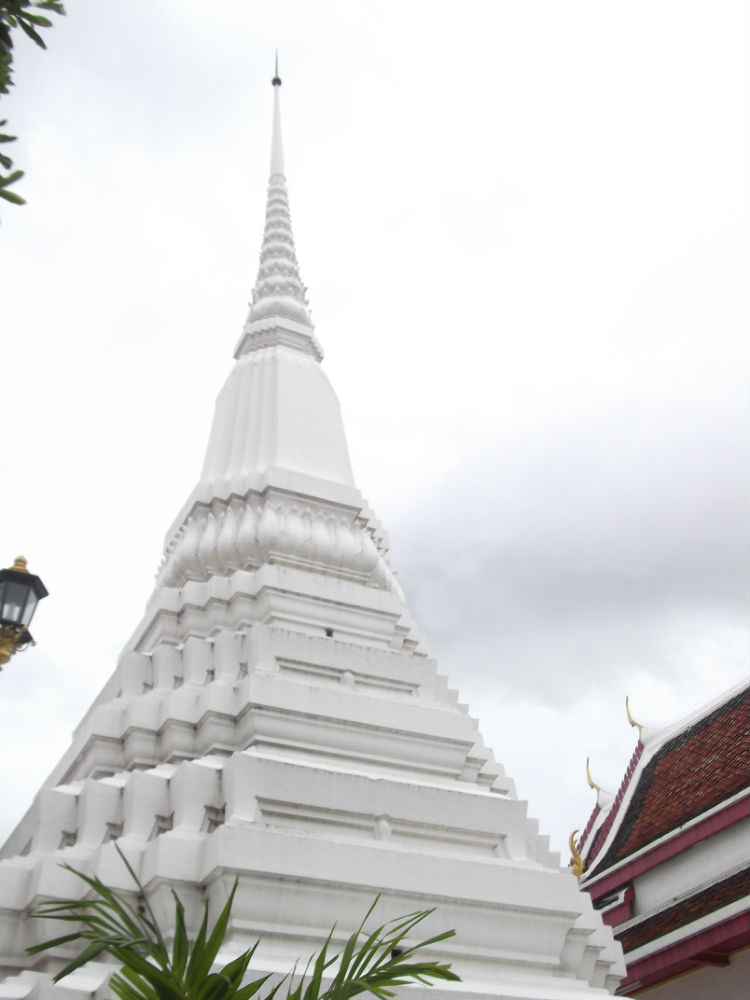
White stūpa

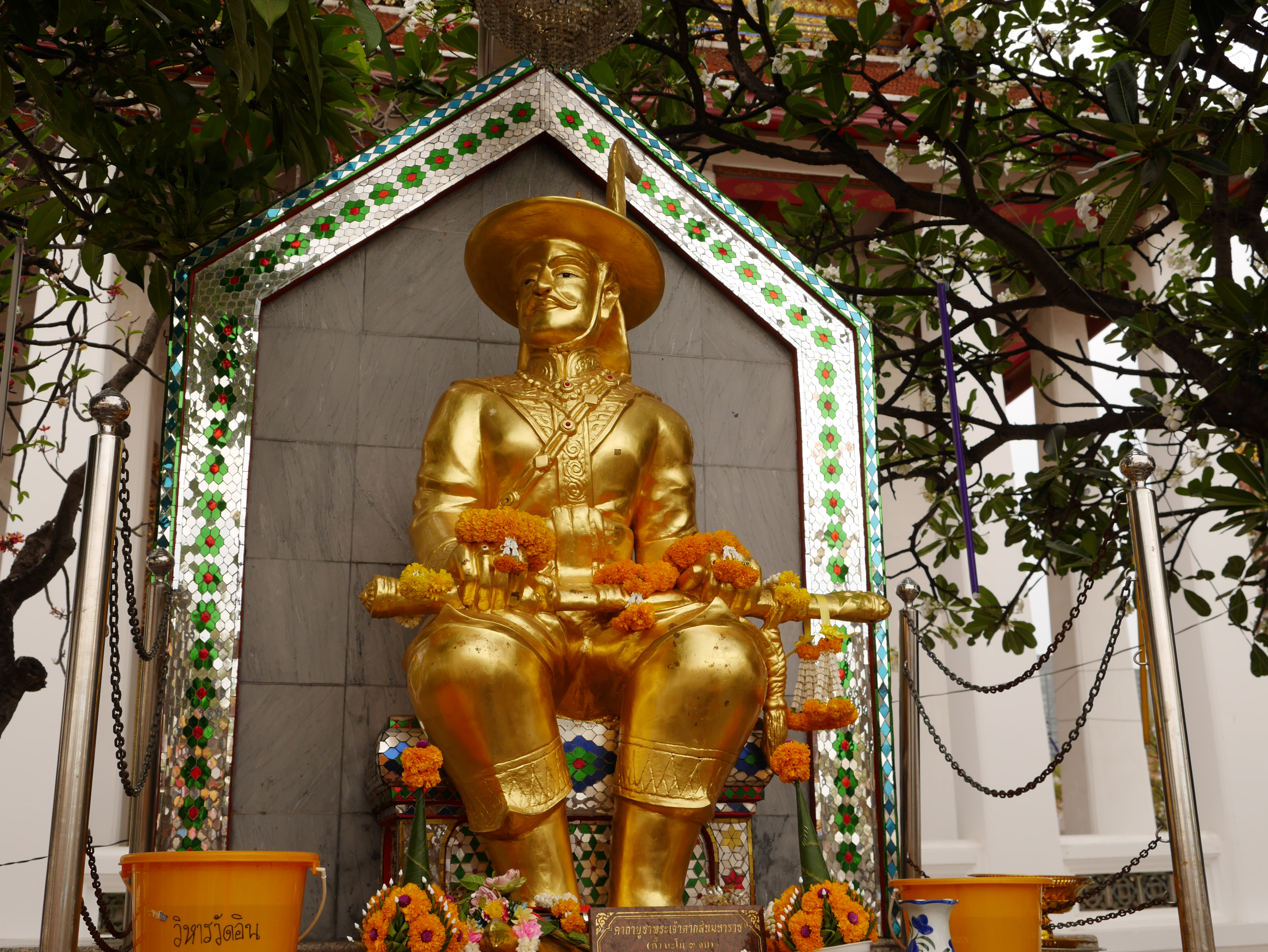
Memorial of King Taksin inside the temple

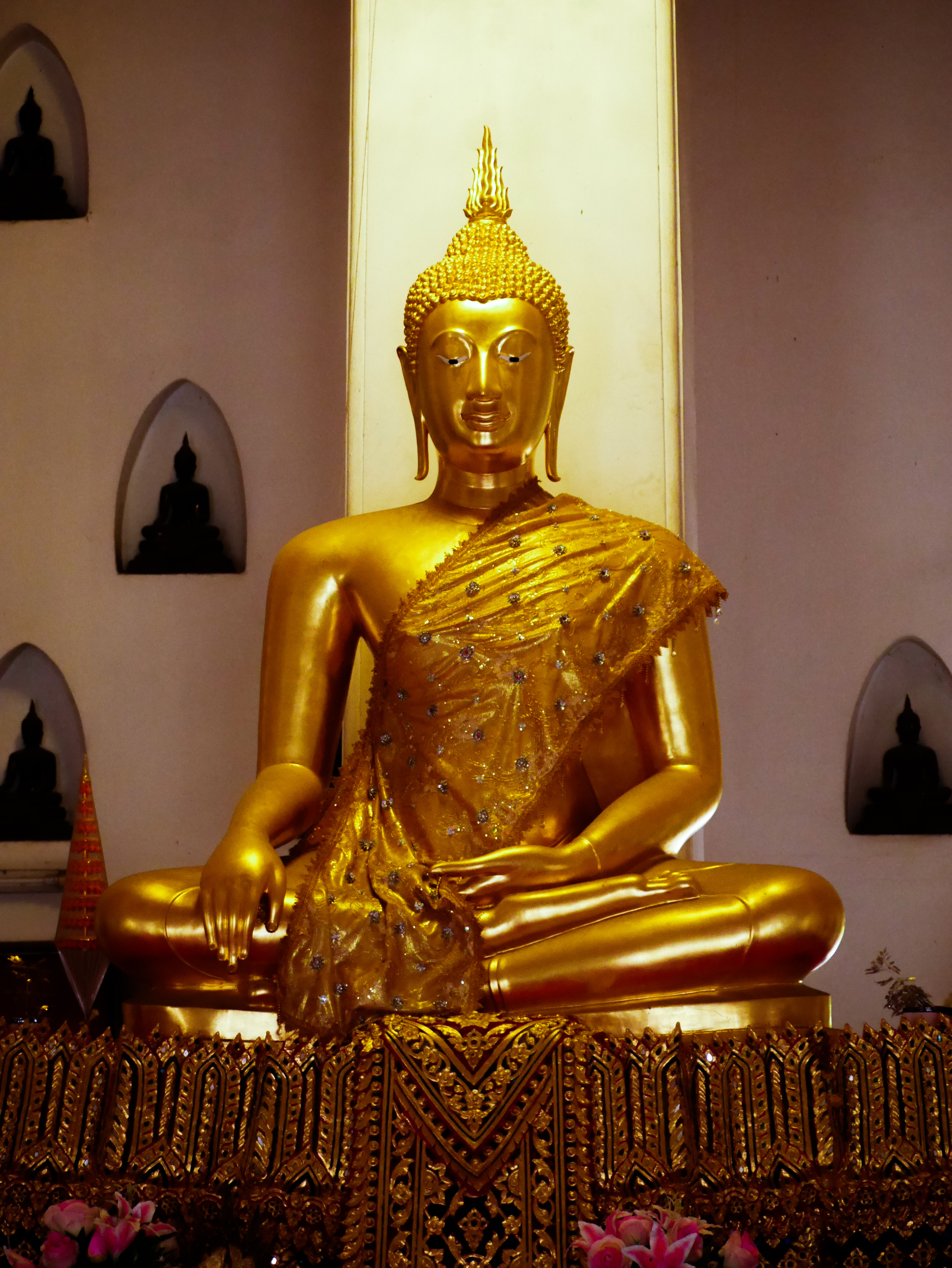
Buddha image

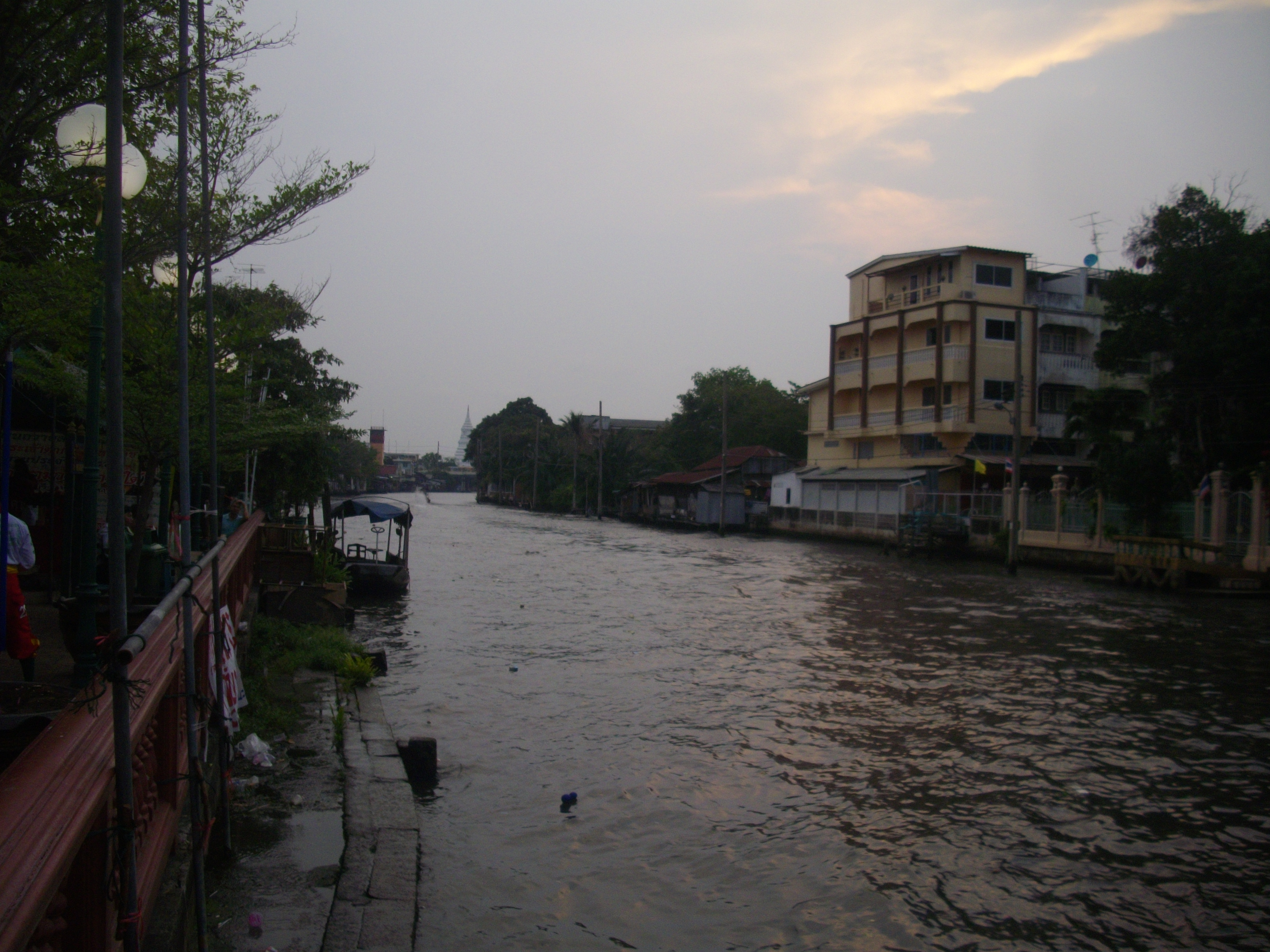
Khlong Bangkok Yai behind the temple

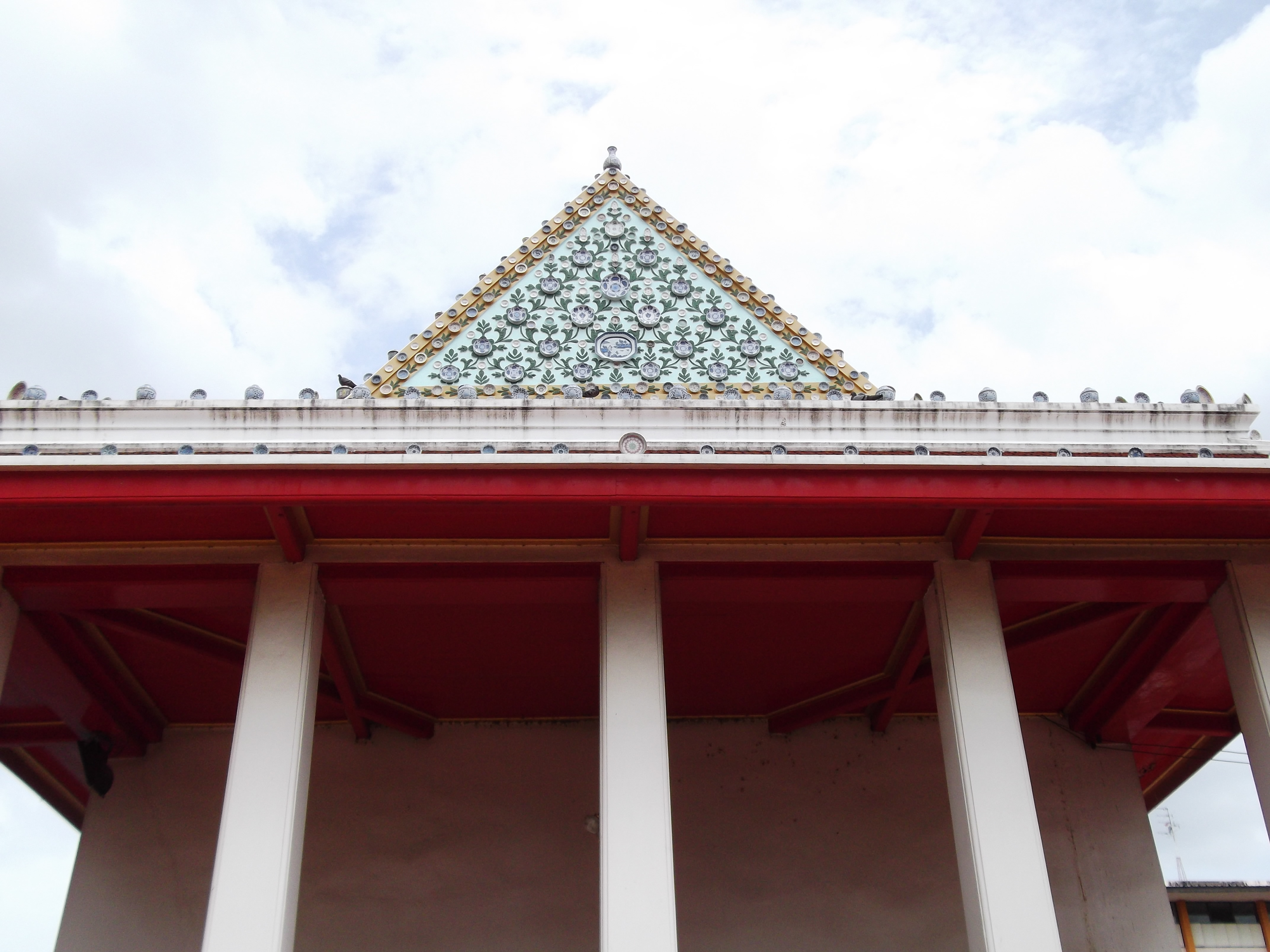
Gable of sanctuary in Chinese-style architecture like Wat Champa and Wat Nang Chi
