= Stephen Mattoon =

American missionary to Siam

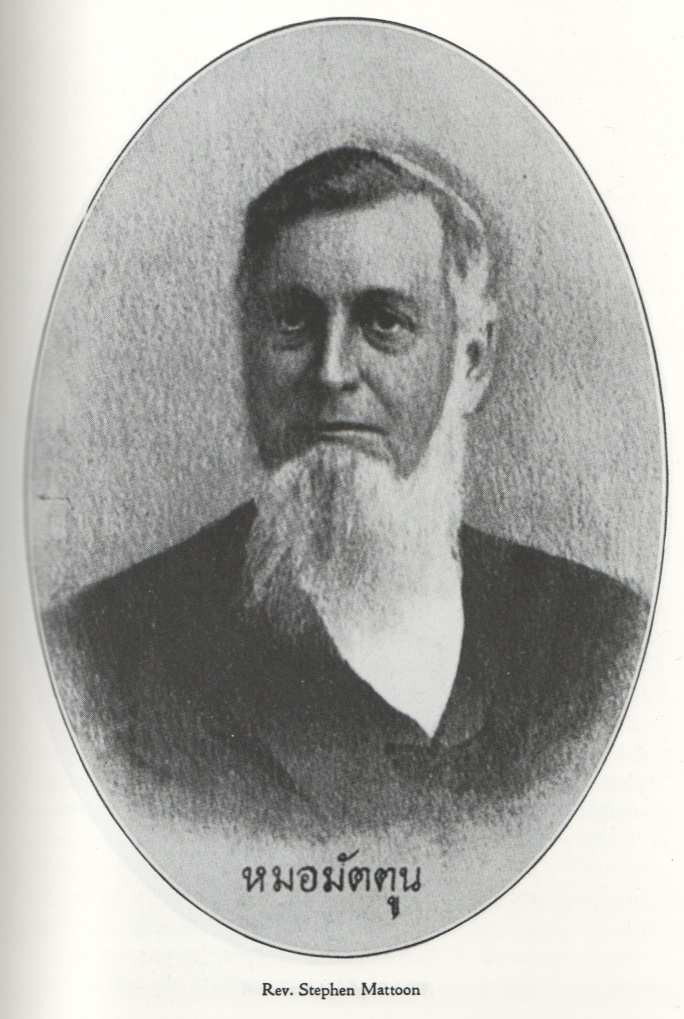
- Missionary to Siam (Thailand)
- Born: May 5, 1816; Champion, New York
- Died: August 15, 1889 (aged 73); United States
- Years active: 1847 – 1885
- Organization: Presbyterian Church (U.S.A.)
- Known for: Missionary to Siam; Translate the New Testament (Siamese language); First U.S.A. Consul to Siam (appoints)
- Spouse(s): Mary Lourie Mattoon, m. 1846
- Children: son George Lourie MATTOON (1850 – 1851); daughter Mary Lourie Mattoon (1854 – ); daughter Emma Williams Mattoon (1857 – 1931)
- Parent(s): Mr. Gershom Mattoon & Mrs. Anna Nancy Sayre Mattoon

Stephen Mattoon (May 5, 1816 – 1889) was an American Presbyterian missionary who worked in Siam from 1847 to 1864. His works include the translation of the New Testament into the Thai language.

== Career ==
Mattoon served as a translator for Townsend Harris in spring 1856. Harris stopped in Siam to update the treaty between the US and Siam. Harris then proceeded to Japan for his appointment as envoy. Mattoon was then appointed as the first consul from the United States in Siam.

After returning to the U.S., Mattoon was appointed in 1870 as the first President of Johnson C. Smith University, which was known as the Biddle Memorial Institute in 1870 and then as Biddle University during his tenure as president, till 1884. Mattoon's grandson Norman Thomas was the Socialist Party candidate for President six times.
