= Thon Buri district =

Thon Buri ธนบุรี
- District
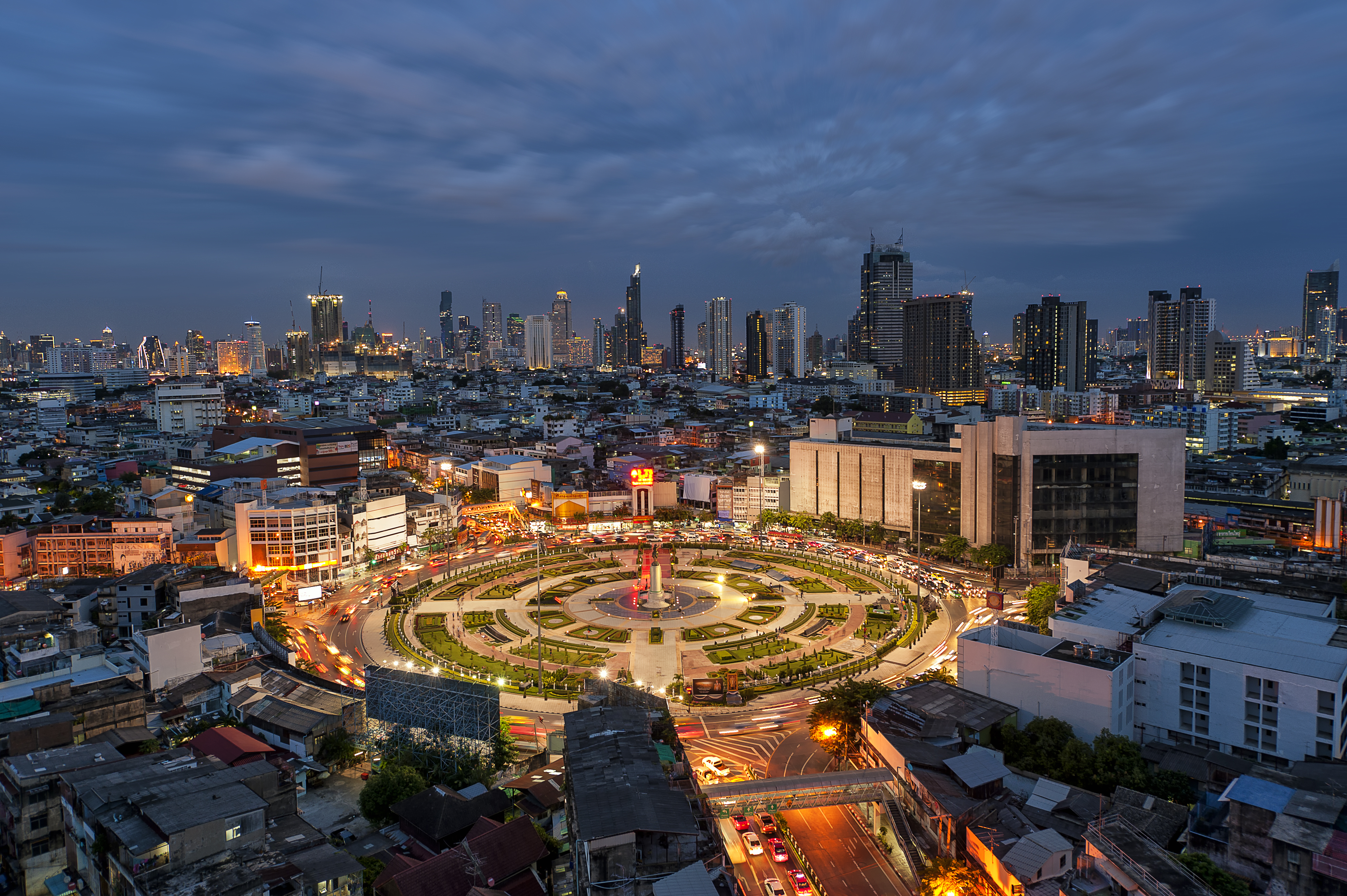
- Wongwian Yai area at night

- District location in Bangkok
- Coordinates: 13°43′30″N 100°29′9″E
- Country: Thailand
- Province: Bangkok
- Seat: Bang Yi Ruea
- Khwaeng: 7

Area
  - Total: 8.551 km^{2} (3.302 sq mi)

Population (2017)
  - Total: 109,482
  - Density: 12,803.41/km^{2} (33,160.7/sq mi)
- Time zone: UTC+7 (ICT)
- Postal code: 10600
- Geocode: 1015

Thon Buri (Thai: ธนบุรี, pronounced [tʰōn būrīː]) is one of the 50 districts (khet) of Bangkok, Thailand. On the west bank of Chao Phraya River, it was once part of Thon Buri province. Neighboring districts are (from north clockwise) Bangkok Yai, Phra Nakhon (across Chao Phraya River), Khlong San, Bang Kho Laem (across Chao Phraya), Rat Burana, Chom Thong, and Phasi Charoen.

== History ==
In addition to the native inhabitants, the district was settled relatively early by foreigners, first Chinese merchants, then the Portuguese after the fall of Ayutthaya to the Burmese in 1767. In addition to the Chinese and Portuguese, there were also Muslims and Mon, from Burma, as well as French priests, particularly in the neighbourhood called Kudi Chin. The area still retains many Chinese shrines, mosques, and Santa Cruz Church, the second Catholic church to be built in Thailand.

The district used to be called Ratchakhrue (ราชคฤห์) due to a nearby wat of the same name. It was renamed Bang Yi Ruea on 11 July 1916 (after the location of the new district office), and finally Thon Buri on 17 April 1939. The district then belonged to Thon Buri province. In December 1971 the province was merged with Bangkok to form the present day Bangkok metropolitan area.

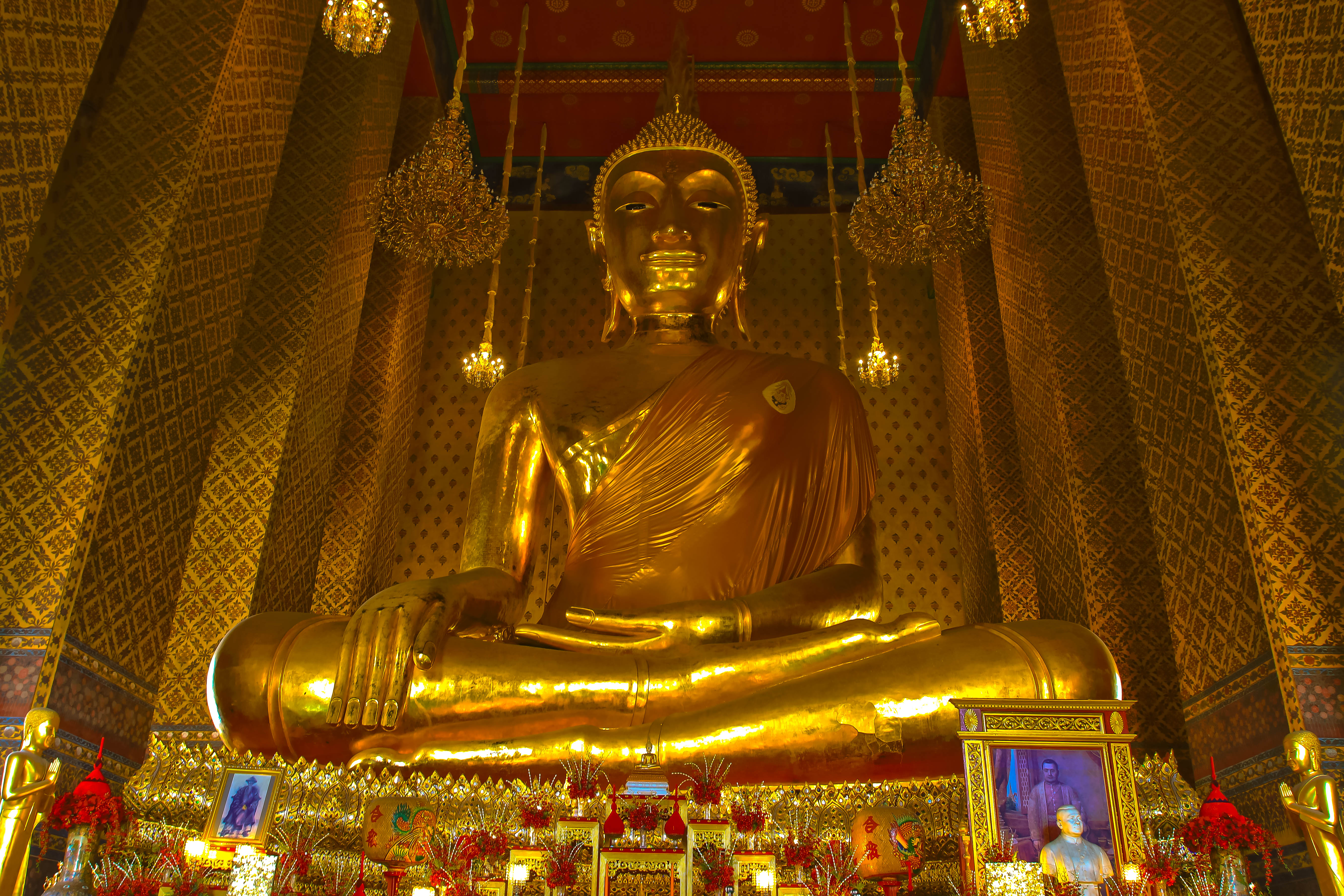
Phra Phuttha Trairattananayok, also familiarly known as Luang Pho To or Samphokong principle Buddha of Wat Kanlayanamit

== Administration ==
The district is divided into seven sub-districts (khwaeng).

No.	Name	Thai	Area (km^{2})	Map
1.	Wat Kanlaya	วัดกัลยาณ์	0.785	Map
2.	Hiran Ruchi	หิรัญรูจี	0.691	Map
3.	Bang Yi Ruea	บางยี่เรือ	1.523	Map
4.	Bukkhalo	บุคคโล	1.210	Map
5.	Talat Phlu	ตลาดพลู	1.823	Map
6.	Dao Khanong	ดาวคะนอง	1.289	Map
7.	Samre	สำเหร่	1.230	Map
Total			8.551	Map

== Places ==
- Taksin Monument and Wongwian Yai (วงเวียนใหญ่) (technically the monument lies on Khlong San side of boundary between Thon Buri and Khlong San Districts)
- Santa Cruz Church
- Wat Kanlayanamit
- Wat Intharam
- Wat Prayurawongsawat
- First Presbyterian Church, Samray

== Transportation ==
- Wongwian Yai is a major bus hub on the west side of the Chao Phraya River.
- The district is served by a few BTS Skytrain stations on Silom Line: Wongwian Yai station (lies near the border between Thon Buri and Khlong San districts), Pho Nimit, Talad Phlu and Wutthakat.

== Health ==
- Somdech Phra Pinklao Hospital, Royal Thai Navy
