= Dao Khanong =

Coordinates: 13°42′17.9″N 100°28′50.3″E

Dao Khanong ดาวคะนอง
- Khwaeng
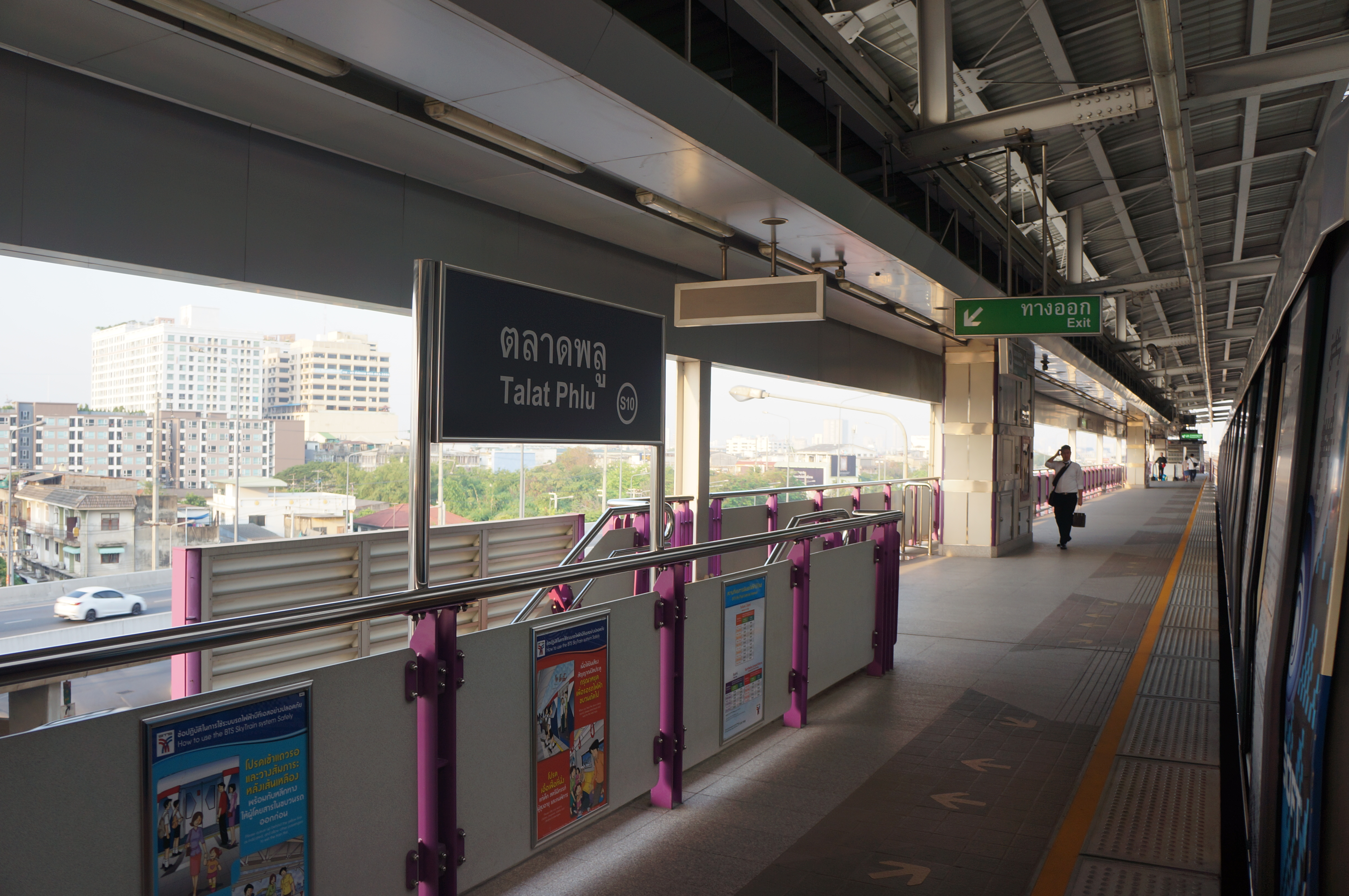
- Talat Phlu BTS station, Dao Khanong.

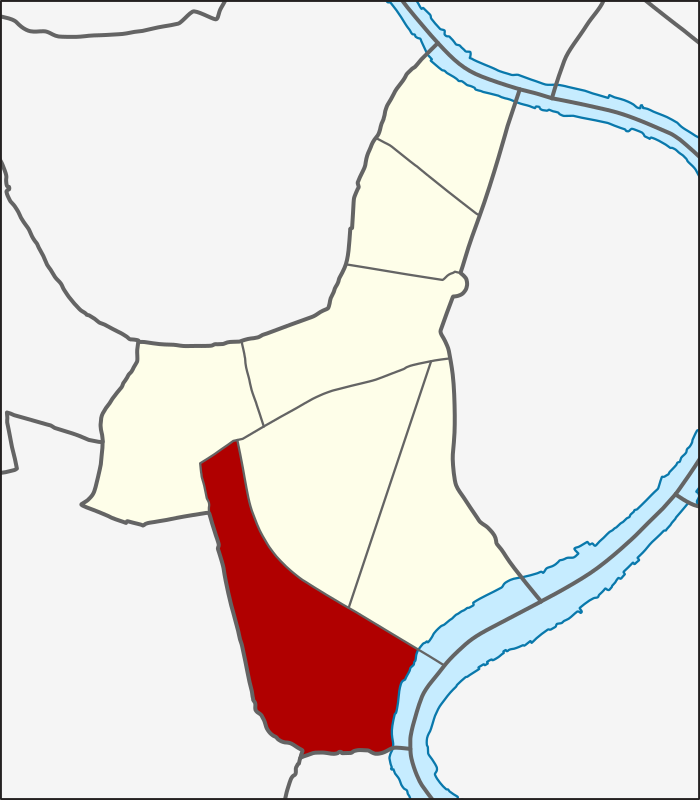
- Location in Thon Buri district
- Country: Thailand
- Province: Bangkok
- Khet: Thon Buri

Area
  - Total: 1.289 km^{2} (0.498 sq mi)

Population (2018)
  - Total: 17,361
  - Density: 13,468.58/km^{2} (34,883.5/sq mi)
- Time zone: UTC+7 (ICT)
- Postal code: 10600
- TIS 1099: 101506

Dao Khanong (Thai: ดาวคะนอง, also spelled: ดาวคนอง; pronounced [dāːw kʰā.nɔ̄ːŋ]) is a khwaeng (sub-district) of Thon Buri district, Bangkok's Thonburi side. It is also the name of the surrounding area.

== History and etymology ==
Dao Khanong roughly translates as 'swaggering star'. It is named after the Khlong (canal) Dao Khanong, which runs through the area and is regarded as the right tributary of Chao Phraya River, which connects the Chao Phraya River with Khlong Bang Khun Thian in the Bang Khun Thian, Chom Thong and Rat Burana areas. Khlong Dao Khanong is regarded as one of the most bustling water transport routes in Bangkok, because it is a tourist route.

There are several theories about the area's name. All believe that it originates from the Mon people and Mon language, because of the numerous Mon population in the area. There are many buildings and neighbourhoods that have Mon roots, such as Wat Nang Nong, or tambon Song Khanong in Phra Pradaeng District, Samut Prakan Province (across the Chao Phraya River).

In addition, there is a legend about two crocodiles fighting in this area, hence the name Dang Khanong ['crocodiles's swagger'], later distorted to Dao Khanong.

Dao Khanong was mentioned in "Nirat Mueang Klaeng" (นิราศเมืองแกลง), the travelogue poetry by the poet Sunthorn Phu in the early- Rattanakosin period.

Around 1970s–1990s, Dao Khanong was an area that was well known as the center for watch and glasses shops of Bangkok.

== Geography ==
Neighbouring sub-districts are (from the north clockwise): Talat Phlu, Bukkhalo, and Samre in its district, Bang Kho Laem of Bang Kho Laem District (across the Chao Phraya River), Chom Thong, and Bang Kho of Chom Thong District.

== Places ==
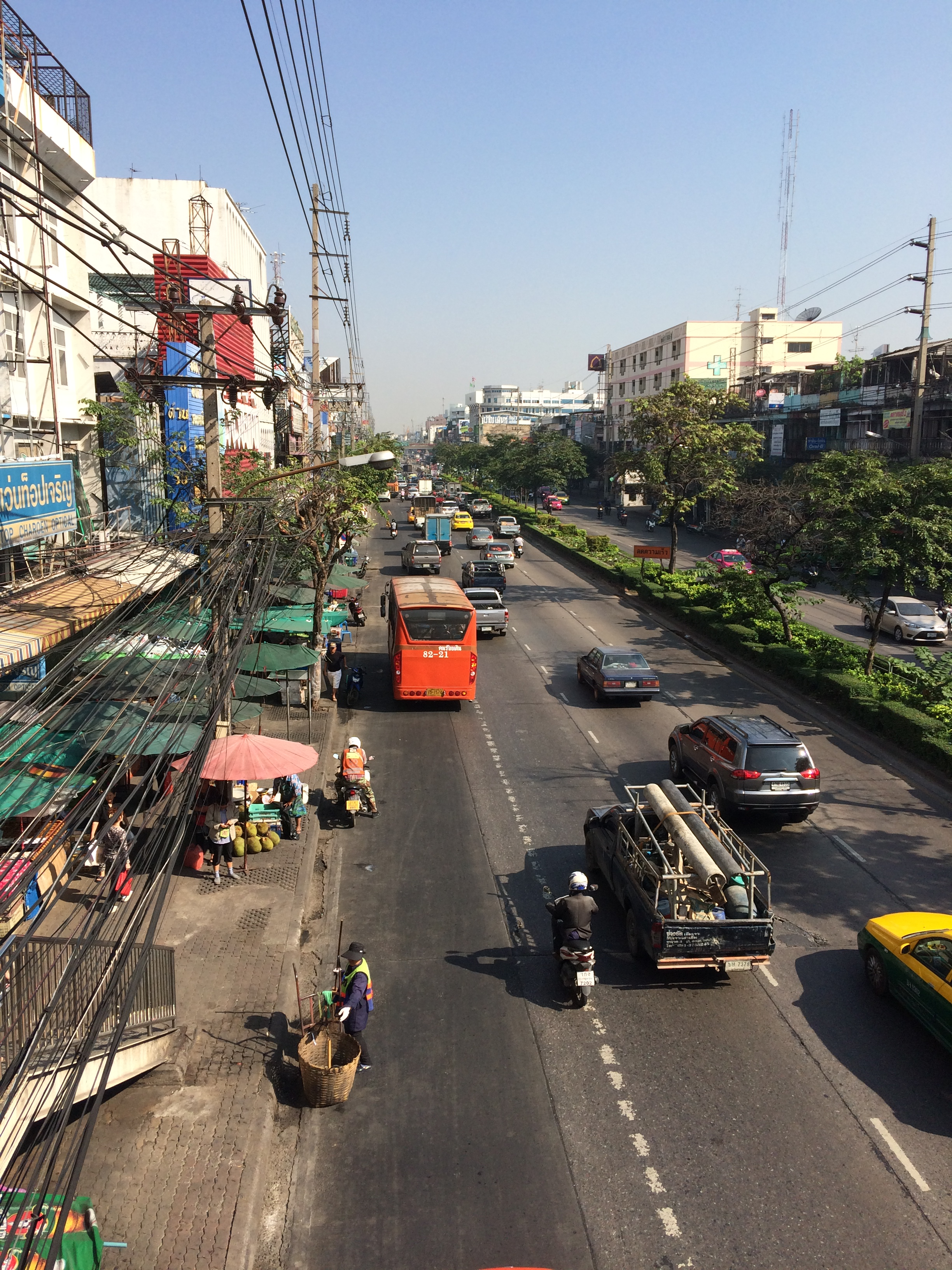
Somdet Phra Chao Tak Sin Road, Dao Khanong Market.

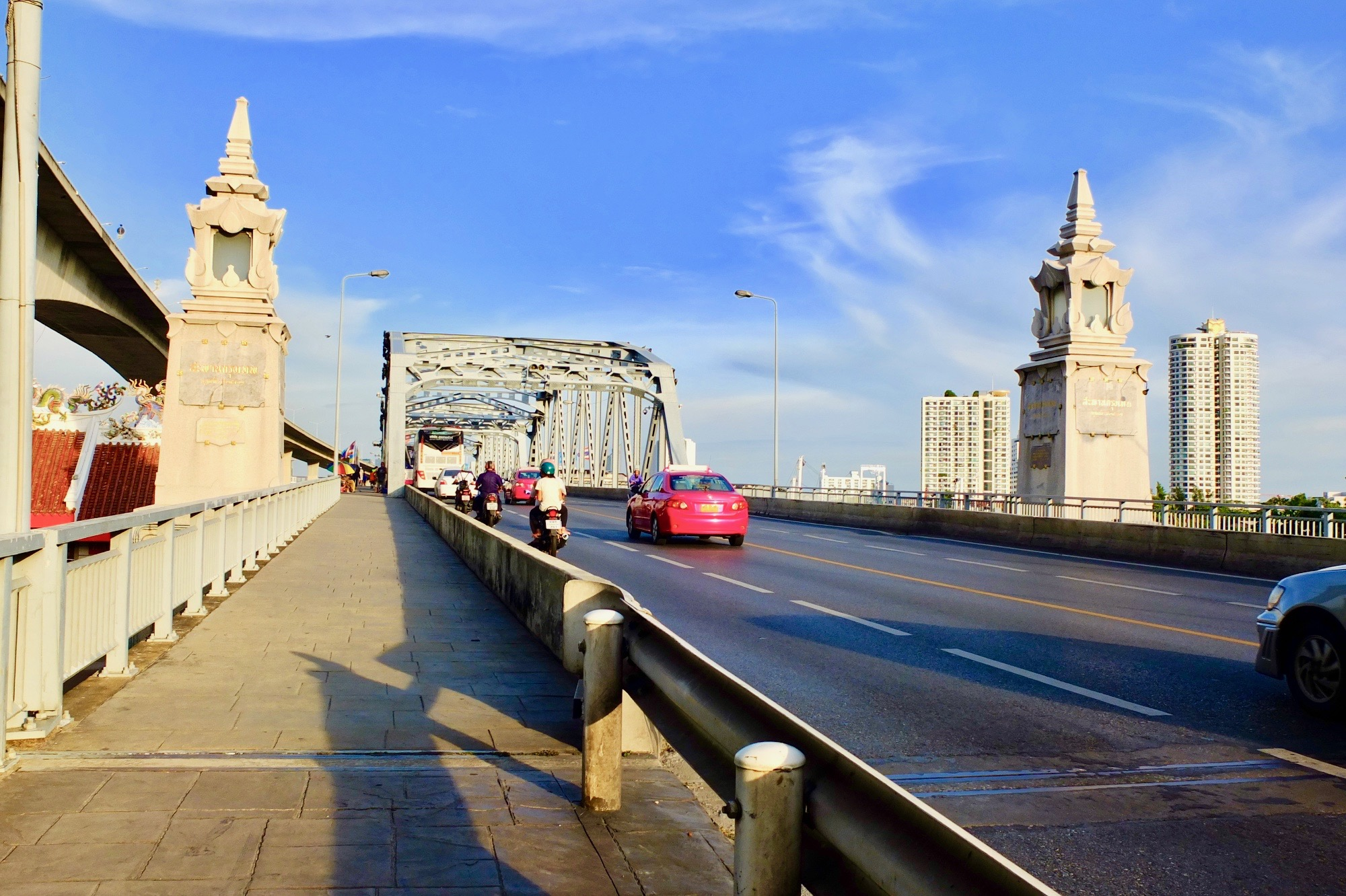
Krung Thep Bridge (seen from Dao Khanong).

- Talat Phlu BTS Station
- Big C Supercenter Dao Khanong
- Yan Nawa office of the Metropolitan Electricity Authority (MEA), Dao Khanong Sub-Branch
- Dao Khanong Market
- Dao Khanong Pier
- Chao Mae Thapthim (Shui Wei Sheng Niang) Shrine
- Lao Pun Tao Kong Shrine
- Buan Chun Tua Almshouse
- Wat Klang Dao Khanong
- Dao Khanong High School

== Transport ==
- Khlong Dao Khanong
- Ratchadapisek Road
- Somdet Phra Chao Tak Sin Road
- Suk Sawat Road
- Charoen Nakhon Road
- Mahaisawan Road and Mahaisawan Intersection
- Bukkhalo Intersection
- Krungthep Bridge (Bangkok Bridge)
- Rama III Bridge (New Bangkok Bridge)
