= Bang Yi Ruea =

Coordinates: 13°43′38.21″N 100°29′13.39″E

Bang Yi Ruea บางยี่เรือ
- Khwaeng
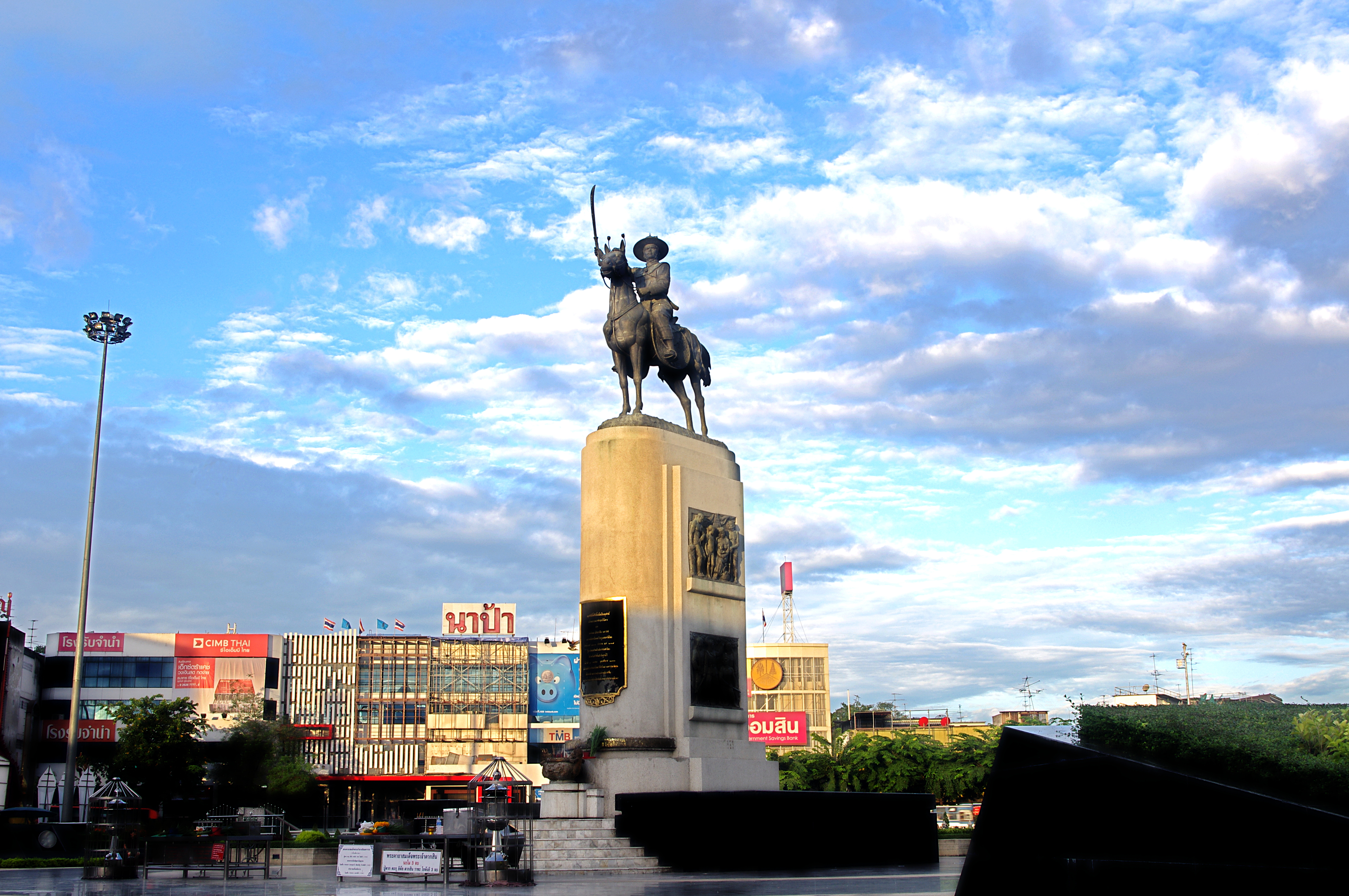
- King Taksin Memorial at Wongwian Yai

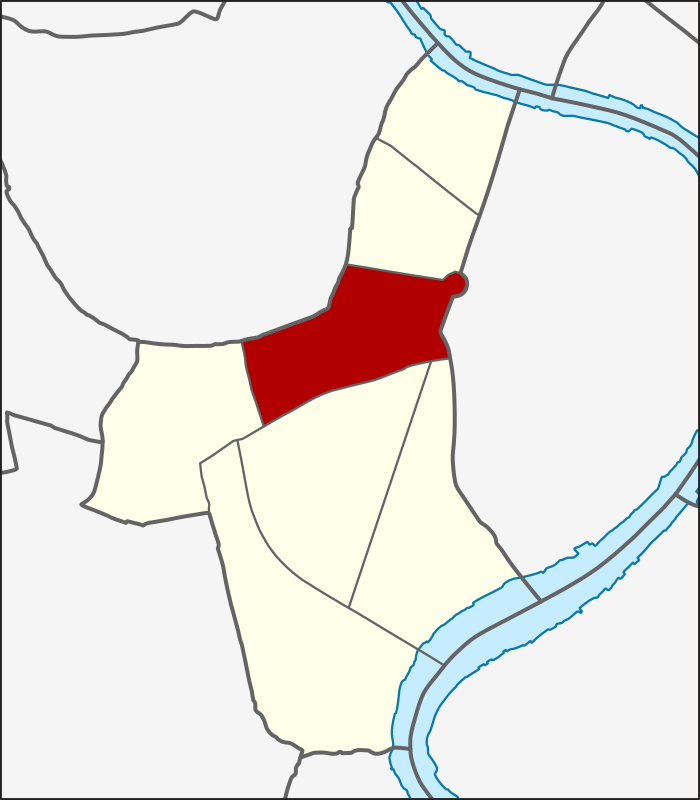
- Location in Thon Buri District
- Country: Thailand
- Province: Bangkok
- Khet: Thon Buri

Area
  - Total: 1.523 km^{2} (0.588 sq mi)

Population (2019)
  - Total: 20,691
  - Density: 13,585.68/km^{2} (35,186.7/sq mi)
- Time zone: UTC+7 (ICT)
- Postal code: 10600
- TIS 1099: 101503

Bang Yi Ruea (Thai: บางยี่เรือ, pronounced [bāːŋ jîː rɯ̄a̯]) is a khwaeng (sub-district) in Thon Buri district, Thonburi side of Bangkok. It has a total area of 1.523 km^{2} (round about 0.588 mi^{2}).

== History ==
Originally, this area was called "Bang Sakae" (บางสะแก), meaning "hamlet of combretums", as it was located along a canal and densely populated with combretum trees. These trees grew thickly enough to serve as natural hiding places. The area was surrounded by three main waterways: Khlong Bang Luang (also known as Khlong Bangkok Yai), Khlong Bang Nam Chon, and Khlong Tha Phra.

During the Thonburi period, in the time of King Taksin, this area was used as a strategic hiding place from which to fire upon Burmese army boats. Because of this, it came to be known as "Bang Ying Ruea" (บังยิงเรือ), literally meaning "place to hide and fire at boats". Over time, through mispronunciation, the name evolved into "Bang Yi Ruea". The area was also home to many Mon people who had fled the wars in Burma.

Later, in the Rattanakosin period, Bang Yi Ruea became a amphoe (district) under Thonburi Province and was named "Amphoe Ratchakhrue" (อำเภอราชคฤห์). In 1916, its name was officially changed to Bang Yi Ruea.

In 1939, the district was renamed again to Amphoe Thon Buri to honour King Taksin. The district underwent several administrative changes over the years until it eventually became a khwaeng (sub-district) under Bangkok’s current system.

== Places ==
- Wongwian Yai & King Taskin Memorial
- Thon Buri District Office
- Bang Yi Ruea Junction
- Bang Yi Reua Metropolitan Police Station
- Naowa Chamnian Bridge–the beginning of Petchkasem road (Highway 4), the longest road in Thailand
- Wat Welurachin
- Wat Rajkrueh (Wat Bang Yi Ruea Nai, Wat Bang Yi Ruea Nuea)
- Wat Chantharam (Wat Klang Talat Phlu) and its traditional market
- Wat Intharam (Wat Tai, Wat Bang Yi Ruea Tai)
- Masjid Suan Phlu
