= Ratchadaphisek Road =

Road in Bangkok, Thailand

Coordinates: 13.7922°N 100.5989°E

Ratchadaphisek Road ถนนรัชดาภิเษก (Thai)
- Bangkok Inner Ring Road ถนนวงแหวนรอบในกรุงเทพมหานคร (Thai)
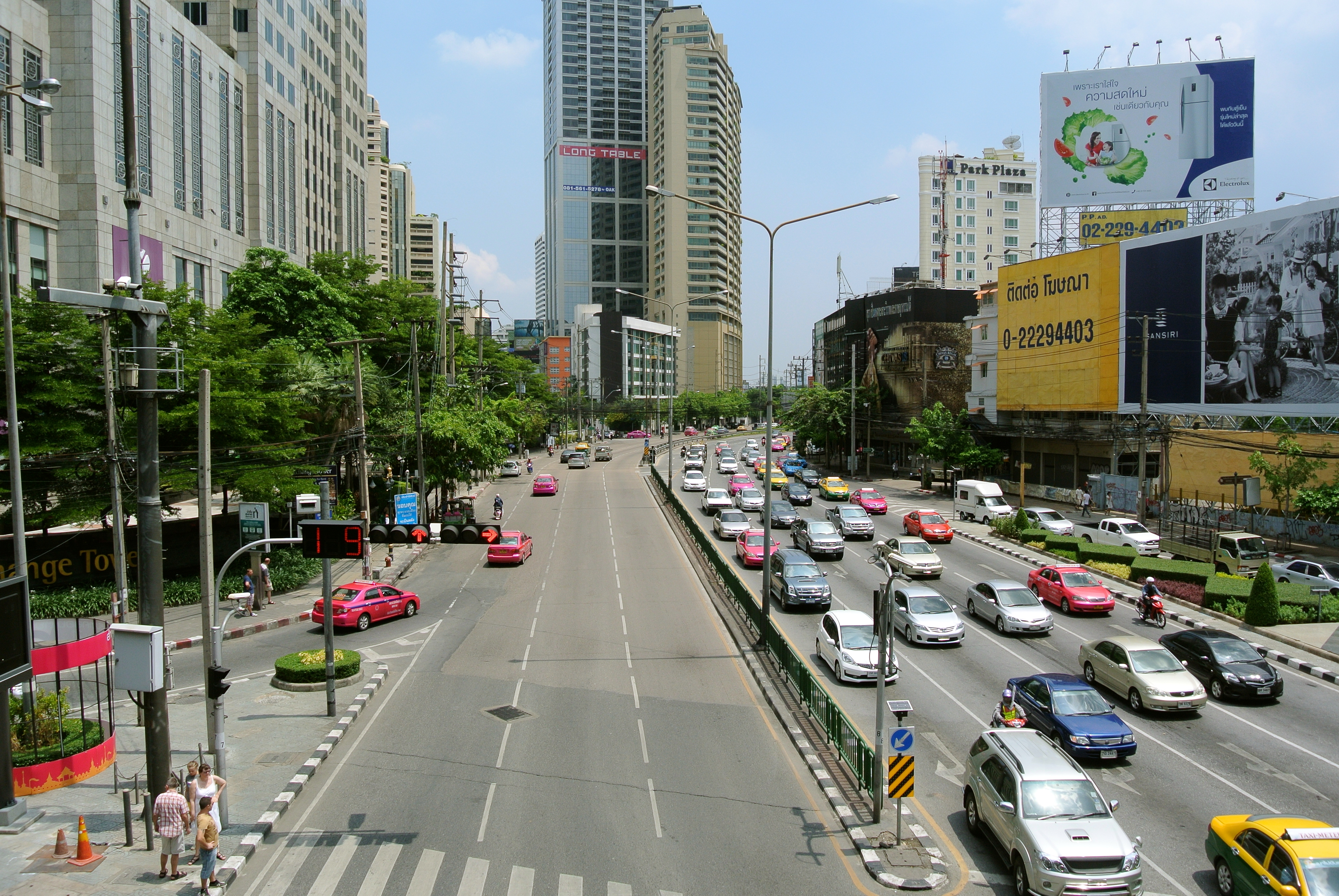
- Ratchadaphisek Road at Asok junction with Sukhumvit Road, seen towards south.

Route information
- Length: 45 km (28 mi)
- Existed: 1976–present

Major junctions
- Orbital around inner Bangkok

Ratchadaphisek Road (Thai: ถนนรัชดาภิเษก, RTGS: Thanon Ratchadaphisek), also known as Bangkok Inner Ring Road (Thai: ถนนวงแหวนรอบในกรุงเทพมหานคร) is a major road in Bangkok, Thailand. Conceived in 1971 and opened in 1976, it connects earlier portions including Asok Montri, Wong Sawang and Charan Sanitwong Roads to form the city's inner ring road system. The road's name comes from the silver jubilee of the reign of King Bhumibol Adulyadej.

Ratchadaphisek Road crosses major traffic arteries such as Sukhumvit, Phahon Yothin, Vibhavadi Rangsit, Lat Phrao, Phet Kasem, Rama IV Road and the Si Rat Expressway. Areas around the road are served by numerous rapid transit stations; Ratchayothin BTS station and Asok BTS station of Sukhumvit Line, Talat Phlu BTS station of Silom Line, Wong Sawang MRT station of MRT Purple Line, as well as two long segments of the MRT Blue line (elevated section in Thonburi between Tha Phra MRT station and Bang O MRT station, and an underground section between Lat Phrao MRT station and Queen Sirikit National Convention Centre MRT station).

== Ratchadaphisek entertainment district ==
The Ratchadaphisek district stretches from the junction with Rama IX Road to the one with Sutthisan Winitchai Road. It is a well-known entertainment area, including shopping complexes such as The Esplanade, cinema complexes such as Major Cineplex, a night bazaar, and night markets as well as love hotels.

Along with Royal City Avenue (RCA) and Patpong, portions of the district are designated as "entertainment zones" and thus allowed to remain open until 02:00.

Previously, in the 1980s, the same area was home to several large Thai restaurants in the form of garden restaurants. They were usually traditional Thai wooden houses with waiters wearing distinctive Thai costumes. The largest one was "Tamnak Thai" (ตำหนักไท, "Thai palace"). The restaurant was divided into four Thai houses, serving food from all four regions of Thailand. The waiters wore traditional attire but skated around to provide speedy service. At night, a light and sound show featuring classical Thai dance was performed on a central stage set over a pond, leaving an impression on guests.

The restaurant eventually closed, and its owner reopened it under the name Royal Dragon Restaurant on Bang Na–Trat Road in the early 1990s, following a similar concept, which Guinness Book of World Records has recorded as the world's largest restaurant.

== Rapid transit ==
- The MRT Blue line runs on Ratchadaphisek Road in two long segments; an elevated section in Thonburi between Tha Phra and Bang O stations, and an underground section between Lat Phrao and Queen Sirikit National Convention Centre stations:
  - Tha Phra
  - Charan 13
  - Fai Chai
  - Bang Khun Non
  - Bang Yi Khan
  - Sirindhorn
  - Bang Phlat
  - Bang O
  - Lat Phrao
  - Ratchadaphisek
  - Sutthisan
  - Huai Khwang
  - Thailand Cultural Centre
  - Phra Ram 9
  - Phetchaburi
  - Sukhumvit
  - Queen Sirikit National Convention Centre
- Wong Sawang MRT Station of MRT Purple Line is located above Wong Sawang Intersection.
- Ratchayothin BTS station and Asok BTS station of Sukhumvit Line is located above Ratchayothin intersection.
- Talat Phlu BTS station of Silom Line is located above Ratchadaphisek-Ratchaphruek intersection.

== See also ==
- Ratchadaphisek MRT station
- Suan Lum Night Bazaar Ratchadaphisek
- The Esplanade (Bangkok)
- Bangkok/Ratchadaphisek travel guide from Wikivoyage
