= Blue Line (Bangkok) =

Rapid transit line in Thailand

MRT Blue Line

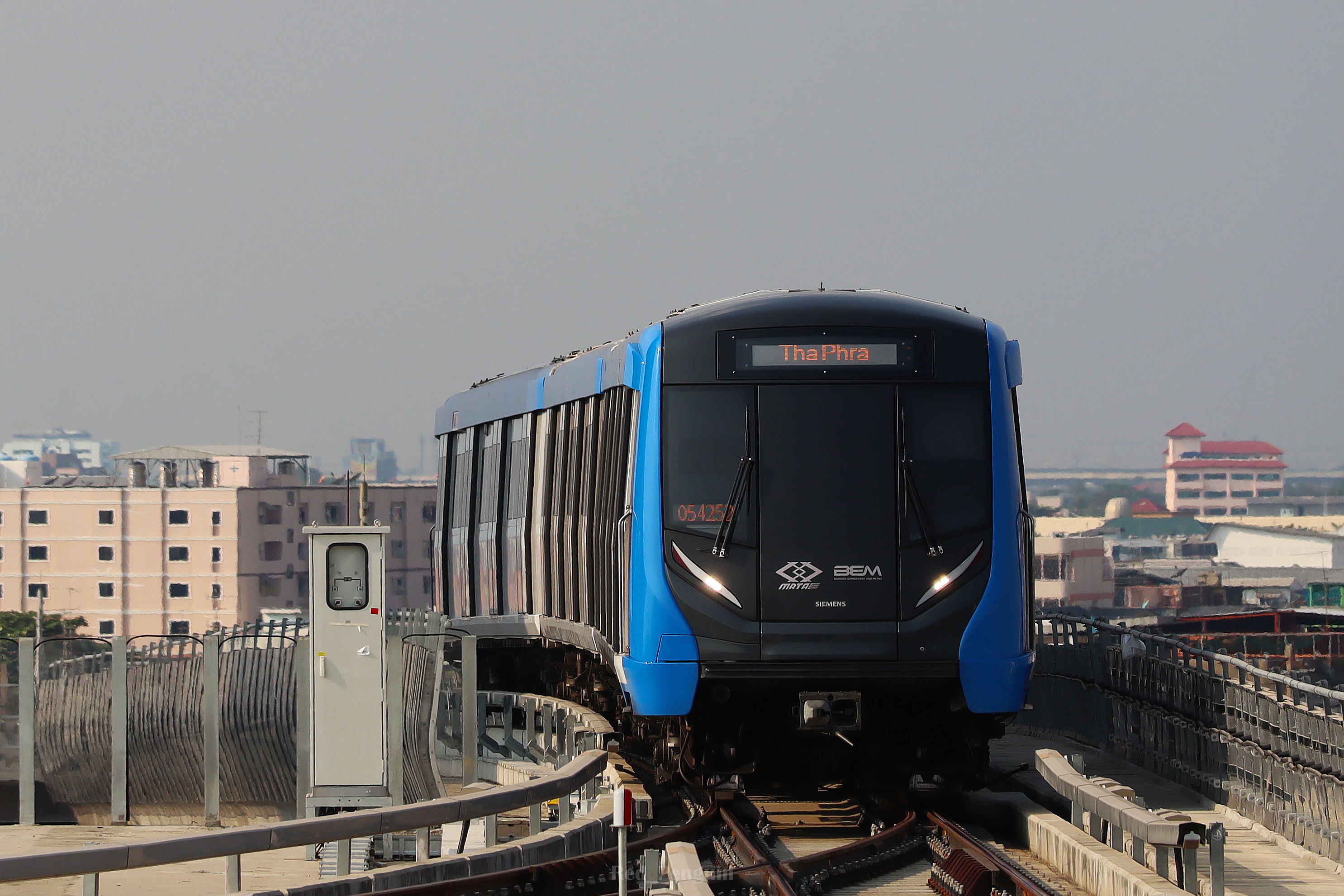
- EMU-BLE approaching Tha Phra station upper-level platform

Overview
- Other name(s): Subway (for the original route during its early years); MRT Chaloem Ratchamongkhon Line
- Native name: รถไฟใต้ดิน สายสีน้ำเงิน สายเฉลิมรัชมงคล
- Owner: Mass Rapid Transit Authority
- Locale: Bangkok
- Termini: BL01 Tha Phra; BL38 Lak Song (via BL19 Thailand Cultural Centre)
- Stations: Total : 42 stations 38 (operational); 4 (future)
- Color on map: Blue

Service
- Type: Rapid transit
- System: MRT
- Operator: Bangkok Expressway and Metro
- Depot(s): Phra Ram 9 Depot; Phetkasem Depot
- Rolling stock: Siemens Modular Metro; EMU-IBL: 19 three-car trains Siemens; EMU-BLE: 35 three-car trains Future Siemens Rolling Stocks; 21 three-car trains
- Daily ridership: 424,398 (2024)

History
- Work began: 2 December 1996; 29 years ago
- Opened: 3 July 2004; 22 years ago
- Last extension: 23 December 2019; 6 years ago

Technical
- Line length: Total: 55.63 km (34.57 mi); 46.91 km (29.15 mi) (operational); 8.72 km (5.42 mi) (future)
- Character: Elevated: 29.5 km (18.3 mi); Underground: 26.13 km (16.24 mi)
- Track gauge: 1,435 mm (4 ft 8 1/2 in) standard gauge
- Electrification: 750 V DC third rail
- Operating speed: 80 km/h (50 mph)
- Signalling: Siemens Trainguard LZB700M fixed block ATC under ATO GoA 2 (STO)

The MRT Blue Line (Thai: รถไฟฟ้ามหานคร สายสีน้ำเงิน) or MRT Chaloem Ratchamongkon Line (Thai: รถไฟฟ้ามหานคร สายเฉลิมรัชมงคล) is Bangkok's third rapid transit line, following Sukhumvit Line and Silom Line of the BTS Skytrain. It is the first line of the MRT system and is operated by Bangkok Expressway and Metro (BEM). The line has a total length of 48 km (29.83 mi), operating as a semi-circle or spiral route from Lak Song to Tha Phra which also serves as a self-interchange station.

The first stage of the MRT Blue Line, a 20 km (12.43 mi) semi-circle alignment from Hua Lamphong to Bang Sue opened on 3 July 2004, which was then followed by a 1.2 km (0.75 mi) extension to Tao Poon opened on 11 August 2017. The line was extended to the west from Hua Lamphong through new stations in the Chinatown and Rattanakosin Island on 29 September 2019. Finally, the line was extended south from Tao Poon to Tha Phra through new stations in Thonburi on 30 March 2020, completing the semi-circle line. Another 7.8 km (4.8 mi), 4 station extension from Lak Song to Phutthamonthon Sai 4 is planned but remains unbuilt.

The MRT Blue line connects major business, residential and cultural areas of Bangkok. In late 2019, the average daily ridership was 400,000. During the third wave of COVID-19 in Bangkok, ridership fell to between 76,000 - 116,000 per weekday during the year 2021.

== Route alignment ==
The MRT Blue Line begins from the upper platform of Tha Phra station. It runs on an elevated viaduct northward along Charan Sanit Wong Road to Bang O station before crossing the Chao Phraya River, entering Bang Pho station and Tao Poon station in Bang Sue District. The line then dives underground to reach Bang Sue. It follows the Kamphaeng Phet, Phahon Yothin and Lat Phrao Roads, then turns south following Ratchadaphisek Road to Queen Sirikit National Convention Centre station. It then turns west following Rama IV Road. It passes Hua Lamphong station in Pathum Wan District, through Chinatown, then under the Chao Phraya River before ascending onto an elevated viaduct to the lower platform of Tha Phra station. The line continues west along Phet Kasem Road to Lak Song station in Bang Khae, situated near Kanchanaphisek Road or Western Outer Ring road. It forms a quasi circle loop around Bangkok.

== History ==
Fare gates in a Blue Line station

Ticket Vending Machine at Si Lom MRT station

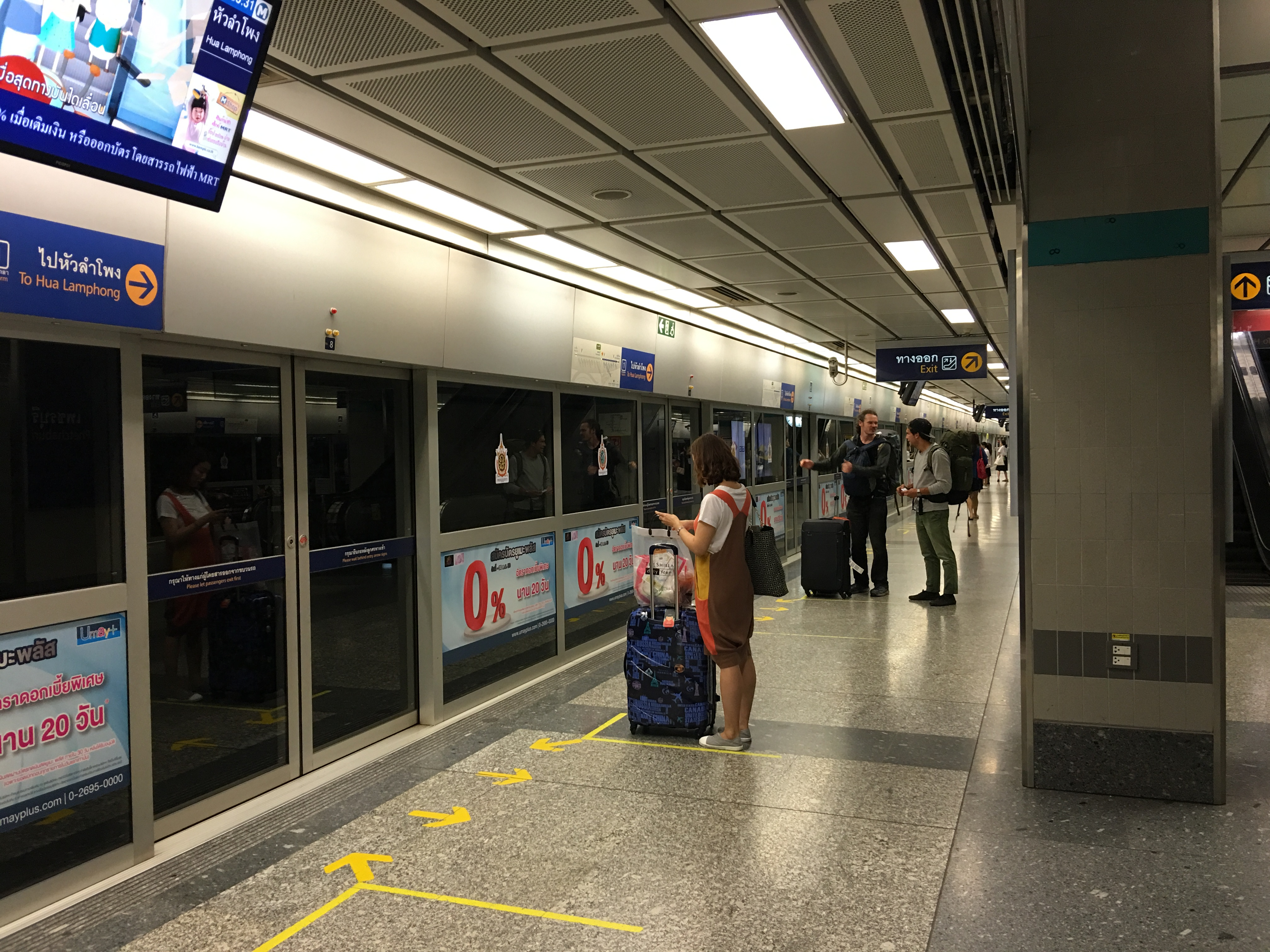
The platform of Phetchaburi MRT station

Officially named Chaloem Ratchamongkhon (Thai สายเฉลิมรัชมงคล) – "Celebration of Royal Auspice" – or informally but commonly called as the "MRT Blue Line", this was the first metro line under the newly formed government agency, the Mass Rapid Transit Authority of Thailand (MRTA). Most civil infrastructure was provided by this government agency and handed over to a private sector on a 25-year concessionaire agreement. The winning bidder was Bangkok Expressway and Metro (BEM). Under this agreement, BEM provides maintenance and engineering equipment, including electrical trains, signalling systems, SCADA, communication, platform screen doors and fully operate the system from Hua Lamphong to Bang Sue. BEM has subcontracted maintenance of the system for 10 years to Siemens and seven-year maintenance contracts to two local maintenance services.

In 1996, the Overseas Economic Cooperation Fund (OECF), later known as the Japan Bank for International Cooperation (JBIC), granted the loans for the project with an official development assistance (ODA) scheme. Construction of the line began on 19 November of that year, when Crown Prince His Royal Highness Crown Prince Maha Vajiralongkorn (later King Vajiralongkorn) came to lay the foundation stone for the construction of the MRT project, which is Thailand's first subway project, with the aim of relieving Bangkok's traffic problems. The first contract was awarded to a joint venture between CH. Karnchang Public Company Limited, Bilfinger-Berger, Kumagai Gumi, and Tokyu Construction Co. for the southern section, while one of the remaining contractors, the northern section, was awarded to ION Joint Venture, which comprises Italian Thai Development, Obayashi Corporation, and Nishimatsu Construction, and the depot was awarded to Siam Nippon Metro Consortium, composed of Hazama Corporation, Maeda Corporation, Mitsui & Co., Kajima, T.S.B. Trading, and Siam Syntech Construction Public Co., Ltd. Tunneling works began on 5 February 1999.

During construction, the consultancy was led by the "Berger-CSC 1 Consortium," comprising the following consulting firms: Louis Berger and many more, as well as a joint venture of Mott Macdonald and De Leuw Cather.

The project suffered multiple delays not only because of the 1997 economic crisis, but also due to challenging civil engineering works of constructing massive underground structures deep in the water-logged soil upon which the city is built. The MRT Blue Line opened for a limited public trial period of several weeks starting on 13 April 2004. On 3 July 2004, the line was officially opened at 19:19 local time by HM King Bhumibol and Queen Sirikit who were accompanied by other members of the royal family. Within 30 minutes of its opening, sightseers filled the system to its maximum capacity, but after the initial rush ridership settled down to around 180,000 riders daily—considerably lower than projections of over 400,000, despite fares being slashed in half from 12 to 38 baht to 10-15 baht per trip. It was scheduled to be opened in 2003, in time for the same year's APEC summit, and later pushed back again to April and then August of the following year. However, no problems were encountered during the test run; the official opening was brought forward.

During the early years, it was named the subway as an alternate name.

=== Extension to Tao Poon ===
As part of the rapid transit master plan the original MRT Blue Line section was planned to be extended from Hua Lamphong to Lak Song, and from Bang Sue to Tha Phra, forming a circle open-loop route. The contract for the first part of extension to Tao Poon was signed on 26 August 2009 as part of MRT Purple Line contract as it provided interchange to the MRT Purple Line. The 1.2 km (0.75 mi) Bang Sue to Tao Poon extension opened on 11 August 2017. This added the first elevated station, Tao Poon, to the Blue line.

=== Extensions to Lak Song and Tha Phra ===
The major extension of the MRT Blue Line was the 27 km (16.8 mi) extension west to Lak Song and from Tao Poon to Tha Phra with 19 stations consisting of four underground and 15 elevated stations. Contracts for civil work were divided into five contracts. Successful bids were announced in late 2010. On 17 February 2011, the five contracts were signed.

Contract	Notes	Length
1	Hua Lamphong to Sanam Chai (2 stations underground, Bt11.65 billion, contractor ITD)	2.8 km (1.7 mi)
2	Sanam Chai to Tha Phra (2 stations underground, Bt10.82B, contractor CK)	2.6 km (1.6 mi)
3	Tao Poon to Tha Phra (8 stations elevated, Bt11.40B, contractor SH-Unique Joint venture)	11 km (6.8 mi)
4	Tha Phra to Lak Song (7 stations elevated, plus a park-and-ride venue and maintenance yard, Bt13.43B, contractor STEC)	10.5 km (6.5 mi)
5	Rolling stock and systems, Bt5.17 billion, contractor CK.	

Construction commenced in mid-2011 for a scheduled 2016 opening but this was subsequently delayed to 2019–2020. In August, 2017, BEM awarded the automatic fare collection ticket for the extension to Thales which to install its TransCity system. The contract also includes ongoing training and future support. In September 2017, BEM announced that Siemens and ST Electronics Thailand were awarded the contract (Contract 5) to supply, install and maintain the E&S systems, install station platform screen doors and fit out the depot. Siemens also won the contract to supply 35 sets of rolling stock.

In 2017, the cabinet approved the amendment of the Blue line concession with BEM, and the new agreement was signed on 31 March 2017. Under the new agreement, BEM will operate the new extensions from Hua Lamphong to Lak Song and Bang Sue to Tha Phra. The concession period was extended from 2029 to 2050.

The extension was opened in stages. The Hua Lamphong - Lak Song extension was opened for trial service on 29 July with full commercial services commencing 29 September 2019.

The Tao Poon - Tha Phra extension opened for limited trial services from 29 November 2019 with full commercial services commencing on 30 March 2020.

=== Phutthamonthon Sai 4 Extension (future) ===
Since 2011, there were requests from residents to extend the line farther from Lak Song west to the Phutthamonthon area. The MRTA indicated a willingness to undertake this extension. In July 2014, the MRTA submitted a request for 84 million baht to complete a route survey for a 7.8 km (4.8 mi), 4 station extension from Lak Song to Phutthamonthon Sai 4. In late March 2017, the Transport Ministry stated that this 7.8 km (4.8 mi) extension would be submitted to Cabinet for approval in April 2017 with construction expected to commence in the 4th quarter of 2017. However, the tender was subsequently delayed until late 2019 due to other projects. In late 2019, the project was put on hold due to government budget constraints. In August 2021, the MRTA confirmed that the extension was not a priority especially given delays with the tenders for the MRT Orange and MRT Purple line extensions.

Code	Station Name	
Code	English	Thai
BL39	Phutthamonthon Sai 2	พุทธมณฑลสาย 2
BL40	Thawi Watthana	ทวีวัฒนา
BL41	Phutthamonthon Sai 3	พุทธมณฑลสาย 3
BL42	Phutthamonthon Sai 4	พุทธมณฑลสาย 4

== Opening timeline ==
Date	Project	Notes
13 April 2004	Mass Rapid Transit Initial Phase	Limited trial service from Bang Sue to Hua Lamphong was commenced
3 July 2004	Mass Rapid Transit Initial Phase	Full commercial service was commenced from Bang Sue to Hua Lamphong.
17 January 2005	Mass Rapid Transit Initial Phase	The entire metro line was closed due to a train collision at Thailand Cultural Centre.
1 February 2005	Mass Rapid Transit Initial Phase	MRT Blue Line reopened.
14 May 2010		The entire metro line was closed from 17.00 onwards due to 2010 Thai military crackdown.
25 May 2010		MRT Blue Line reopened with limited hours from 6:00 to 22:00 due to the curfew.
29 May 2010		Resumed normal service.
22 May 2014		MRT Blue Line operated with limited hours from 6:00 to 21:00 due to the curfew, which was a result of the 2014 Thai coup d'état.
28 May 2014		Service hours were extended to 06.00-23.00
1 June 2014		Phahon Yothin station closed from 10.00 onwards.
8 June 2014		Chatuchak Park station closed from 15.00 onwards.
14 June 2014		Resumed normal service.
6 August 2016	MRT Blue Line Extension Projects (northern section)	Free shuttle bus services between Tao Poon and Bang Sue & free shuttle train services between Bang Son and Bang Sue Junction were deployed due to the delayed opening of the MRT Blue Line's Tao Poon station, which created a missing link between the line and the newly opened MRT Purple Line.
11 August 2017	MRT Blue Line Extension Projects (northern section)	Service extended to Tao Poon.
29 July 2019	MRT Blue Line Extension Projects (southern section)	Free trial shuttle service from Hua Lumphong to Tha Phra commenced. Service on the extension was only available from 10.00 to 16.00. Passengers were required to change trains at Hua Lumphong for service on an extended route.
24 August 2019	MRT Blue Line Extension Projects (southern section)	Shuttle service extended to Bang Wa.
21 September 2019	MRT Blue Line Extension Projects (southern section)	Shuttle service extended to Lak Song. Service hours on the shuttle service were extended to the line's normal service hours of 06.00-24.00.
29 September 2019	MRT Blue Line Extension Projects (southern section)	Full commercial service was commenced from Tao Poon to Lak Song.
4 December 2019	MRT Blue Line Extension Projects (northern section)	Free trial shuttle service from Tao Poon to Sirindhorn commenced. Service on the extension was only available from 10.00 to 16.00. Passengers were required to change trains at Tao Poon for service on an extended route.
23 December 2019	MRT Blue Line Extension Projects (northern section)	Shuttle service was extended to Tha Phra.
1 March 2020	MRT Blue Line Extension Projects (northern section)	Through-service from Tha Phra to Lak Song via Bang Sue
30 March 2020	MRT Blue Line Extension Projects (northern section)	Full commercial service commenced from Tha Phra to Lak Song via Bang Sue.
17 October 2020		The entire metro line was temporarily closed from 12.30 due to the 2020–2021 Thai protests.
18 October 2020		Hua Lamphong, Lumphini, Sukhumvit, Phahon Yothin, and Chatuchak Park stations were temporarily closed due to the protests from 14.30
28 March 2025		All services were halted because of the 2025 Myanmar earthquake.
29 March 2025		Resumed normal service.

== Stations ==
Code	Station Name		Image	Opened	Platform Type	Position	Park & Ride	Transfer	Notes
Code	English	Thai	Image	Opened	Platform Type	Position	Park & Ride	Transfer	Notes
BL01 (Platform 3&4)	Tha Phra	ท่าพระ		23 December 2019; 6 years ago	Island	Elevated	-	Interchange station to • MRT (for Hua Lamphong and Lak Song) • MRL (future)	Exit to Tha Phra Temple
BL02	Charan 13	จรัญฯ 13		23 December 2019; 6 years ago	Side	Elevated	-		Exit to: • HomePro Charansanitwong • Siam Technology College
BL03	Fai Chai	ไฟฉาย		23 December 2019; 6 years ago	Side	Elevated	-		
BL04	Bang Khun Non	บางขุนนนท์		23 December 2019; 6 years ago	Side	Elevated	-	Connecting station to • MRT (under construction) • SRT (future) and Charansanitwong Halt for SRT Southern Line	Exit to: • Makro Charansanitwong • MWA Bangkok Noi • Suwannaram School • Suwannaram Temple • Si Sudaram Temple
BL05	Bang Yi Khan	บางยี่ขัน		23 December 2019; 6 years ago	Side	Elevated	-		Exit to: • Indie Market Pin Klao • Pata Department Store
BL06	Sirindhorn	สิรินธร		4 December 2019; 6 years ago	Side	Elevated	-		
BL07	Bang Phlat	บางพลัด		4 December 2019; 6 years ago	Side	Elevated	-		Exit to Bang Phlat District Office
BL08	Bang O	บางอ้อ		4 December 2019; 6 years ago	Side	Elevated	-		Exit to Yanhee Hospital
BL09	Bang Pho	บางโพ		4 December 2019; 6 years ago	Side	Elevated	-	Connecting station with Bang Pho Pier for: • Mine Smart Ferry • CHAOPHRAYA EXPRESS	Exit to: • Quartermaster School • Gateway At Bangsue
BL10	Tao Poon	เตาปูน		11 August 2017; 9 years ago	Side	Elevated	-	Interchange station to MRT	Exit to: • Tao Poon Market • Lotus's Prachachuen
BL11	Bang Sue	บางซื่อ		3 July 2004; 22 years ago	Side	Underground	-	Connecting station with Krung Thep Aphiwat Central Terminal for • SRT • SRT • ARL (future) • SRT Northern Line • SRT Northeastern Line • SRT Southern Line • HSR Northern Line (future) • HSR Northeastern Line (under construction) • HSR Eastern Line (future) • HSR Southern Line (future)	Exit to: • Siam Cement Group Office • Central Juvenile and Family Court • Bangkok Bus Terminal (Chatuchak)
BL12	Kamphaeng Phet	กำแพงเพชร		3 July 2004; 22 years ago	Island	Underground	√		Exit to: • Or Tor Kor Market • Red Building • Chatuchak Weekend Market • Mixt Chatuchak • J.J Mall
BL13	Chatuchak Park	สวนจตุจักร		3 July 2004; 22 years ago	Island	Underground	-	Connecting station to Mo Chit for BTS	Exit to: • Chatuchak Weekend Market • Mixt Chatuchak • J.J Mall • Chatuchak Park • Children's Discovery Museum • Queen Sirikit Park • Rot Fai Park • Civil Aviation Training Centre • Department of Land Transport
BL14	Phahon Yothin	พหลโยธิน		3 July 2004; 22 years ago	Island	Underground	-	Connecting station to Ha Yaek Lat Phrao for BTS	Exit to: • Central Ladphrao & Centara Grand at Central Ladphrao Hotel • Union Mall
BL15	Lat Phrao	ลาดพร้าว		3 July 2004; 22 years ago	Island	Underground	√	Connecting station to MRT	Exit to: • Ratchada-Lat Phrao Intersection • The Bazaar Hotel Bangkok • Gourmet Market MRT Lat Phrao
BL16	Ratchadaphisek	รัชดาภิเษก		3 July 2004; 22 years ago	Island	Underground	√		
BL17	Sutthisan	สุทธิสาร		3 July 2004; 22 years ago	Island	Underground	-		Exit to: • Sutthisan Police Station • Muang Thai Life Assurance Head Office
BL18	Huai Khwang	ห้วยขวาง		3 July 2004; 22 years ago	Island	Underground	√		
BL19	Thailand Cultural Centre	ศูนย์วัฒนธรรมแห่งประเทศไทย		3 July 2004; 22 years ago	Island	Underground	√	Interchange station to MRT (under construction)	Exit to: • The Esplanade Ratchada • The One Ratchada Market • AIA Capital Centre • Stock Exchange of Thailand • Embassy of The People's Republic of China • Thailand Cultural Centre • China Cultural Centre • Ministry of Culture • Thai Life Insurance Head Office • Big C Place Ratchada • The Street Ratchada • CW Tower • RS Tower
BL20	Phra Ram 9	พระราม 9		3 July 2004; 22 years ago	Island	Underground	√		Exit to: • Central Rama 9 • G Tower • Fortune Town • Jodd Fairs Rama 9 • Uniliver House
BL21	Phetchaburi	เพชรบุรี		3 July 2004; 22 years ago	Island	Underground	√	Connecting station with MRL (future) and Makkasan for • ARL • SRT (future) • HSR Eastern Line (under construction) and Asok for SRT Eastern Line	Exit to: • Singha Complex • Don Bosco Technological College • Saint Dominic School • Srinakharinwirot University
BL22	Sukhumvit	สุขุมวิท		3 July 2004; 22 years ago	Island	Underground	√	Connecting station to Asok for BTS	Exit to: • Terminal 21 • Interchange 21 • Soi Cowboy • Exchange Tower
BL23	Queen Sirikit National Convention Centre	ศูนย์การประชุมแห่งชาติสิริกิติ์		3 July 2004; 22 years ago	Island	Underground	√		Exit to: • Queen Sirikit National Convention Centre • Benjakitti Park • ThaiBev Quarter • Khlong Toei Witthaya School • The Parq • FYI Centre • Khlong Toei Market
BL24	Khlong Toei	คลองเตย		3 July 2004; 22 years ago	Side	Underground	-		Exit to: • MEA Khlong Toei Head Office • MedPark Hospital • Tobacco Authority of Thailand • Benjakitti Park Hospital • Plai Nern Palace
BL25	Lumphini	ลุมพินี		3 July 2004; 22 years ago	Stacked	Underground	-	Connecting station with MRL (future)	Exit to: • One Bangkok • Lumphini Park Gate 2 • Q House Lumphini • Embassy of Germany • Embassy of Japan • Embassy of Australia • Goethe-Institut Thailand
BL26	Si Lom	สีลม		3 July 2004; 22 years ago	Stacked	Underground	-	Connecting station to Sala Daeng for BTS via a 180-metre elevated pedestrian walkway.	Exit to: • Lumphini Park Gate 4 • Dusit Central Park • Silom Edge • Chulalongkorn Hospital • Silom Complex • Thaniya Shopping Centre • Patpong Night Market This station has the longest escalator in Southeast Asia Region at 43-metre.
BL27	Sam Yan	สามย่าน		3 July 2004; 22 years ago	Stacked	Underground	√		Exit to: • Chamchuri Square • Samyan Mitrtown • Hua Lamphong Temple • Chulalongkorn University
BL28	Hua Lamphong	หัวลำโพง		3 July 2004; 22 years ago	Island	Underground	-	Connecting station with Bangkok for • SRT (future) • SRT Northern Line • SRT Northeastern Line • SRT Eastern Line • SRT Southern Line	Exit to: • Khlong Phadung Krung Kasem • Traimit Withayaram Temple • The Chinatown Gate • Yaowarat Road
BL29	Wat Mangkon	วัดมังกร		29 July 2019; 7 years ago	Stacked	Underground	-		Exit to: • Mangkon Kamalawat Temple • Chinatown • Suea Pa Plaza • Kanma Tuyaram Temple
BL30	Sam Yot	สามยอด		29 July 2019; 7 years ago	Stacked	Underground	-	Interchange station with MRT (under construction)	Exit to: • Giant Swing (including Wat Suthat and Wat Dev Mandir) • Khlong Ong Ang • Mega Plaza Saphan Lek • Phahurat • Rommaninat Park • The Old Siam Plaza
BL31	Sanam Chai	สนามไชย		29 July 2019; 7 years ago	Island	Underground	-	Connecting station with Rajinee Pier for • Mine Smart Ferry • CHAOPHRAYA EXPRESS	Exit to: • Museum Siam • Wat Rajabopit School • Rajinee School • Pak Khlong Talat • Wat Pho • The Grand Palace • Wat Phra Kaew • Tha Tian Market • Silpakorn University
BL32	Itsaraphap	อิสรภาพ		29 July 2019; 7 years ago	Island	Underground	-		Exit to: • Wat Ratchasihatharam School • Ratchasihatharam Temple • Mai Phiren Temple
BL01 (Platform 1&2)	Tha Phra	ท่าพระ		29 July 2019; 7 years ago	Side	Elevated	-	Interchange station to • MRT (for Tao Poon and Chatuchak Park) • MRL (future)	Exit to Tha Phra Temple
BL33	Bang Phai	บางไผ่		24 August 2019; 7 years ago	Side	Elevated	-		Exit to: • Wat Nuannoradit School • Nuannoradit Temple • Phaya Thai 3 Hospital
BL34	Bang Wa	บางหว้า		24 August 2019; 7 years ago	Side	Elevated	-	Connecting station to BTS and Bang Wa Pier for Khlong Phasi Charoen Boat Service via a 200-metre elevated pedestrian walkway.	Exit to Siam University
BL35	Phetkasem 48	เพชรเกษม 48		21 September 2019; 7 years ago	Side	Elevated	-		Exit to: Chanpradittharam Witthayakhom School
BL36	Phasi Charoen	ภาษีเจริญ		21 September 2019; 7 years ago	Side	Elevated	-		Exit to Seacon Bangkhae
BL37	Bang Khae	บางแค		21 September 2019; 7 years ago	Side	Elevated	-		Exit to: • Bang Khae Market • Wonder Department Store • Wat Nimmanoradee School • Nimmanoradee Temple • Lotus's Bang Khae • Ban Bang Khae Social Welfare Development • Rajavinit Prathom Bangkhae School
BL38	Lak Song	หลักสอง		21 September 2019; 7 years ago	Side	Elevated	√		Exit to The Mall Lifestore Bangkhae

== Infrastructure ==
=== Depot ===
The MRT Blue Line has two depots. The main maintenance depot, Huai Khwang Depot, is located on Rama IX Road within the premises of the Mass Rapid Transit Authority of Thailand. Construction began in 2005 and was completed the following year. The site is also shared with the MRT Orange Line project.

The secondary depot, Phetkasem Depot, is located on Kanlapaphruek Road. It was built as part of the Blue Line extension projects and was completed in 2019.

=== Park & Ride ===
There are fourteen Park & Ride facilities located at eleven stations, consisting of three Park & Ride buildings and eleven parking lots, with a total capacity of 5,144 vehicles.

=== Station ===
There are 38 stations on the network, 22 of which are underground and 16 of which are elevated.

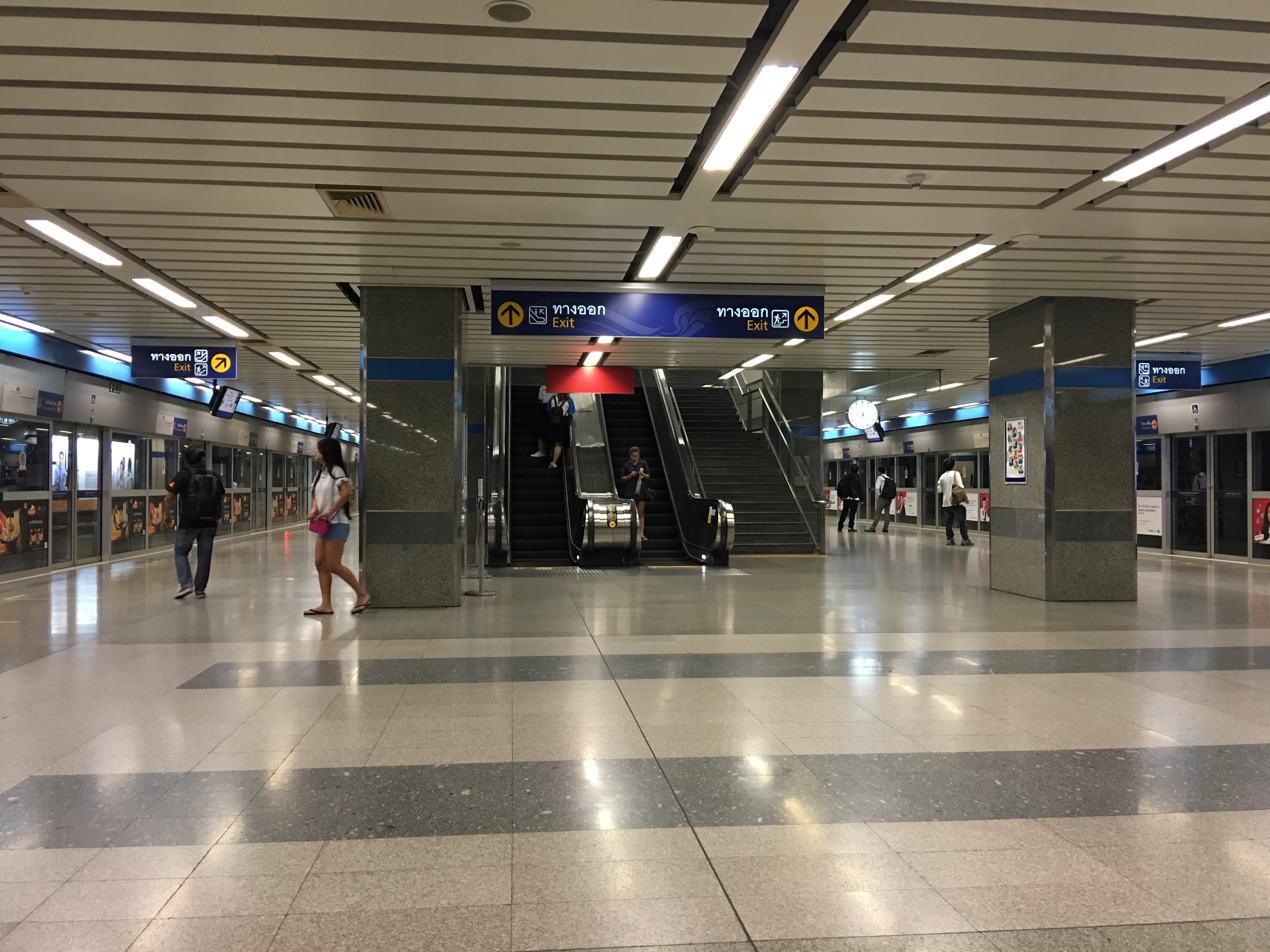
Platforms at Thailand Cultural Centre station

The stations are generally about 150 meters in length, except for the Thailand Cultural Centre Station, which extends to 358 meters due to its role as an interchange station for the MRT Orange Line and as a junction for tracks leading to the Huai Khwang Depot. The stations are designed to accommodate a maximum of six cars per train. All stations are equipped with both half-height and full-height platform screen doors. The underground stations and tracks are designed to be durable and resilient to land subsidence and to withstand vibrations in the event of an earthquake, without causing damage to the structure. The entrances to the stations are designed to be about one meter above ground level to accommodate potential flooding events in the future, based on the highest recorded flood levels in Bangkok. Elevated stations are designed to avoid underground and above-ground utilities and to preserve the road surface as much as possible. In general, station pillars are located in the median of roads, except for stations that need to span underground tunnels, where the station pillars are placed on the sidewalks instead.

=== Rolling stocks ===
The MRT Blue line is served by 54 three-car trains of which, 19 are first generation Siemens Modular Metro sets and 35 sets are second generation. The trains are powered by 750 V DC via third rail system, are air-conditioned and capable of traveling at up to 80 km/h (50 mph).

==== Siemens Modular Metro EMU-IBL ====
Nineteen three-car Siemens Modular Metro were ordered for the initial part of the line. The trains entered service on 3 July 2004. In 2017, BEM starts removing some seats from the train to increase interior space to cope with rising number of passengers. In 2019, the BEM stated that it is interested in refurbishing the first generation trains. Including the CCTV cameras, and new dynamic route map replacing the traditional ones.

In 2000, Alstom won a contract to supply 21x3 car Metropolis train sets, and this design would have been similar to C751A used for Singapore's North East MRT line if it had been built. The trains were provided by a consortium called Nippon-Euro Subway Consortium, which also includes Mitsubishi Electric. Mitsubishi Corporation, another consortium member, had also planned to undertake it. However, the negotiations with the French firm have failed. The bidding for rolling stock was conducted again, and bidders include Bombardier Transportation (later acquired by Alstom in 2021) and Siemens, both from Canada and Germany. On 3 January 2002, Siemens won the contract for a cost of $385 million.

In late 2019, IBL trains were refurbished with the installation of CCTV, LED lights, and an LCD dynamic route map.

	← Tha Phra Lak Song →		
Car No.	1	2	3
Designation	M1	Tc1	M2
Length (mm)	21,800	21,500	21,800
Numbering	1001; 1003; 1005 : 1013; 1015; 1017 : 1025; 1027; 1029 : 1037	3001; 3002; 3003 : 3007; 3008; 3009 : 3013; 3014; 3015 : 3019	1002; 1004; 1006 : 1014; 1028*; 1018 : 1026; 1016*; 1030 : 1038

* Car 1016 and 1028 were swapped after the train collision in 2005.

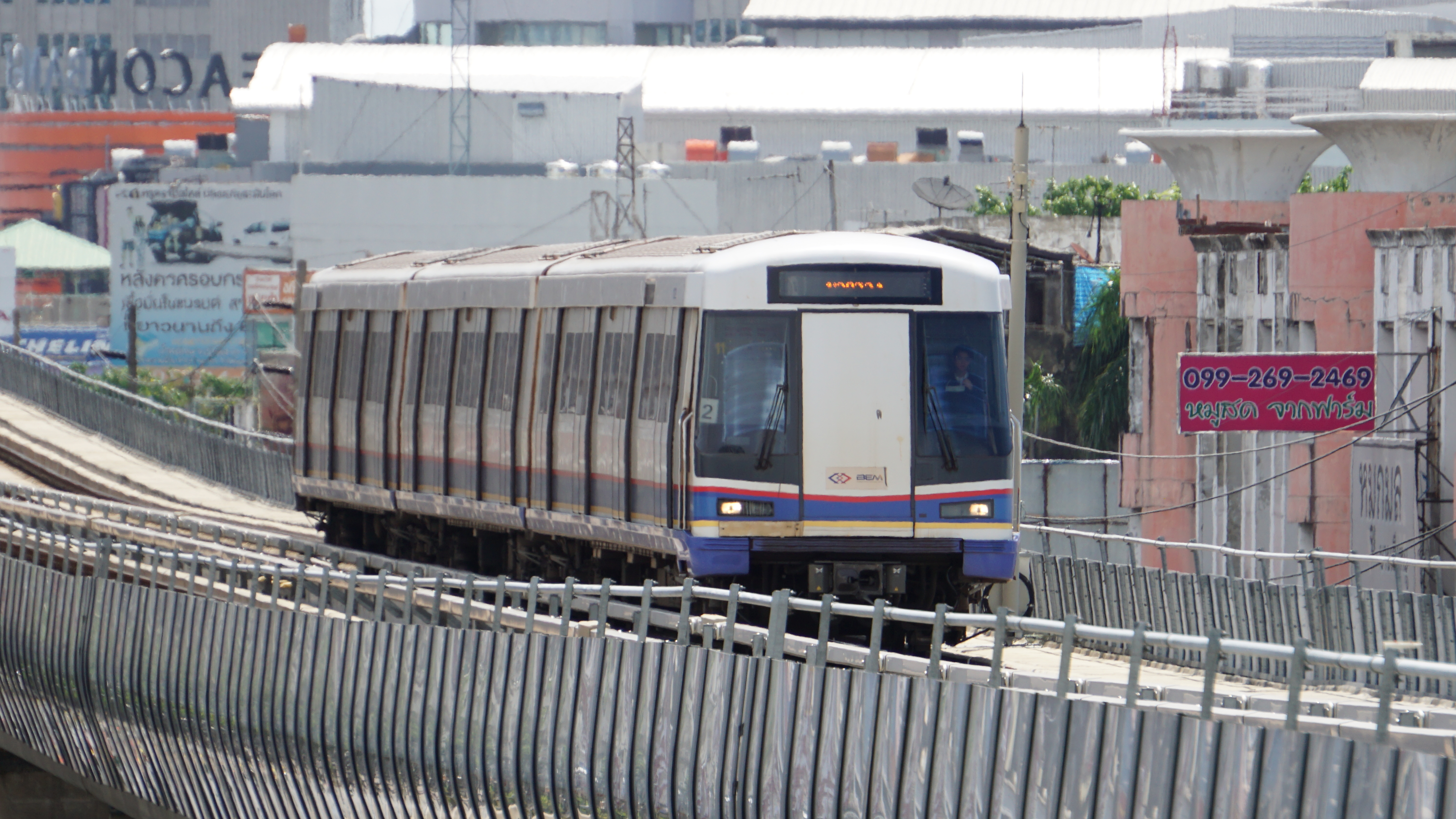
The first generation train, Siemens Modular Metro EMU-IBL (Initial Blue Line stock)

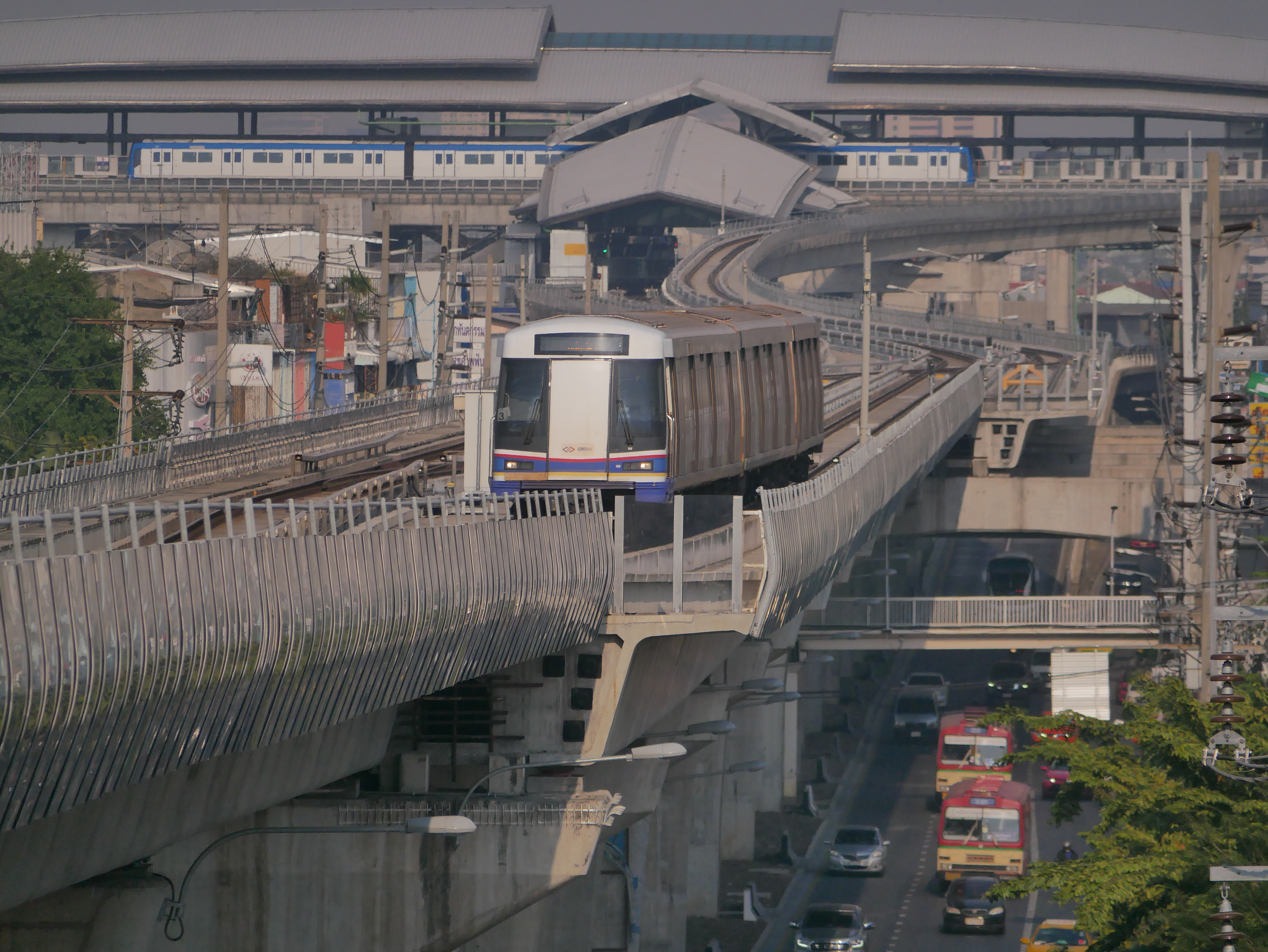
EMU-IBL approaching Bang Phai station with Tha Phra station in the background

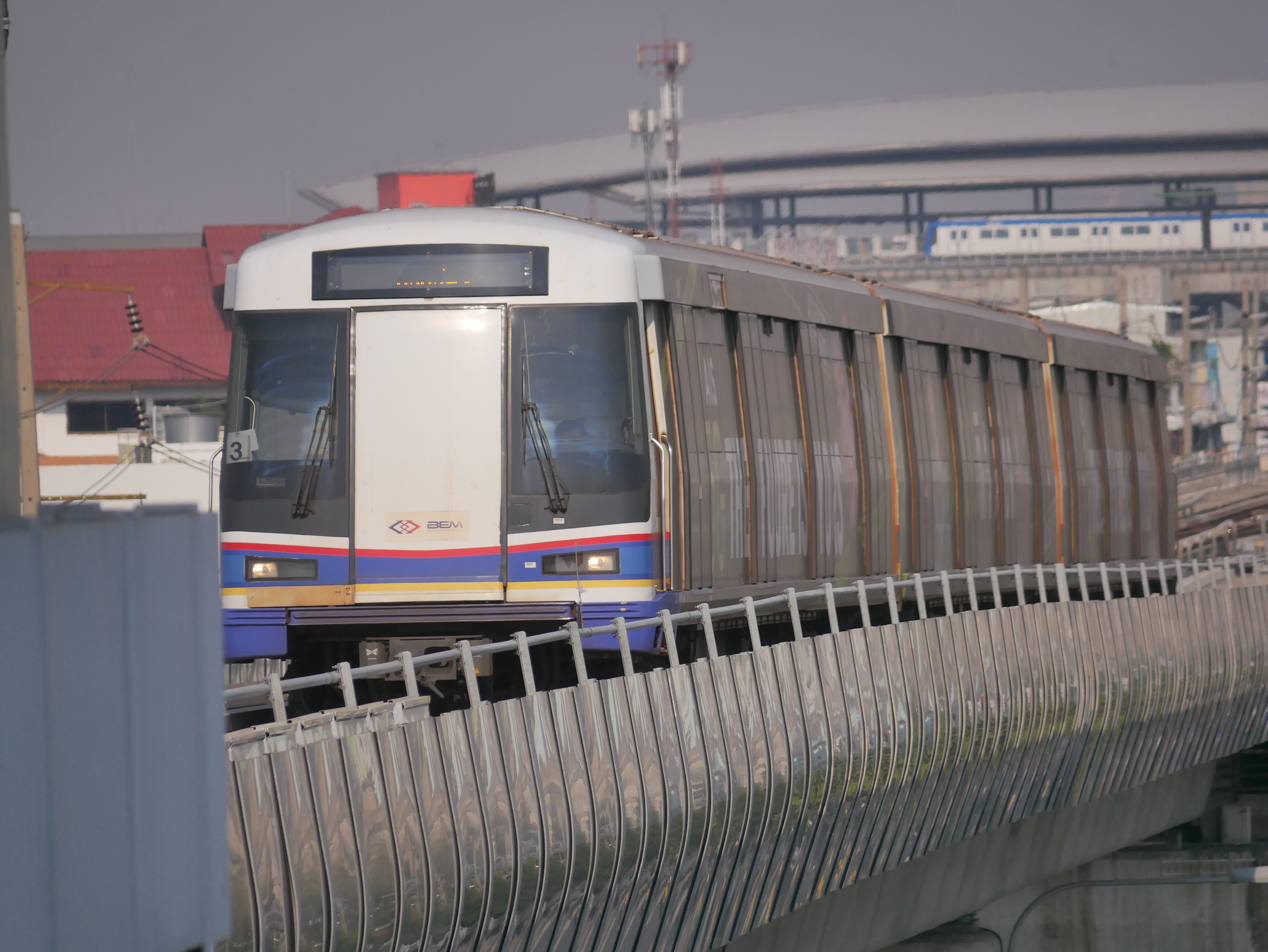
Another picture of EMU-IBL approaching Bang Phai station

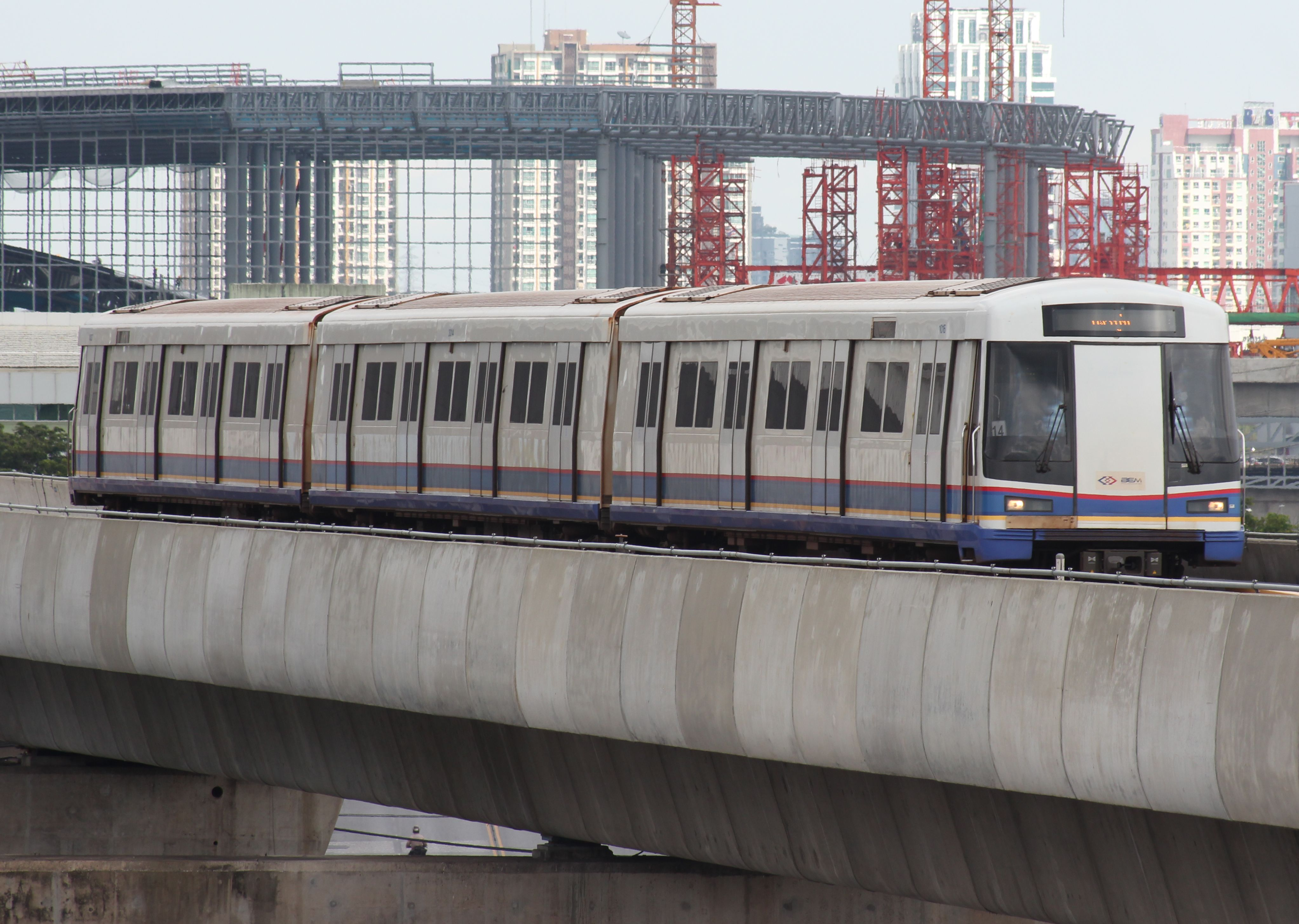
EMU-IBL approaching Tao Poon station with the unfinished Krung Thep Aphiwat Central Terminal in the background in 2018

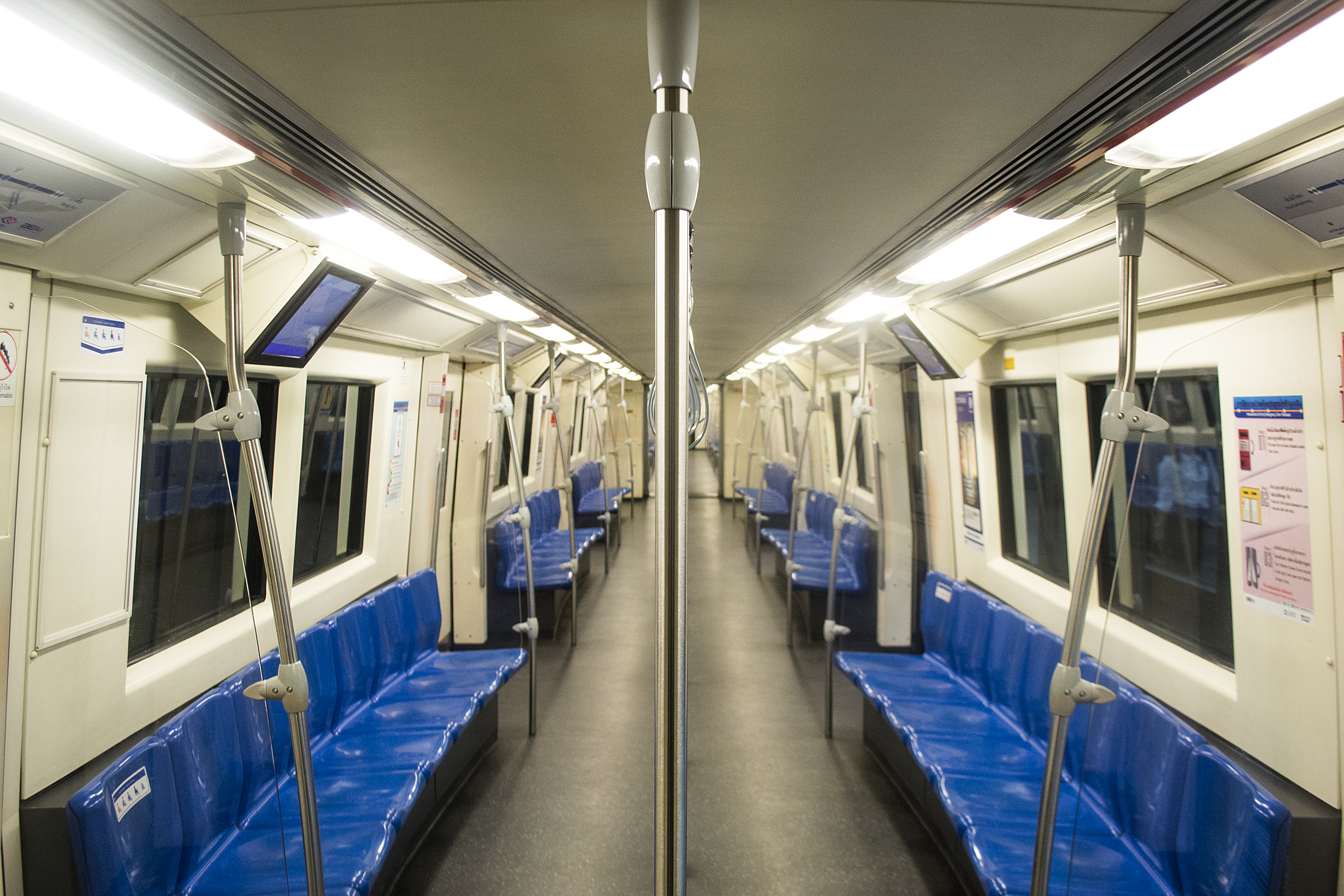
The interior of EMU-IBL before the refurbishment

==== Siemens EMU-BLE ====
In 2017, BEM ordered 35 three-car as part of the line extension program. Under the contract, Siemens were to supply 35 trains and provide maintenance for ten years with a price tag of 20 billion baht. The fleet was built at the Siemens plant in Vienna and tested in Germany. The first train arrived in 2019 with all trains delivered by early 2020.

	← Tha Phra Lak Song →		
Car No.	1	2	3
Designation	M1	Tc1	M2
Length (mm)	21,800	21,500	21,800
Numbering	1039; 1041; 1043 : 1107	3020; 3021; 3022 : 3054	1040; 1042; 1044 : 1108

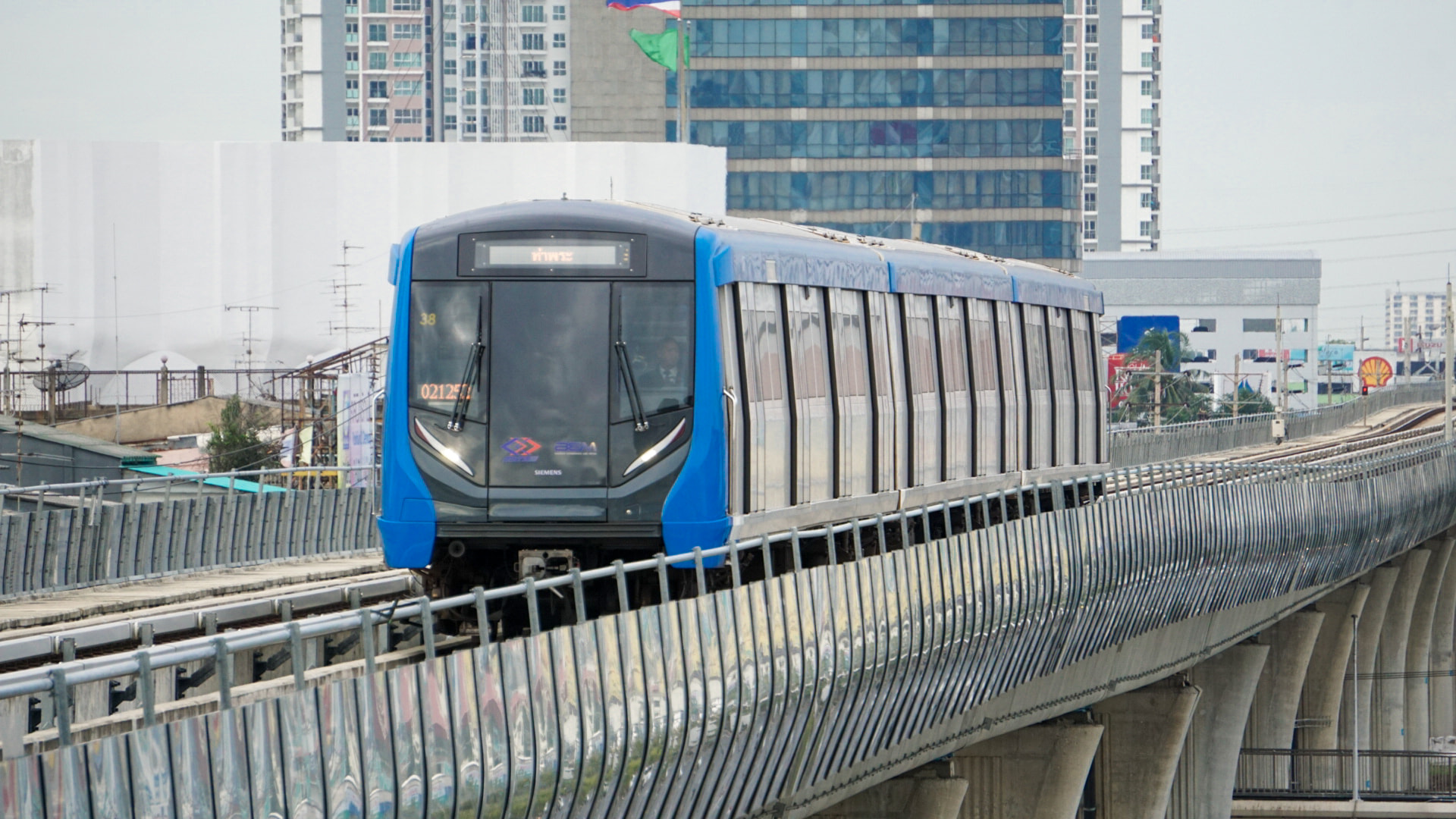
The second generation train, Siemens EMU-BLE (Blue Line Extension stock)

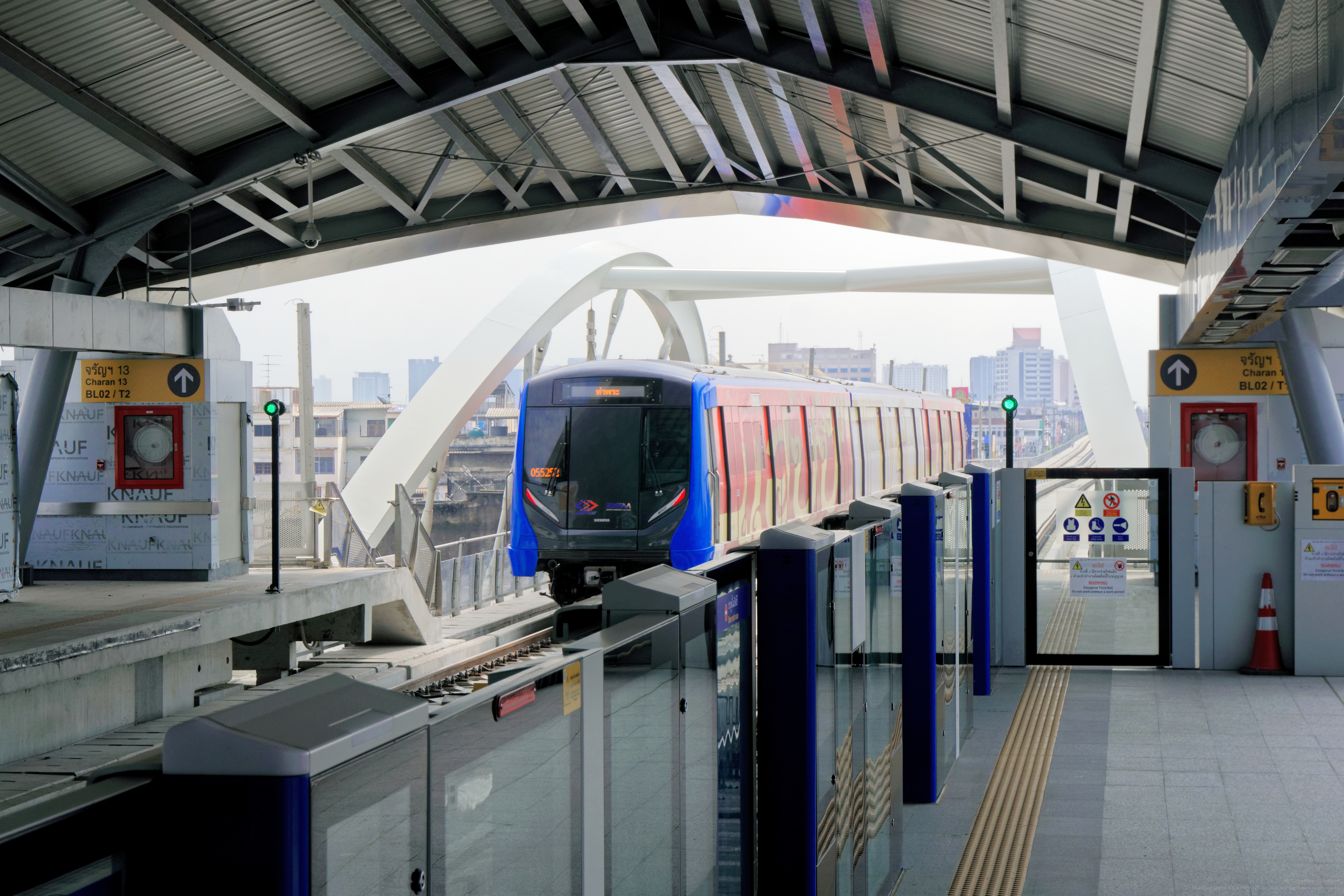
EMU-BLE departing Fai Chai station

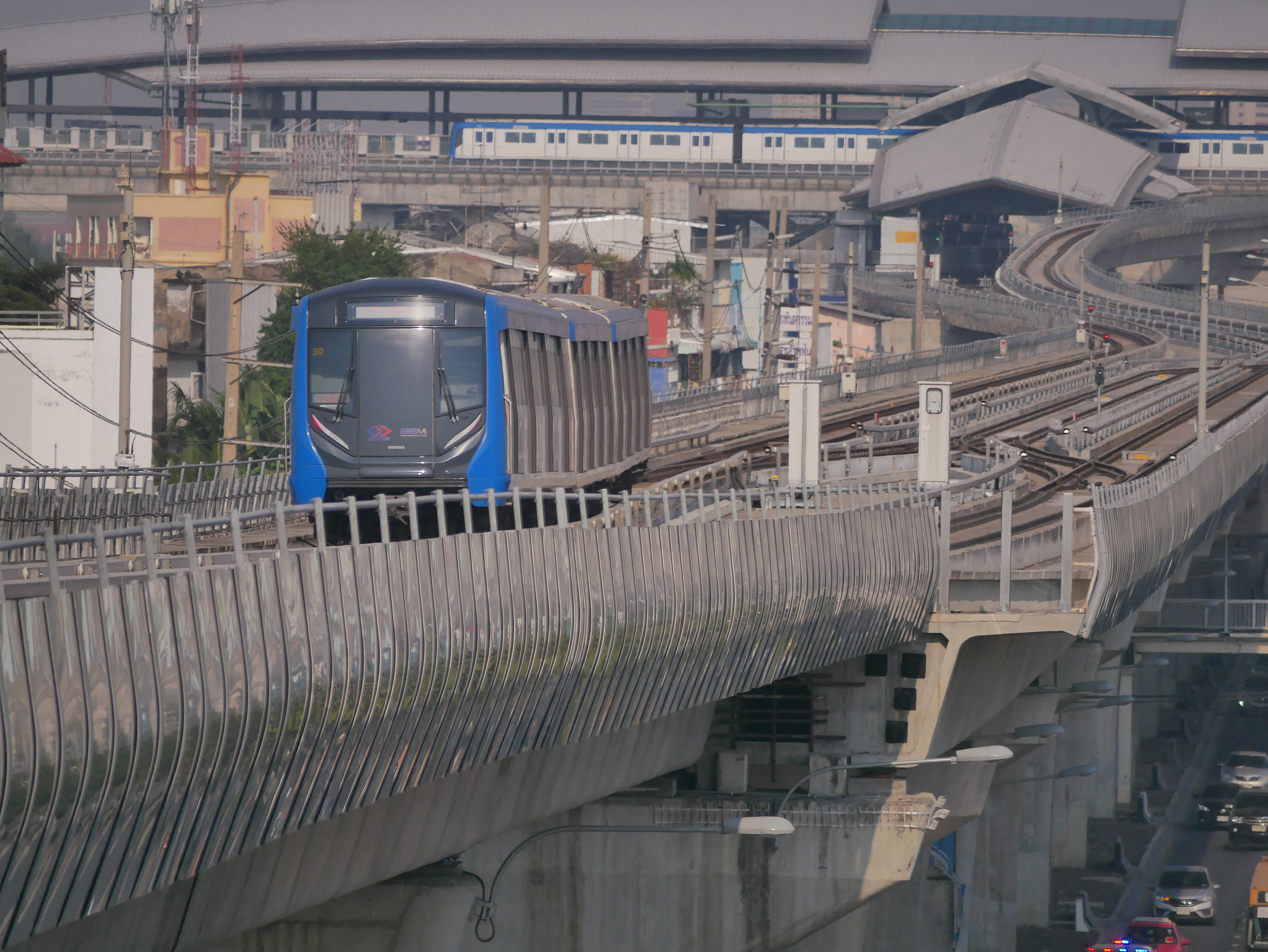
EMU-BLE approaching Bang Phai station with Tha Phra station in the background.

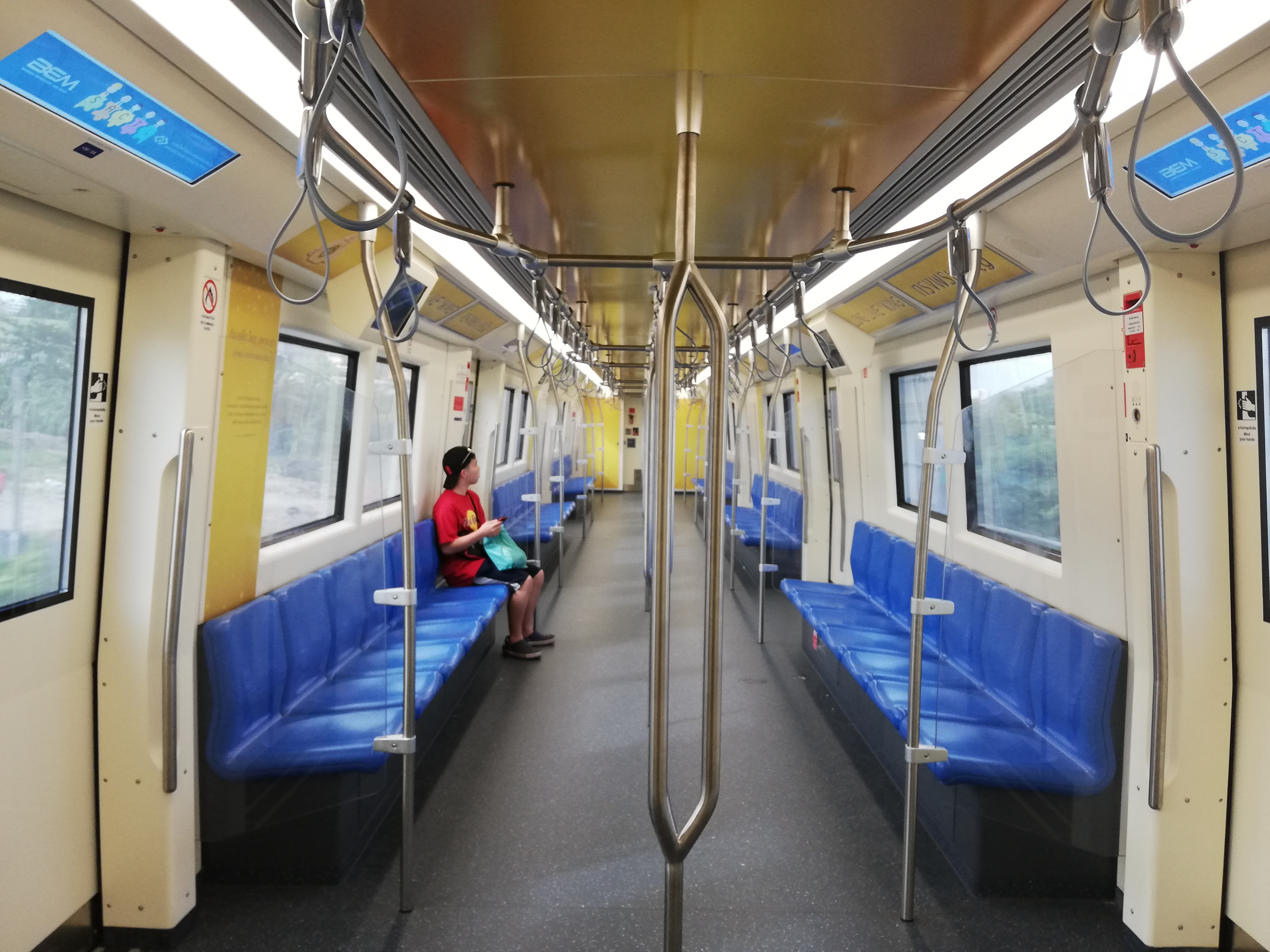
Interior of the EMU-BLE

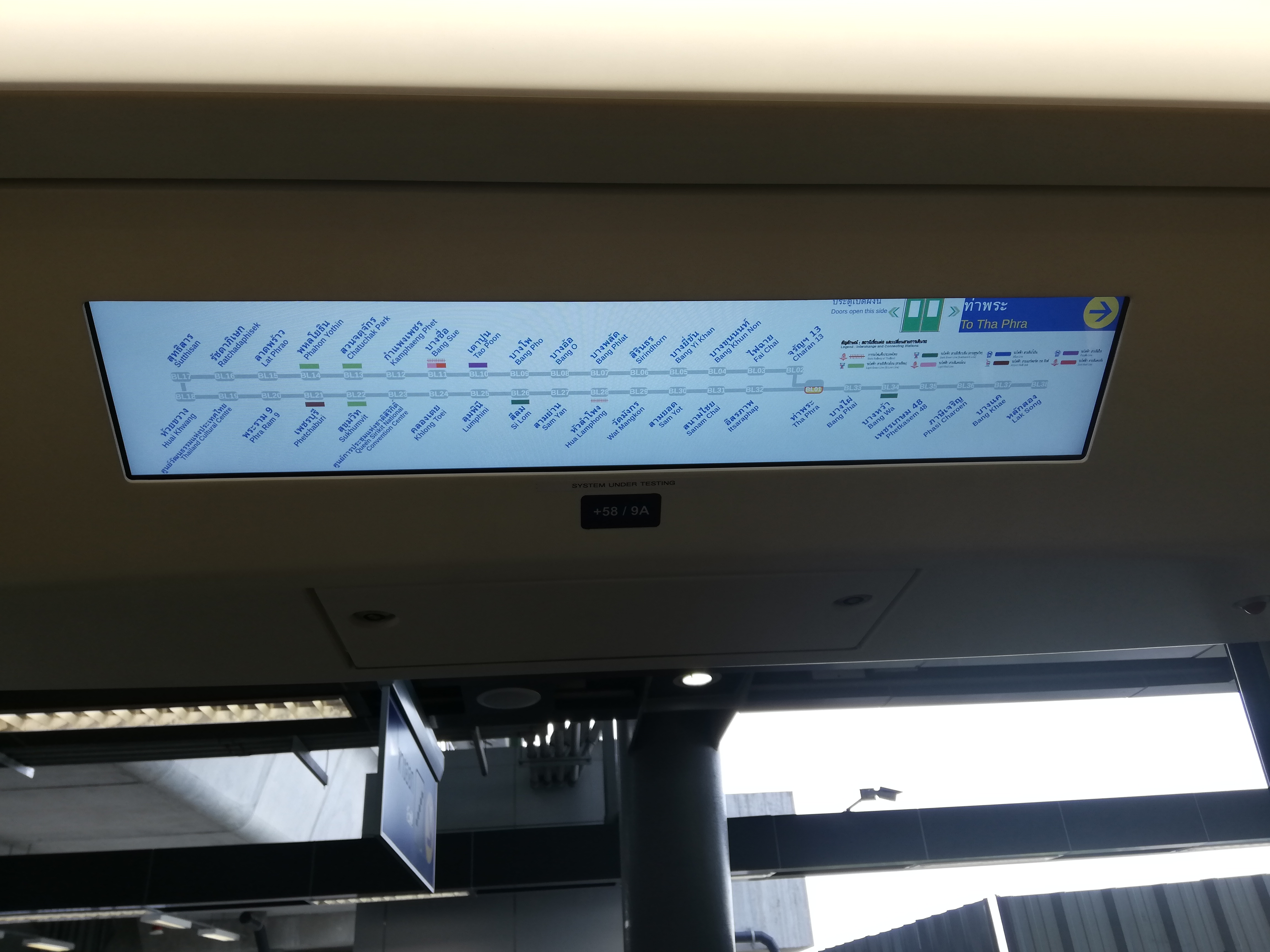
Dynamic Route Map on the EMU-BLE

==== Extra rolling stock order ====
On 18 July 2024, Mr. Phongsarit Tantisuvanitchkul, executive chairman of BEM revealed that the company will order an additional 21 train sets, each comprising three cars, for the MRT Blue line to meliorate congestion during peak hour. The turnkey contract was announced on 18 December 2024. A consortium consisting of Siemens and Bozankaya won a contract from Ch. Karnchang. The contract includes the supply of 21 Siemens three-car trains, with the design same as the EMU-BLE fleet that is currently used on the project. These trains will be manufactured at the Bozankaya Factory in Ankara, Turkey. Siemens and ST Electronics will supply the bogies, traction, braking, and auxiliary systems, and will be responsible for project management, development, construction, and commissioning. Siemens will also provide service and maintenance for 15 years, from 2024 to 2039.

=== Signaling system ===
Siemens Trainguard LZB700M signaling system, a Fixed Block system, has been implemented on the MRT Blue Line. It utilizes a computer-based system to automatically control train operations for maximum efficiency, speed, and safety. The system is divided into three subsystems:

- Automatic Train Operation (ATO) – Controls various functions of the train, such as propulsion, speed regulation, braking, stopping the train, and reporting the status of various components to the control center.
- Automatic Train Protection (ATP) – Ensures that the train does not exceed the set speed limit and regulates the train's speed relative to the distance from the train ahead. In the event of abnormal situations, ATP will automatically apply the brakes. It also prevents the train from departing a station if the train doors or platform screen doors are not properly closed. Unlike ATO, which can be manually overridden if it malfunctions, ATP continues to control train operations independently.
- Automatic Train Supervision (ATS) – Oversees the entire train network to ensure that operations adhere to the timetable. It monitors and displays the speed and location of all trains within the system and prepares control measures in case of disruptions.

== Operation ==
=== Service hour ===
The MRT Blue Line operates from 05:30 to 24:00 on weekdays and from 06:00 to 24:00 on weekends and public holidays. During the weekday morning rush hour, there are two service patterns:

- Full Line operation from Tha Phra to Lak Song.
- Short-run train from Bang Pho to Lak Song.

Additionally, some trains may terminate at Chatuchak Park or Bang Wa stations during rush hour.

=== Headways ===
MRT Blue Line headway
Time	Section	Headway (Minutes:Seconds)
Monday - Friday
05.30 - 07.00	Full Line	05:00
07:00 - 09:00	BL01 Tha Phra - BL09 Bang Pho	06:58
07:00 - 09:00	BL09 Bang Pho - BL38 Lak Song	03:29
09:00 - 16:30	Full Line	06:40
16:30 - 17:00	Full Line	05:00
17:00 - 20:00	Full Line	03:50
20:00 - 21:00	Full Line	05:20
21:00 - 24:00	Full Line	07:15
Saturday
06:00 - 11:00	Full Line	07:15
11:00 - 16:00	Full Line	06:30
16:00 - 21:00	Full Line	05:30
21:00 - 24:00	Full Line	07:15
Sunday and Public Holiday
06:00 - 17:00	Full Line	07:15
17:00 - 21:00	Full Line	06:30
21:00 - 24:00	Full Line	07:15

=== Ridership ===
At opening in 2004, initial ridership was 180,000 per day—considerably lower than the projections of over 400,000. By 2016, the average daily ridership was 273,637. By September 2017, BEM stated that average daily ridership had increased to 360,000 after the opening of the extension to Tao Poon.

After the opening of the extension to Lak Song on 29 September 2019, average daily ridership increased to 400,000. The MRT Blue line was expected to grow to a daily ridership of 800,000 once the Lak Song and Tha Phra extensions opened. However, the impact of the COVID-19 pandemic by late 2020 had resulted in a dramatic reduction of ridership down to an average of 360,000 per weekday reverting to September 2017 levels. By August 2021, during a COVID-19 3rd wave in Bangkok ridership plummeted to only 76,000 per weekday. In 2023 an average of 376,000 passengers rode the blue line.

From 25 January to 31 January 2025, Prime Minister Paetongtarn Shinawatra has implemented a policy of free public transportation in Bangkok for one week. This measure aims to address the worsening air pollution caused by surging dust levels across all districts of the capital.

MRT Blue Line Ridership
Year	Quarter	Quarterly Ridership	Daily Ridership	Annual Ridership	Remarks
2004	Q1			26,695,557	
2004	Q2			26,695,557	
2004	Q3	14,771,017	165,967	26,695,557	BL10 Bang Sue - BL28 Hua Lamphong section opened on 3 July 2004.
2004	Q4	11,924,540	129,615	26,695,557	
2005	Q1	11,839,737	155,787	57,204,154	Train collision at BL19 Thailand Cultural Centre station caused the entire line to be closed from 17 January 2004 until 31 January 2004.
2005	Q2	15,032,372	165,191	57,204,154	
2005	Q3	15,270,957	165,989	57,204,154	
2005	Q4	15,061,088	163,708	57,204,154	
2006	Q1	14,196,691	157,742	57,826,397	
2006	Q2	13,806,282	151,718	57,826,397	
2006	Q3	14,630,414	159,027	57,826,397	
2006	Q4	15,193,010	165,142	57,826,397	
2007	Q1	14,472,879	160,810	59,922,345	
2007	Q2	14,634,584	160,820	59,922,345	
2007	Q3	15,385,544	167,235	59,922,345	
2007	Q4	15,429,338	167,711	59,922,345	
2008	Q1	15,571,126	171,112	62,108,418	
2008	Q2	14,697,561	161,512	62,108,418	
2008	Q3	15,720,108	170,871	62,108,418	
2008	Q4	16,119,623	175,214	62,108,418	
2009	Q1	15,824,077	175,824	63,749,784	
2009	Q2	15,133,589	164,496	63,749,784	
2009	Q3	16,086,300	174,852	63,749,784	
2009	Q4	16,705,818	181,585	63,749,784	
2010	Q1	16,657,590	185,085	64,927,467	
2010	Q2	14,088,416	169,740	64,927,467	MRT Blue Line was closed from 14 May 2010 until 25 May 2010 due to the 2010 Thai military crackdown.
2010	Q3	17,149,043	186,403	64,927,467	ARL Airport Rail Link opened on 23 August 2010, and BL21 Phetchaburi station became a connecting station.
2010	Q4	17,032,418	185,135	64,927,467	
2011	Q1	17,256,842	191,743	69,040,480	
2011	Q2	16,412,289	180,355	69,040,480	
2011	Q3	18,861,231	205,014	69,040,480	
2011	Q4	16,510,118	179,458	69,040,480	MRT Blue Line daily ridership decreased due to 2011 Thailand floods.
2012	Q1	20,051,013	220,341	80,602,327	
2012	Q2	18,988,016	208,660	80,602,327	
2012	Q3	20,876,732	226,921	80,602,327	
2012	Q4	20,686,566	224,854	80,602,327	
2013	Q1	20,995,960	233,289	86,435,968	
2013	Q2	20,728,994	227,792	86,435,968	
2013	Q3	22,268,239	242,047	86,435,968	
2013	Q4	22,442,775	243,944	86,435,968	
2014	Q1	24,949,649	277,219	92,437,991	
2014	Q2	21,654,739	237,965	92,437,991	
2014	Q3	22,705,980	246,805	92,437,991	
2014	Q4	23,127,623	251,388	92,437,991	
2015	Q1	23,482,811	260,921	95,018,696	
2015	Q2	22,592,917	248,274	95,018,696	
2015	Q3	24,585,847	267,238	95,018,696	
2015	Q4	24,357,121	264,752	95,018,696	
2016	Q1	24,752,983	272,011	100,369,988	
2016	Q2	23,429,701	257,470	100,369,988	
2016	Q3	26,036,662	283,008	100,369,988	Free shuttle bus services between BL10 Tao Poon and BL11 Bang Sue were deployed to fill in the missing link between the line and the newly opened MRT Purple Line.
2016	Q4	26,150,642	284,247	100,369,988	
2017	Q1	26,487,114	294,302	107,537,778	
2017	Q2	25,560,321	280,883	107,537,778	
2017	Q3	28,064,600	305,050	107,537,778	BL10 Tao Poon - BL11 Bang Sue section opened on 11 August 2017, BL10 Tao Poon became an interchange station
2017	Q4	27,425,743	298,106	107,537,778	
2018	Q1	28,104,618	312,274	113,711,335	
2018	Q2	26,974,909	296,428	113,711,335	
2018	Q3	29,356,120	319,089	113,711,335	
2018	Q4	29,275,688	318,214	113,711,335	
2019	Q1	29,075,352	323,060	123,621,585	
2019	Q2	27,011,565	296,831	123,621,585	
2019	Q3	32,505,523	353,321	123,621,585	BL28 Hua Lamphong - BL38 Lak Song section opened, BL34 Bang Wa became an interchange station. Mo Chit - Ha Yaek Lat Phrao section opened, BL14 Phahon Yothin became a connecting station.
2019	Q4	35,029,145	380,752	123,621,585	BL01 Tha Phra - BL10 Tao Poon section opened, BL01 Tha Phra became a self-interchange station.
2020	Q1	30,392,770	333,987	95,601,532	1st wave of COVID-19 outbreaks (January 2020 - May 2020)
2020	Q2	12,120,957	133,198	95,601,532	1st wave of COVID-19 outbreaks (January 2020 - May 2020)
2020	Q3	26,095,682	283,649	95,601,532	
2020	Q4	26,992,123	293,393	95,601,532	2nd wave of COVID-19 outbreaks (December 2020 - February 2021)
2021	Q1	19,232,363	213,693	53,529,435	2nd wave of COVID-19 outbreaks (December 2020 - February 2021)
2021	Q2	10,834,779	119,064	53,529,435	3rd wave of COVID-19 outbreaks (April 2021 - June 2021)
2021	Q3	7,331,345	79,689	53,529,435	4th wave of COVID-19 outbreaks (July 2021 - early 2022) SRT Dark Red Line and SRT Light Red Line opened on 21 August 2021, BL11 Bang Sue became a connecting station.
2021	Q4	16,130,948	175,337	53,529,435	4th wave of COVID-19 outbreaks (July 2021 - early 2022) SRT Dark Red Line and SRT Light Red Line opened on 21 August 2021, BL11 Bang Sue became a connecting station.
2022	Q1	16,902,272	187,804	99,001,410	4th wave of COVID-19 outbreaks (July 2021 - early 2022) SRT Dark Red Line and SRT Light Red Line opened on 21 August 2021, BL11 Bang Sue became a connecting station.
2022	Q2	20,996,415	230,730	99,001,410	4th wave of COVID-19 outbreaks (July 2021 - early 2022) SRT Dark Red Line and SRT Light Red Line opened on 21 August 2021, BL11 Bang Sue became a connecting station.
2022	Q3	28,764,950	312,663	99,001,410	
2022	Q4	32,337,773	351,498	99,001,410	
2023	Q1	34,513,622	383,485	144,105,284	SRT long-distance train services moved to Krung Thep Aphiwat Central Terminal on 19 January 2023.
2023	Q2	32,262,358	354,532	144,105,284	
2023	Q3	38,739,263	421,079	144,105,284	MRT Yellow Line opened on 3 July 2023, BL15 Lat Phrao became a connecting station.
2023	Q4	38,590,041	419,457	144,105,284	
2024	Q1	39,428,634	433,282	156,827,292	
2024	Q2	36,037,227	396,014	156,827,292	
2024	Q3	40,495,053	440,164	156,827,292	
2024	Q4	40,866,378	444,200	156,827,292	
2025	Q1	40,231,680	447,019	156,443,901	Free public transportation policy was implemented between 25 and 31 January 2025. Train services were temporarily suspended due to 2025 Myanmar Earthquake on 28 March 2025.
2025	Q2	36,447,300	400,850	156,443,901	
2025	Q3	39,660,085	431,088	156,443,901	
2025	Q4	40,104,836	435,923	156,443,901	As of December 2025.
2026	Q1	39,971,686	444,130	115,144,255	
2026	Q2	35,633,399	391,576	115,144,255	
2026	Q3	39,539,170	429,774	115,144,255	As of September 2026
2026	Q4			115,144,255	

=== Fares ===
Fares for the MRT Blue Line are calculated based on the shortest travel distance between the origin and destination stations, regardless of the actual route taken. Passengers may stay within the system for up to 180 minutes; exceeding this limit will result in a penalty fare. Regular fares range from 17 to 45 baht, with a maximum fare of 51 baht when transferring to the Purple Line. Discounted fares are available for children under 14 years old and senior citizens, ranging from 9 to 23 baht (up to 36 baht with a transfer to the Purple Line), while student fares range from 14 to 41 baht (up to 48 baht with a transfer to the Purple Line).

Starting in 2024, passengers using a credit/debit card, Visa, or Mastercard will receive a 15 baht discount when transferring from the Blue Line to the Yellow Line, or a 14 baht discount when transferring from the Yellow Line to the Blue Line. Furthermore, senior citizens will receive an 8 baht discount when transferring from the Blue Line to the Yellow Line, and a 7 baht discount when transferring from the Yellow Line to the Blue Line. Students will receive a 15 baht discount when transferring from the Blue Line to the Yellow Line, and a 13 baht discount when transferring from the Yellow Line to the Blue Line.

== Incidents ==
=== Train collision ===
On 17 January 2005, just after 09:15, an empty train returning to the depot collided with a peak-hour train filled with passengers at the Thailand Cultural Centre station. Around 100-262 people, depending on the news source, were injured. Most of whom sustained only minor injuries, and the entire Metro network was shut down for two weeks. On 31 January 2005, then prime minister Thaksin Shinawatra rode the metro to increase public confidence in the system.

After initial investigations, it was found that the empty train had run into problems shortly before the accident, grinding to a halt on a curve leading to the depot. The driver applied its brake and was waiting to be towed to the depot close to Thailand Cultural Centre station. A rescue train was attempting to connect to the stalled train when the driver was told to release the brake while coupling had not yet been successful. It was then that the empty train began to roll backwards at a speed of ten meters per second, before smashing into the other train, which was carrying passengers. Therefore, it was believed that the incident was caused by negligence due to insufficient training of operation staff. This accident also resulted in two damaged trains with heavily damaged areas limited to the two leading cars. The colliding speed was suspected to be about 60 km/h due to the appearance of damaged areas. However, one train, which was rebuilt from the repair of the minor-damaged cars, was already fitted for operation at the end of 2006 and the remaining one was still under heavy repair until mid of 2007; it was released into service in October 2007. The cost resulting from the accident might be a much higher figure than BEM quoted, and it was expected to be at least 400 million baht, which was totally insured by a local insurance company.

The line resumed full operations on 1 February 2005. Passenger numbers soon rose back to pre-crash levels, partly due to a temporary promotional fare scheme which allowed passengers to travel any distance on the MRT for only ten baht.

=== 2025 Myanmar earthquake ===
On March 28, a 7.7-magnitude earthquake in Myanmar struck Bangkok, leading to the temporary suspension of all train services to ensure readiness for resumption and to prepare for potential aftershocks. The line resumed normal service on the next day.

== Route map ==

Route of the Blue Line

== Network map ==
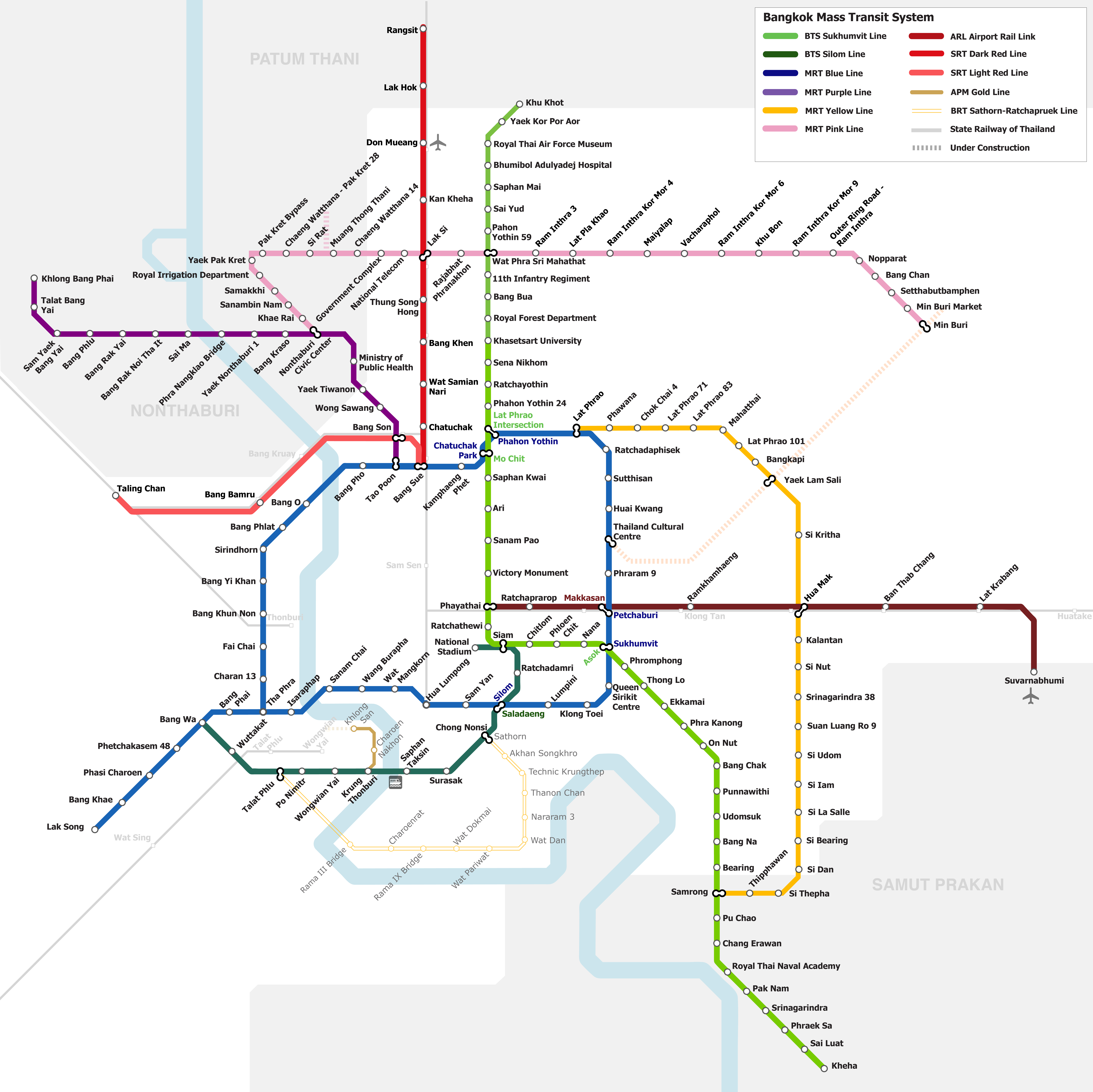

== See also ==
- Mass Rapid Transit Master Plan in Bangkok Metropolitan Region
- MRT (Bangkok)
- MRT Brown Line
- MRT Grey Line
- MRT Light Blue Line
- MRT Orange Line
- MRT Pink Line
- MRT Purple Line
- MRT Yellow Line
- BTS Skytrain
- BTS Sukhumvit Line
- BTS Silom Line
- AERA1 City
- SRT Light Red Line
- SRT Dark Red Line
- Bangkok BRT
- BMA Gold Line
