= Sutthisan MRT station =

Mass Rapid Transit station in Thailand

Coordinates: 13.7900°N 100.5740°E

สุทธิสาร Sutthisan
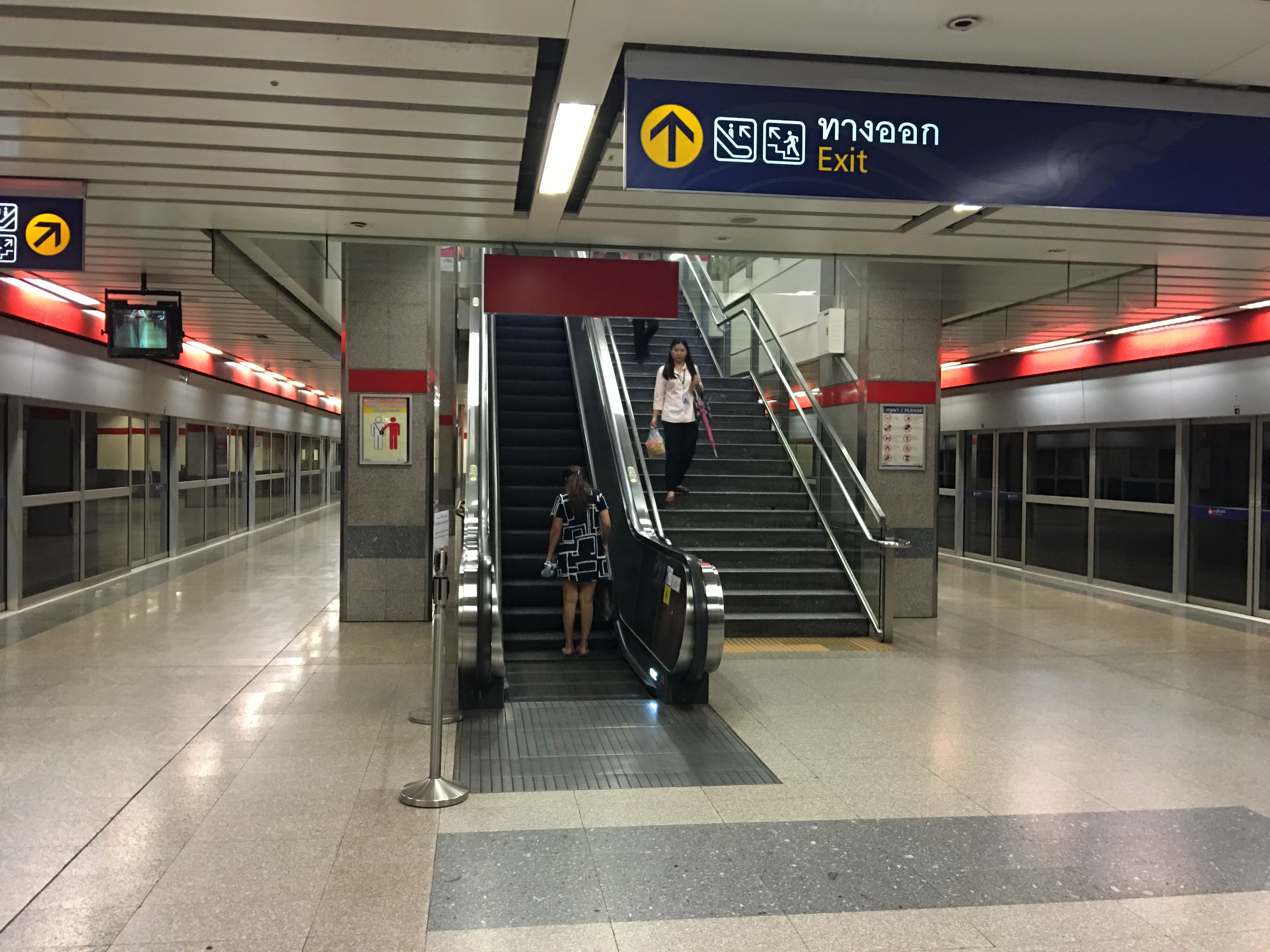

General information
- Location: Din Daeng and Huai Khwang, Bangkok, Thailand
- System: MRT
- Owner: Mass Rapid Transit Authority of Thailand (MRTA)
- Operator: Bangkok Expressway and Metro Public Company Limited (BEM)
- Line: MRT Blue Line
- Platforms: 1 island platform
- Tracks: 2

Construction
- Structure type: Underground
- Accessible: yes

Other information
- Station code: BL17

History
- Opened: 3 July 2004; 22 years ago

Passengers
- 2021: 3,593,015

Services
Preceding station	Metropolitan Rapid Transit	Following station
Huai Khwang towards Lak Song	Blue Line	Ratchadaphisek towards Tha Phra via Bang Sue
Location

Sutthisan station (Thai: สถานีสุทธิสาร, code BL17) is a Bangkok MRT station on the Blue Line located under Ratchadaphisek Road, near Sutthisan neighbourhood, Bangkok, Thailand. The station's symbol color is red.

== Station layout ==
G	-	Bus stop
B1	Basement	Exits 1–3
B2	Concourse	Ticket machines
B3	Platform 2	Blue towards Tha Phra via Bang Sue (Ratchadaphisek)
B3	Island platform, doors will open on the right
B3	Platform 1	Blue towards Lak Song (Huai Khwang)
