= Ratchadaphisek MRT station =

MRT station in Bangkok

Coordinates: 13.7991°N 100.5750°E

สถานีรัชดาภิเษก Ratchadaphisek
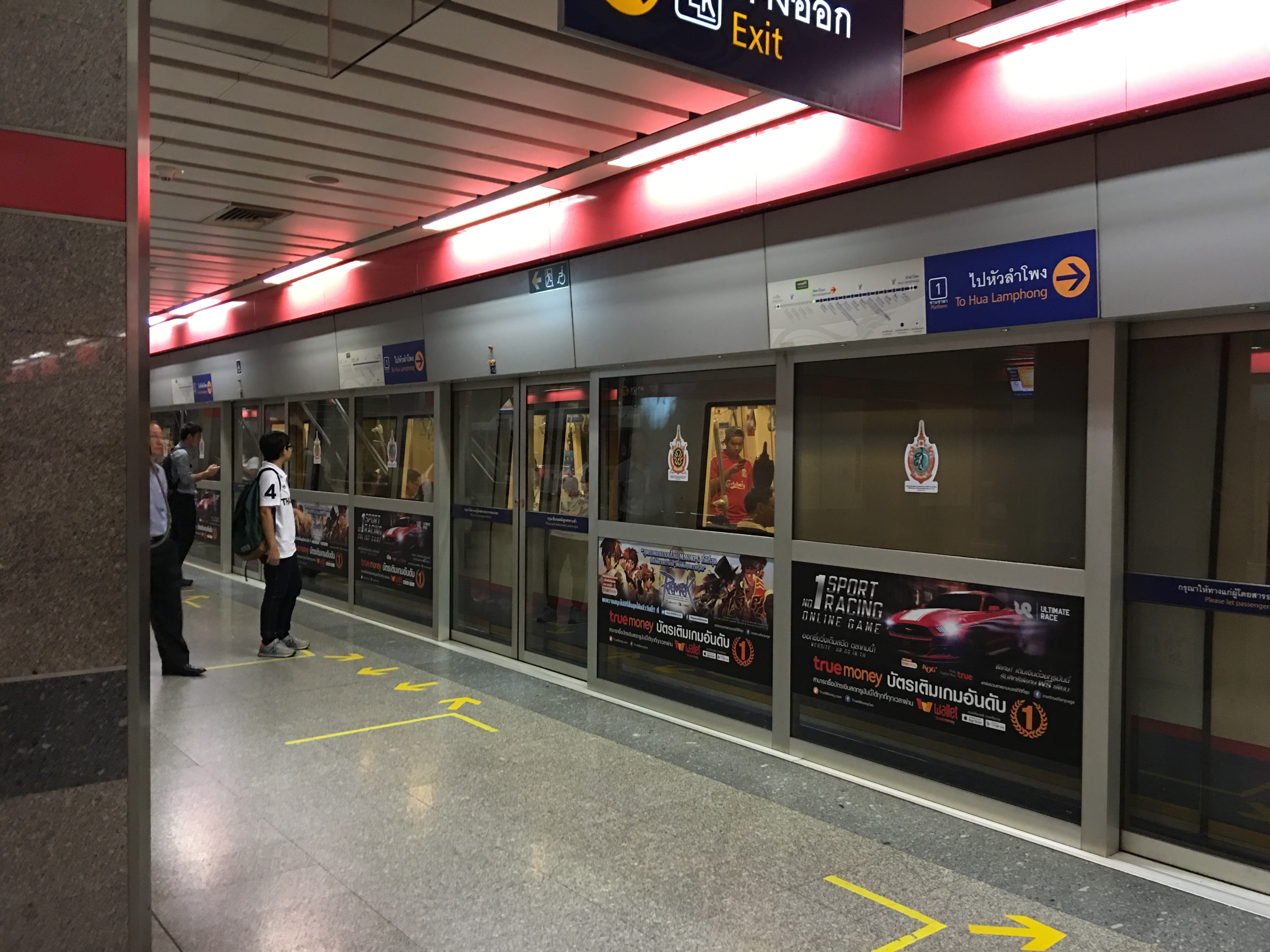

General information
- Location: Din Daeng and Huai Khwang, Bangkok, Thailand
- System: MRT
- Owner: Mass Rapid Transit Authority of Thailand (MRTA)
- Operator: Bangkok Expressway and Metro Public Company Limited (BEM)
- Line: Blue Line
- Platforms: 1 island platform
- Tracks: 2

Construction
- Structure type: Underground
- Accessible: yes

Other information
- Station code: BL16

History
- Opened: 3 July 2004; 22 years ago
- Former names: Ratchada

Passengers
- 2021: 1,571,151

Services
Preceding station	Metropolitan Rapid Transit	Following station
Sutthisan towards Lak Song	Blue Line	Lat Phrao towards Tha Phra via Bang Sue
Location

Ratchadaphisek station (Thai: สถานีรัชดาภิเษก) is a Bangkok MRT station on the Blue Line, located under Ratchadaphisek Road, in Bangkok, Thailand.

During construction, the station had been named Ratchada but MRTA changed to Ratchadaphisek, reflecting the road of the same name. The station's symbol color is pink.

== Station layout ==
G	-	Bus stop
B1	Basement	Exits 1–3
B2	Concourse	Ticket machines
B3	Platform 2	Blue towards Tha Phra via Bang Sue (Lat Phrao)
B3	Island platform, doors will open on the right
B3	Platform 1	Blue towards Lak Song (Sutthisan)
