= Bang Pho MRT station =

Railway station in Bangkok, Thailand

บางโพ Bang Pho
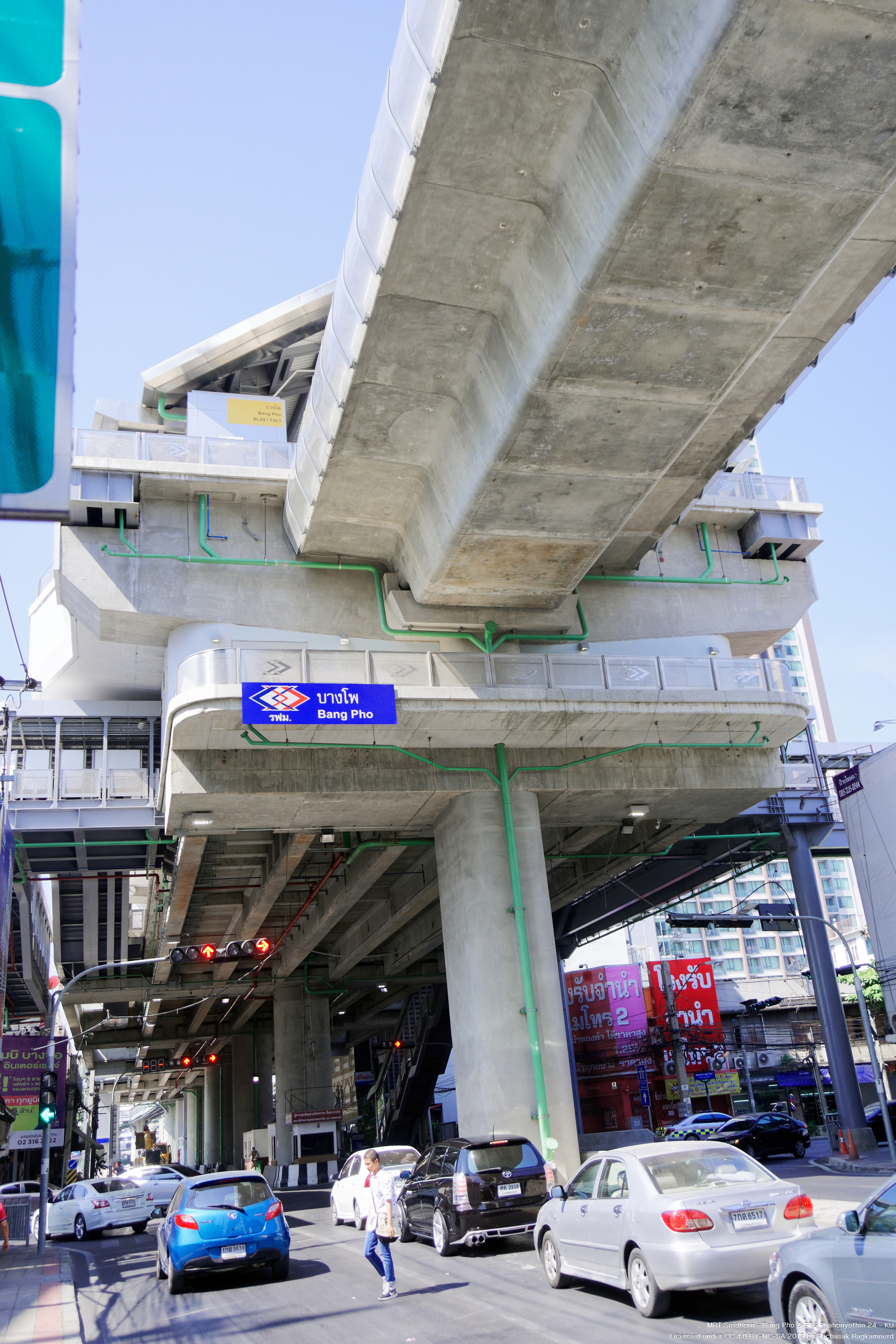

General information
- Location: Bang Sue, Bangkok, Thailand
- Coordinates: 13.8064°N 100.5209°E
- System: MRT
- Owner: Mass Rapid Transit Authority of Thailand (MRTA)
- Operator: Bangkok Expressway and Metro Public Company Limited (BEM)
- Line: MRT (MRT Blue line)
- Platforms: 2 side platforms
- Tracks: 2
- Connections: Chao Phraya Express Boat services

Construction
- Structure type: Elevated
- Parking: No

Other information
- Station code: BL09

History
- Opened: 4 December 2019; 6 years ago

Passengers
- 2021: 914,603

Services
Preceding station	Metropolitan Rapid Transit	Following station
Tao Poon towards Lak Song	Blue Line	Bang O towards Tha Phra
Location

Bang Pho station (Thai: สถานีบางโพ), is an elevated railway station on MRT Blue Line. The station opened on 4 December 2019. This is one of the nine stations of phase 3 of MRT Blue Line. It has a connection to the Chao Phraya Express Boat at Bang Pho Pier.
