= Charan 13 MRT station =

Metro station in Bangkok, Thailand

Coordinates: 13.740196°N 100.470682°E

จรัญฯ 13 Charan 13
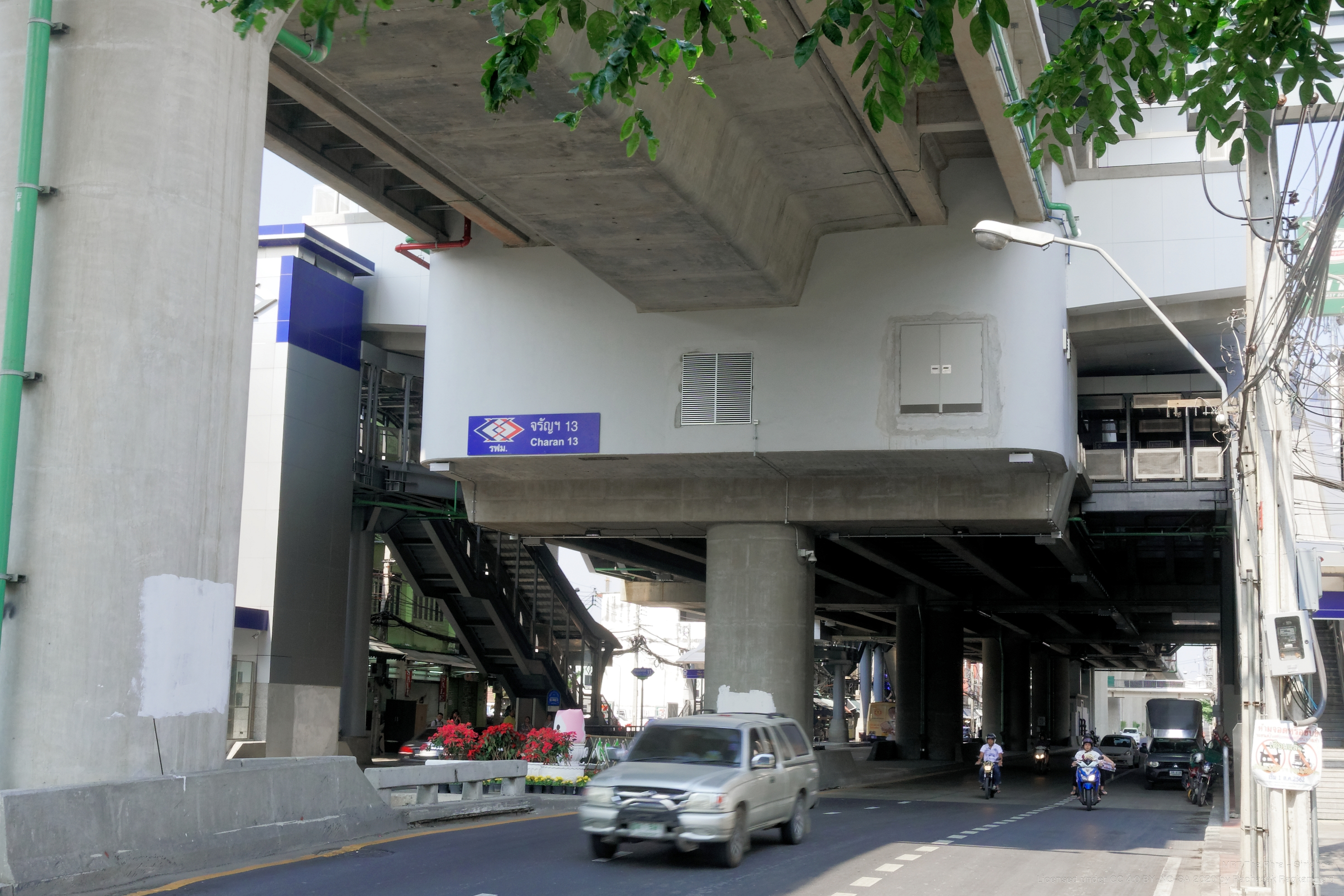

General information
- Location: Wat Tha Phra, Bangkok Yai, Bangkok, Thailand
- System: MRT
- Owner: Mass Rapid Transit Authority of Thailand (MRTA)
- Operator: Bangkok Expressway and Metro Public Company Limited (BEM)
- Line: MRT (MRT Blue line)
- Platforms: 2 side platforms
- Tracks: 2

Construction
- Structure type: Elevated
- Parking: No

Other information
- Station code: BL02

History
- Opened: 23 December 2019; 6 years ago

Passengers
- 2021: 798,477

Services
Preceding station	Metropolitan Rapid Transit	Following station
Fai Chai towards Lak Song	Blue Line	Tha Phra Terminus
Location

Charan 13 station (Thai: สถานีจรัญฯ 13, RTGS: Sathani Charan Sip Sam, pronounced [sā.tʰǎː.nīː t͡ɕā.rān sìp sǎːm]), is an elevated railway station on MRT Blue Line, in Bangkok, Thailand. The station opened on 23 December 2019. The station is one of the nine stations of phase 3 of MRT Blue Line.

The station is located above Charan Sanitwong Road at Phanitchayakan Thon Buri Junction, also known as Soi Charan 13 or Soi Phanit Thon, where Charan Sanitwong Road meets Soi Charan 13. This is a large, narrow alley and the location of Thonburi Commercial College, as well as several temples, with shortcuts to Ratchapruek, Bang Waek, and Phet Kasem Roads in the Phasi Charoen area.

== Nearby places ==
Bangkok Yai area

- Siam Technology College
- Wat Duduat

Phasi Charoen area

- Wat Paknam Fang Tai
- Bang Sao Thong Police Station
- Wat Wichitkarnnimit (Wat Nang)
- Thonburi Commercial College

Taling Chan area

- Wat Paknam Fang Nuea
