= Bang Phlat MRT station =

Rapid transit station in Bangkok, Thailand

บางพลัด Bang Phlat
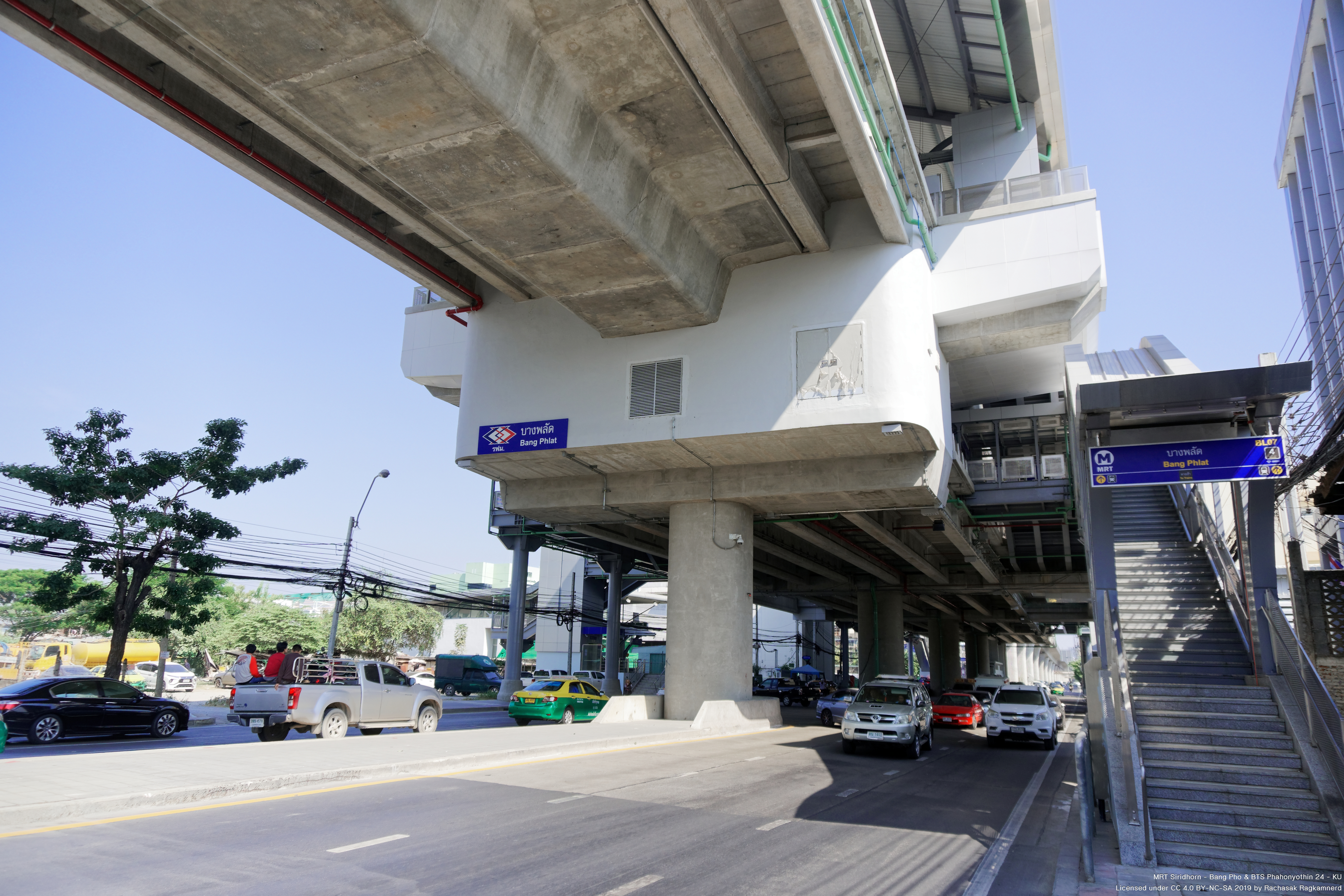

General information
- Location: Bang Phlat, Bangkok, Thailand
- Coordinates: 13.7925°N 100.5049°E
- System: MRT
- Owner: Mass Rapid Transit Authority of Thailand (MRTA)
- Operator: Bangkok Expressway and Metro Public Company Limited (BEM)
- Line: MRT (MRT Blue line)
- Platforms: 2 side platforms
- Tracks: 2

Construction
- Structure type: Elevated
- Parking: No

Other information
- Station code: BL07

History
- Opened: 4 December 2019; 6 years ago

Passengers
- 2021: 485,490

Services
Preceding station	Metropolitan Rapid Transit	Following station
Bang O towards Lak Song	Blue Line	Sirindhorn towards Tha Phra
Location

Bang Phlat station (Thai: สถานีบางพลัด, pronounced [sā.tʰǎː.nīː bāːŋ pʰlát]), is an elevated railway station on MRT Blue Line in Bangkok, in Thailand. The station opened on 4 December 2019. The station is one of the nine stations of phase 3 of MRT Blue Line.

As of 2021, it was the least used station on the MRT Blue Line.
