= Patpong Night Market =

Night market in Bangkok, Thailand

Coordinates: 13.72868°N 100.53183°E

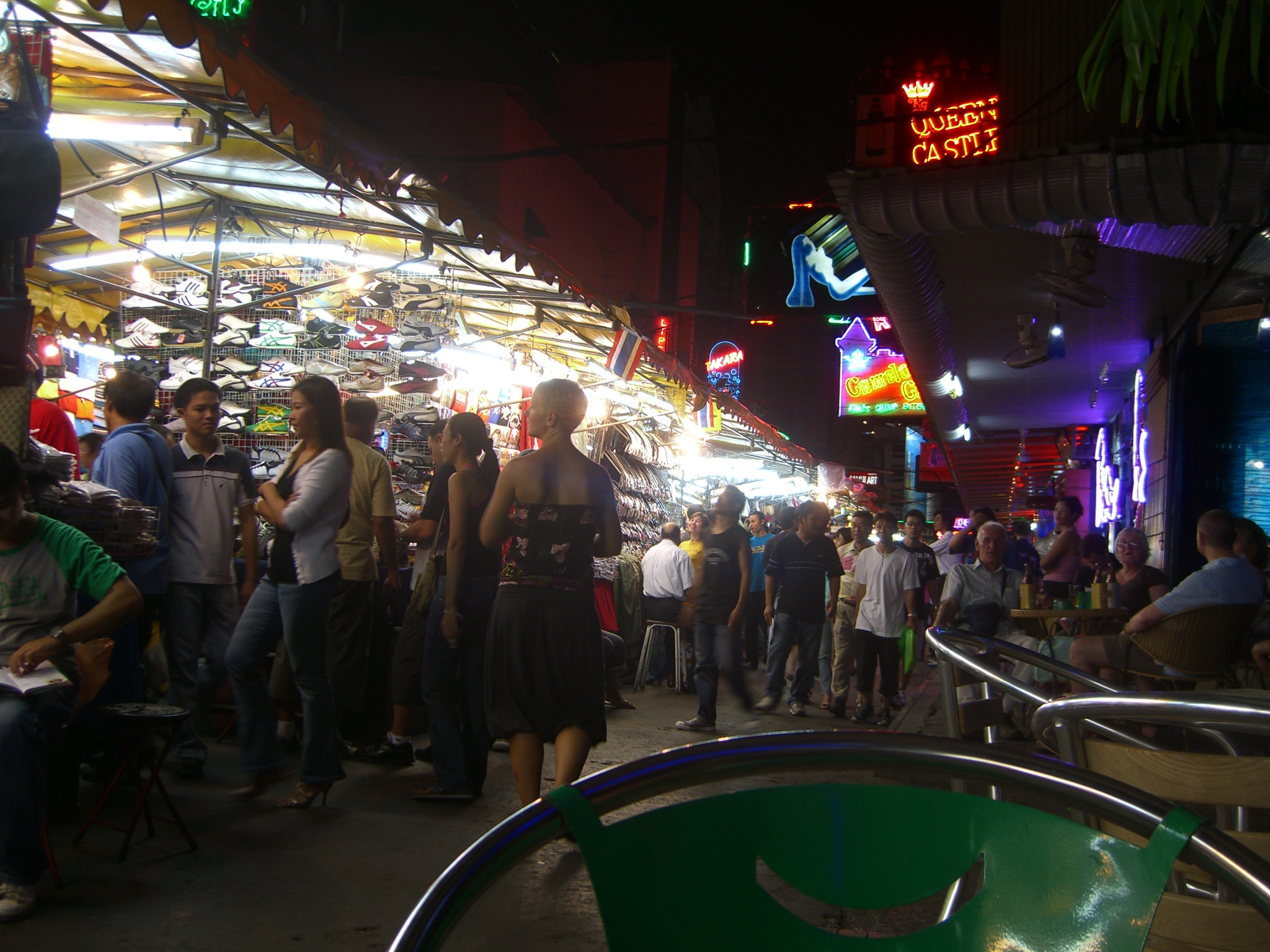
Patpong Night Market

Patpong Night Market is a night bazaar in well-known red-light district Patpong neighbourhood in downtown Bangkok.

Patpong is a popular entertainment district located in the namesake soi (alley) of Silom road. One of the most important commercial zones of Bangkok. During the day, it is full of office workers and street hawkers. When the night falls, the pavements on either side of the road are turned into a long stretch of shopping complex. Various goods ranging from fake brand name items to cheap clothes are souvenirs. Silom or Patpong's world-class reputation comes from numerous nightclubs and many other night entertainment venues as well as various street food stalls along the road.

Most of shops are open daily from 05:00 pm to 12:00 am. Can be accessed via both Silom and Surawong roads.
