= Fai Chai MRT station =

Metro station in Bangkok, Thailand

ไฟฉาย Fai Chai
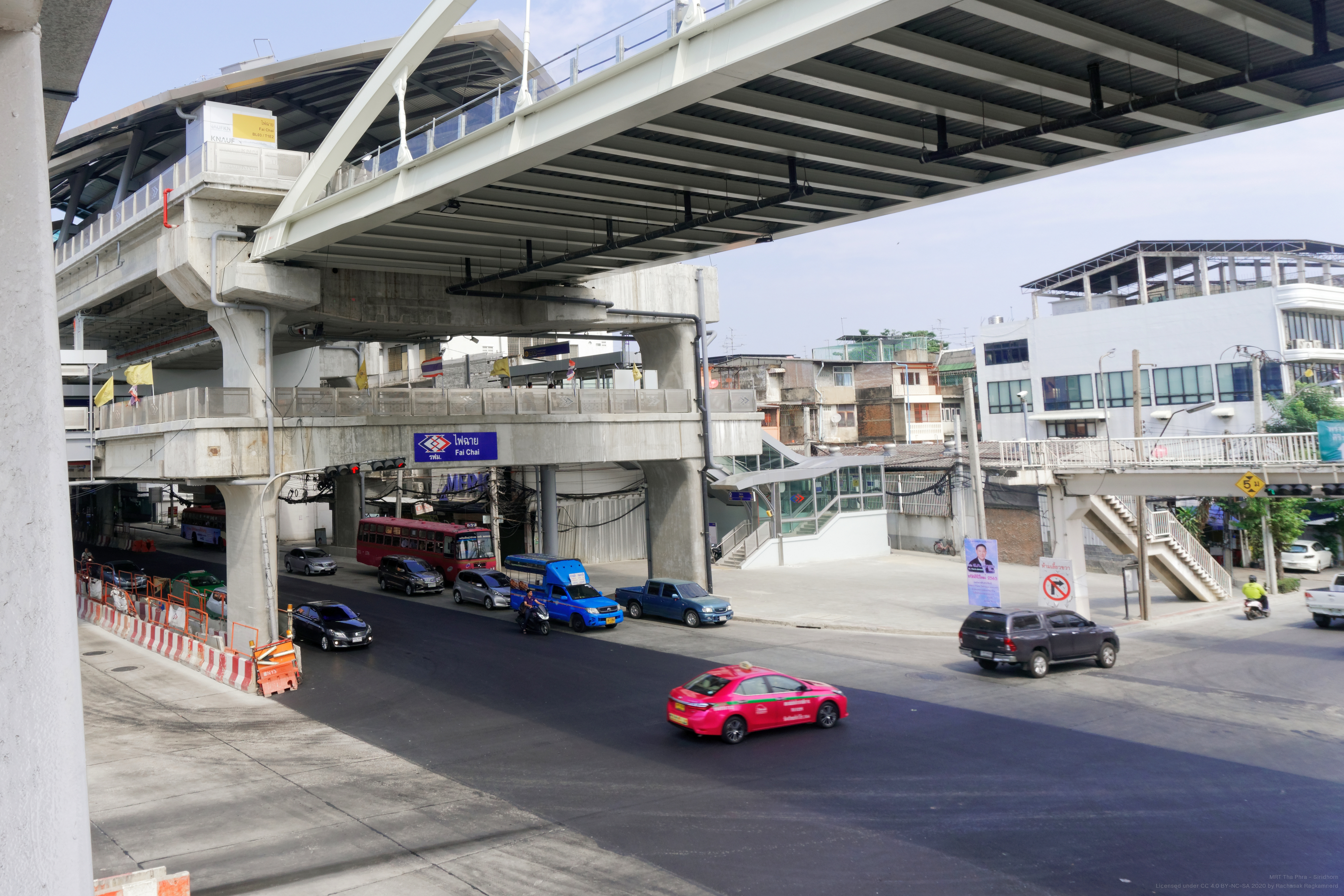

General information
- Location: Bangkok Noi, Bangkok, Thailand
- Coordinates: 13.7557°N 100.4693°E
- System: MRT
- Owner: Mass Rapid Transit Authority of Thailand (MRTA)
- Operator: Bangkok Expressway and Metro Public Company Limited (BEM)
- Line: MRT (MRT Blue line)
- Platforms: 2 side platforms
- Tracks: 2

Construction
- Structure type: Elevated
- Parking: No

Other information
- Station code: BL03

History
- Opened: 23 December 2019; 6 years ago

Passengers
- 2021: 736,059

Services
Preceding station	Metropolitan Rapid Transit	Following station
Bang Khun Non towards Lak Song	Blue Line	Charan 13 towards Tha Phra
Location

Fai Chai station (Thai: สถานีไฟฉาย), is an elevated railway station on MRT Blue Line in Bangkok, Thailand. The station opened on 23 December 2019. The station is one of the nine stations of phase 3 of MRT Blue Line. The railway line runs on a bowstring bridge above Fai Chai intersection, of which the station is named after.
