= Sirindhorn MRT station =

Railway station in Bangkok, Thailand

Coordinates: 13.783797°N 100.493356°E

สิรินธร Sirindhorn
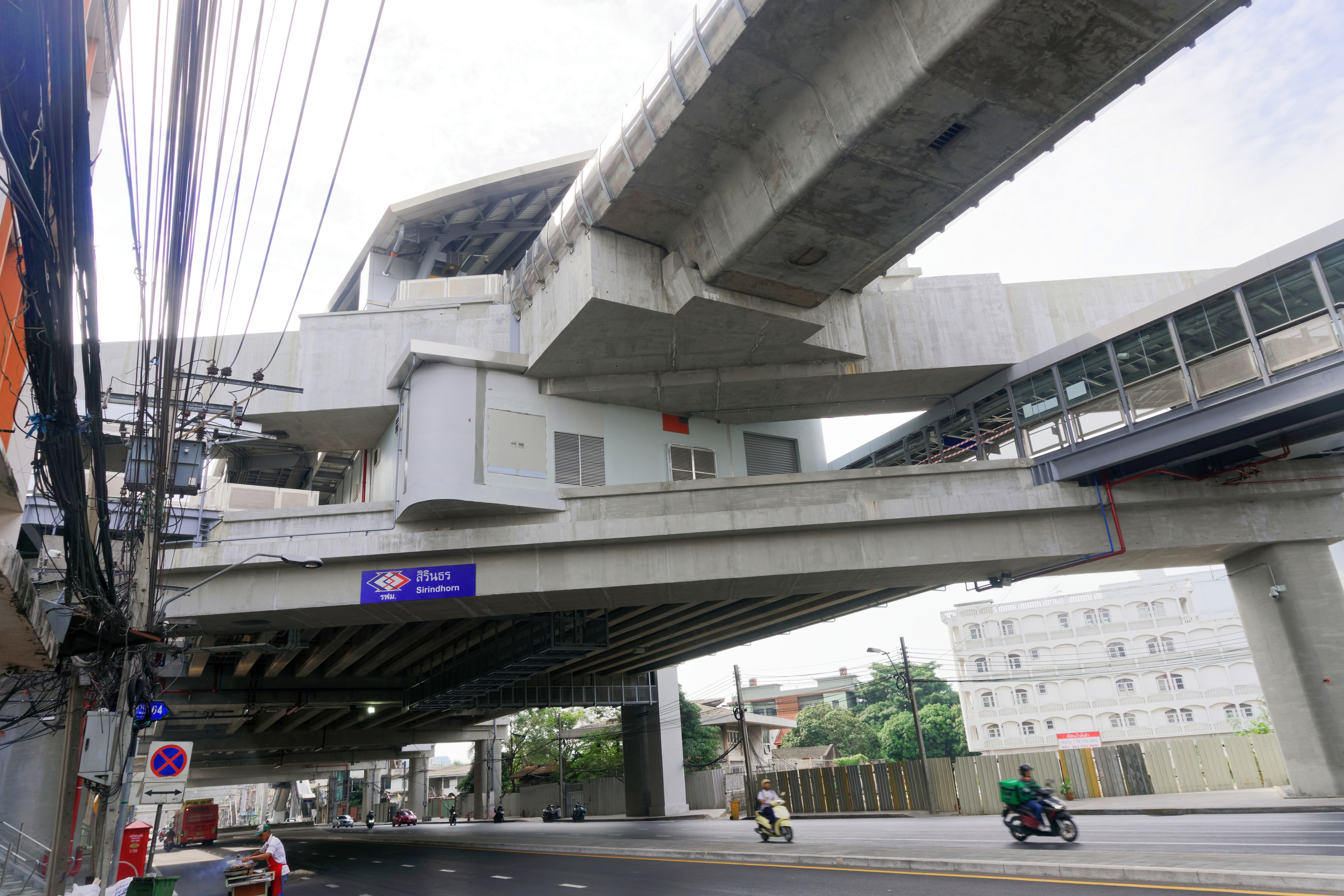
- Station under construction from Charan Sanitwong Road

General information
- Location: Bang Phlat, Bangkok, Thailand
- System: MRT
- Owner: Mass Rapid Transit Authority of Thailand (MRTA)
- Operator: Bangkok Expressway and Metro Public Company Limited (BEM)
- Line: MRT (MRT Blue line)
- Platforms: 2 side platforms
- Tracks: 2

Construction
- Structure type: Elevated
- Parking: No

Other information
- Station code: BL06

History
- Opened: 4 December 2019; 6 years ago

Passengers
- 2021: 840,157

Services
Preceding station	Metropolitan Rapid Transit	Following station
Bang Phlat towards Lak Song	Blue Line	Bang Yi Khan towards Tha Phra
Location

Sirindhorn station (Thai: สถานีสิรินธร, RTGS: Sathani Sirinthon) is an elevated railway station on the MRT Blue Line, serving the Bangkok Metropolitan Region in Thailand. This station opened on 4 December 2019.

The station is named after Sirindhorn Road (named after Princess Sirindhorn), which is one of the three roads (the others being Charan Sanit Wong Road and Ratchawithi Road) that intersect at the Bang Phlat intersection. Said intersection is the western terminus of the Krung Thon Bridge and located close to this MRT station.
