= Bang O MRT station =

Railway station in Bangkok, Thailand

บางอ้อ Bang O
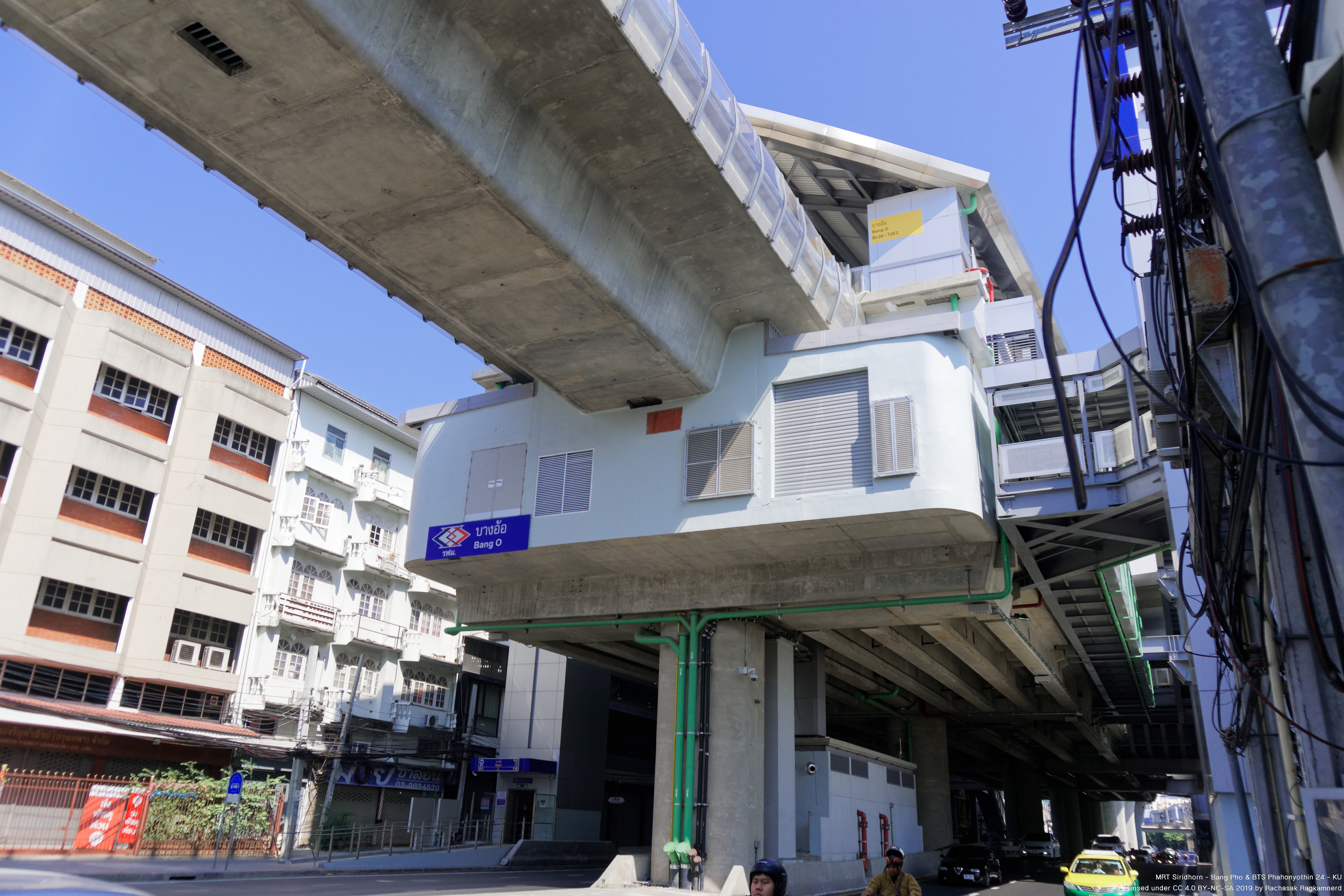

General information
- Location: Bang Phlat, Bangkok, Thailand
- Coordinates: 13.7989°N 100.5097°E
- System: MRT
- Owner: Mass Rapid Transit Authority of Thailand (MRTA)
- Operator: Bangkok Expressway and Metro Public Company Limited (BEM)
- Line: MRT (MRT Blue line)
- Platforms: 2 side platforms
- Tracks: 2

Construction
- Structure type: Elevated
- Parking: No

Other information
- Station code: BL08

History
- Opened: 4 December 2019; 6 years ago

Passengers
- 2021: 861,738

Services
Preceding station	Metropolitan Rapid Transit	Following station
Bang Pho towards Lak Song	Blue Line	Bang Phlat towards Tha Phra
Location

Bang O station (Thai: สถานีบางอ้อ, pronounced [sā.tʰǎː.nīː bāːŋ ʔɔ̂ː]), is an elevated railway station on MRT Blue Line. The station opened on 4 December 2019. The station is one of the nine stations of phase 3 of MRT Blue Line. It is named after the Bang O subdistrict.
