= Bang Yi Khan MRT station =

Railway station in Bangkok, Thailand

Coordinates: 13.777305°N 100.485226°E

บางยี่ขัน Bang Yi Khan
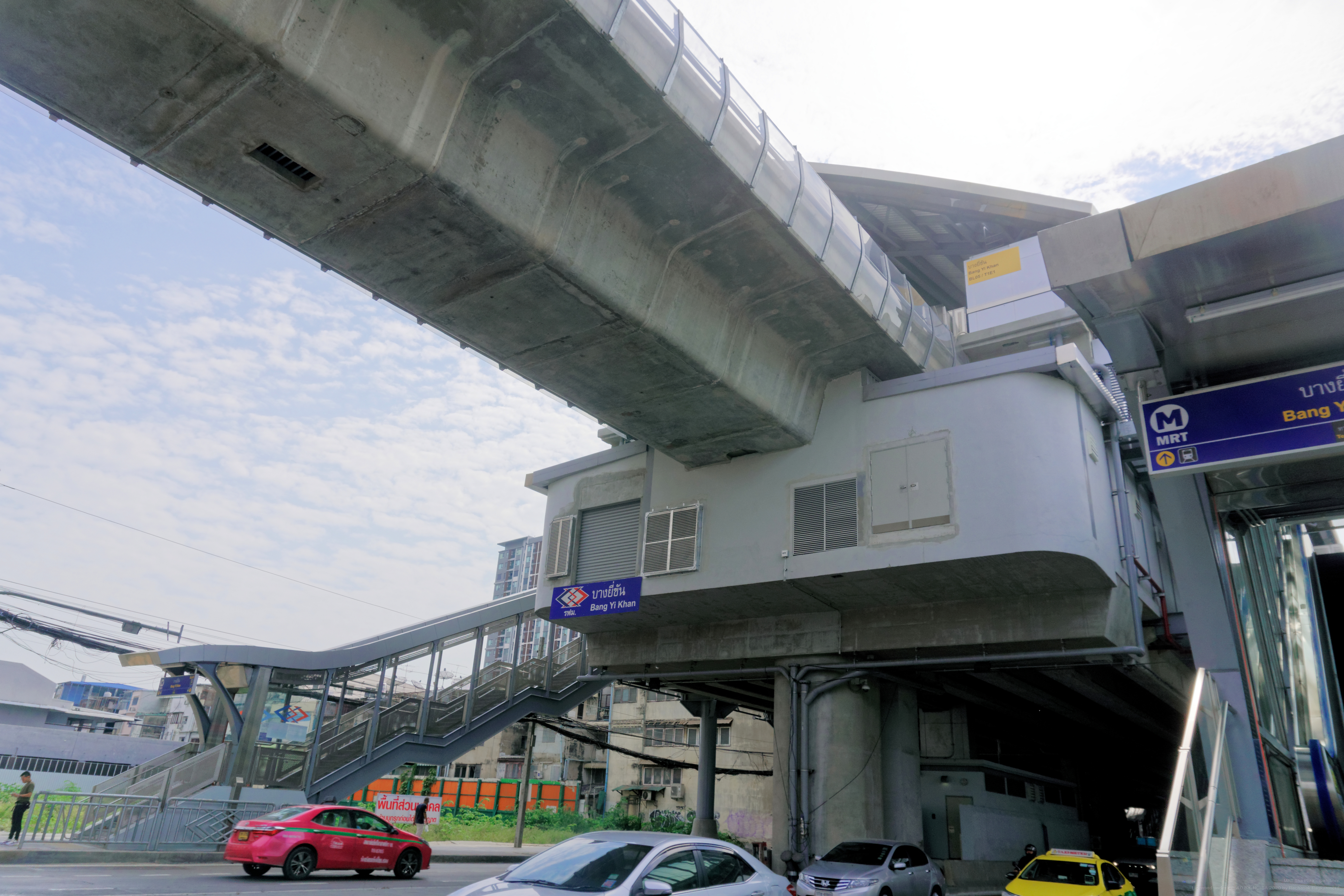

General information
- Location: Bang Phlat, Bangkok, Thailand
- Owner: Mass Rapid Transit Authority of Thailand (MRTA)
- Operator: Bangkok Expressway and Metro Public Company Limited (BEM)
- Line: MRT (MRT Blue line)
- Platforms: 2 side platforms
- Tracks: 2

Construction
- Structure type: Elevated
- Parking: No

Other information
- Station code: BL05

History
- Opened: 23 December 2019; 6 years ago

Passengers
- 2021: 1,401,294

Services
Preceding station	Metropolitan Rapid Transit	Following station
Sirindhorn towards Lak Song	Blue Line	Bang Khun Non towards Tha Phra
Location

Bang Yi Khan station (Thai: สถานีบางยี่ขัน, pronounced [sā.tʰǎː.nīː bāːŋ jîː kʰǎn]) is an elevated railway station on MRT Blue Line that serves the Bangkok Metropolitan Region in Thailand. The station opened on 23 December 2019. The station is one of the nine stations of phase 3 of MRT Blue Line.
