= Makkasan station (Airport Rail Link) =

Metro station in Bangkok, Thailand

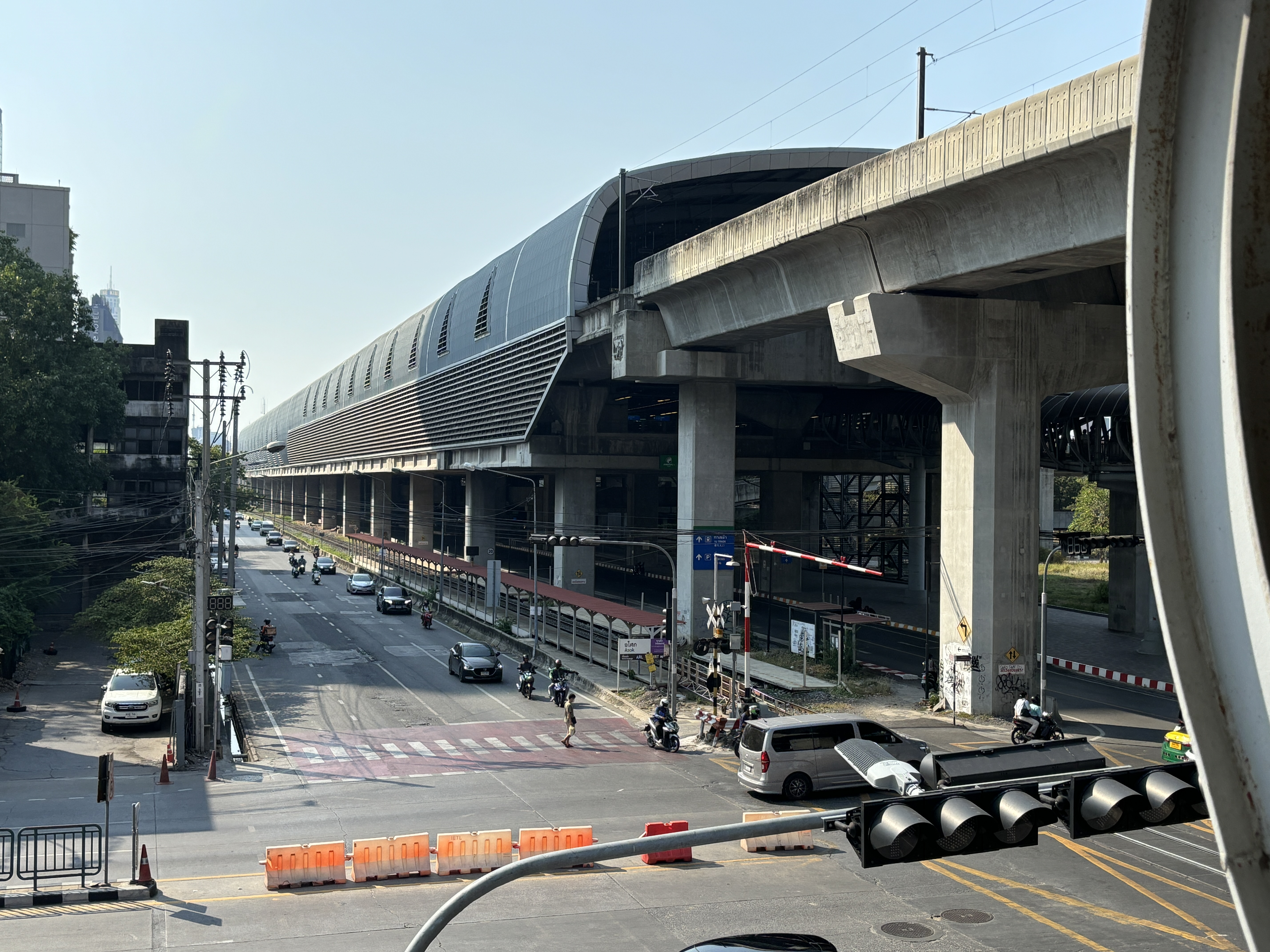
- Station building of ARL Makkasan station, with the SRT Asoke Halt on the ground level.

General information
- Location: Ratchathewi, Bangkok, Thailand
- Coordinates: 13.7510°N 100.5613°E
- System: ARL
- Owner: State Railway of Thailand
- Operator: State Railway of Thailand (SRT); Asia Era One Company Limited (AERA1) (ARL)
- Platforms: 4 (Split platform)
- Tracks: 4
- Connections: Blue Line (Phetchaburi MRT station)

Construction
- Structure type: Elevated

Other information
- Station code: CAT

History
- Opened: 23 August 2010; 16 years ago
- Former names: City Air Terminal

Services
Preceding station	Airport Rail Link	Following station
Ratchaprarop towards Phaya Thai	City Line	Ramkhamhaeng towards Suvarnabhumi
Preceding station	State Railway of Thailand	Following station
Makkasan towards Hua Lamphong	Eastern Line transfer at Asok Halt	Khlong Tan towards Chuk Samet or Poipet (Cambodia)
Preceding station	Metropolitan Rapid Transit	Following station
Sukhumvit towards Lak Song	Blue Line transfer at Phetchaburi	Phra Ram 9 towards Tha Phra
Proposed
Preceding station	Airport Rail Link	Following station
Krung Thep Aphiwat towards Don Mueang	High-Speed Rail Linking Three Airports	Suvarnabhumi towards U-Tapao
Location

Makkasan station (Thai: สถานีมักกะสัน) is a rapid transit station on the Airport Rail Link. The station was opened in August 2010. It was the terminal station for the Airport Rail Link Express Line, which was suspended in September 2014 due to a shortage of rolling stock. Currently, the station is a stop on the Airport Rail Link City Line. Until September 2014, Thai Airways' City Air Terminal check-in facilities were located inside the station.

The station has a skywalk, accessible by escalators and elevator, connecting it to Phetchaburi MRT station, on the MRT Blue Line.

== Former City Air Terminal ==
Makkasan is the largest station on the Airport Rail Link connecting Suvarnabhumi Airport with downtown Bangkok. It was envisioned as a city air terminal where passengers could check into outgoing flights and connect to the public transportation network in Bangkok. In reality, the terminal was rarely used due to its inconvenient location and lack of connections to other public transportation. Access to the terminal was via one crowded road and when leaving the terminal, traffic must go in a direction that makes getting to the popular Sukhumvit and Silom areas time-consuming and inconvenient.

== State Railway of Thailand ==
Underneath the railway station at ground level and located at the level crossing is Asok railway halt, operated by the State Railway of Thailand (SRT). It serves intercity services on the Eastern Line.

The ARL station shares the same name as Makkasan railway station of the SRT Eastern Line, but is at a different location to the west of the ARL station. The SRT station shares the same name with the Asok BTS station on the Sukhumvit Line, but it is at a different location to the south of the station, and takes 1 stop on the Blue Line.

== Layout ==
U4; Platforms
U4; Platforms	Platform 1	City Line	towards Suvarnabhumi
U4; Platforms	Platform 2, Split platform, Express/HST Line, Doors open at left side.		Platform 1, Split platform, City Line, Doors open at right side.
U4; Platforms	Platform 2	Express/HST Line	towards Suvarnabhumi
U4; Platforms	Platform 3	Express/HST Line	Terminus
U4; Platforms	Platform 3, Split platform, Express/HST Line, Doors open at left side.		Platform 4, Split platform, City Line, Doors open at right side.
U4; Platforms	Platform 4	City Line	towards Phaya Thai
U3; Departure	Ticket zone	Tourist information office Entrance to Express/HST Line and City Line platforms Sky Walk connects Phetchaburi MRT station, MRT .
U2; Arrival	–	Exit
G At grade	–	Drop-Off, Parking lot, Asok railway halt
B Underground	–	Parking lot

== Gallery ==
Makkasan Station
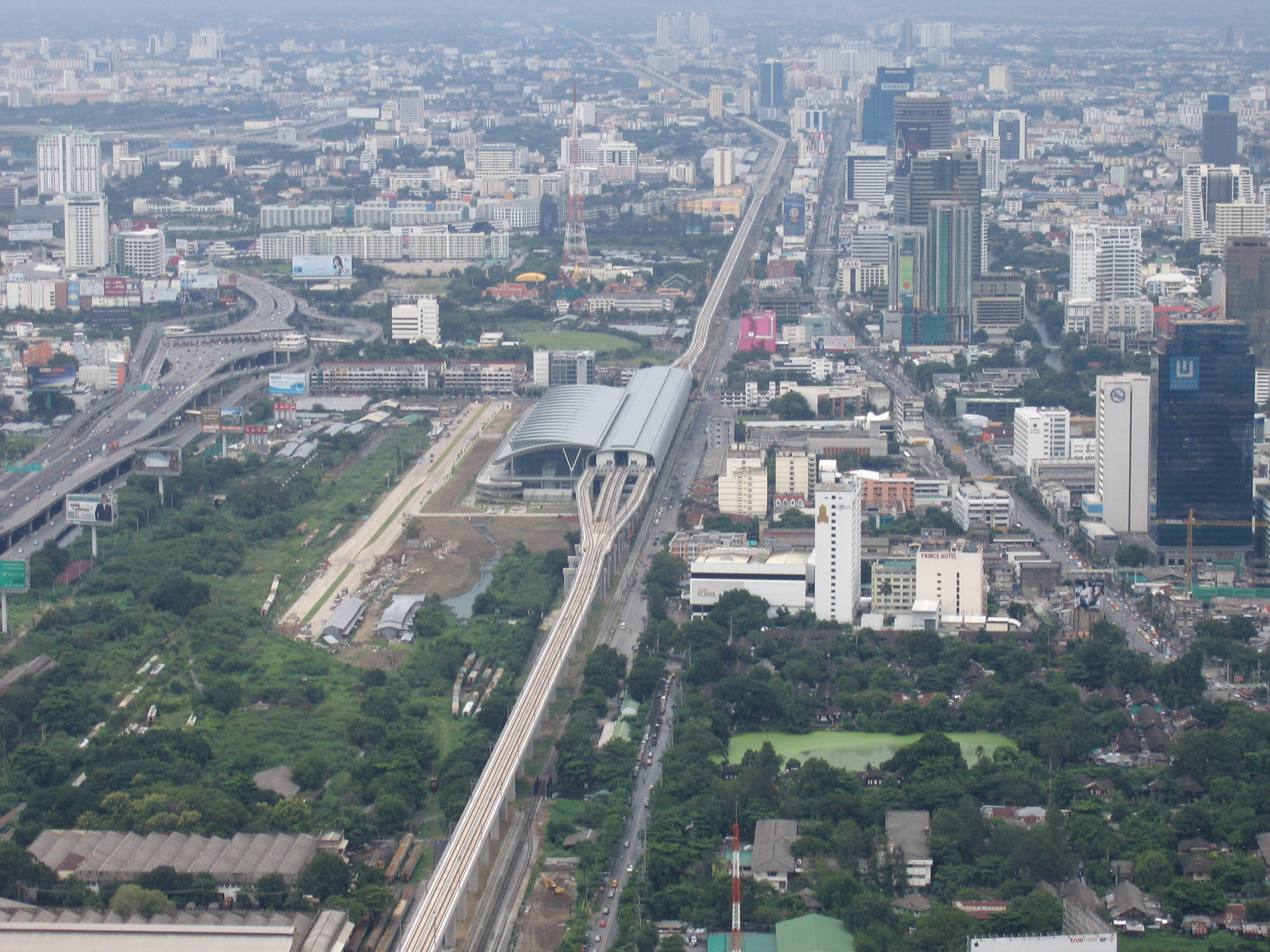
Aerial view

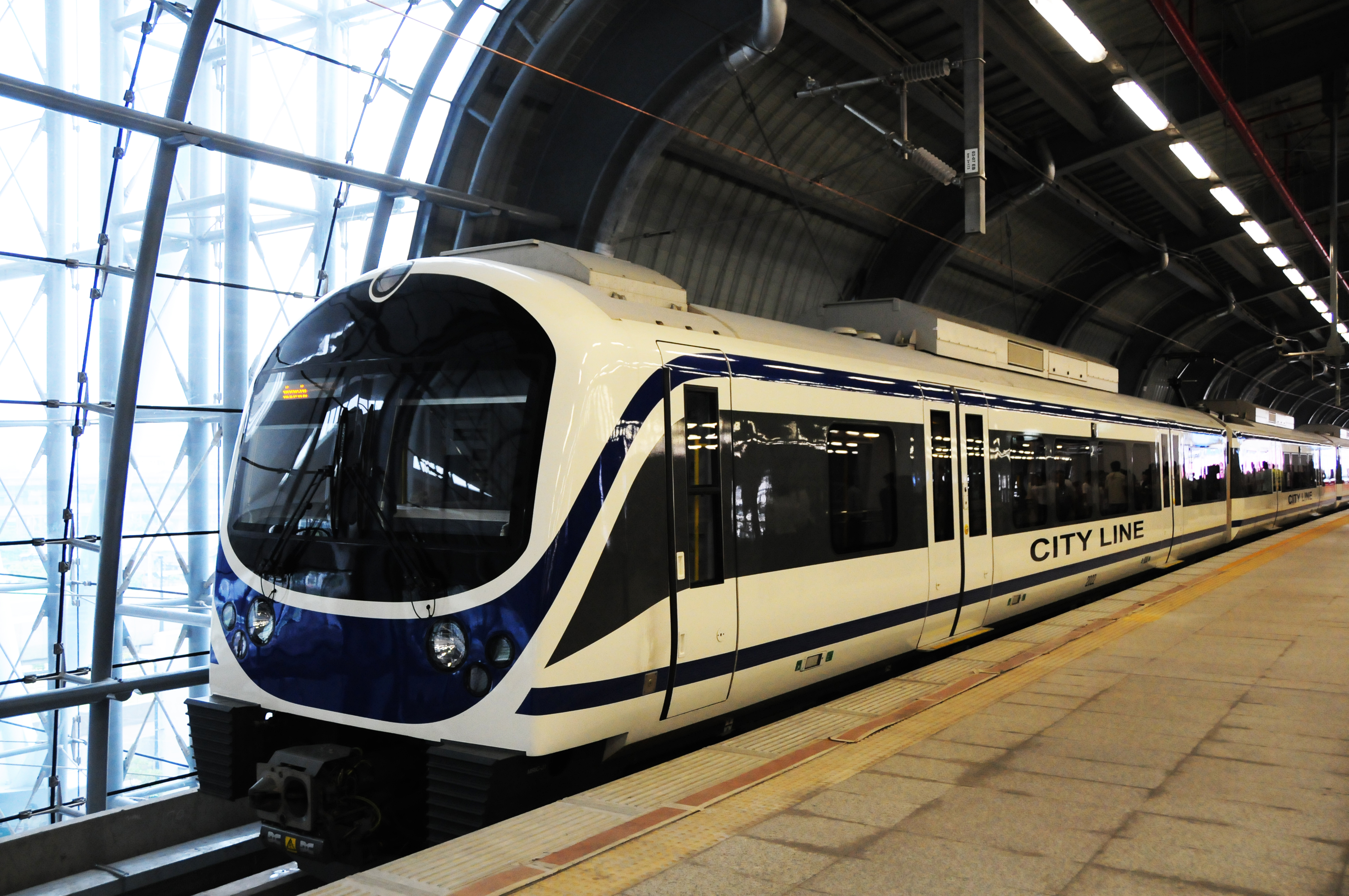
Platform 1

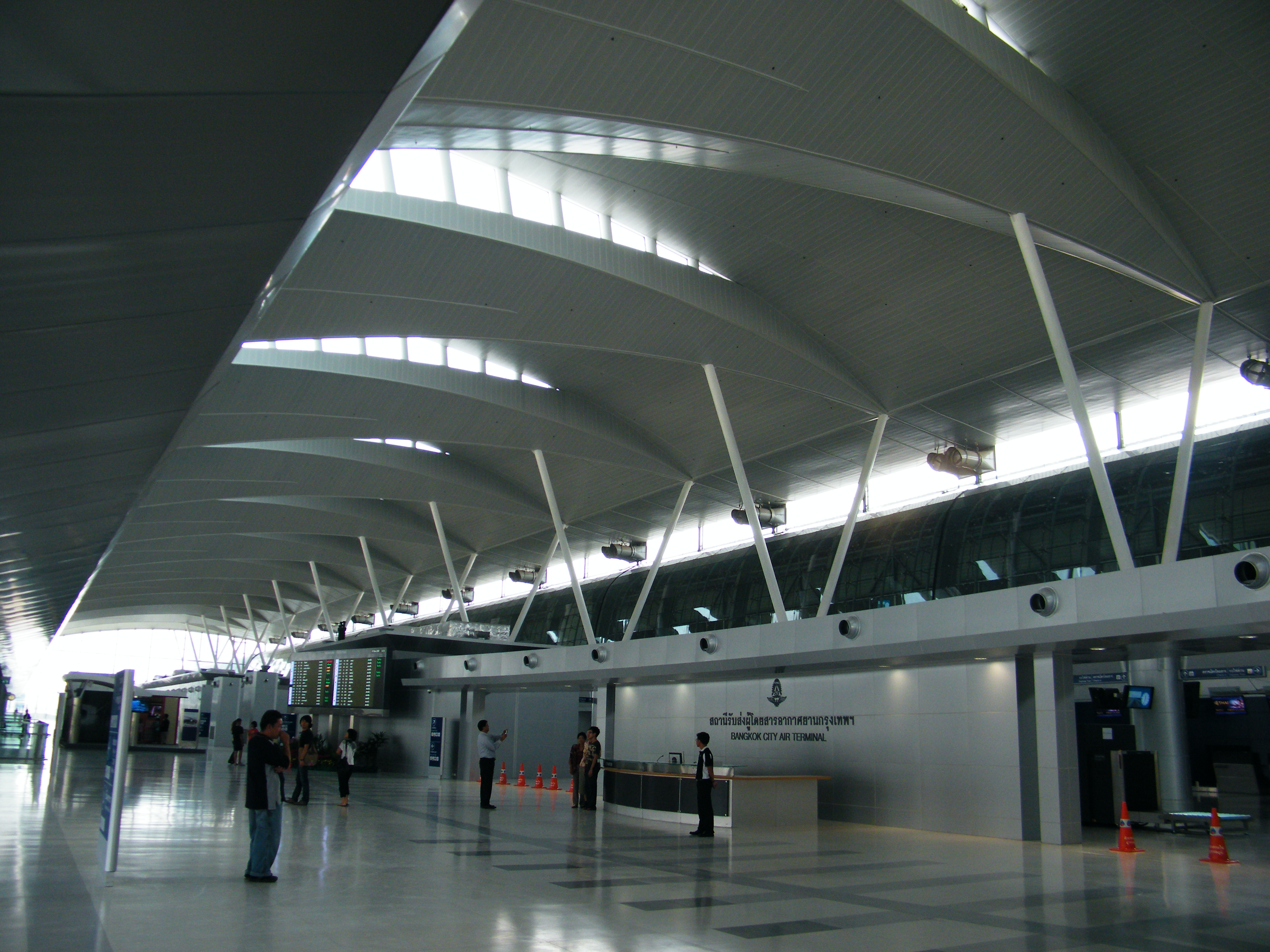
Interior of former City Air Terminal

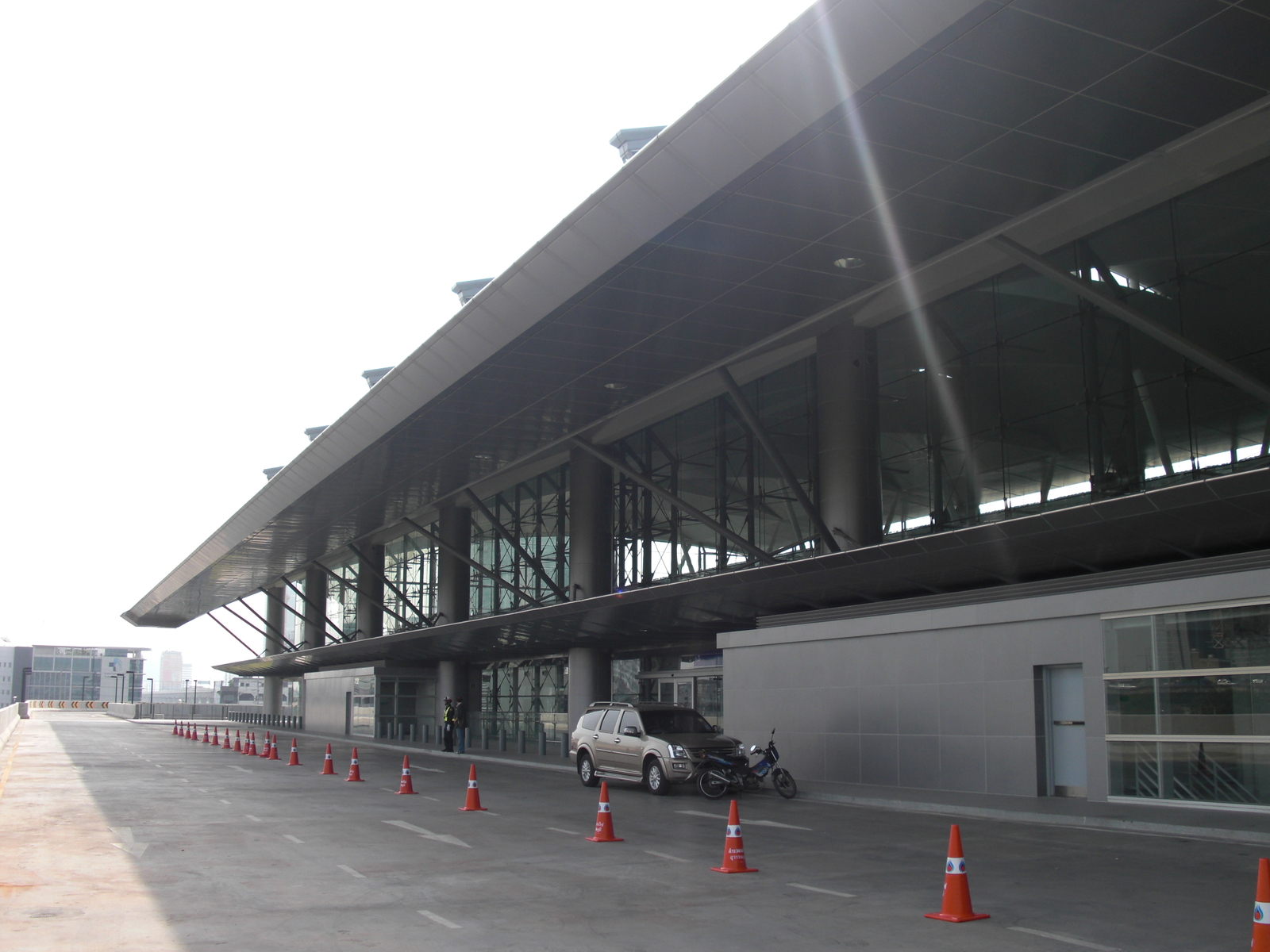
Exterior
Asok Railway Halt
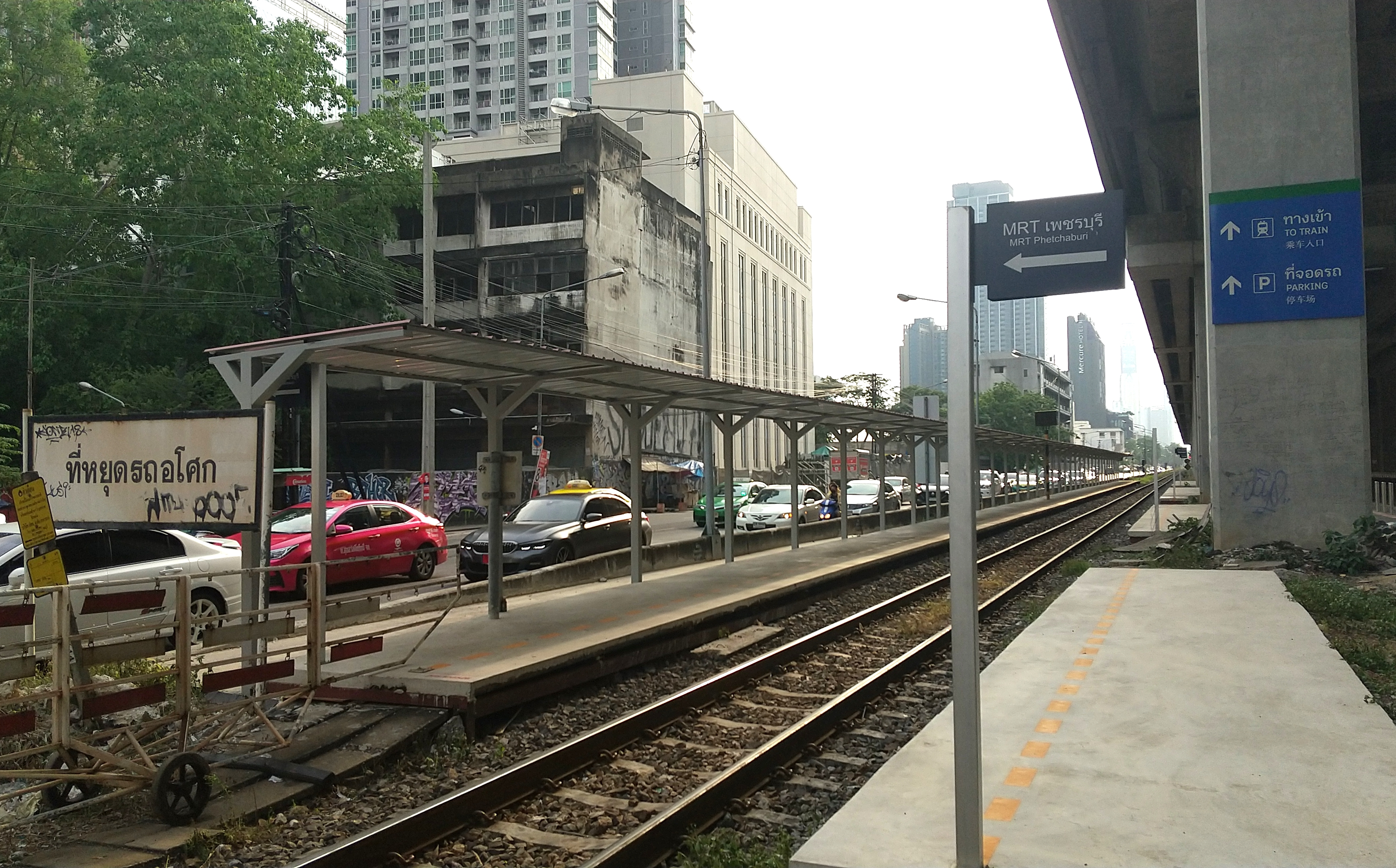
Platforms viewed westwards with sign

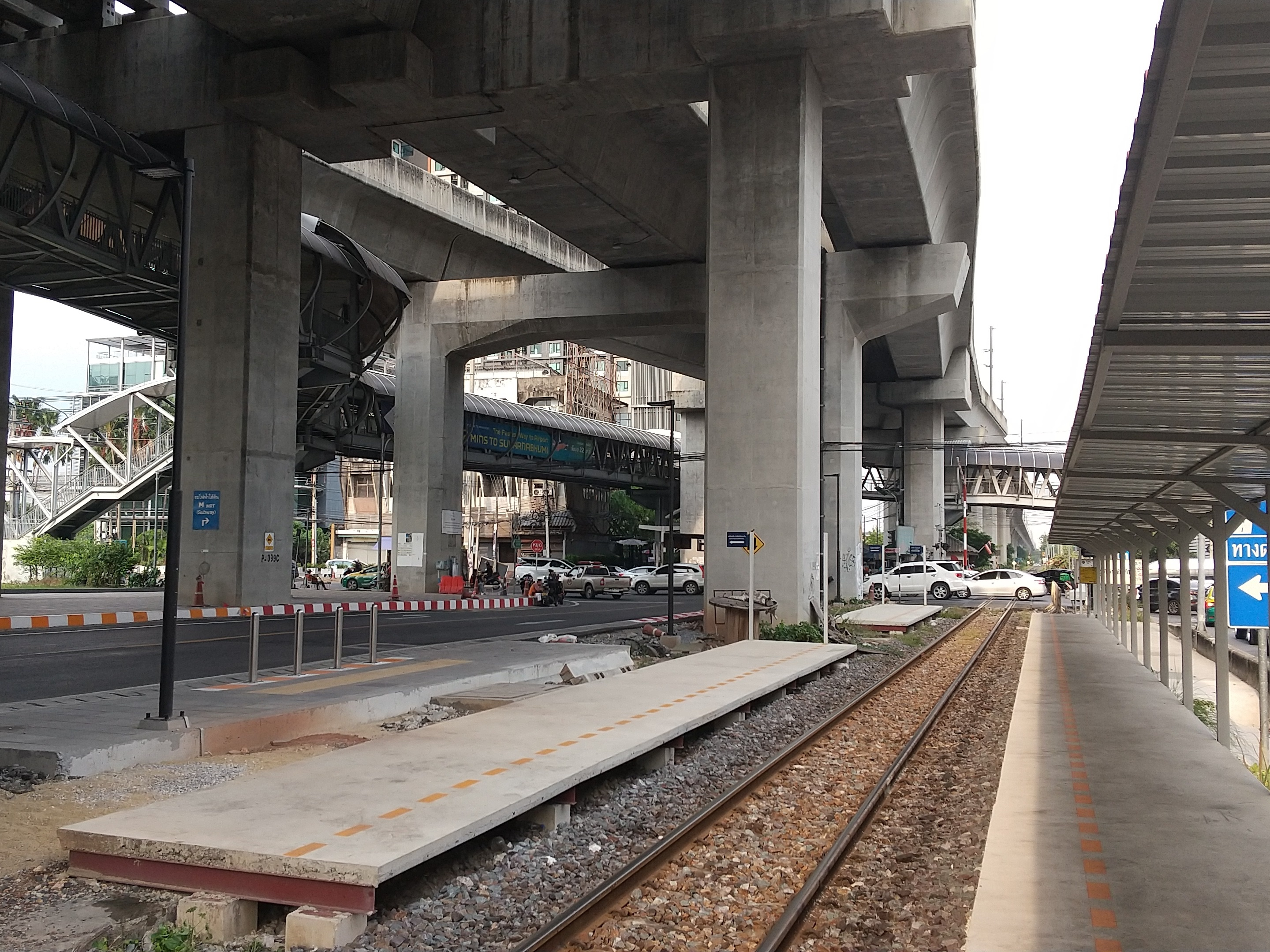
Platforms viewed eastwards

== See also ==
- Makkasan railway station
