= Huai Khwang subdistrict =

Huai Khwang ห้วยขวาง
- Khwaeng
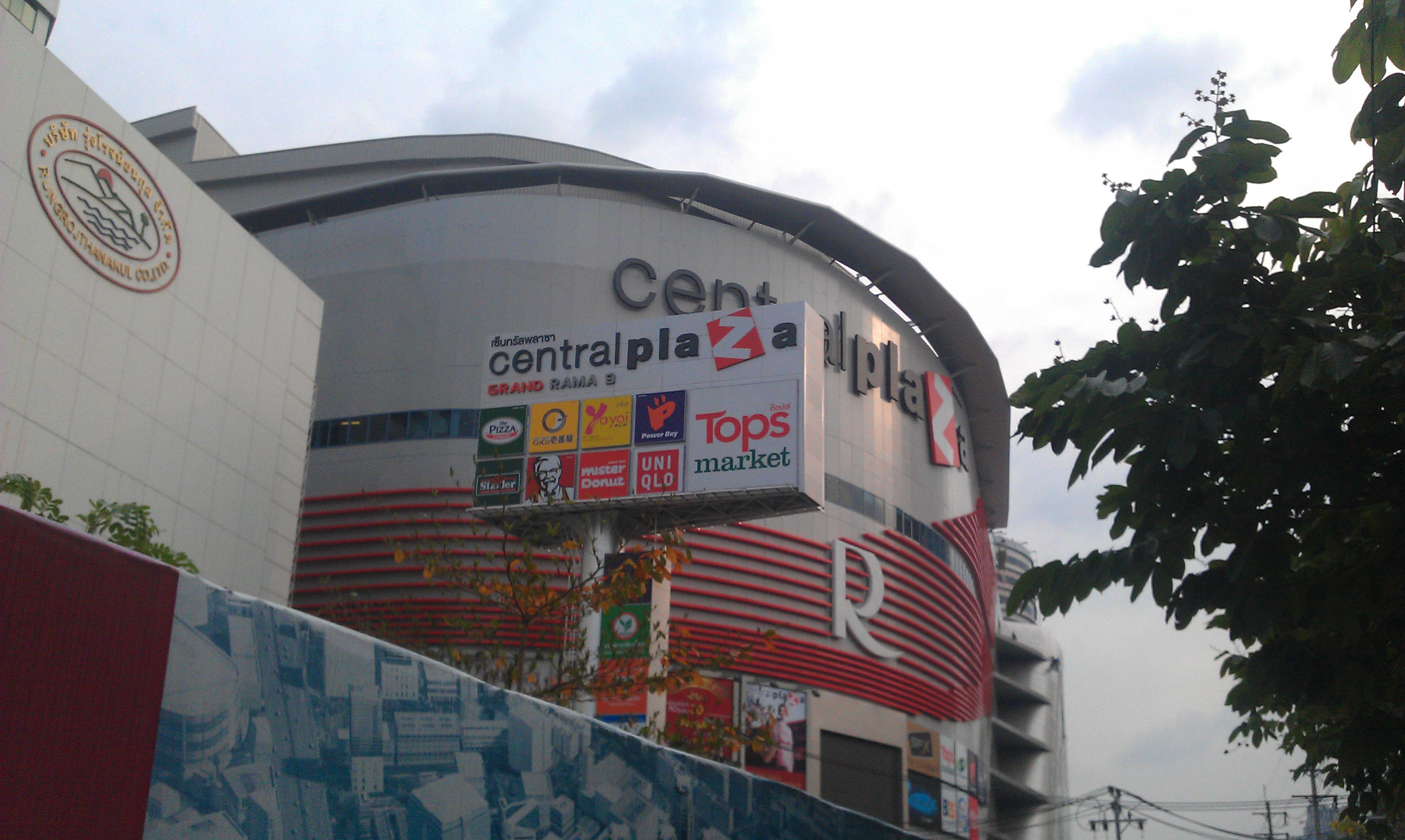
- Central Rama 9 shopping mall
- Etymology: Impeded Creek
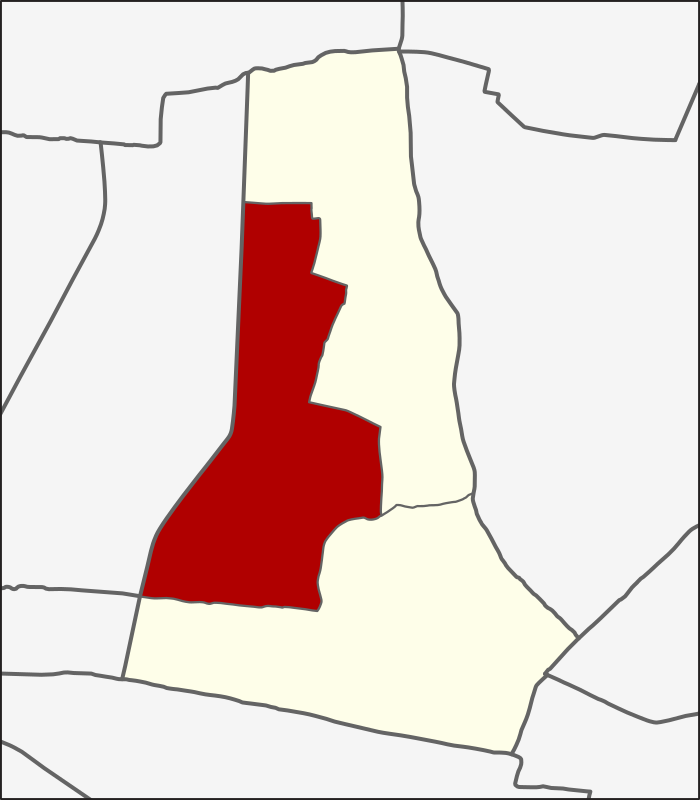
- Location in Huai Khwang district
- Country: Thailand
- Province: Bangkok
- Khet: Huai Khwang

Area
  - Total: 5.342 km^{2} (2.063 sq mi)

Population (2022)
  - Total: 27,109
  - Density: 5,074.69/km^{2} (13,143.4/sq mi)
- Time zone: UTC+7 (ICT)
- Postal code: 10310
- TIS 1099: 101701

Huai Khwang (Thai: ห้วยขวาง, pronounced [hûa̯j kʰwǎːŋ]) is a khwaeng (subdistrict) of Huai Khwang district, downtown Bangkok.

== History & naming ==
The subdistrict was once a tangle of marshlands in the past. Hence its name "Creeks That Block the Ways."

Nowadays, Huai Khwang is best known for its seedy nightlife and so-called massage parlours.

In addition, Pracha Rat Bamphen road, a branching off Ratchadaphisek road, is also the location of many shops or even nightclubs for Chinese. These Chinese are all new generation, some of them are even students. As a result, Huai Khwang has been dubbed as "New Chinatown".

== Geography ==
Huai Khwang is the west part of the district. Adjoining subdistricts are (from the north clockwise): Sam Sen Nok and Bang Kapi in its district, Din Daeng and Ratchadaphisek in Din Daeng district.
