= GMM25 =

Thai television channel

- Country: Thailand
- Broadcast area: Thailand; Malaysia (Perlis, Kedah, Perak, Kelantan and Terengganu); Myanmar (areas of Tachileik, Myawaddy, parts of Mawlamyine, and southernmost part of Tanintharyi Region); Cambodia (border areas of Oddar Meanchey, Banteay Meanchey, Pailin, parts of Battambang and Koh Kong provinces); Mekong river areas in Laos (including Vientiane)
- Headquarters: GMM Grammy Place, Asok Montri Rd., Watthana, Bangkok, Thailand

Programming
- Language: Thai
- Picture format: 720p HDTV

Ownership
- Owner: GMM Grammy (GMM25 Interactive Co., Ltd.)
- Sister channels: ONE31

History
- Launched: 25 May 2014; 12 years ago
- Former names: G-25 (pre-launch); BiG (2014); GMM Channel (2014–2016)

Links
- Website: www.gmm25.com

Availability

Terrestrial
- Digital terrestrial television: Channel 25 (TV5 MUX5)

GMM25 is a Thai digital terrestrial television channel. It is owned by GMM Grammy (via GMM Holding) and operated by The One Enterprise. The network offers drama, music, news and entertainment targeting teenagers.

It airs programs produced by GMMTV including teen, and Yaoi and Yuri (also known as "Boys' Love" and "Girls' Love", or simply "BL" and "GL") drama series daily evenings at 20:30 (8:30 pm), and weekend TV shows (mid-morning and late-night).

GMM25 was launched on 25 May 2014 after GMM Grammy was awarded with a digital TV license from the National Broadcasting and Telecommunications Committee in December 2013.

The network partnered with Viu and Line TV in providing re-runs.

The CEO is Takonkiet Viravan, who is also the managing director of The One Enterprise and ONE31.

== Presenters ==
- Orrarin Yamokgul
- Saranpat Tangpaisanthanakul
- Nitirath Buachan
- Yanin Yanachpaween
- Chainon Hankhirirat
- Navanan Bamrungphruk
- Somapol Piyapongsiri
- Pajaree Na Nakhon
- Krit Jenpanichkarn
- Anuwat Fuengthongdang
- Kanyarat Phimsawat
- Aniporn Chalermburanawong
- Chawankon Wattanaphisitkul
- Phat Chanapantarak
- Kachapha Tancharoen
- Worarit Fuengarom
- Chaowalit Srimankongtham
- Thanatphan Buranacheewavilai
- Warinda Damrongpol
- Morakot Sangthaweep
- Chalermpol Tikhampornthirawong
