= Phetchaburi (disambiguation) =

Phetchaburi may refer to

== In Southern Thailand ==
- Phetchaburi, a town
- Phetchaburi Province, the province of which Phetchaburi Town is the capital of
- Mueang Phetchaburi district, the capital district of the province
- Phetchaburi River
- Phetchaburi Railway Station

== In Bangkok ==
- Phetchaburi MRT station, a rapid transit station
