= Terminal 21 =

Chain of mixed-use complexes

Coordinates: 13°44′15″N 100°33′38″E

- Type: Private
- Industry: Mixed-use development
- Founded: 2011; 15 years ago (premiere location)
- Headquarters: Thailand: Asok (Bangkok); Korat; Pattaya; Rama 3 (Bangkok)
- Products: Terminal 21 Asok; Terminal 21 Korat; Terminal 21 Pattaya; Terminal 21 Rama 3
- Parent: L&H Property Co., Ltd.: Retail: Siam Retail Development; Hotel: Centre Point Hospitality
- Website: www.terminal21.co.th

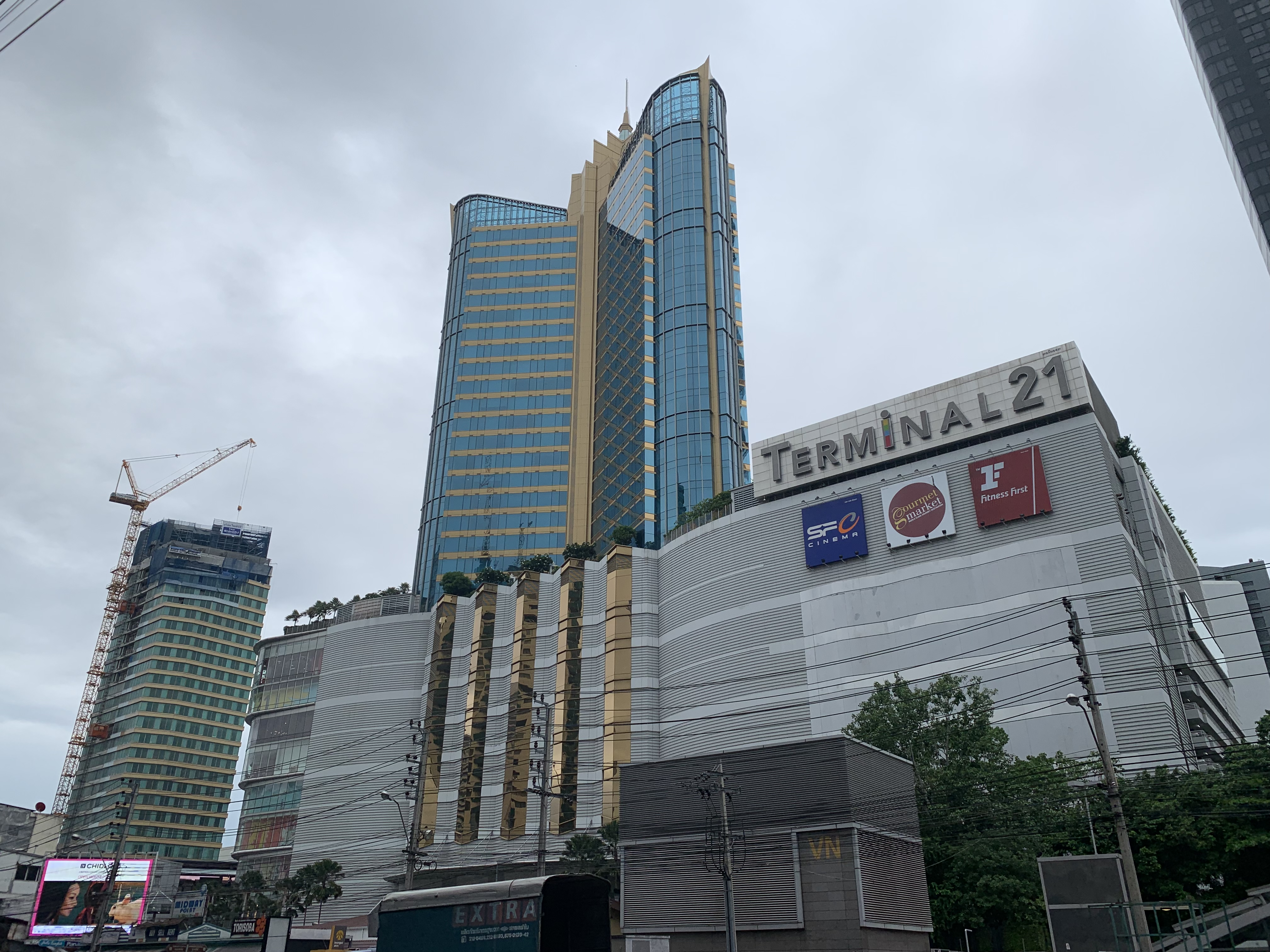
Terminal 21 Asok and Grand Centre Point Hotel

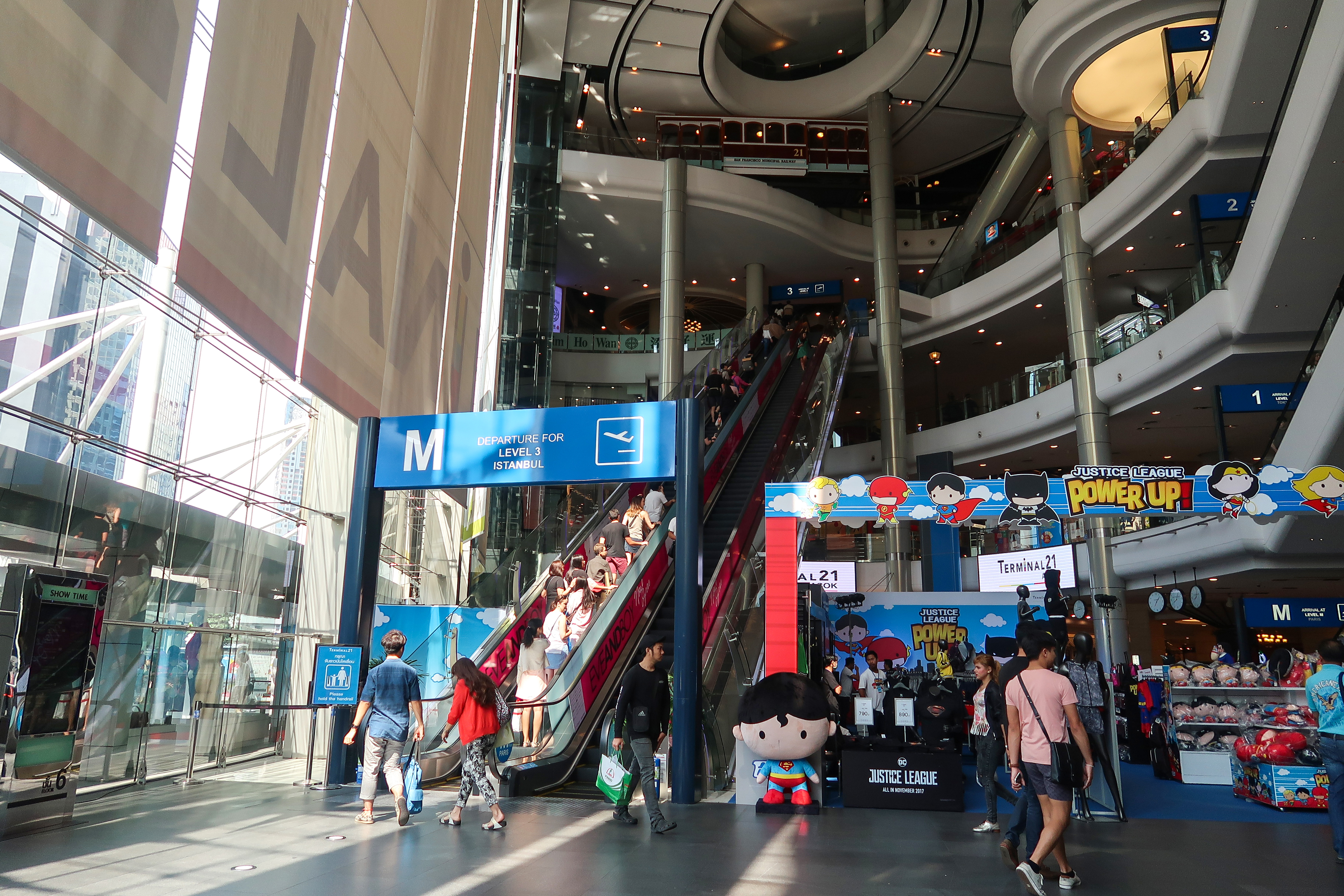
Terminal 21 Sukhumvit Atrium

Terminal 21 (Thai: เทอร์มินอล 21) is a chain of mixed-use complexes with 4 locations in Thailand; Asok and Rama III in Bangkok, Korat, and Pattaya. The first location was opened in October 2011, located on Sukhumvit Road, by the Asoke intersection, in Watthana District of Bangkok, Thailand. The second location, Terminal 21 Korat, was opened in December 2016 and is located on Mittraphap Road in Nakhon Ratchasima Province (also called Korat). Terminal 21 Pattaya was opened in October 2018 and is located in Pattaya District of Chonburi Province. On October 20, 2022, Terminal 21 Rama III officially opened by the Chao Phraya river in the Rama III neighbourhood of Yannawa District in Bangkok.

The name "Terminal 21" is meant to represent the concept that each retail floor represents different touristic cities. The number "21" refers to Soi Sukhumvit 21 (Asok Montri Road) where its first branch in Bangkok is located. Each Terminal 21 complex consists of: a multi-storied retail area with each floors being decorated in the theme of touristic cities around the world, a SF Cinema City movie theatre, and a hotel-and-residence operated by Centre Point Hospitality company.

== Locations ==
=== Terminal 21 Asok ===
Terminal 21 Asok opened in Bangkok in 11 October 2011. It is located in Watthana district, situated at the Sukhumvit and Asok intersection. It links to BTS Skytrain and MRT with a skywalk, at Asok Station and Sukhumvit Station. This mall has the longest escalators in Thailand, up to 36 meters. The retail area has a total of 10 stories anchored by an SF Cinema and a Gourmet Market (a division of The Mall Group). The Grande Centre Point hotel & residence is a 42-story, 202-meter high building. On 7 February 2026, a construction crane collapsed at a nearby site adjacent to the mall, injuring two workers. The incident is referred to as the 2026 Asok crane colapse.

=== Terminal 21 Korat ===
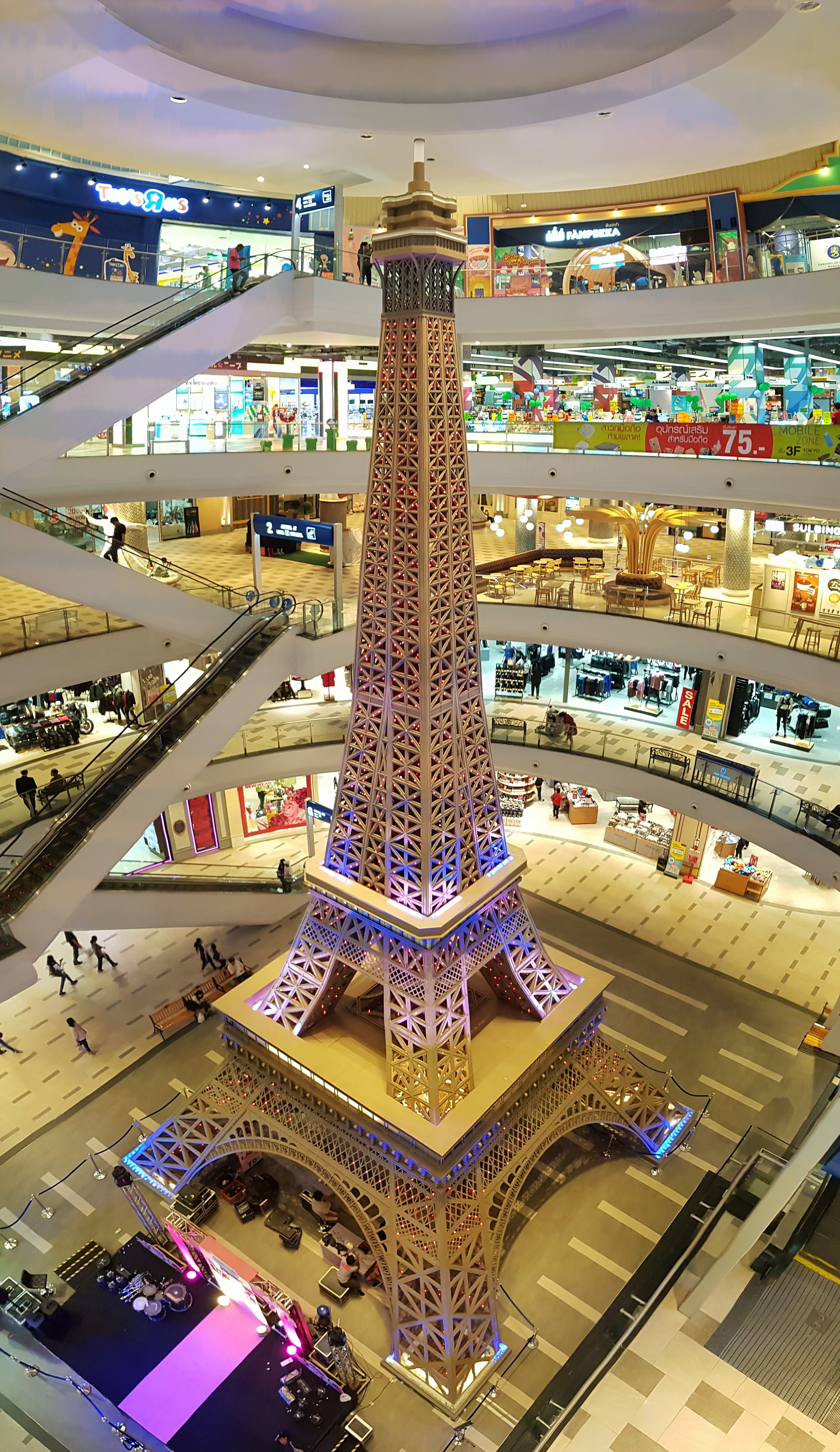
Eiffel Tower replica inside of the Terminal 21 Korat

Terminal 21 Korat in Nakhon Ratchasima Province (also known locally as Korat) was opened in 4 February 2017. It is located on the Mittraphap Road by the Ratchasima-Chokchai intersection in Mueang Nakhon Ratchasima District. The retail area consists of seven floors, including a skydeck, an SF Cinema, and a Foodland supermarket.

=== Terminal 21 Pattaya ===
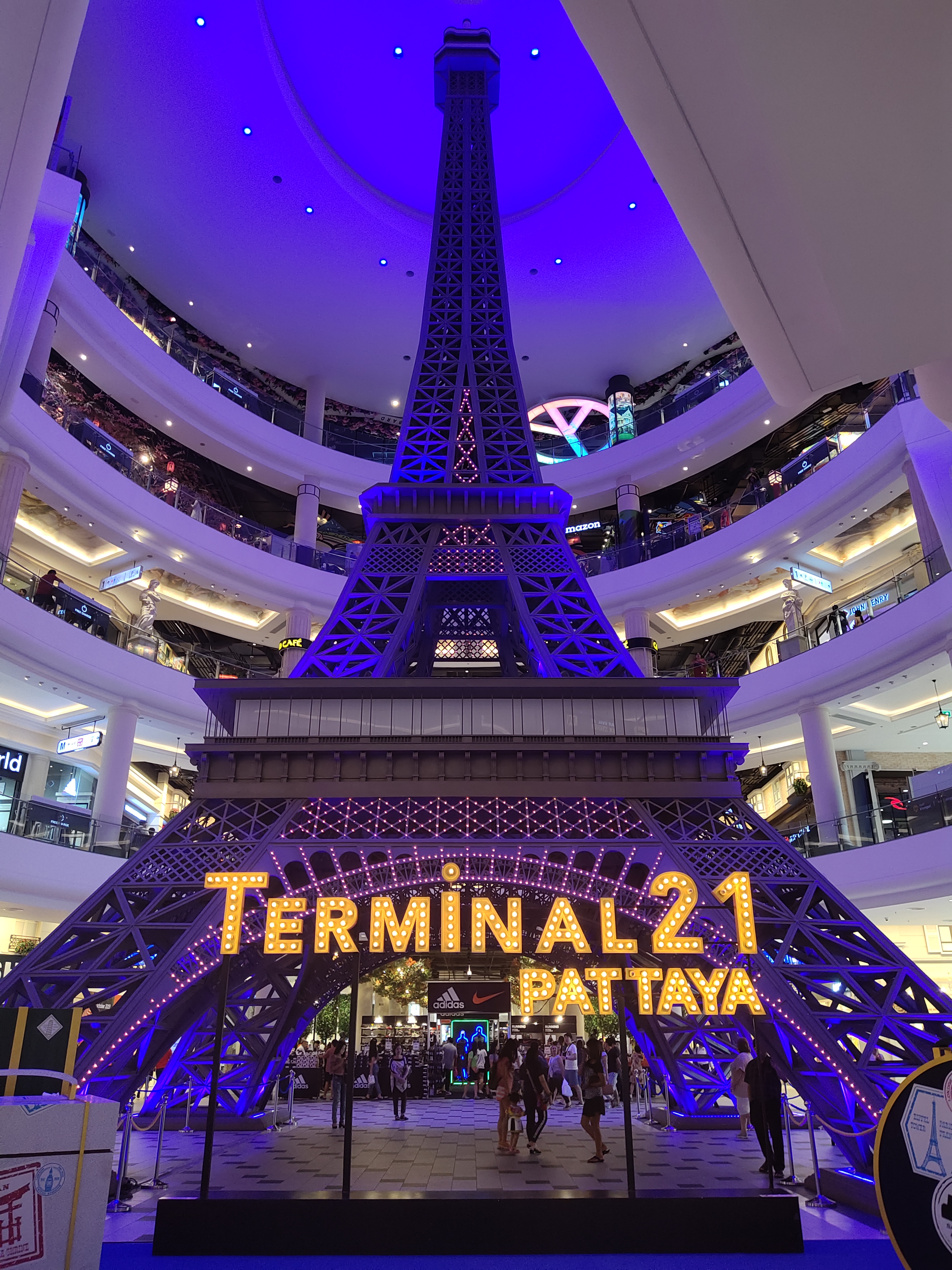
Eiffel Tower replica inside of the Terminal 21 Pattaya

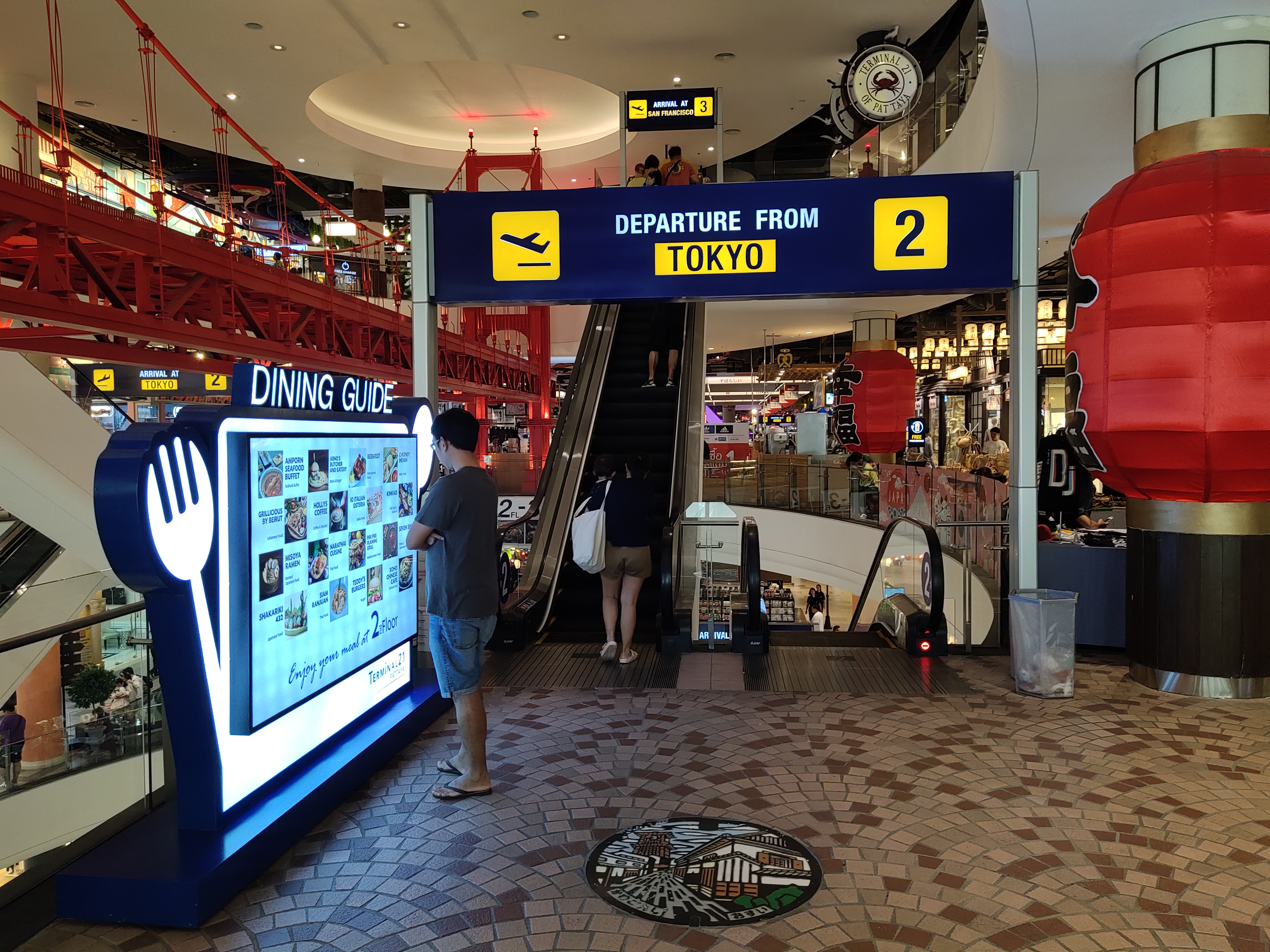
Tokyo-themed floor in Terminal 21 Pattaya

Terminal 21 Pattaya was opened in Pattaya city, Chonburi Province on 19 October 2018. It is located on the corner of the North Pattaya Road and Second Road, next to the Pla Lo Ma Roundabout. The retail area consists of 6 floors, including an SFX Cinema cinema and Foodland supermarket. Terminal 21 Pattaya also houses 32-story Grande Centre Point Pattaya hotel & residence.

=== Terminal 21 Rama III ===
Terminal 21 Rama III was opened on October 20, 2022, on Rama 3 Road in Bangkok’s Bang Kho Laem district. The mall contains 9 floors of shops and a parking lot for 1,658 cars across 140,000 square metres of usable space. It is served by Charoenrat station on Bangkok BRT.

== Retail concept ==
Terminal 21 is a 40,000-square-metre (430,000 sq ft) one-floor-one-themed shopping mall. Each floor is decorated based on touristic cities and locations around the world; The Caribbean, Rome, Paris, Tokyo, London, Istanbul, San Francisco, and Hollywood. The decoration may differ amongst the branches of Terminal 21, while the locations being themed remain the same.

== See also ==
- Nakhon Ratchasima shootings — one of the shooting locations took place in Terminal 21 Korat
