= Phetchaburi station =

Phetchaburi station may refer to:

- Phetchaburi MRT station, an underground rapid transit station in Bangkok
- Phetchaburi railway station, the main railway station of Phetchaburi
