= Asok BTS station =

Station

Asok อโศก
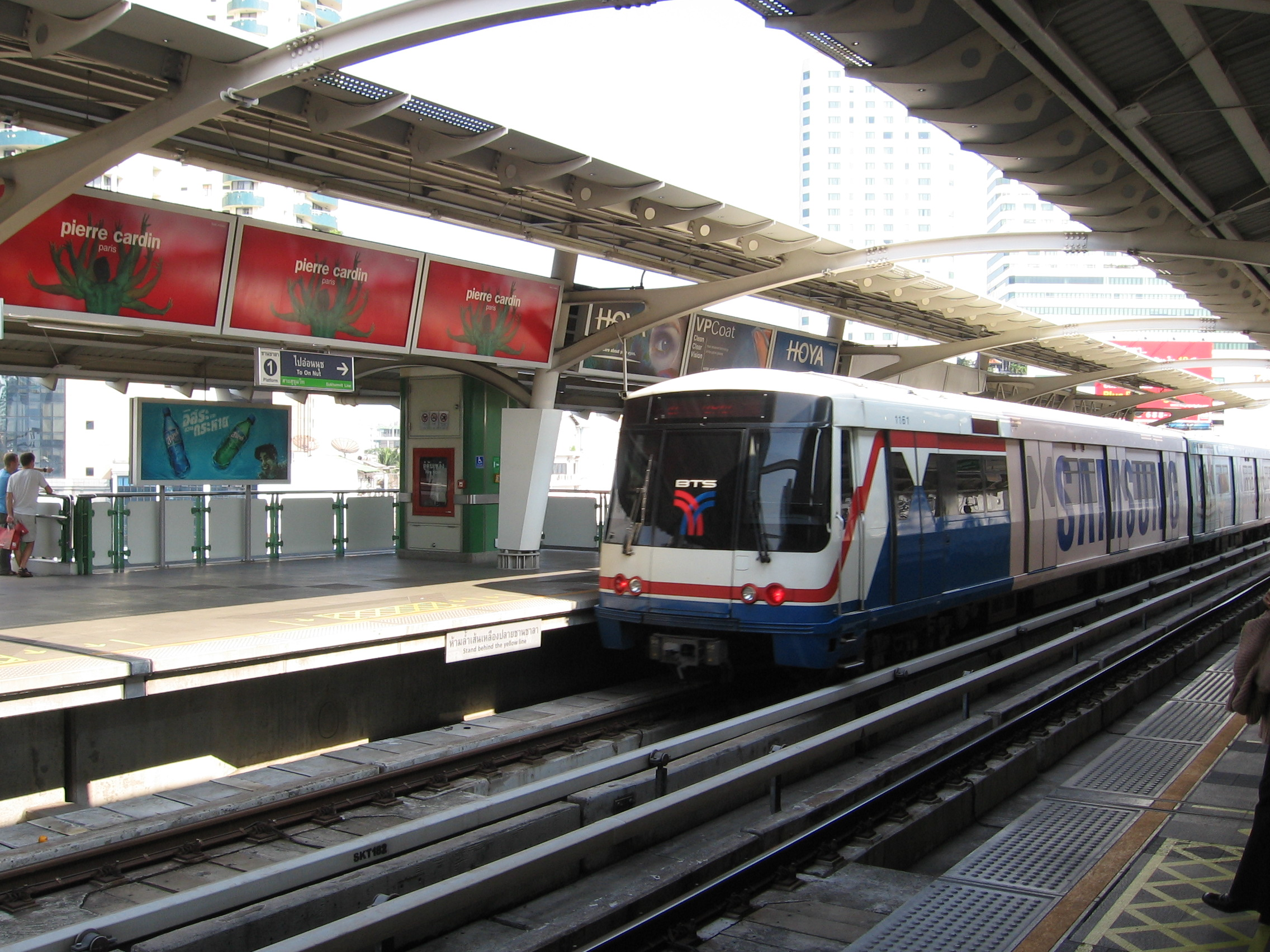
- Train leaving Asok station in 2006

General information
- Location: Wattana and Khlong Toei; Bangkok; Thailand
- Coordinates: 13°44′13.32″N 100°33′37.51″E
- System: BTS
- Owner: Bangkok Metropolitan Administration (BMA); BTS Rail Mass Transit Growth Infrastructure Fund (BTSGIF)
- Operator: Bangkok Mass Transit System; Public Company Limited (BTSC)
- Line: Sukhumvit Line

Other information
- Station code: E4

History
- Opened: 5 December 1999

Passengers
- 2021: 5,542,521

Services
Preceding station	BTS Skytrain	Following station
Nana towards Khu Khot	Sukhumvit Line	Phrom Phong towards Kheha
Preceding station	Metropolitan Rapid Transit	Following station
QSNCC towards Lak Song	Blue Line transfer at Sukhumvit	Phetchaburi towards Tha Phra
Location

Asok station (Thai: สถานีอโศก, pronounced [sā.tʰǎː.nīː ʔā.sòːk]) is a BTS Skytrain station on the Sukhumvit Line in Watthana and Khlong Toei Districts, Bangkok, Thailand. The station is located on Sukhumvit Road at Asok Montri Intersection, with an interchange to MRT Blue Line at Sukhumvit station. Around the station, there are many hotels and facilities for foreign tourists and business people. The area to the west is a continuation of the Nana entertainment zone, and to the east is a dense commercial area with numerous skyscrapers.

== History ==
Asok station opened on 5 December 1999 as part of the Sukhumvit Line, which ran 17 kilometers from Mo Chit Station to On Nut Station at the time.

Originally, this place was the location of Si Krung, a film studio and cinema that produced the first sound film in Thailand. It ceased operations during World War II. The film studio was established in 1927, five years before the Siamese revolution.

== Exits ==
- Exit 1 Sukhumvit Soi 19, Bus stop (to Phrom Phong), M floor of Terminal 21 shopping mall
- Exit 2 Bus stop (to Nana), Sukhumvit Soi 12
- Exit 3 MRT Sukhumvit station, Asok Montri Road, The Siam Society Under Royal Patronage, Srinakharinwirot University, M floor of Terminal 21 shopping mall
- Exit 4 Sukhumvit Soi 14, Sukhumvit Soi 16, Ratchadaphisek Road, Benjakitti Park

== Gallery ==
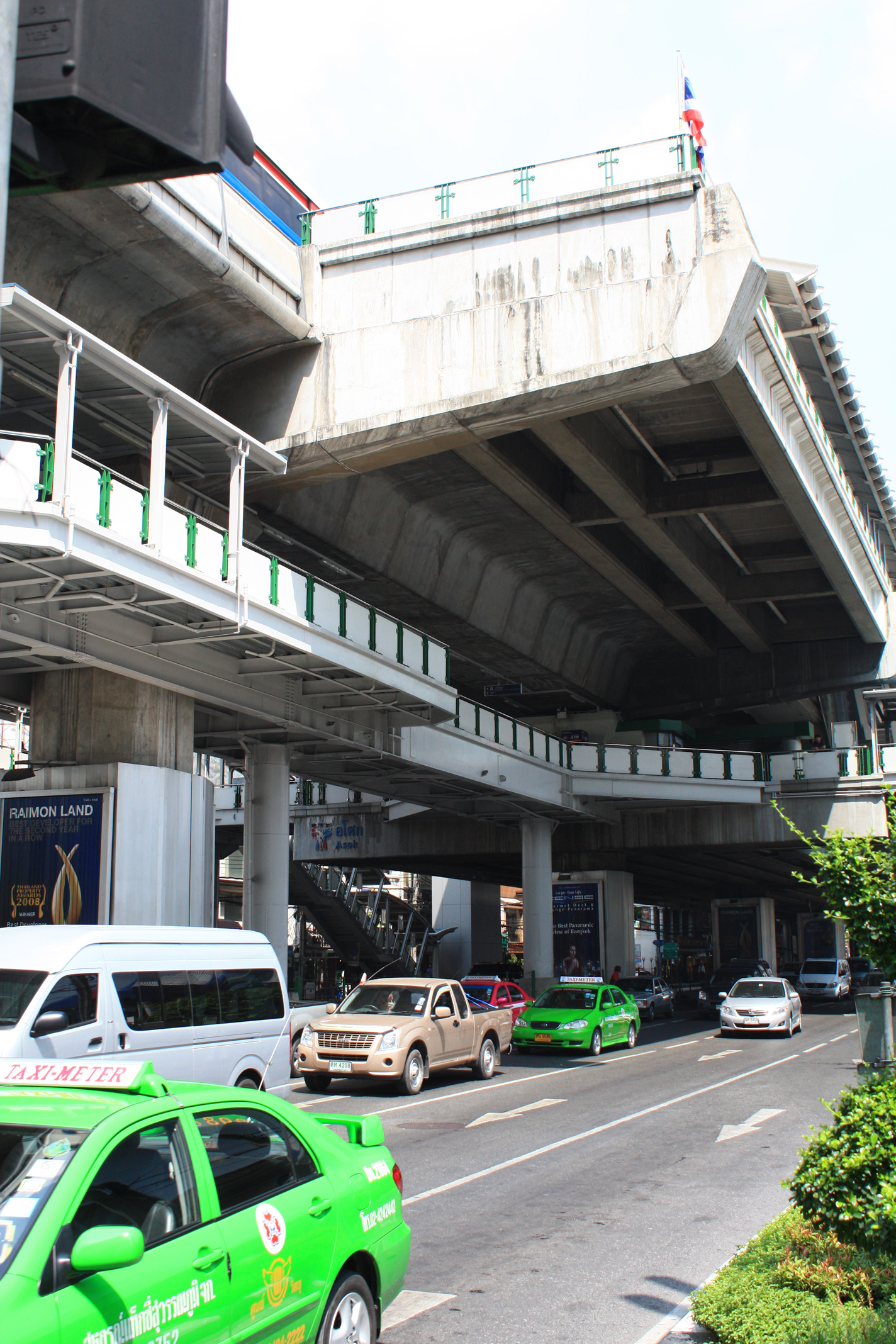
Asok station as seen from the busy streets of Bangkok

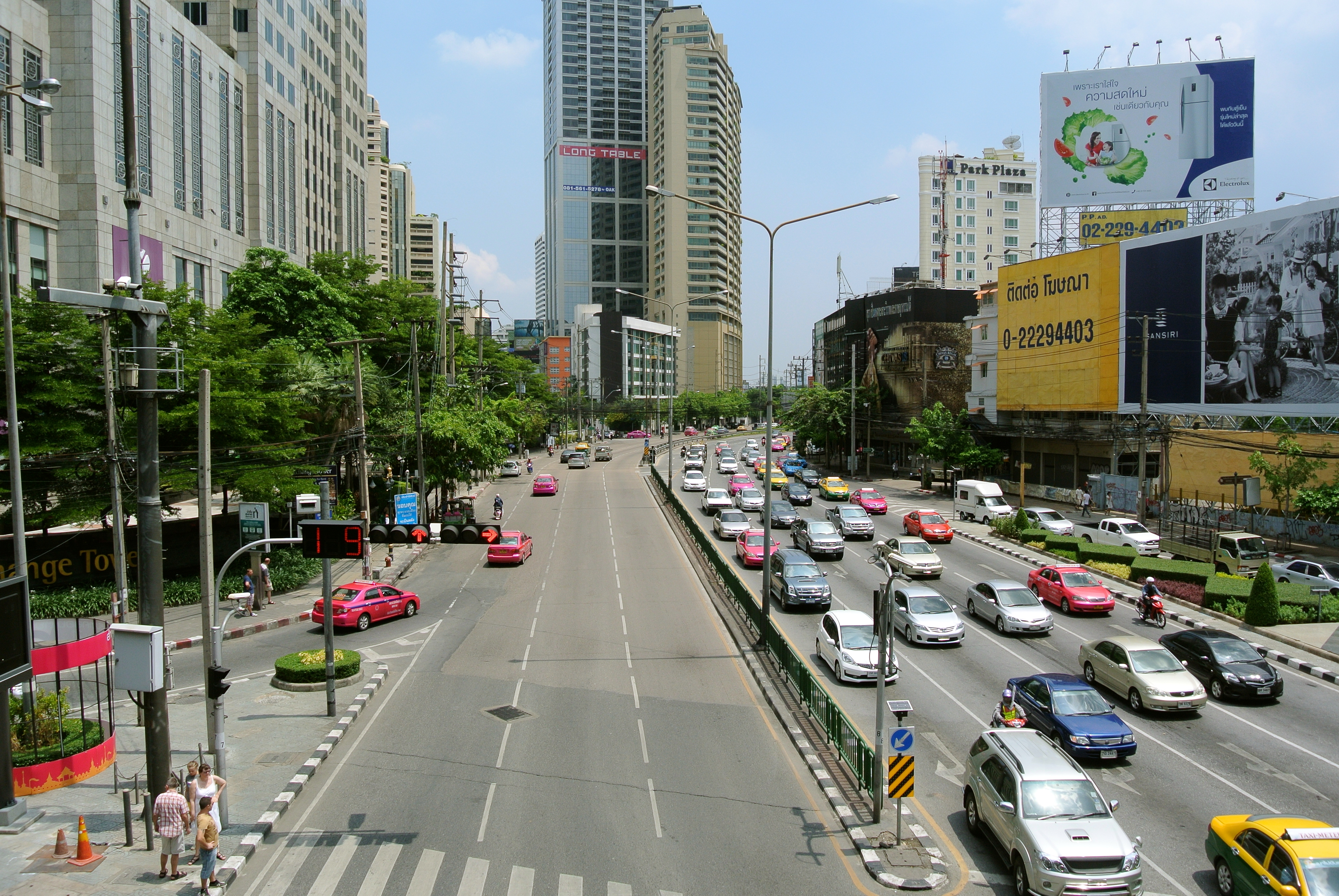
Ratchadaphisek Road at Asok junction, with Sukhumvit Road seen to the south

Asok station traditional sign
