= Bang Kapi subdistrict =

Khwaeng in Bangkok, Thailand

Coordinates: 13°44′38.5″N 100°35′22.7″E

Bang Kapi บางกะปิ
- Khwaeng
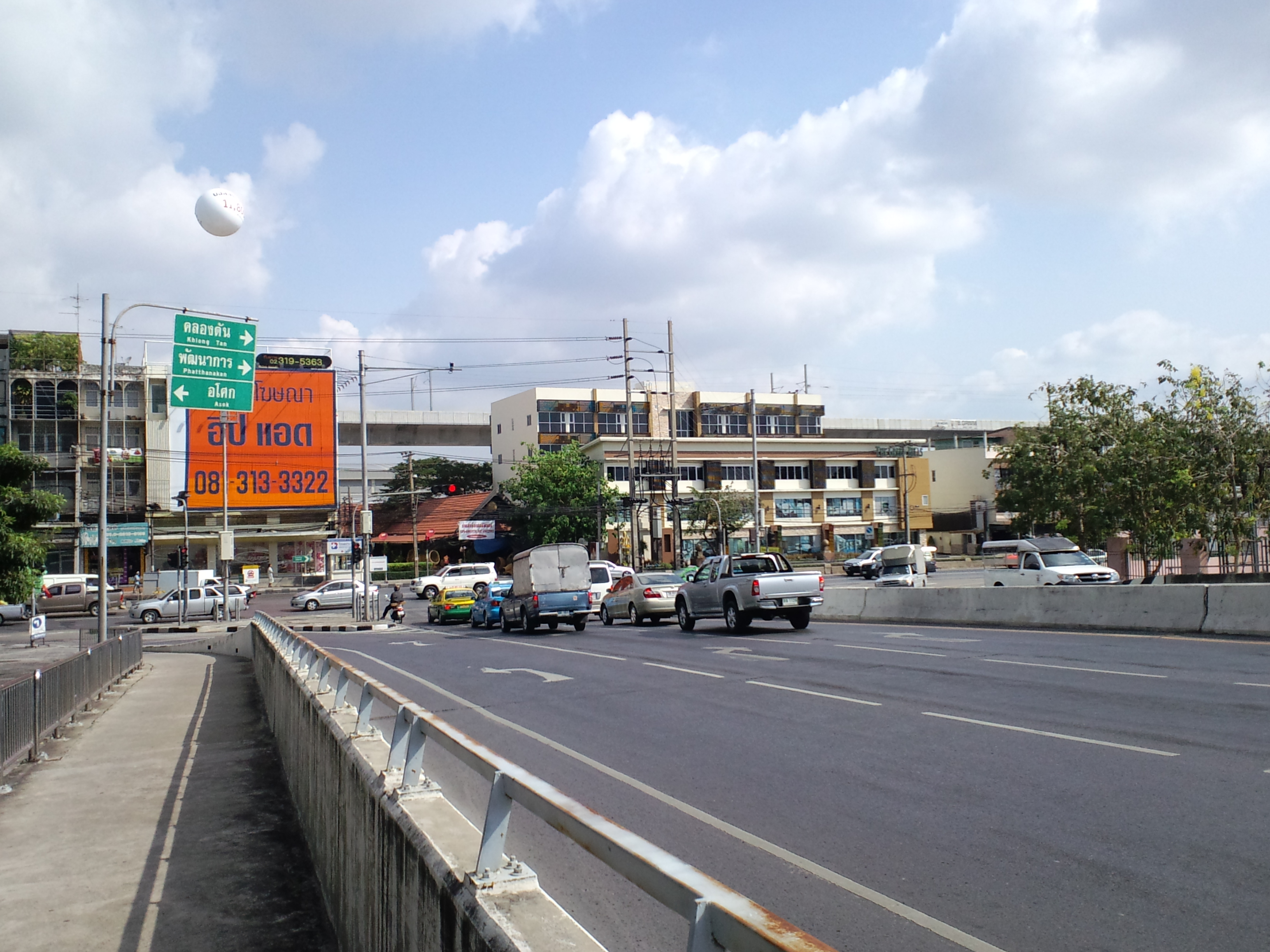
- Final stretch of Ekkamai Road that crosses Khlong Saen Seap in Bang Kapi Subdistrict area.

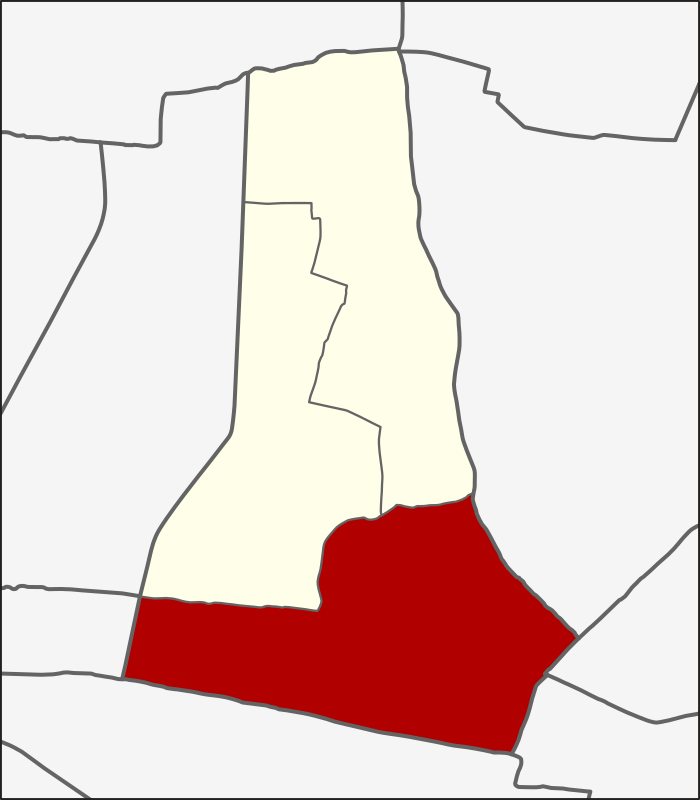
- Location in Huai Khwang District
- Country: Thailand
- Province: Bangkok
- Khet: Huai Khwang

Area
  - Total: 5.408 km^{2} (2.088 sq mi)

Population (2018)
  - Total: 17,606
  - Density: 3,255.54/km^{2} (8,431.8/sq mi)
- Time zone: UTC+7 (ICT)
- Postal code: 10310
- TIS 1099: 101702

Bang Kapi (Thai: บางกะปิ, pronounced [bāːŋ kāpìʔ]) is a khwaeng (subdistrict) of Huai Khwang District, Bangkok.

== History ==
The name "Bang Kapi" comes from "Thung Bang Kapi" (ทุ่งบางกะปิ), a vast field that once stretched from the southern part of Ayutthaya Province to Bangkok, and from the eastern side of the Chao Phraya River to the Nakhon Nayok River. The landscape consisted of lowlands with swamps, grove woods, dense grasses, and reeds, standing only 1–2 meters (approximately 3–6 feet) above sea level. As a result, the area experienced annual floods that lasted for 3–4 months at a time. It was also home to a variety of wildlife, including tigers, elephants, barking deers, gaurs, and the now-extinct Schomburgk's deer. The area was considered part of the broader region known as "Thung Luang" (ทุ่งหลวง), meaning "the great field".

During the reign of King Rama III, the Khlong Saen Saep canal was excavated to serve as a shortcut for transporting military equipment during the Siamese–Vietnamese War. The canal flows through the Thung Bang Kapi area toward Chachoengsao Province in the east. Today, it remains the longest canal in Thailand and has several branches, such as Khlong Bang Kapi, Khlong Hua Mak, Khlong Chan, Khlong Tan, and Khlong Chaokhun Sing. These names have since been adopted as the names of subdistricts in modern-day Bangkok. Muslim communities began to settle along the canal, as many Muslim labourers had played a key role in the canal's construction.

The vast expanse of Thung Bang Kapi once covered areas that now include Makkasan, Bang Kapi, Wang Thonglang, Lat Phrao, and parts of Sukhumvit Road. This area also served as the setting for the classic Thai tragic novel Plae Kao (แผลเก่า) by Mai Mueangdoem. In the early 1960s, the extension of Phetchaburi Road (New Phetchaburi Road) to Khlong Tan led to the development of many sois (alleyways) that connected to Sukhumvit Road to the south. Consequently, the once expansive Bang Kapi area began to shrink to its present-day boundaries.

In 1974, Bang Kapi, along with Huai Khwang, was separated from Phaya Thai District to become a full district and subdistrict of its own.

== Geography ==
Bang Kapi has most of the area between Phetchaburi (section New Phetchaburi Road) and Rama IX Roads. It has 12 communities. The area is bordered by neighbouring subdistricts (from north clockwise): Huai Khwang in its district (Khlong Saen Saep is a borderline), Wang Thonglang of Wang Thonglang District (Khlong Lat Phrao is a borderline), Hua Mak of Bang Kapi District (Khlong Saen Saep is a borderline), Suan Luang of Suan Luang District (Khlong Saen Saep is a borderline), Khlong Tan Nuea of Watthana District (Khlong Saen Saep is a borderline), Makkasan of Ratchathewi District (Asok-Montri Road is a borderline).

== Places ==
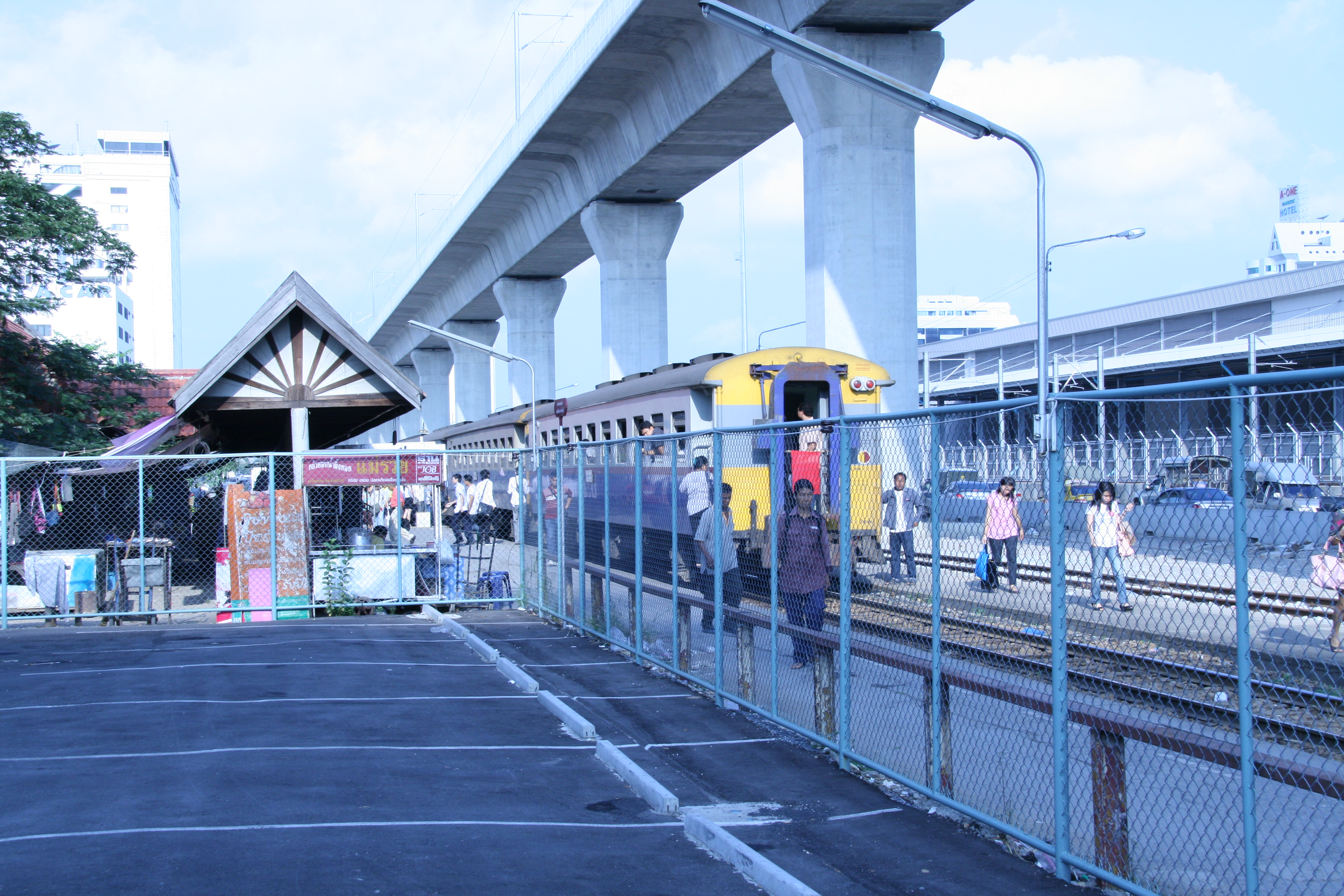
Khlong Tan Railway Station.

- Khlong Tan Railway Station
- Asok Railway Halt
- Praram 9 Hospital
- Thai-Japanese Association School
- Wat Uthai Tharam (Wat Bang Kapi)
- Petcharavej Hospital
- Piyavate Hospital
- Makkasan Metropolitan Police Station
- Somdet Saranrat Manirom Park
