= Khlong Tan railway station =

Train station in Thailand

Coordinates: 13°44′39.3″N 100°35′22.9″E

Khlong Tan คลองตัน
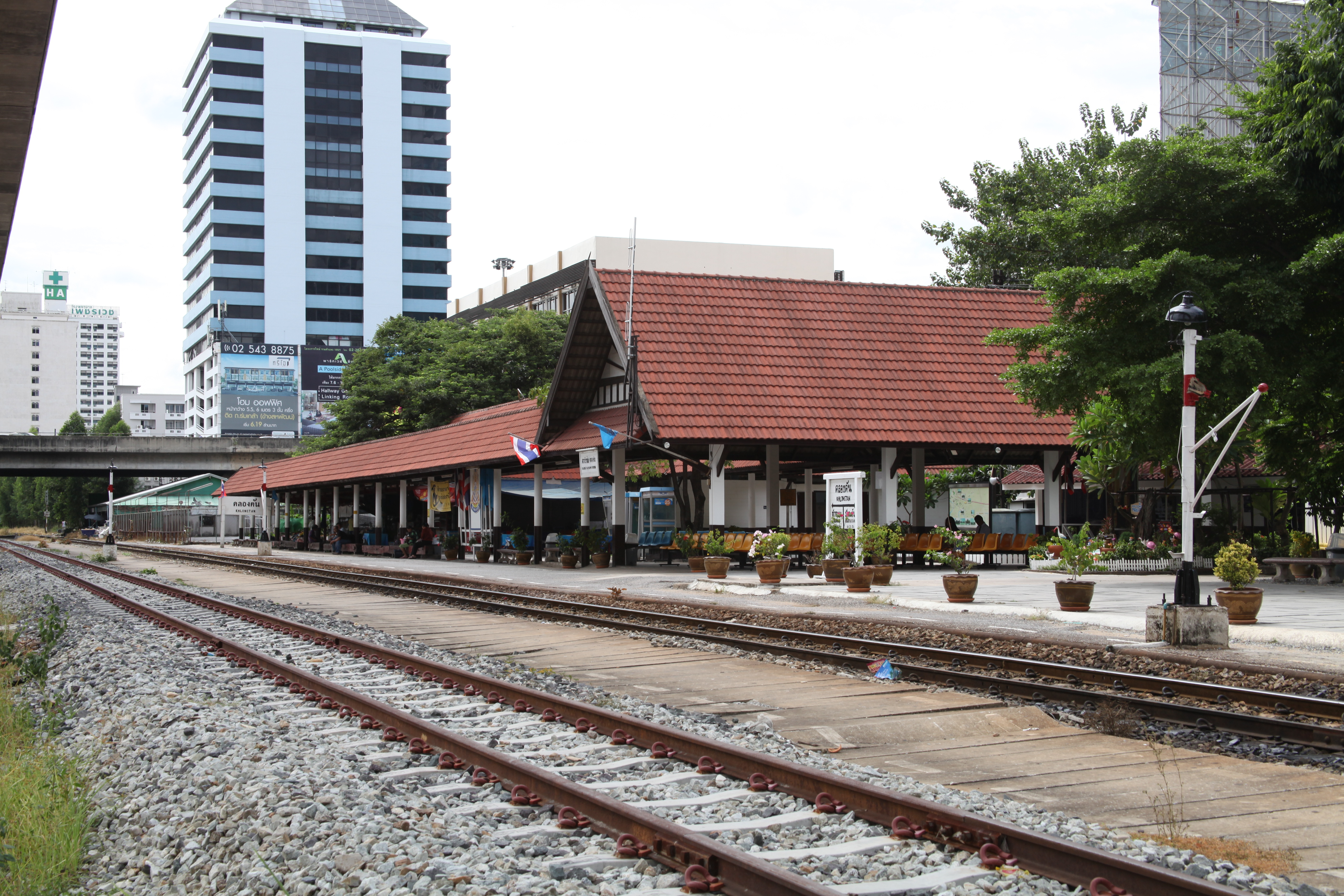

General information
- Location: Kamphaeng Phet 7 Rd, Bang Kapi Subdistrict, Huai Khwang District; Bangkok; Thailand
- Operator: State Railway of Thailand (SRT)
- Manager: Ministry of Transport
- Platforms: 1
- Tracks: 2

Construction
- Structure type: At-grade
- Parking: Yes

Other information
- Station code: คต.
- Classification: Class 2

Services
Preceding station	State Railway of Thailand	Following station
Asok Halt towards Hua Lamphong	Eastern Line	Sukhumvit 71 Halt towards Chuk Samet or Poipet (Cambodia)
Location

Khlong Tan railway station (Thai: สถานีรถไฟคลองตัน, RTGS: Sathani Rotfai Khlong Tan, pronounced [sà.tʰǎː.niː rót.faj kʰlɔ̄ːŋ tan]) is a railway station in Bang Kapi Subdistrict, Huai Khwang District, Bangkok. The station is a part of eastern railway line and is a class 2 railway station located 9.85 km (6.1 mi) from Hua Lamphong (Bangkok railway station).

Khlong Tan railway station is tucked away in a lane on the side of outbound Phetchaburi Road, in the New Phetchaburi section, opposite Ekkamai Nuea Junction, where Ekkamai meets Phetchaburi Road.

In the 1970s, the environment around the station still retained a rural atmosphere. When passengers got off the train and walked out onto the main road, they had to cross a wooden bridge over the ditch first.

The Airport Rail Link passes through this station on its own elevated viaduct, but does not stop at this station. Instead, the closest stations to the Airport Rail Link are at Asok Halt and Ramkaehang (Sukhumvit 71) stations.

== Train services ==
- Ordinary train No. 275/276 Bangkok – Aranyaprathet – Bangkok
- Ordinary train No. 277/278 Bangkok – Kabin Buri – Bangkok
- Ordinary train No. 279/280 Bangkok – Aranyaprathet – Bangkok
- Ordinary train No. 281/282 Bangkok – Kabin Buri – Bangkok
- Ordinary train No. 283/284 (Note: runs on weekdays only) Bangkok – Ban Phlu Ta Luang – Bangkok
- Ordinary train No. 285/286 (Note: runs on weekends only) Bangkok – Chachoengsao Junction – Bangkok
- Ordinary train No. 367/368 Bangkok – Chachoengsao Junction – Bangkok
- Ordinary train No. 371/372 Bangkok – Prachin Buri – Bangkok
- Ordinary train No. 376/378 Rangsit – Hua Takhe – Bangkok
- Ordinary train No. 379/380 Bangkok – Hua Takhe – Bangkok
- Ordinary train No. 381/382 Bangkok – Chachoengsao Junction – Bangkok
- Ordinary train No. 383/388 Bangkok – Chachoengsao Junction – Bangkok
- Ordinary train No. 389/390 Bangkok – Chachoengsao Junction – Bangkok
- Ordinary train No. 391/384 Bangkok – Chachoengsao Junction – Bangkok
