= Phetchaburi MRT station =

Metro station in Bangkok, Thailand

Coordinates: 13.7491°N 100.5630°E

เพชรบุรี Phetchaburi
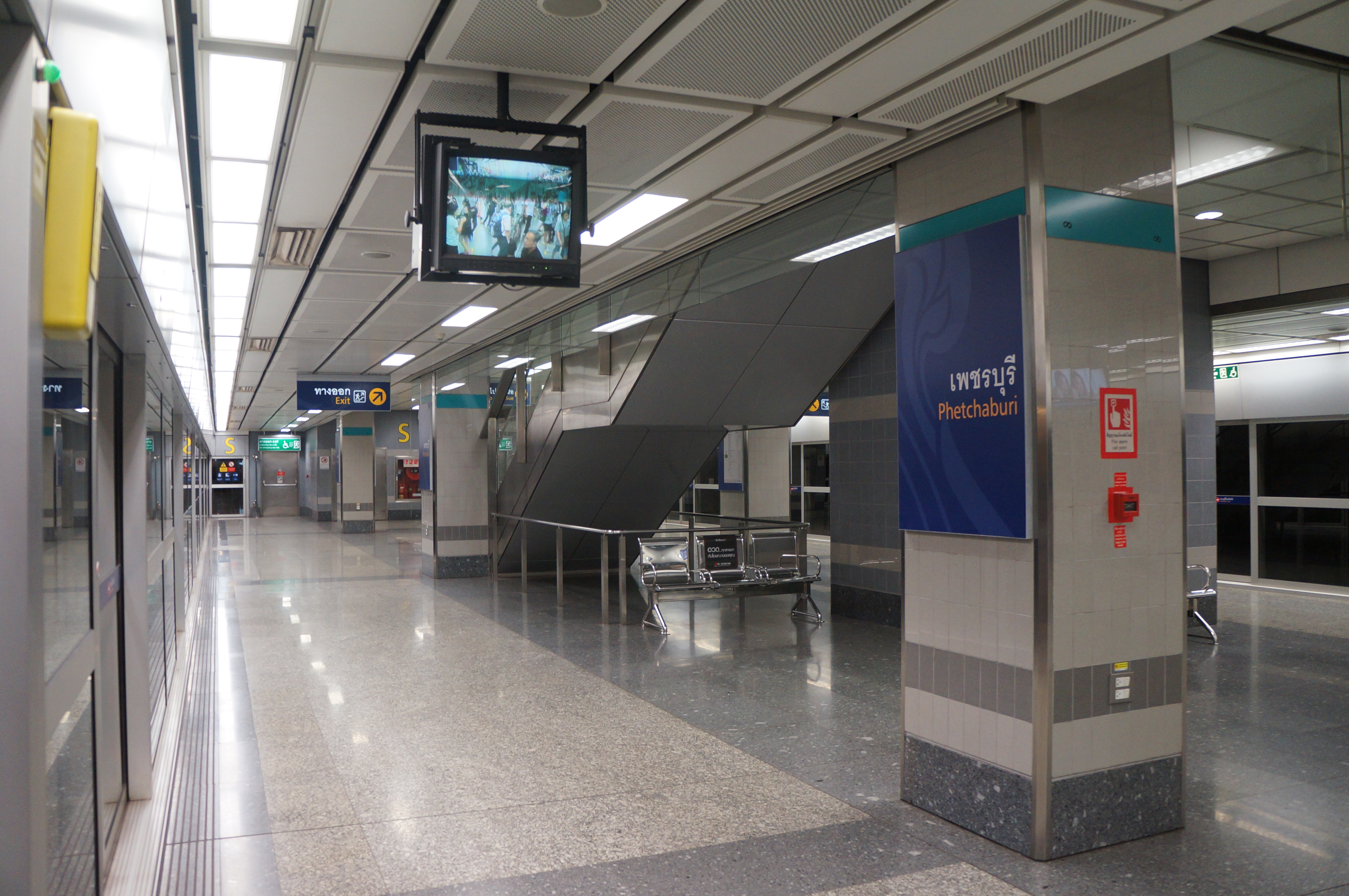

General information
- Location: Makkasan, Ratchathewi and Bang Kapi, Huai Khwang, Bangkok, Thailand
- System: MRT
- Owner: Mass Rapid Transit Authority of Thailand (MRTA)
- Operator: Bangkok Expressway and Metro Public Company Limited (BEM)
- Line: Blue Line
- Platforms: 1 island platform
- Tracks: 2
- Connections: ARL Airport Rail Link via Makkasan station Eastern Line via Asok Halt; Khlong Saen Saep boat service

Construction
- Structure type: Underground
- Accessible: yes

Other information
- Station code: BL21

History
- Opened: 3 July 2004; 22 years ago

Passengers
- 2021: 6,791,555

Services
Preceding station	Metropolitan Rapid Transit	Following station
Sukhumvit towards Lak Song	Blue Line	Phra Ram 9 towards Tha Phra
Preceding station	Airport Rail Link	Following station
Ratchaprarop towards Phaya Thai	City Line transfer at Makkasan	Ramkhamhaeng towards Suvarnabhumi
Preceding station	State Railway of Thailand	Following station
Makkasan towards Hua Lamphong	Eastern Line transfer at Asok Halt	Khlong Tan towards Chuk Samet or Poipet (Cambodia)
Location

Phetchaburi MRT station (Thai: สถานีเพชรบุรี, pronounced [sā.tʰǎː.nīː pʰét.t͡ɕʰā.bū.rīː]; code BL21) is a Bangkok MRT station on the Blue Line. It is located under the junction of Asok and New Phetchaburi Road. Commuters can transfer to the Airport Rail Link at Makkasan Station, and the SRT Eastern Line at Asok Halt, located at ground level.

== Station details ==
The station uses symbol of a water wave referring to Khlong Saen Saeb. It is an underground station, 23 metres (75 ft) wide and 200 metres (660 ft) in length, with a depth of 20 metres (66 ft), and uses island platform

There is a MetroMall in the station.

== Connection with ARL ==
Phetchaburi station is connected to Makkasan station by a covered-elevated footpath. Fare and ticket systems between the two lines are not integrated.

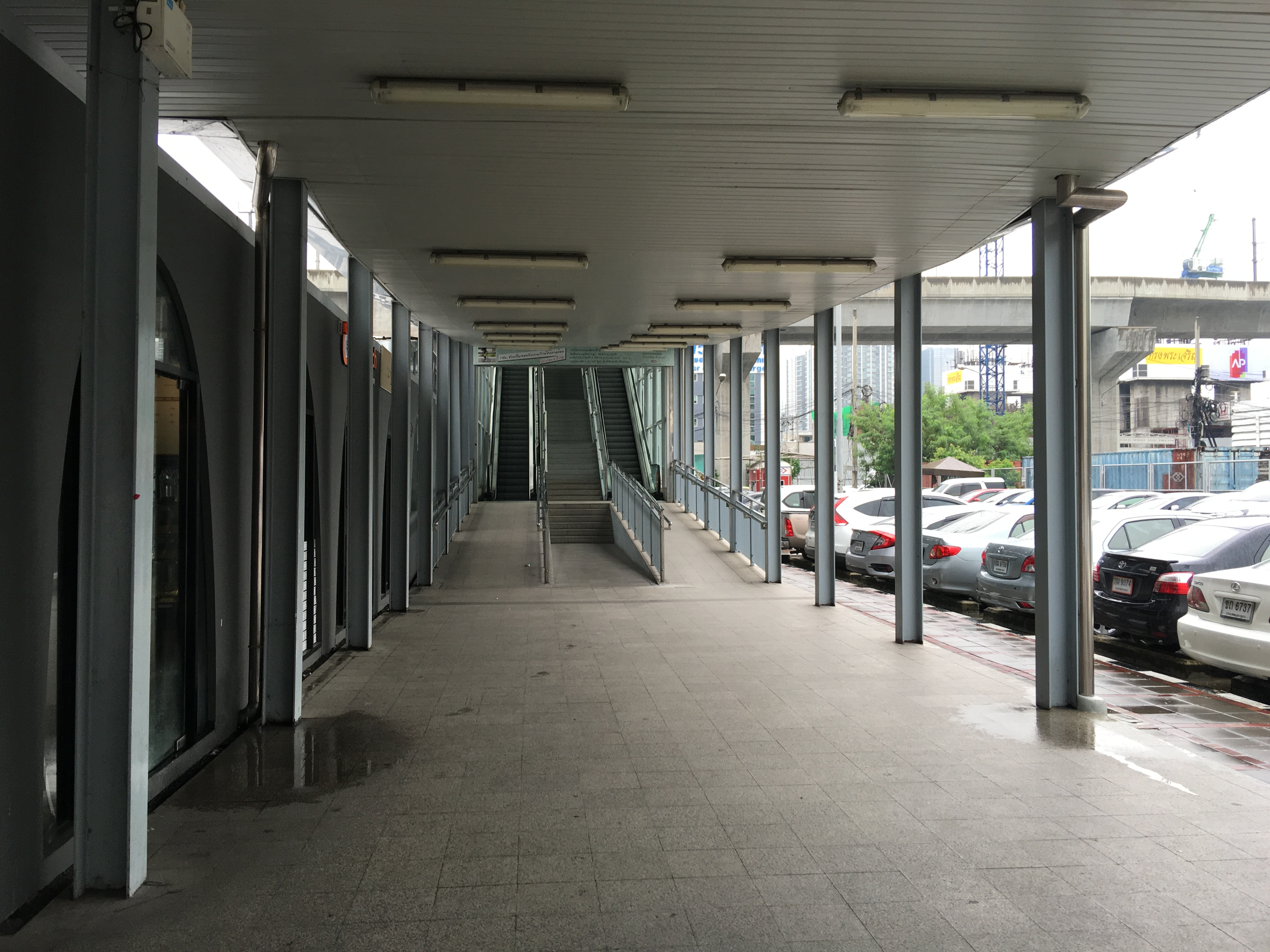
Covered, elevated footpath connecting the MRT and SARL stations.

== Station layout ==
FB	Skywalk	Footbridge to Makkasan Station
G	-	Bus stop
B1	Basement	Exits 1–3 and Underground Mall
B2	Concourse	Ticket machines
B3	Platform 2	Blue towards Tha Phra via Bang Sue (Phra Ram 9)
B3	Island platform, doors will open on the right
B3	Platform 1	Blue towards Lak Song (Sukhumvit)
