= Phra Ram 9 MRT station =

Railway station in Bangkok, Thailand

พระราม 9 Phra Ram 9
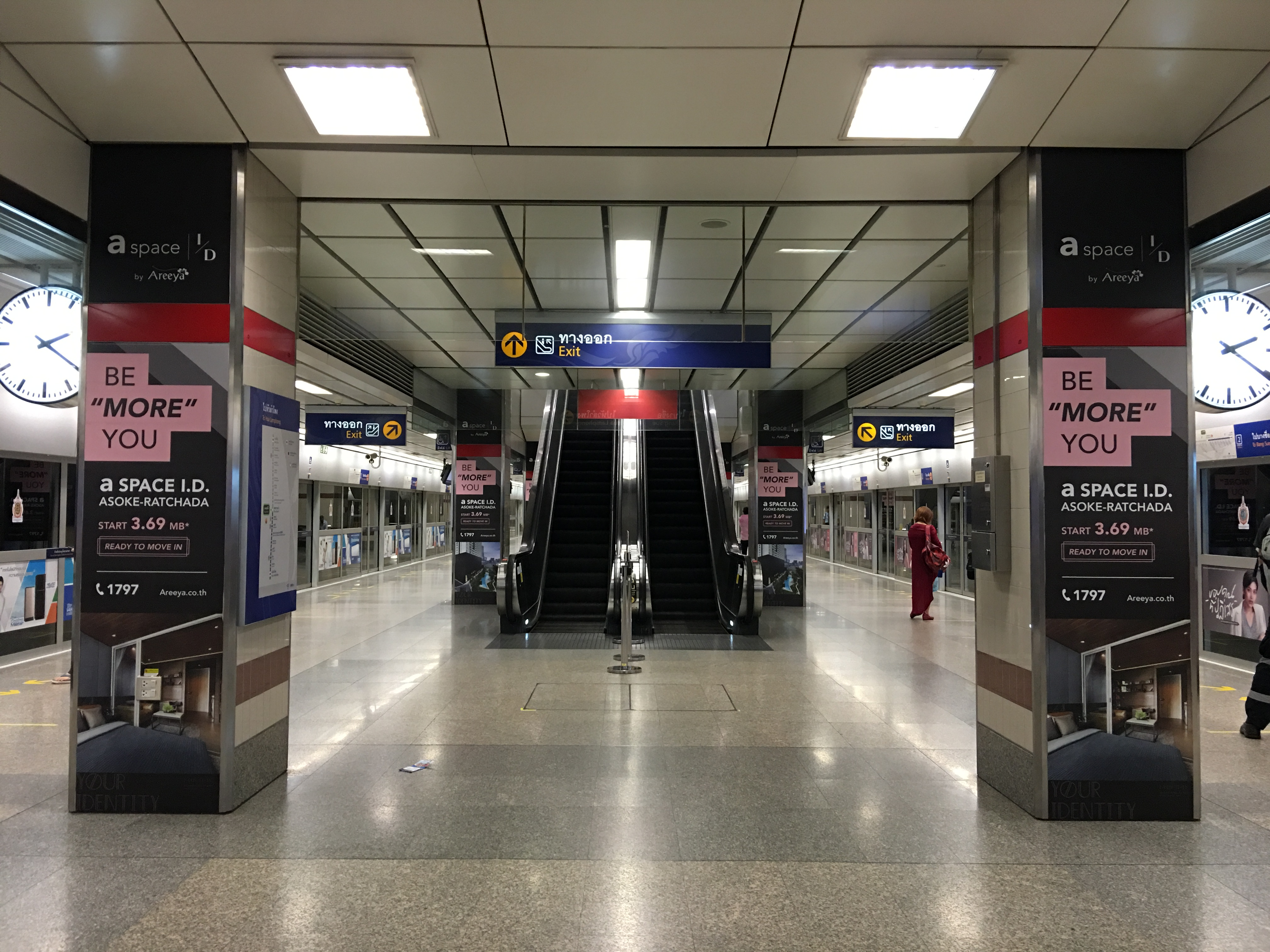

General information
- Location: Din Daeng and Huai Khwang, Bangkok
- Coordinates: 13°45′26″N 100°33′55″E
- System: MRT
- Owner: Mass Rapid Transit Authority of Thailand (MRTA)
- Operator: Bangkok Expressway and Metro Public Company Limited (BEM)
- Line: MRT MRT Blue Line
- Platforms: Island platform
- Tracks: 2

Construction
- Structure type: Underground

Other information
- Station code: BL20

History
- Opened: 3 July 2004; 22 years ago

Passengers
- 2021: 6,855,613

Services
Preceding station	Metropolitan Rapid Transit	Following station
Phetchaburi towards Lak Song	Blue Line	Thailand Cultural Centre towards Tha Phra via Bang Sue
Location

Phra Ram 9 station (Thai: สถานีพระราม 9, RTGS: Sathani Phra Ram Kao, pronounced [sā.tʰǎː.nīː pʰráʔ rāːm kâːw]) is a Bangkok MRT station named after Rama IX on the Chaloem Ratchamongkhon line, in Bangkok, Thailand. It serves Fortune Town and G-Land developments around the road junction of the same name, where Din Daeng, Asok-Din Daeng, Ratchadaphisek and Rama IX roads intersect.

The master plan map of the Mass Rapid Transit Master Plan in Bangkok Metropolitan Region (M-Map) contains a planned station of the planned MRT Grey line with the same station name.

== Station layout ==
G	-	Bus stop
B1	Basement	Exits 1–3 and Underground Mall
B2	Concourse	Ticket machines
B3	Platform 2	Blue towards Tha Phra via Bang Sue (Thailand Cultural Centre)
B3	Island platform, doors will open on the right
B3	Platform 1	Blue towards Lak Song (Phetchaburi)

== Nearby attractions ==
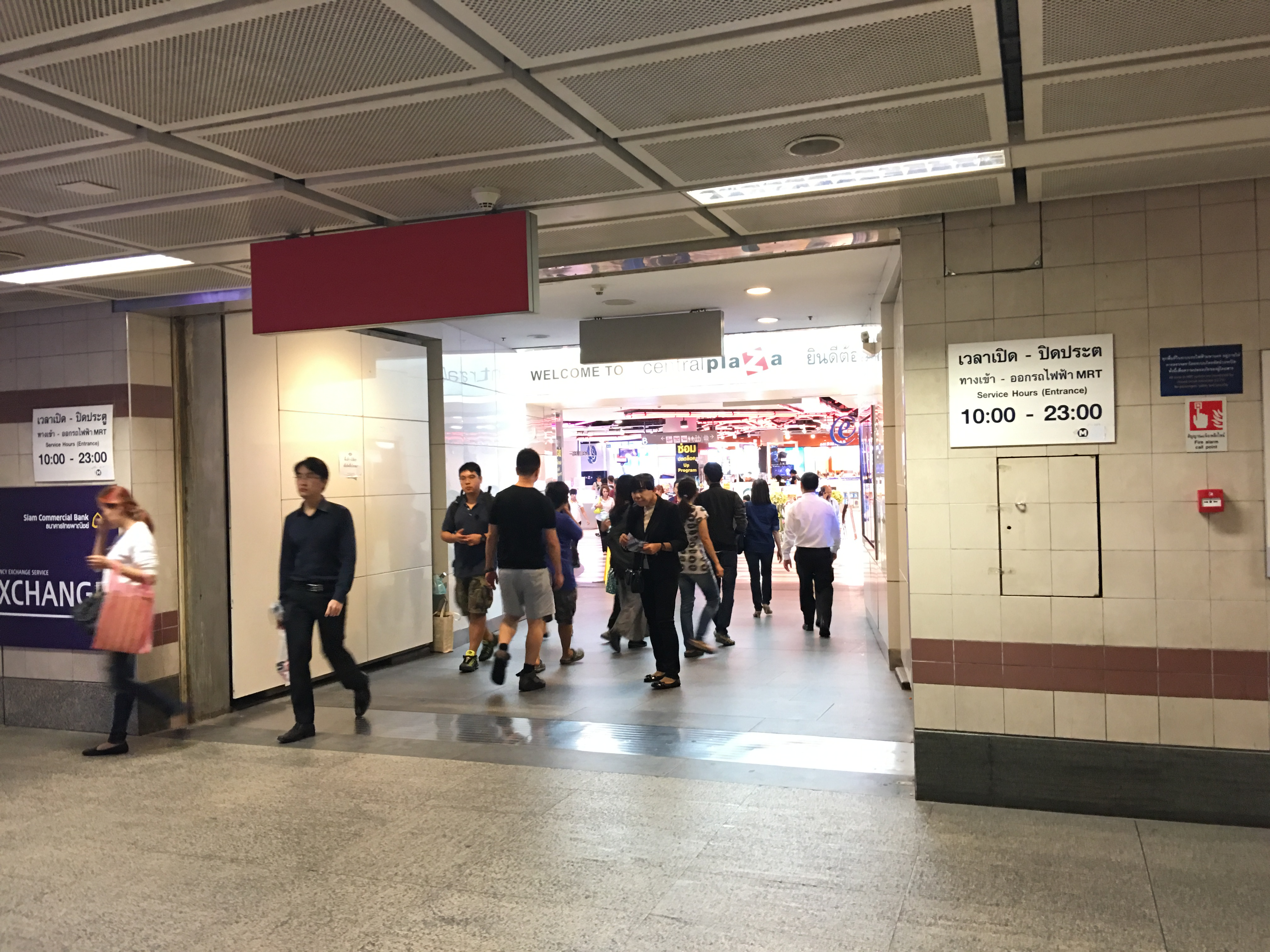
Underground walkway to B floor of Central Rama 9

- Central Rama 9
- Fortune Town
