= Central GR9 =

Central GR9 เซ็นทรัล จีอาร์ 9
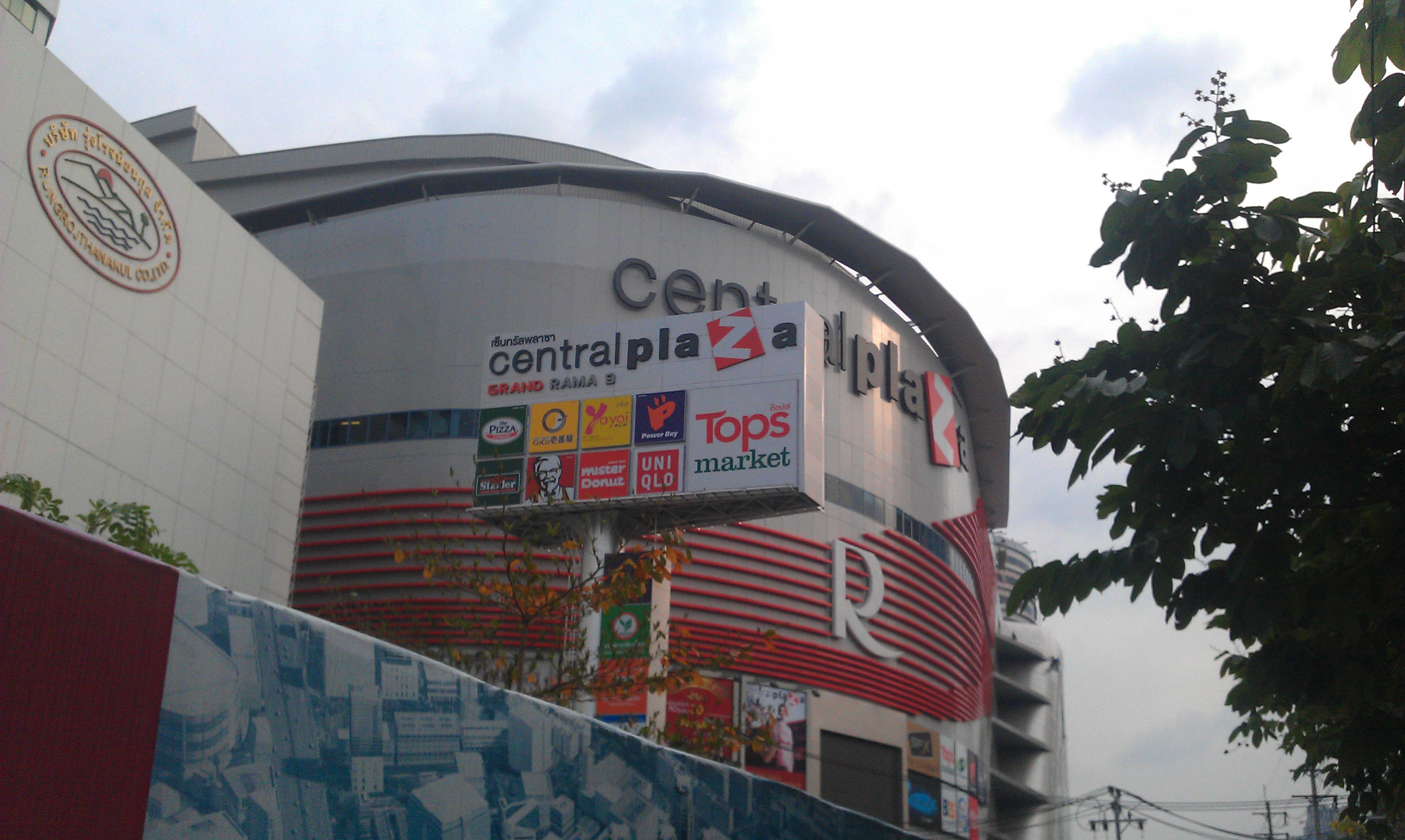
- Location: Huai Khwang, Bangkok, Thailand
- Coordinates: 13.758357°N 100.566093°E
- Address: 9/9 Rama IX Road
- Opened: December 14, 2011
- Developer: Central Pattana
- Manager: Olarn Vaiudomvut
- Owner: Central Pattana
- Num. of stores: 184
- Num. of anchor tenants: 7
- Floor area: 84,697 square metres (911,670 sq ft)
- Floors: 7 storeys, 2 underground
- Parking: 2,400
- Website: shoppingcenter.centralpattana.co.th/th/branch/central-rama-9

Central GR9 (Thai: เซ็นทรัล จีอาร์ไนน์; previously known as CentralPlaza Grand Rama 9) is a shopping mall on Rama IX Road in Huai Khwang District, Bangkok. and Opposite Lotus's and Fortune Town Rama IX. It has an underground tunnel connecting the shopping mall to Phra Ram 9 MRT station of the Blue Line.

== Overview ==
The shopping mall has a total of 9 storeys including 2 basement floors which provide direct connection to Phra Ram 9 MRT station. The anchor tenants include Robinson department store, SFX cinema, Tops Food Hall, SuperSports, B2S Think Space, PowerBuy and Harborland.

== Anchor ==
- Central The Store @ Rama 9 (Moved from Robinson Department Store Ratchadaphisek and operated as Robinson until 27 November 2025)
- Tops Food Hall
  - Tops Daily (Old FamilyMart)
- B2S
  - B2S Think Space
  - B2S (Basement floor)
- Power Buy
- Supersports
- Food Patio (Old Food Republic)
- Joyliday
- Harborland
- SFX Cinema 11 Cinemas
- Fitness First
- G Tower Rama 9
  - Officemate
  - 7-Eleven

== Incidents ==
On 19 September 2025, a woman fell from the 6th floor of the shopping mall.

== See also ==
- List of shopping malls in Thailand
