= Huai Khwang district =

Huai Khwang ห้วยขวาง
- Khet
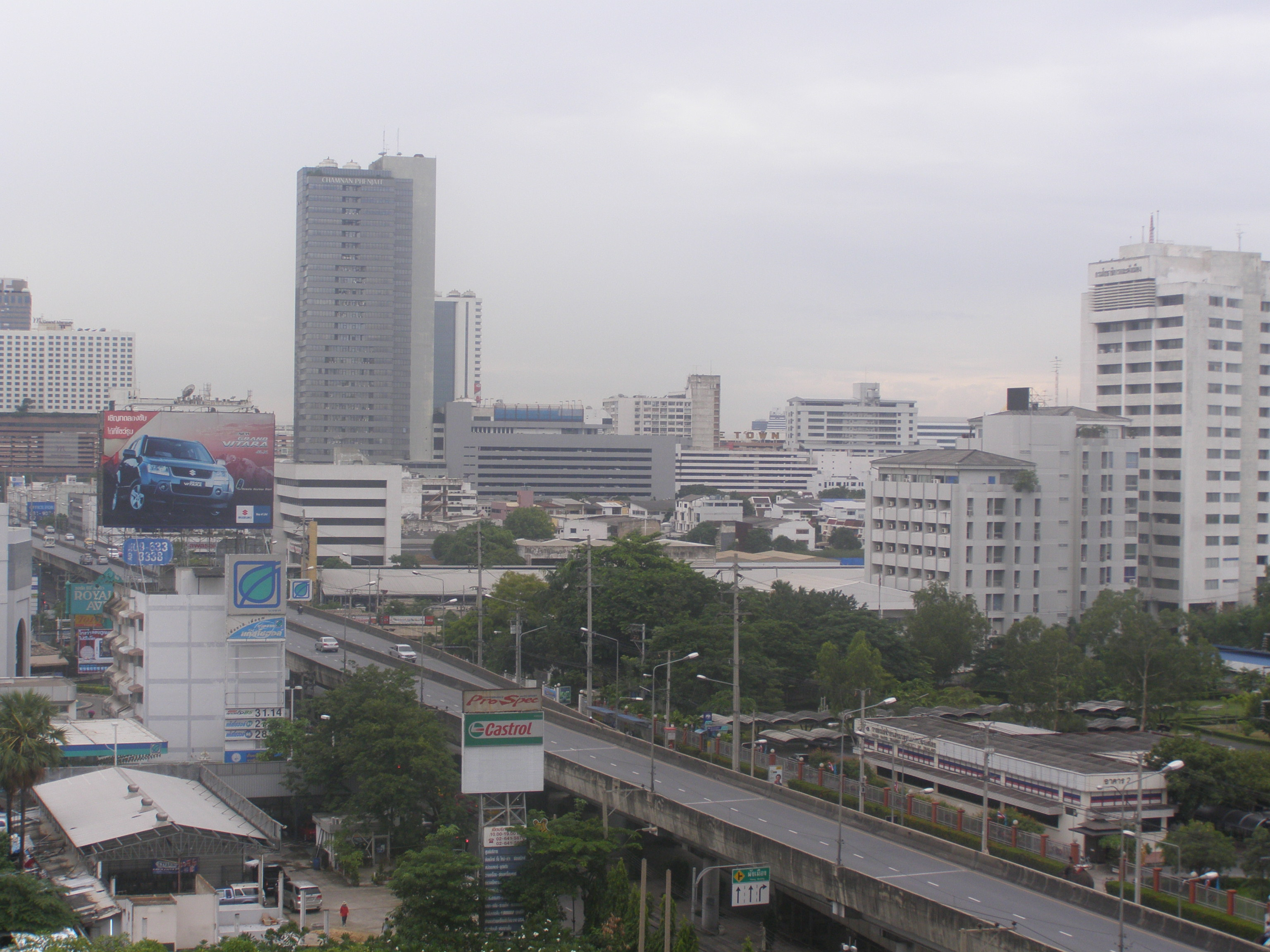
- Rama IX Road near Phang Muang Intersection

- Khet location in Bangkok
- Coordinates: 13°46′36″N 100°34′46″E
- Country: Thailand
- Province: Bangkok
- Seat: Huai Khwang
- Khwaeng: 3

Area
  - Total: 15.033 km^{2} (5.804 sq mi)

Population (2017)
  - Total: 81,515
  - Density: 5,422.4/km^{2} (14,044/sq mi)
- Time zone: UTC+7 (ICT)
- Postal code: 10310
- Geocode: 1017

Huai Khwang (Thai: ห้วยขวาง, pronounced [hûa̯j kʰwǎːŋ]) is one of the 50 districts (khet) of Bangkok, Thailand. It is east of the city centre. Neighbouring districts are Chatuchak, Wang Thonglang, Bang Kapi, Suan Luang, Watthana, Ratchathewi, and Din Daeng.

== History ==
Huai Khwang district was established in an area formerly part of Phaya Thai in 1973. Adjustments to the district were made in 1978, adjusting boundaries with neighboring districts Phaya Thai and Bang Kapi, and again in 1993, creating the new Din Daeng District.

The name "Huai Khwang" literally means "barricaded creek" (huai meaning creek, and khwang meaning barricaded), as the area was once made up of wetlands and small waterways; in the past, canals (also known as khlongs) were the primary means of transport.

Today, the district has become a popular destination for a new generation of Chinese immigrants, earning it the nickname "New Chinatown", to distinguish it from Bangkok's traditional Chinatown in Yaowarat, located in the Samphanthawong district.

In July 2026, officers at Huai Khwang Police Station were found to be wearing badges with dragon symbols without authorization for the past 3 to 4 years, leading to widespread social media criticism. Metropolitan Police Bureau 1 subsequently ordered all stations under its jurisdiction to remove the dragon-shaped shoulder badges from their uniforms.

== Administration ==
The district is divided into three sub-districts (khwaeng).

No.	Name	Thai	Area (km^{2})	Map
1.	Huai Khwang	ห้วยขวาง	5.342	Map
2.	Bang Kapi	บางกะปิ	5.408	Map
4.	Sam Sen Nok	สามเสนนอก	4.283	Map
Total			15.033	Map

The missing number 3 belongs to the sub-district which was split off to form Din Daeng district.

== Places ==
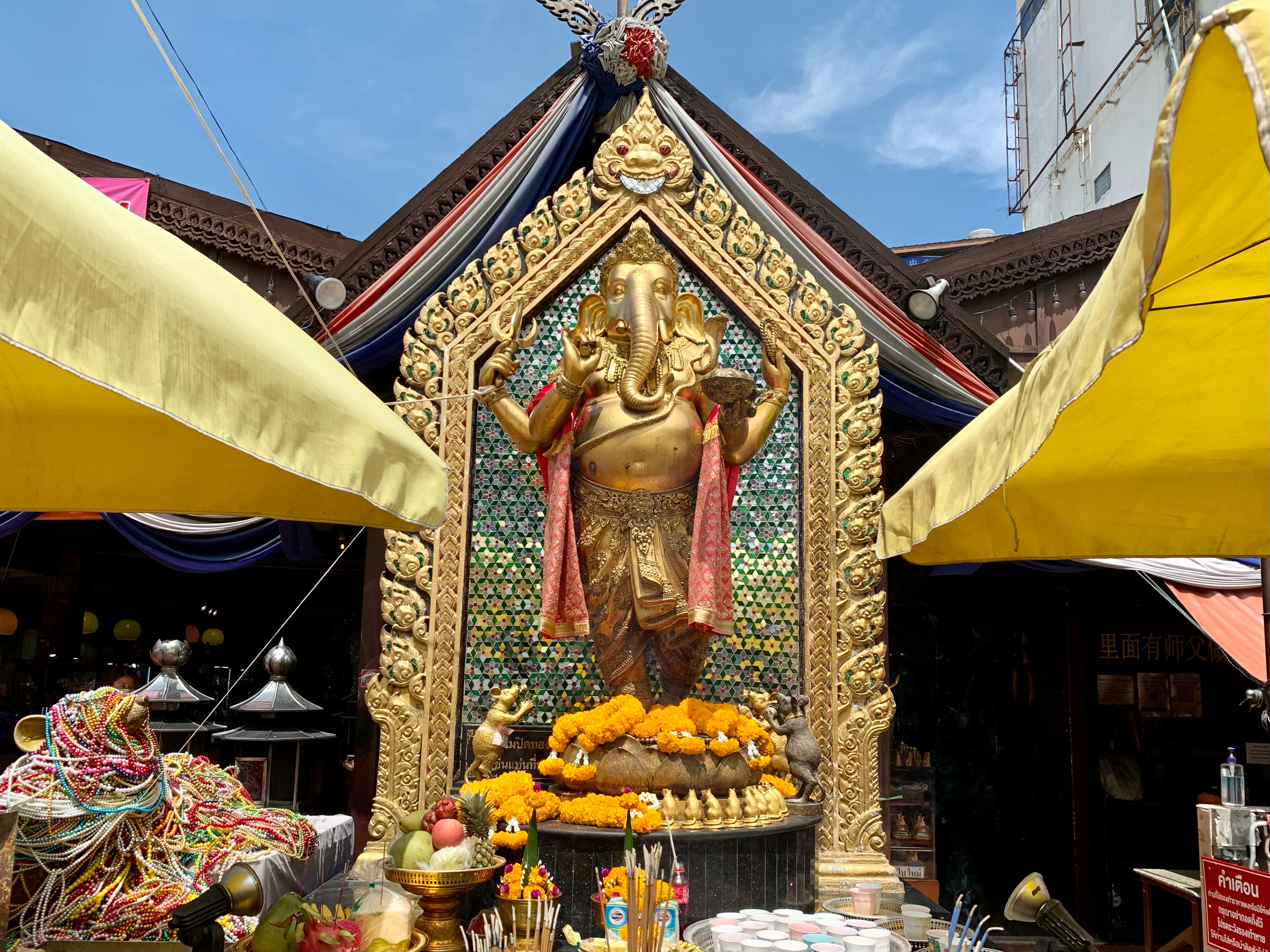
Ganesha Shrine at Huai Khwang Intersection (indeed, it is located in Din Daeng District)

- Thailand Cultural Centre (ศูนย์วัฒนธรรมแห่งประเทศไทย), a venue consisting of two auditoriums and one outdoor stage, used for live performances throughout the year. It was built with a grant from Japan, and opened on 9 October 1987. It can be reached via Thailand Cultural Centre MRT Station of the Blue Line.
- Ratchada Grand Theatre, the site of the Siam Niramit show.
- Royal City Avenue (RCA), a nightlife area.
- Central Rama 9
- The Esplanade, a shopping mall
- Ganesh Shrine, a shrine of Ganesha at the corner of Huai Khwang near the Huai Khwang MRT station, where many worship (it is just over the border in Din Daeng District).
- Praram 9 Hospital, a leading private hospital

== Rapid transit ==
- Blue Line has 6 stations in the district: Phetchaburi, Phra Ram 9, Thailand Cultural Centre, Huai Khwang, Sutthisan and Ratchadaphisek. The main depot of the Blue Line is also located in the district, covering an area of 0.48 square kilometres (120 acres).
- Yellow Line has a station in the district: Phawana
- The under-construction Orange Line will have 3 stations in the district: Thailand Cultural Centre (interchange with Blue Line), MRTA and Wat Phra Ram 9.

== Economy ==
Nok Mini (formerly SGA Airlines) has its headquarters in the district.

Thai Sky Airlines formerly had its head office in Room 708 of the 7th floor of the Le Concorde Tower in Huai Khwang District.

== Education ==
- KIS International School, Thai-Japanese Association School and Modulo Language School are in Huai Khwang District.
- Triamudomsuksapattanakarn Ratchada School
