= Sukhumvit MRT station =

Mass Rapid Transit station in Thailand

สุขุมวิท Sukhumvit
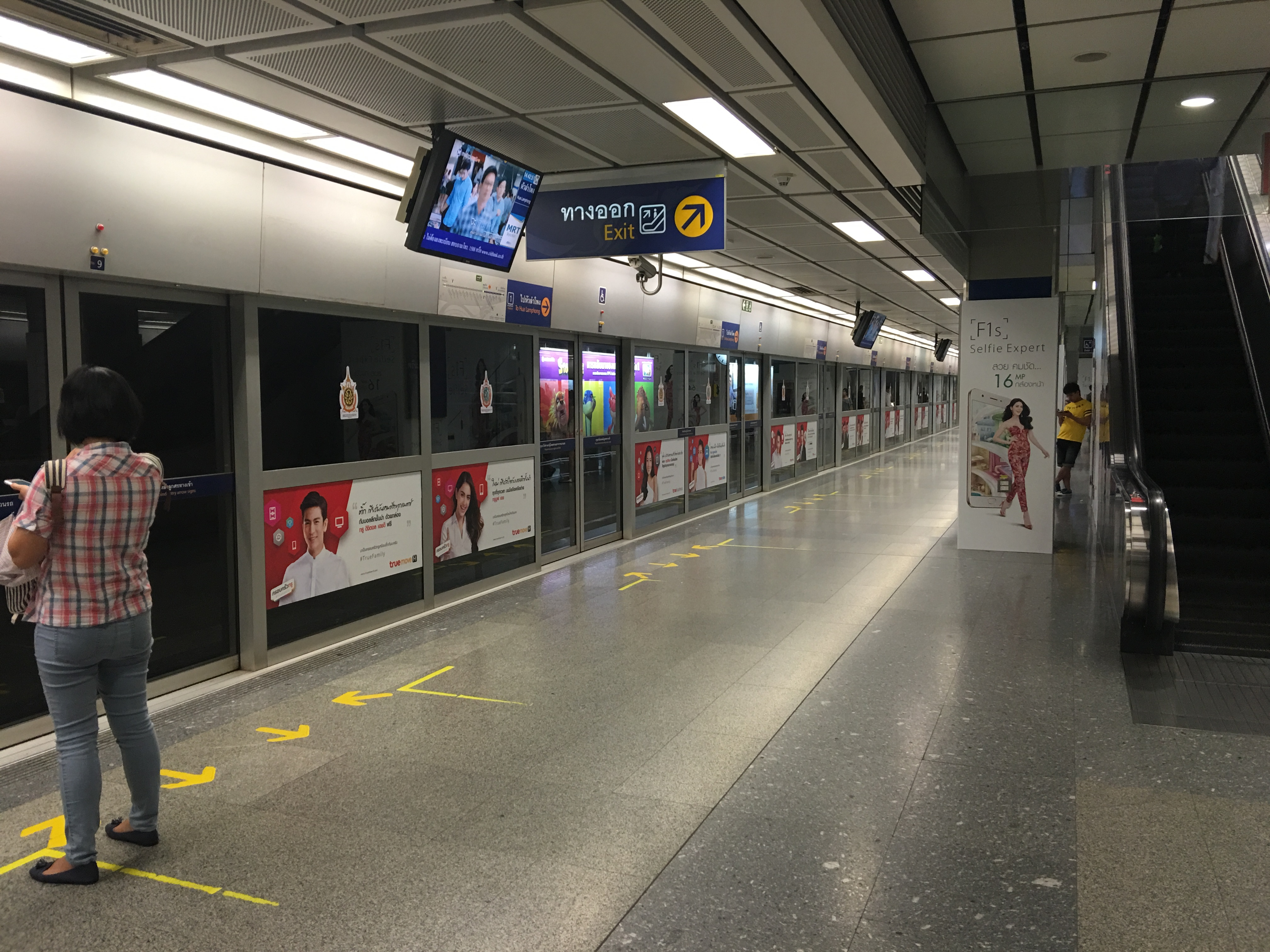

General information
- Location: Watthana, Thailand
- Coordinates: 13.738524°N 100.561446°E
- System: MRT
- Owner: Mass Rapid Transit Authority of Thailand (MRTA)
- Operator: Bangkok Expressway and Metro Public Company Limited (BEM)
- Line: MRT MRT Blue Line
- Platforms: 2 central platforms (3 exits, 3 elevators)
- Connections: BTS BTS Sukhumvit Line via Asok station

Construction
- Structure type: Underground

Other information
- Station code: BL22
- Website: BL22 Station

History
- Opened: 3 July 2004; 22 years ago

Passengers
- 2021: 9,627,729

Services
| Preceding station | Metropolitan Rapid Transit | Following station |
|---|---|---|
| QSNCC towards Lak Song | Blue Line | Phetchaburi towards Tha Phra via Bang Sue |
| Preceding station | BTS Skytrain | Following station |
| Nana towards Khu Khot | Sukhumvit Line transfer at Asok | Phrom Phong towards Kheha |
Location

Sukhumvit MRT station (Thai: สถานีสุขุมวิท, RTGS: Sathani Sukhumwit) is an MRT station on the Blue Line, located below Asok Intersection between Sukhumvit Road and Asok Montri Road in Bangkok, Thailand. The station provides an interchange with the BTS Sukhumvit Line. It is one of the busiest stations on the network.

The station has three underground levels including a shopping zone.

== Station layout ==
| FB; Footbridge | Skywalk | Footbridge to Asok Station |
| G At-grade | - | Bus stop |
| B1; Basement | Basement | Exits 1–3 and Underground Mall |
| B2; Concourse | Concourse | Ticket machines |
| B3; Platform | Platform 2 | Blue towards Tha Phra via Bang Sue (Phetchaburi) |
| B3; Platform | Island platform, doors will open on the right |
| B3; Platform | Platform 1 | Blue towards Lak Song (QSNCC) |

== Nearby attractions ==
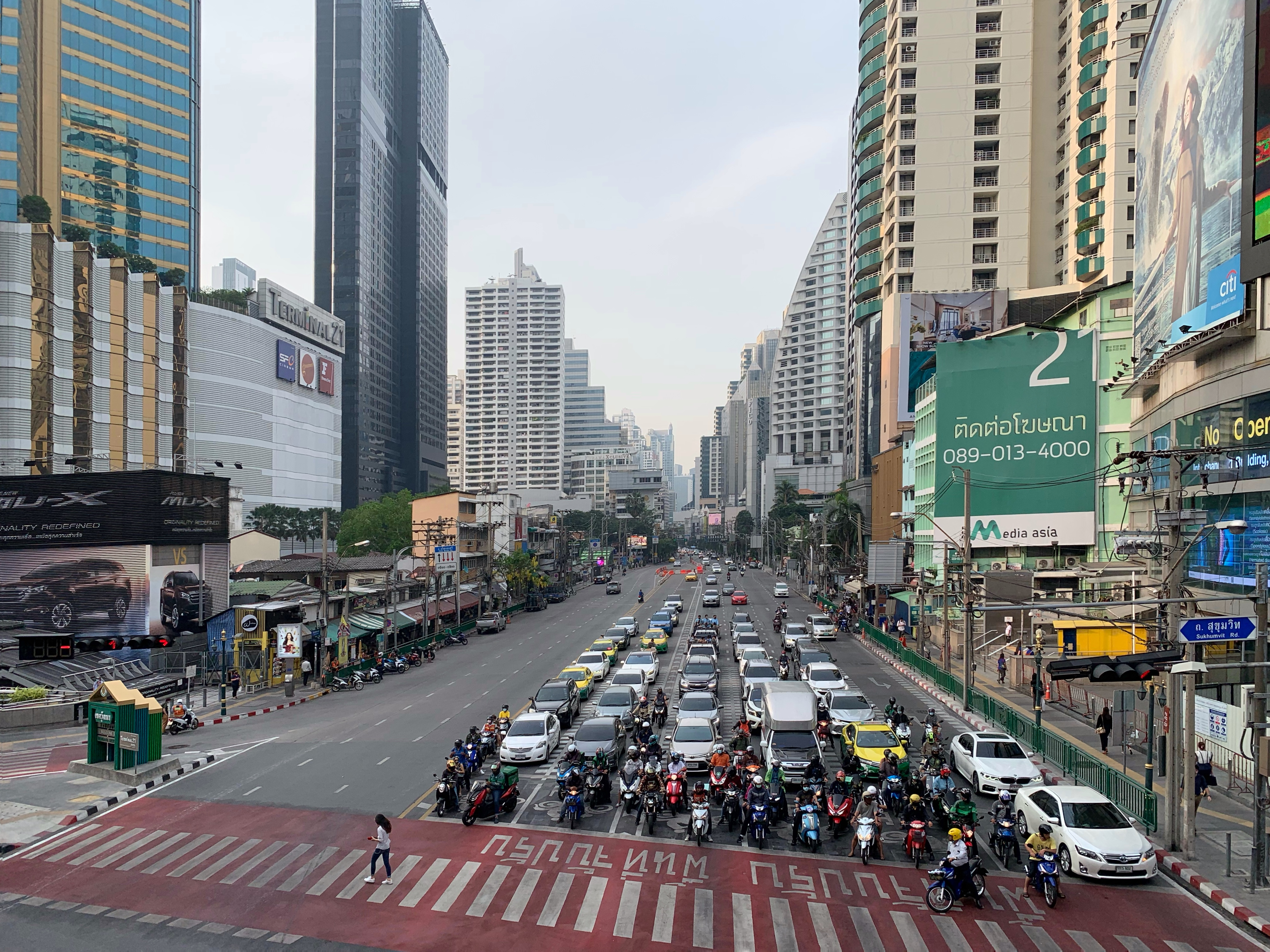
Beginning of Thanon Asok Montri at Thanon Sukhumvit crossing, above MRT line seen towards north. Grand Millenium building on the right, Terminal 21 on the left

- Siam Society
- Soi Cowboy
- Embassy of India
- Srinakharinwirot University
- Benchakitti Park

=== Department stores ===
- Robinson
- Timesquare
- Sukhumvit Plaza
- Foodland Supermarket
- Terminal 21

=== Offices ===
- Interchange 21 Tower
- Exchange Tower
- GMM Grammy Place
- BB Tower

=== Hotels ===
- Sheraton Grande Sukhumvit Hotel
