= Asok Montri Road =

Street in Bangkok, Thailand

Coordinates: 13°44′33.35″N 100°33′45.61″E

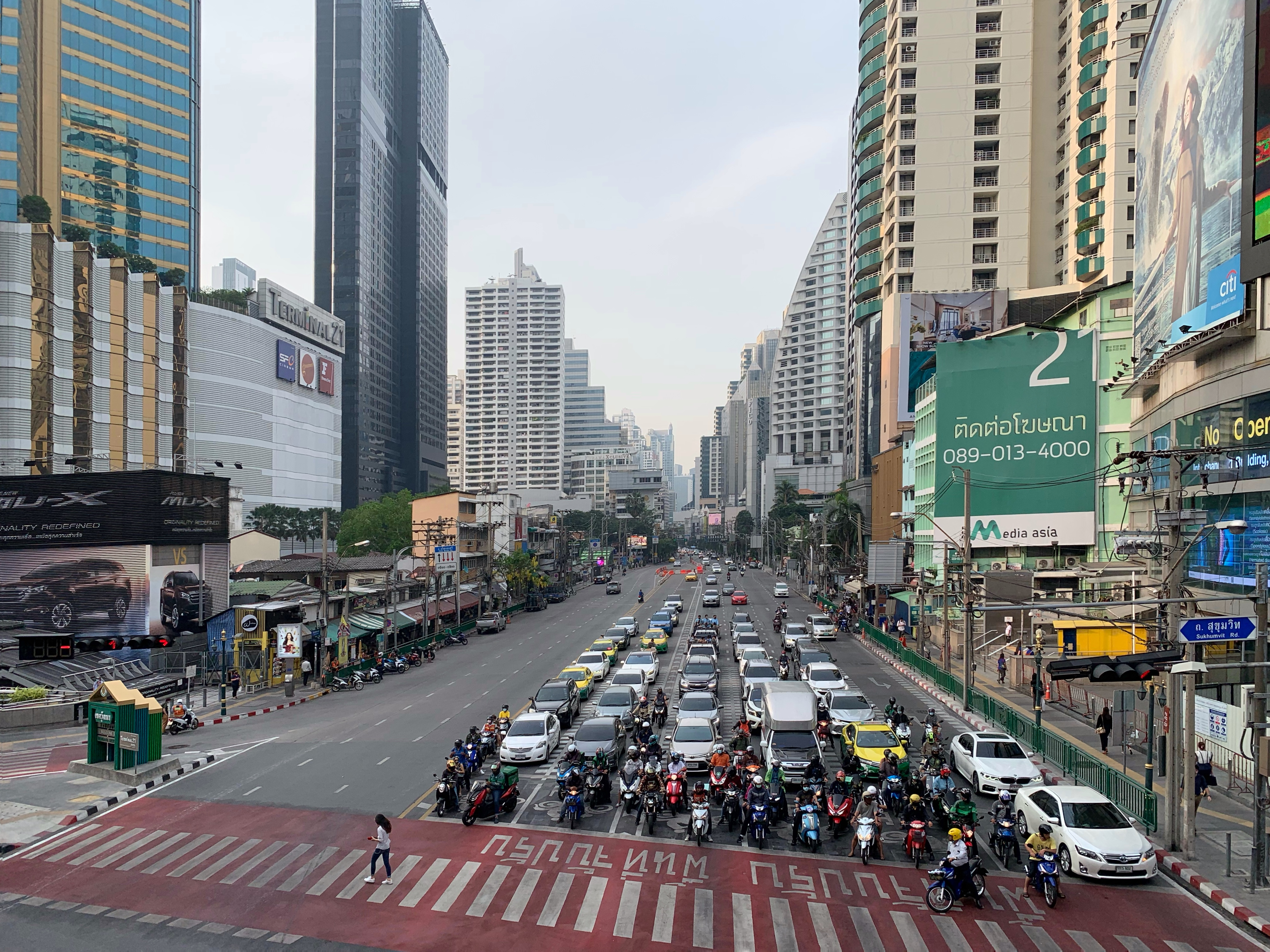
Asok Montri Road at Asok Intersection

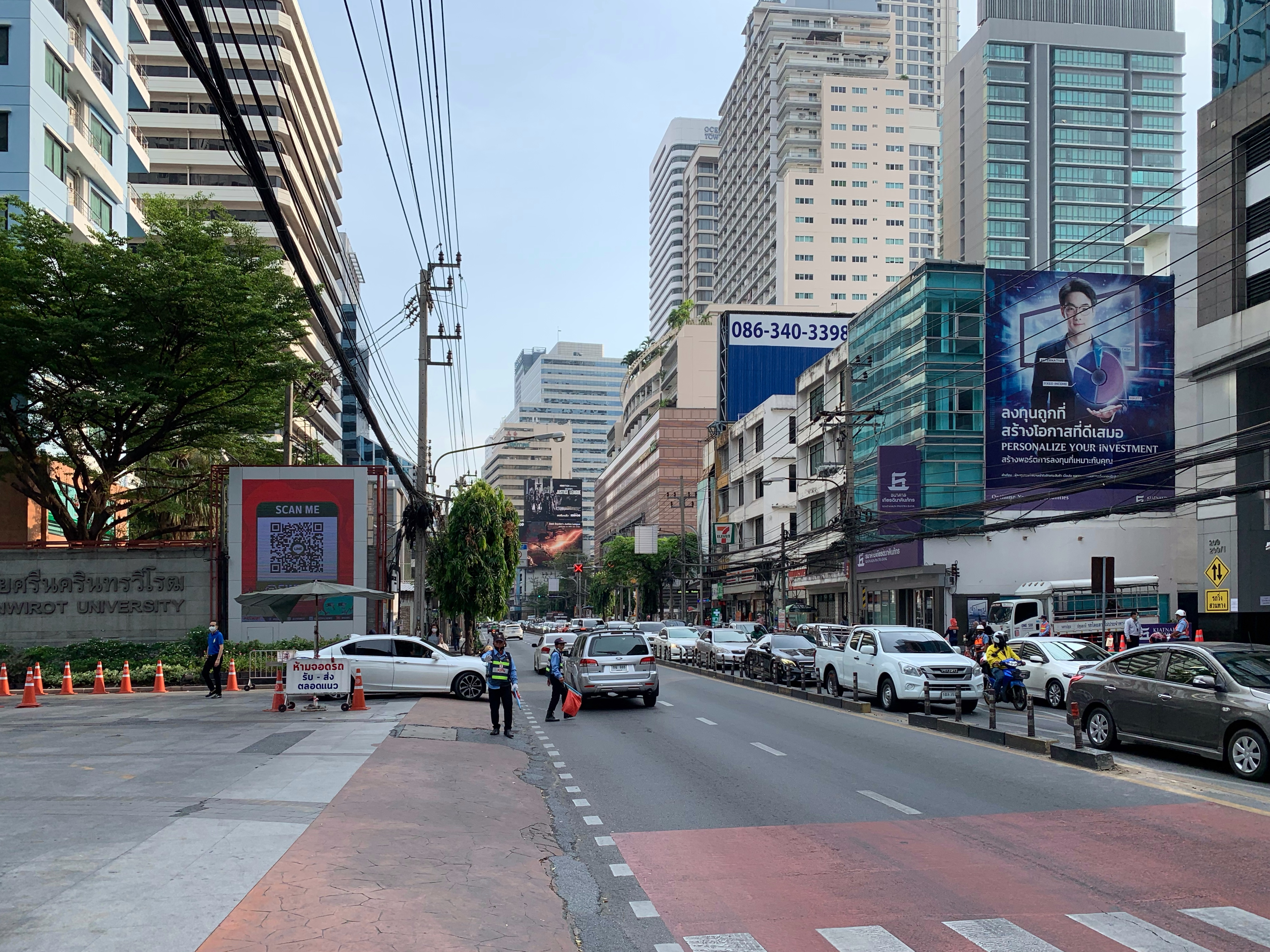
Asok Montri Road at Srinakharinwirot University Prasarnmitr

Asok Montri Road, or Soi Sukhumvit 21 (also Asoke Montri Road, Thai: ถนนอโศกมนตรี, RTGS: Thanon Asok Montri, pronounced [tʰā.nǒn ʔā.sòːk mōn.trīː]), is a major road in Bangkok, Thailand. It is often referred to as simply Asok or Asoke. It runs north from Sukhuvmit Road and forms part of the Ratchadaphisek inner ring road. It contains many offices buildings and shops. Although the road has a capacity of 35,000, more than 100,000 vehicles use the road daily, causing major congestion. The junction of Sukhuvmit Road and Asok Montri Road is a major road junction known as Asok Intersection, and is also the location of Asok BTS station and Sukhumvit MRT station. In 2013 there were plans to build an elevated highway but as of 2019 construction has not started.
