= Charansanitwong railway halt =

Railway stop in Bang Khun Non, Thailand

Charansanitwong จรัลสนิทวงศ์
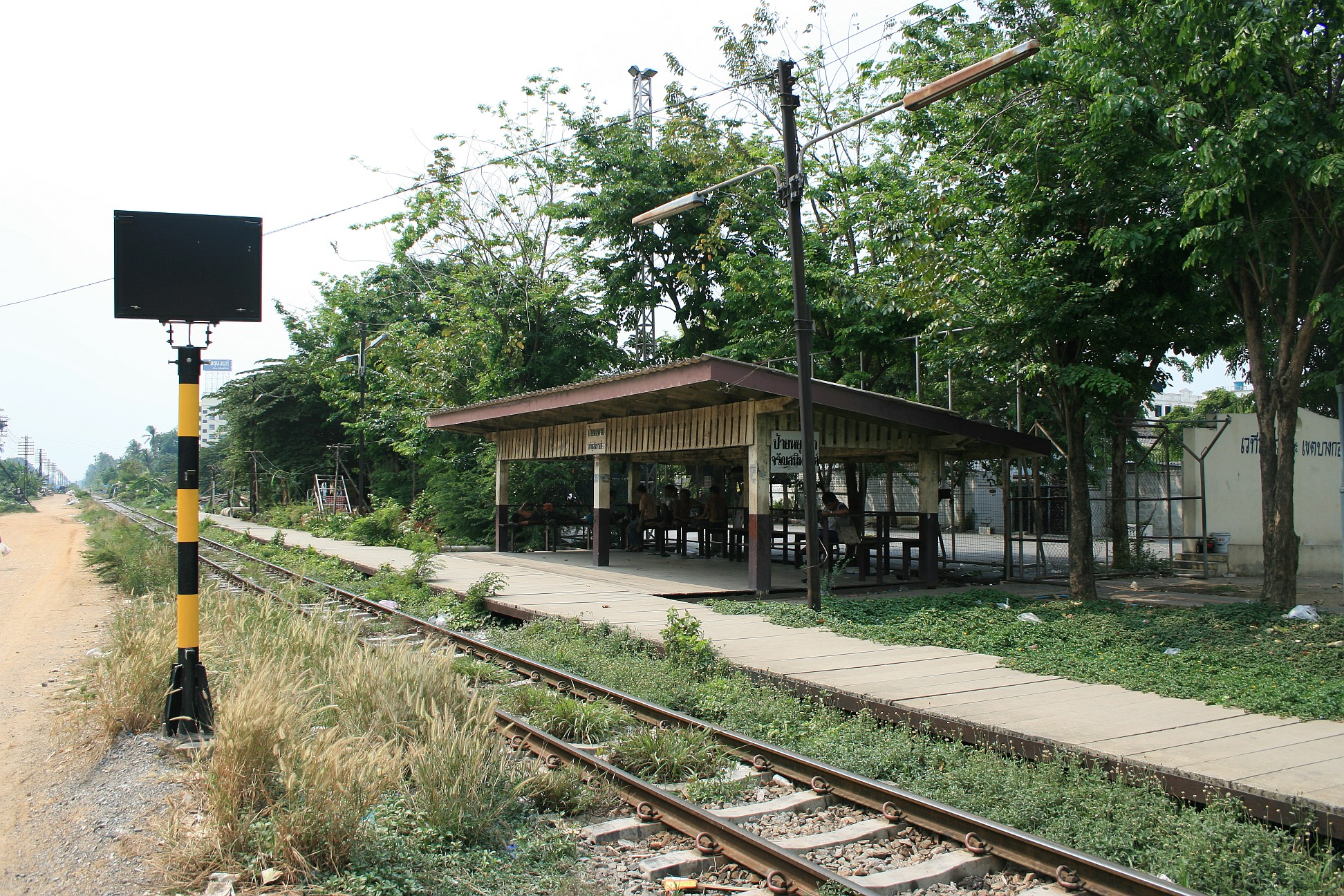

General information
- Location: Bang Khun Non subdistrict, Bangkok Noi district Bangkok; Thailand
- Coordinates: 13.763094°N 100.472669°E
- Operator: State Railway of Thailand
- Manager: Ministry of Transport
- Line: Thon Buri Line
- Distance: 1.54 km (1.0 mi) from Thon Buri
- Platforms: 1
- Tracks: 1
- Connections: Bang Khun Non

Construction
- Structure type: At-grade

Other information
- Station code: รว.
- Classification: Halt

Services
Preceding station	State Railway of Thailand	Following station
Thon Buri Terminus	Southern Line Thon Buri Line	Bang Ramat Halt towards Taling Chan
Location

Charansanitwong railway halt (Thai: ที่หยุดรถไฟจรัลสนิทวงศ์) is a railway stop located in Bang Khun Non subdistrict, Bangkok Noi District, Bangkok. It is situated 1.54 km (1.0 mi) from Thon Buri railway station. The Thai name of the station utilizes the historical spelling of Charan Sanit Wong Road.

== Interchange ==
The halt is a transit point for passengers transferring to the Bang Khun Non MRT station on the MRT Blue Line. Under current development plans, the site is being expanded into a major interchange hub that will eventually connect four lines:

- SRT Southern Line
- MRT Blue Line
- MRT Orange Line (under construction)
- SRT Light Red Line (Taling Chan–Siriraj branch, planned)
