= Thailand Cultural Centre MRT station =

Bangkok MRT station on the Blue Line

Coordinates: 13.7661°N 100.5700°E

ศูนย์วัฒนธรรมแห่งประเทศไทย Thailand Cultural Centre
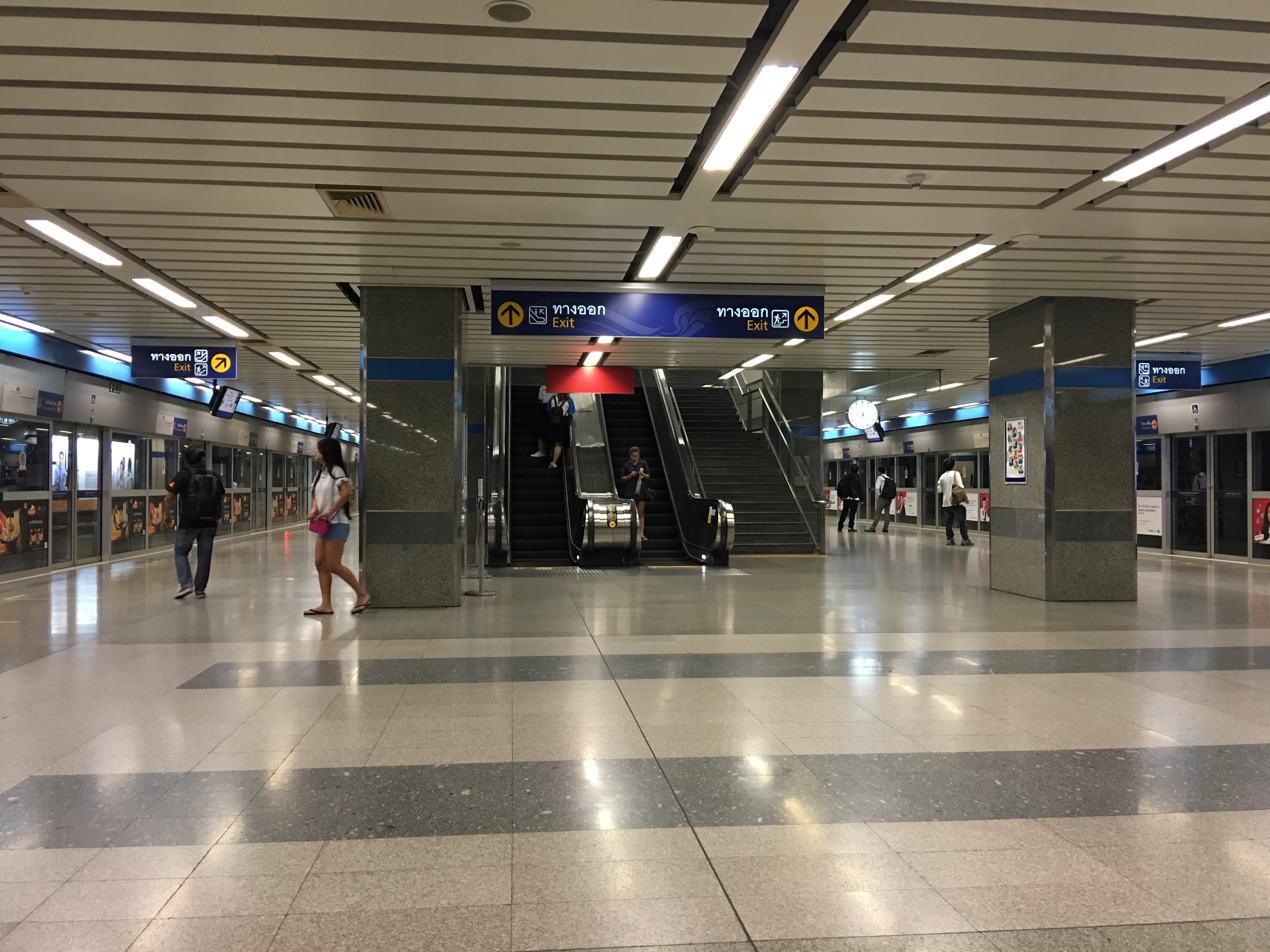
- Blue Line platforms

General information
- Location: Din Daeng and Huai Khwang, Bangkok, Thailand
- System: MRT MRT
- Owner: Mass Rapid Transit Authority of Thailand (MRTA)
- Operator: Bangkok Expressway and Metro Public Company Limited (BEM)
- Lines: MRT MRT Blue Line; MRT MRT Orange Line (future)
- Platforms: 1 island platform 2 side platforms (under construction)
- Tracks: 4 (2 in operation and 2 under construction)

Construction
- Structure type: Underground
- Accessible: yes

Other information
- Station code: BL19; OR13

History
- Opened: 3 July 2004; 22 years ago
- Former names: Thiam Ruam Mit

Passengers
- 2021: 4,103,960

Services
Preceding station	Metropolitan Rapid Transit	Following station
Phra Ram 9 towards Lak Song	Blue Line	Huai Khwang towards Tha Phra via Bang Sue
Under construction
Pracha Songkhro towards Taling Chan	Orange Line	MRTA towards Yaek Rom Klao
Location

Thailand Cultural Centre MRT station (Thai: สถานีศูนย์วัฒนธรรมแห่งประเทศไทย, RTGS: Sathani Sun Watthanatham Haeng Prathet Thai, code BL19) is a Bangkok MRT station on the Blue Line in Bangkok, Thailand. It is located under Ratchadaphisek Road, near Thailand Cultural Centre and Stock Exchange of Thailand and the MRT depot. During construction, the station had been named Thiam Ruam Mit (เทียมร่วมมิตร).

The under-construction MRT Orange Line will interchange with Blue Line at this station. The Orange Line segment eastbound from the station is planned to open in 2028. And the Orange Line segment westbound from the station is planned to open in July 2030.

== Station layout ==
G	-	Bus stop, Thailand Cultural Centre, The Street Ratchada
B1	Concourse	Exits 1–3, ticket machines
B2 (Under construction)	Concourse	Orange Line platforms
B3	Platform 2	Blue towards Tha Phra via Bang Sue (Huai Khwang)
B3	Island platform, doors will open on the right
B3	Platform 1	Blue towards Lak Song (Phra Ram 9)

== Station details ==
The station uses symbol as color blue. It is an underground station, 27 metres (89 ft) in width, 358 metres (1,175 ft) in length, and 20 metres (66 ft) in depth, and uses an island platform.

There are MetroMall in the station, but not opened yet.

== Future ==
The under-construction MRT Orange line will interchange with MRT Blue Line at Thailand Cultural Centre station. The first stage of the Orange line will begin at Thailand Cultural Centre station and run eastward to Yaek Rom Klao. In 2020, cabinet approved the extension of Orange line from Thailand Cultural Centre westward to Bang Khun Non MRT station.

== Incidents ==
=== Train collision ===
On 17 January 2005, just after 09:15, an empty train returning to the depot collided with a peak-hour train filled with passengers at the Thailand Cultural Centre station. 140 people were hurt, most of whom sustained only minor injuries, and the entire Metro network was shut down for two weeks.

After initial investigations, it was found that the empty train had run into problems shortly before the accident, grinding to a halt on a curve leading to the depot. The driver applied its brake and was waiting to be towed to the maintenance center close to Thailand Cultural Centre station.

A rescue train was attempting to connect to the stalled train when the driver was told to release the brake while coupling had not yet been successful. It was then that the empty train began to roll backwards at a speed of 10 metres per second (33 ft/s), before smashing into the other train, which was carrying passengers. Therefore, it was believed that the incident was caused by negligence due to insufficient training of operation staff. This accident also resulted in two damaged trains with heavily damaged areas limited to the two leading cars. The colliding speed was suspected to be about 60 km/h due to the appearance of damaged areas. However, one train, which was rebuilt from the repair of the minor-damaged cars, was already fitted for operation at the end of 2006 and the remaining one was still under heavy repair until mid of 2007; it was put into service in October, 2007. The cost resulting from the accident might be a much higher figure than BMCL quoted, and it was expected to be at least 400 million baht, which was totally insured by a local insurance company.

The Metro resumed full operation on 1 February 2005, and passenger numbers soon rose back to pre-crash levels, partly due to a temporary promotional fare scheme which allowed passengers to travel any distance on the MRT for only ten baht (~0.33 USD).

=== Flood ===
On the evening of 5 September 2025, the station got flooded due to a construction of a walkway between the station and AIA Connect, a nearby office building owned by AIA Group. The station's operation have resumed as normal by the following day.
