= Siriraj station =

Planned railway station in Bangkok, Thailand

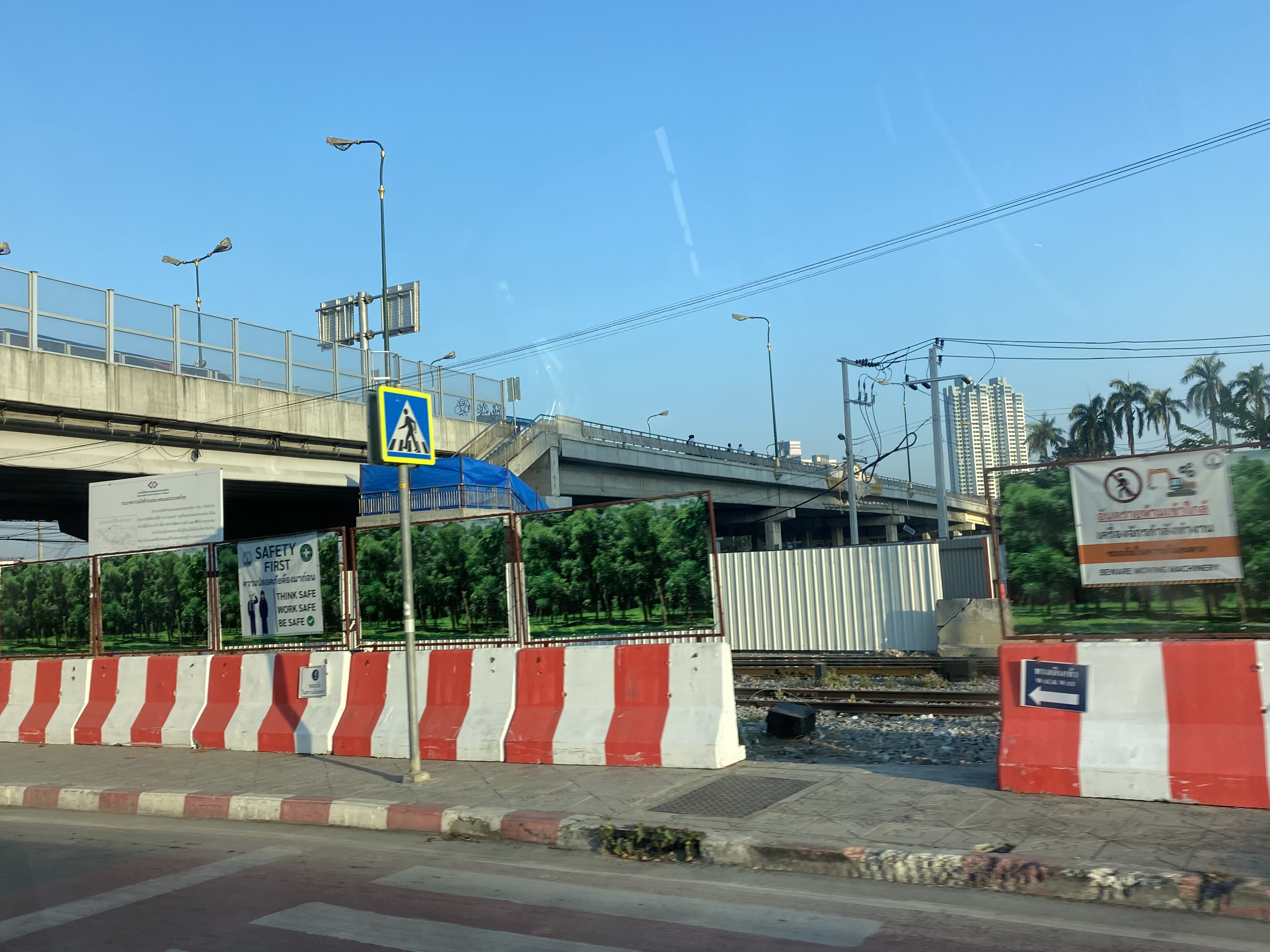
- Construction site in January 2025

General information
- Location: Bangkok Noi, Bangkok, Thailand
- System: MRT
- Owner: Mass Rapid Transit Authority of Thailand (MRTA)
- Operator: Bangkok Expressway and Metro Public Company Limited (BEM)
- Line: MRT MRT Orange Line

Other information
- Station code: OR03

History
- Opening: 2030

Services
Preceding station	Metropolitan Rapid Transit	Following station
Under construction
Bang Khun Non towards Taling Chan	Orange Line	Sanam Luang towards Yaek Rom Klao
Location

Siriraj station / Thon Buri–Siriraj station (Thai: สถานีศิริราช / สถานีธนบุรี-ศิริราช) is an under-construction railway and rapid transit station that will serve the Orange Line of the MRT and the commuter Light Red Line. It is planned as part of an integrated structure that will also serve as a hospital building of Siriraj Hospital.

The underground Siriraj station will be part of the Orange Line's western section, and is expected to open in 2030. The Thon Buri–Siriraj station will be a terminus of the Taling Chan–Siriraj section of the Red Line.

In 2025, workers at the site discovered a more than 70 human skeletons believed to be victims of executions during the Thonburi Kingdom.
