= MRT (Bangkok) =

Thai rapid transit system

Metropolitan Rapid Transit

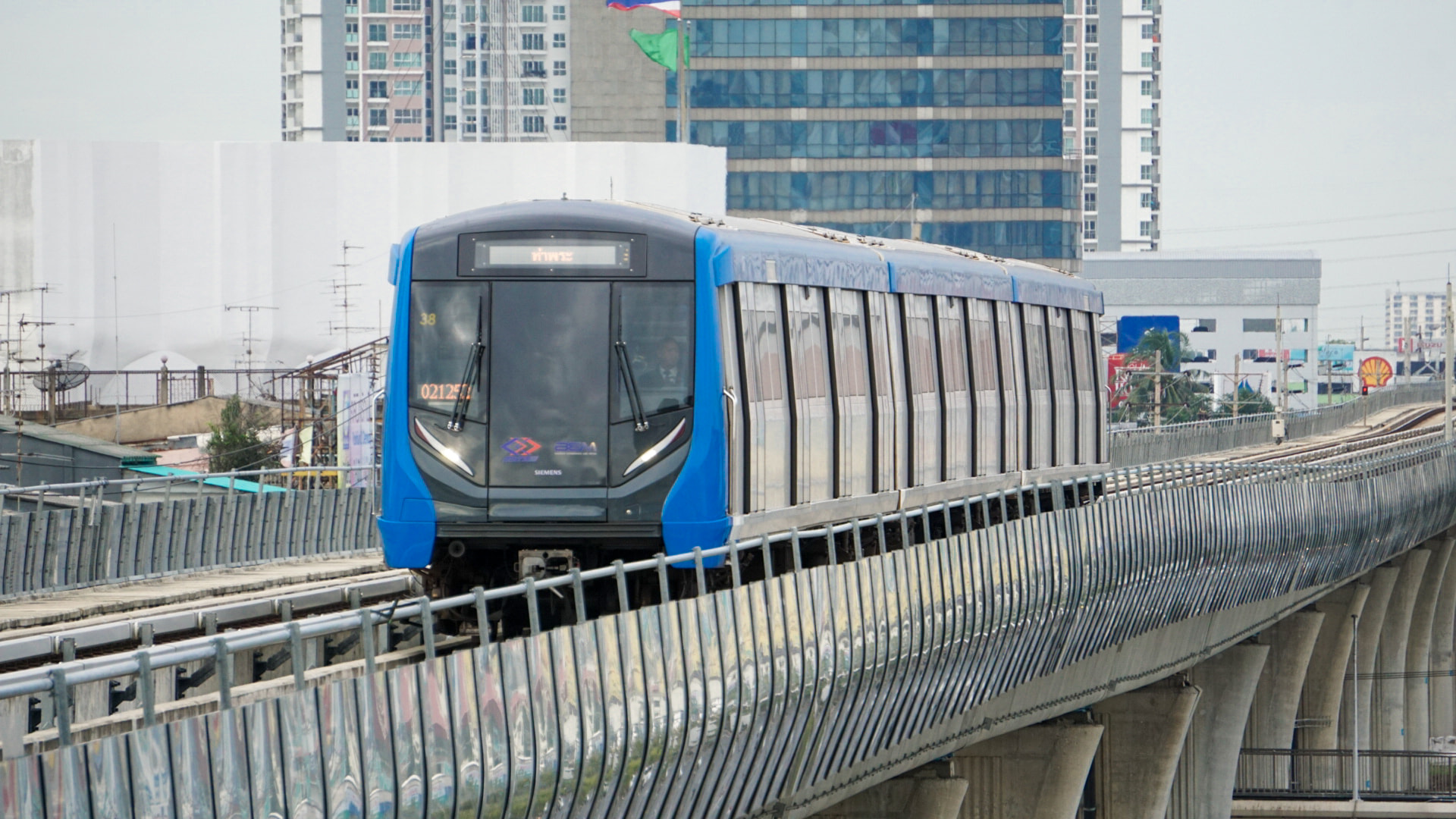
- The second generation Siemens Modular Metro train (EMU-BLE) of the Blue Line

Overview
- Native name: รถไฟฟ้ามหานคร
- Owner: Mass Rapid Transit Authority of Thailand
- Locale: Bangkok Metropolitan Region
- Transit type: Light metro Monorail
- Number of lines: 4 in operation 1 under construction 1 under planning
- Number of stations: 107
- Daily ridership: 582,453 (2024)
- Annual ridership: 213,177,910 (2024)

Operation
- Began operation: 3 July 2004; 22 years ago
- Operators: MRT MRT; Bangkok Expressway and Metro MRT MRT; Eastern Bangkok Monorail Company Limited and Northern Bangkok Monorail Company Limited (Subsidiary of BSR Consortium)
- Number of vehicles: MRT; 19 three-car trains (Siemens Modular Metro EMU-IBL); 35 three-car trains (Siemens Modular Metro EMU-BLE); MRT; 21 three-car trains (J-TREC sustina); MRT; 30 four-car trains (Alstom Innovia Monorail 300 YM-EMU); MRT; 42 four-car trains (Alstom Innovia Monorail 300 YM-EMU)

Technical
- System length: 133 kilometres (83 mi) (operational); 171.63 kilometres (106.65 mi) (planned); 304.63 kilometres (189.29 mi) (total)
- Track gauge: 1,435 mm (4 ft 8 1/2 in) standard gauge
- Electrification: 750 V DC third rail
- Top speed: 80 km/h (50 mph)

The Metropolitan Rapid Transit or MRT is a medium-capacity rapid transit system serving the Bangkok Metropolitan Region in Thailand. The MRT system comprises two fully operational rapid transit lines (Blue and Purple) and two fully operational monorail lines (Yellow and Pink), with another rapid transit line (Orange) under construction. The MRT Blue Line, officially the Chaloem Ratchamongkhon Line, between Hua Lamphong and Bang Sue was the first to open in July 2004 as Bangkok's second metro system. The MRT Blue line is officially known in Thai as rotfaifa mahanakhon (รถไฟฟ้ามหานคร) or "metropolitan SkyTrain", but it is more commonly called rotfai taidin (รถไฟใต้ดิน), literally, "underground train" as it was distinguished from the BTS Skytrain by being completely underground when its first section between Hua Lamphong to Bang Sue opened.

The second MRT line MRT Purple Line, officially the Chalong Ratchadham Line, opened on 6 August 2016 and connected Tao Poon with Khlong Bang Phai in Nonthaburi in the northwest of Greater Bangkok. It was the first mass transit line to extend outside Bangkok.

Both the Blue Line and Purple Line are operated by the Bangkok Expressway and Metro Public Company Limited (BEM) under a concession granted by the Mass Rapid Transit Authority of Thailand (MRTA), which is the owner of the MRT lines. Along with the BTS Skytrain and the Airport Rail Link, the MRT is part of Bangkok's rail transportation infrastructure. The BEM-operated MRT lines have 526,000 passengers each day as of August 2024 (Blue Line 453,000 and Purple Line 73,000) with 54 operational stations and a combined route length of 71 kilometers (44 mi). Construction began in mid-2011 to extend the MRT Blue Line, after completion in April 2020, the Blue Line has become a quasi loop line (providing interchange with itself at Tha Phra) around the centre of Bangkok.

The MRT Yellow Line monorail, officially the Nakkhara Phiphat Line, opened for trial operation in June 2023 and was fully opened on 3 July 2023. The MRT Pink Line monorail opened for public trial operation in November 2023, and was fully opened on 1 February 2024. The Yellow and Pink Lines are operated by subsidiaries of BTSC, who also operate the BTS Skytrain rather than BEM.

Other MRT lines are planned for the future MRT system with the MRT Orange Line and the southern extension of the MRT Purple Line from Tao Poon to Rat Burana are under construction. The MRT Brown Line is also planned.

== History ==
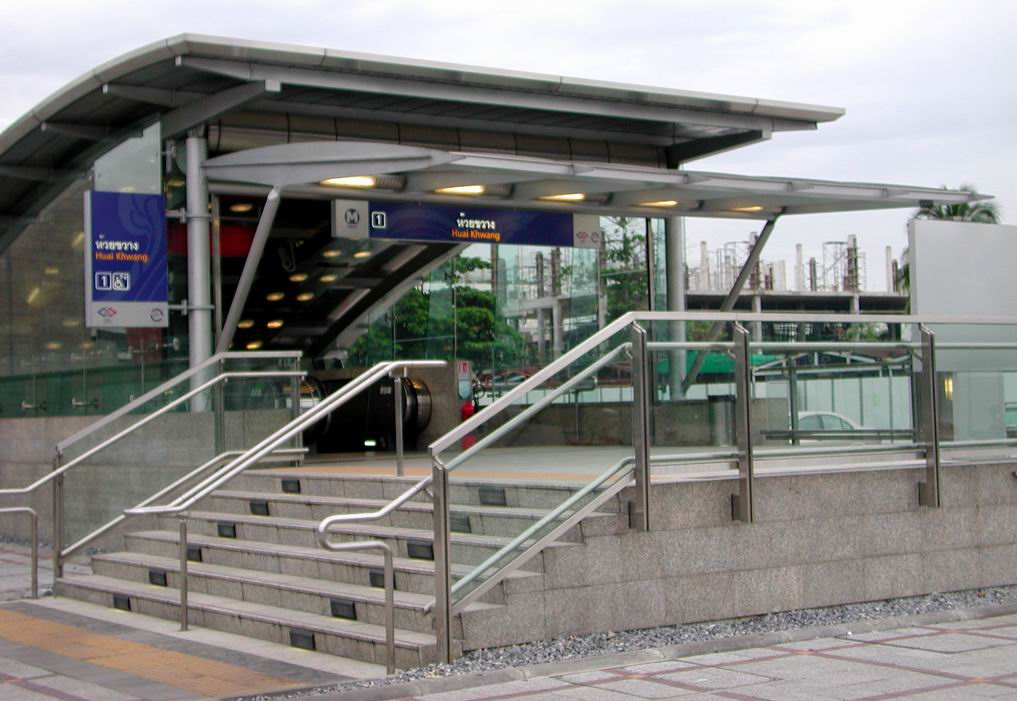
The entrance to Huai Khwang MRT station

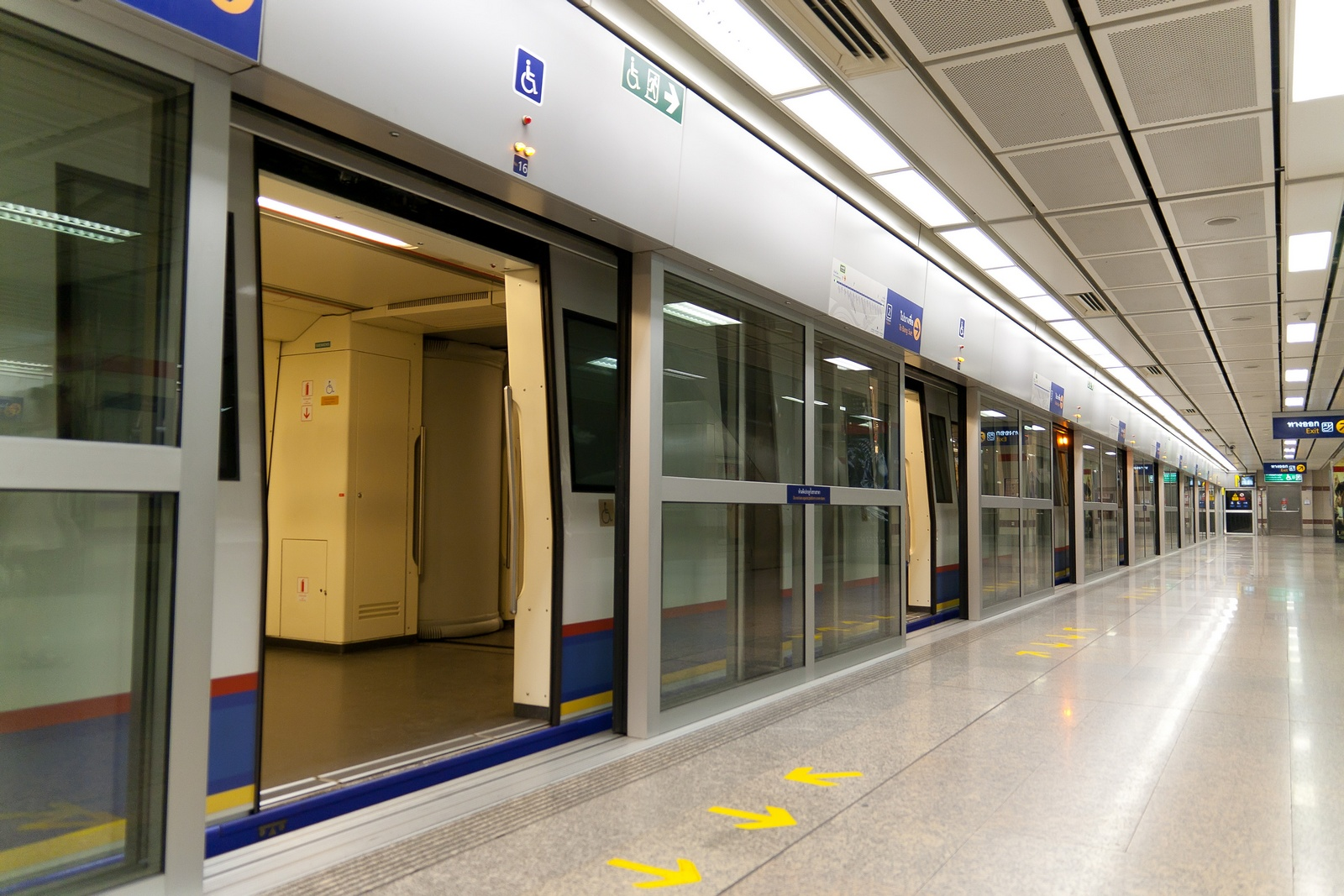
Platform screen doors are installed at all stations

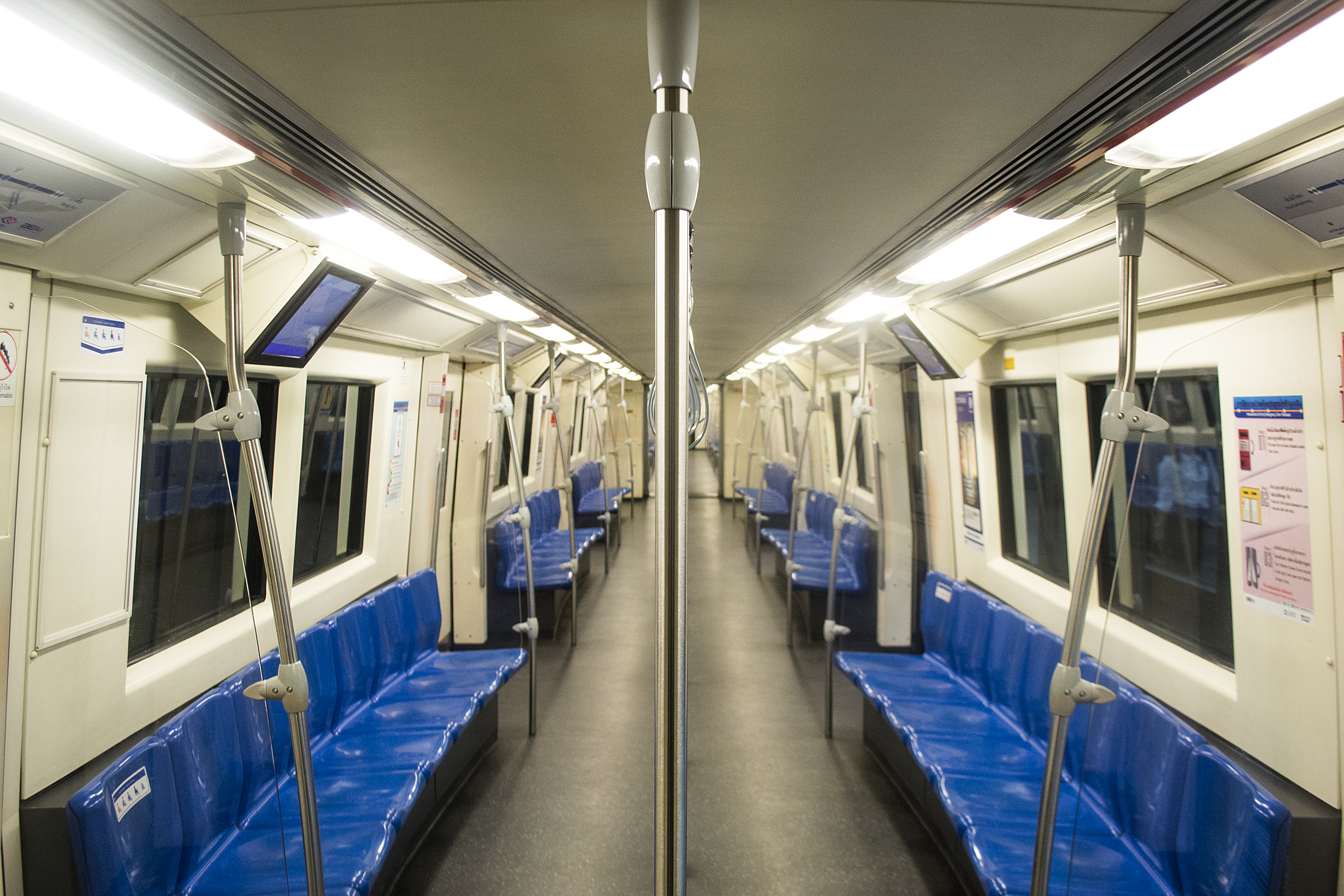
Interior of a Blue Line Siemens Modular Metro

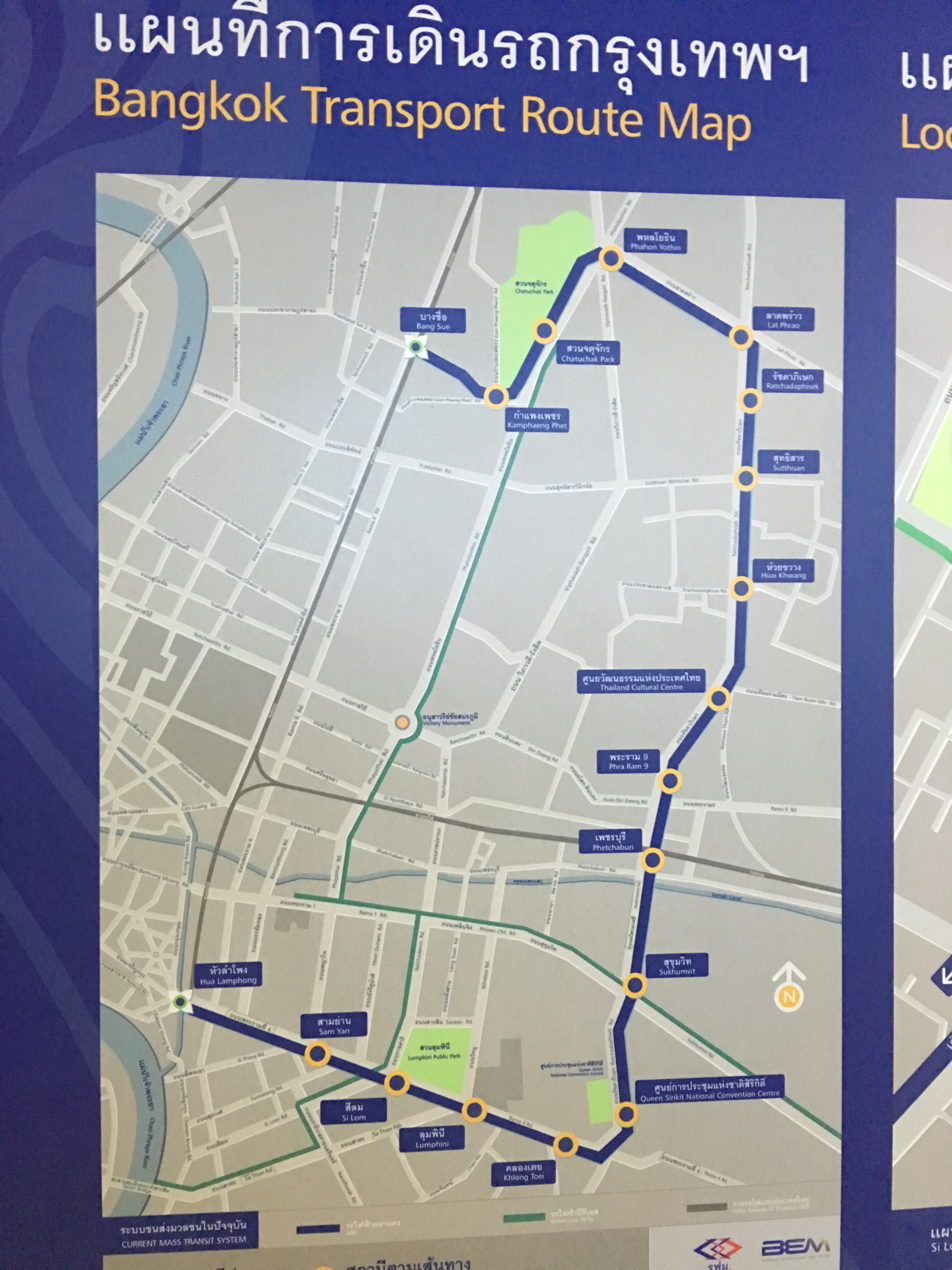
Blue Line map in 2016

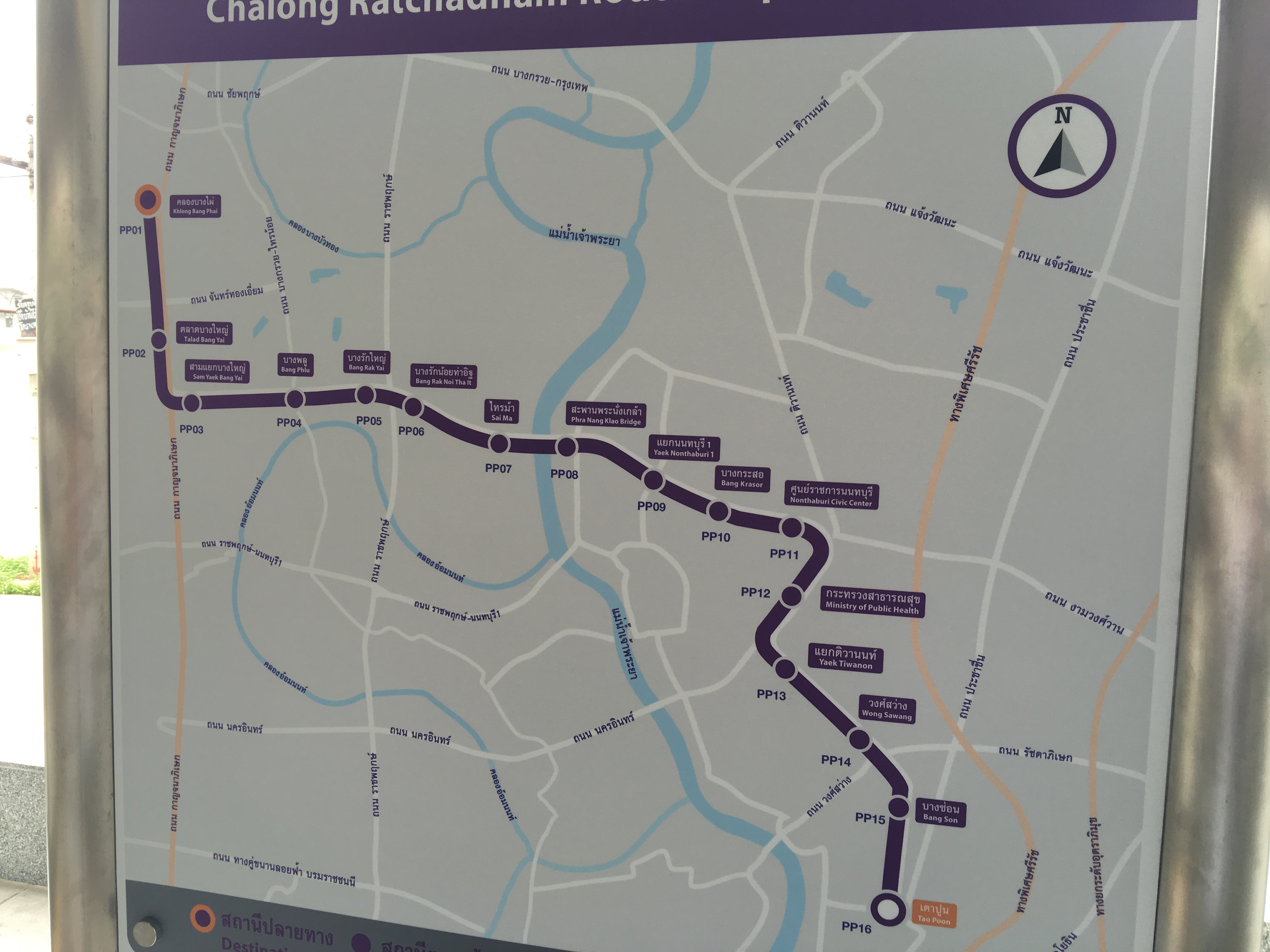
Purple Line map

The MRT was constructed under a concession framework. For the first MRT line, officially known as Chaloem Ratchamongkhon or informally as the "Blue Line", civil infrastructure was provided by the government sector, Mass Rapid Transit Authority of Thailand (MRTA), and handed over to their concessionaire under a 25-year concession agreement. Bangkok Expressway and Metro Public Company Limited (BEM) was the only private sector company that won a bid in MRTA's concession contract for the blue line. As MRTA's concessionaire, BEM provides M&E equipment, including electrical trains, signalling systems, SCADA, communication, PSD, etc. for the subway project and fully operates the system. To maintain the system, BEM has subcontracted in 10 years to Siemens, which was the M&E system supplier since system opening and 7 years maintenance contract to two local maintenance services for north and south line.

The construction of the first Bangkok Metro line, officially known as Chaloem Ratchamongkhon (Thai สายเฉลิมรัชมงคล) – "Celebration of Royal Auspice" – or informally as the "Blue Line", began on 19 November 1996. The project suffered multiple delays not only because of the 1997 economic crisis, but also due to challenging civil engineering works of constructing massive underground structures deep in the water-logged soil upon which the city is built.

The Blue Line was opened for a limited public trial period of several weeks starting on 13 April 2004. On 3 July 2004 the line was officially opened at 19:19 local time by HM King Bhumibol and Queen Sirikit, who were accompanied by other members of the royal family. Within 30 minutes of its opening, sightseers filled the system to its maximum capacity, but after the initial rush ridership has settled down to around 180,000 riders daily — considerably lower than projections of over 400,000, despite fares being slashed in half from 12 to 38 baht to 10-15 baht per trip. From 2006 until 2008, fares ranged between 14 and 36 baht per trip. The fare was raised to 16-41 Baht on 1 January 2009. Daily ridership in 2014 was 253,000.

In August 2016, the Purple Line opened for service. In August 2017, the MRT Blue Line was extended to Tao Poon station allowing interchange with the Purple Lines.

== Operation ==
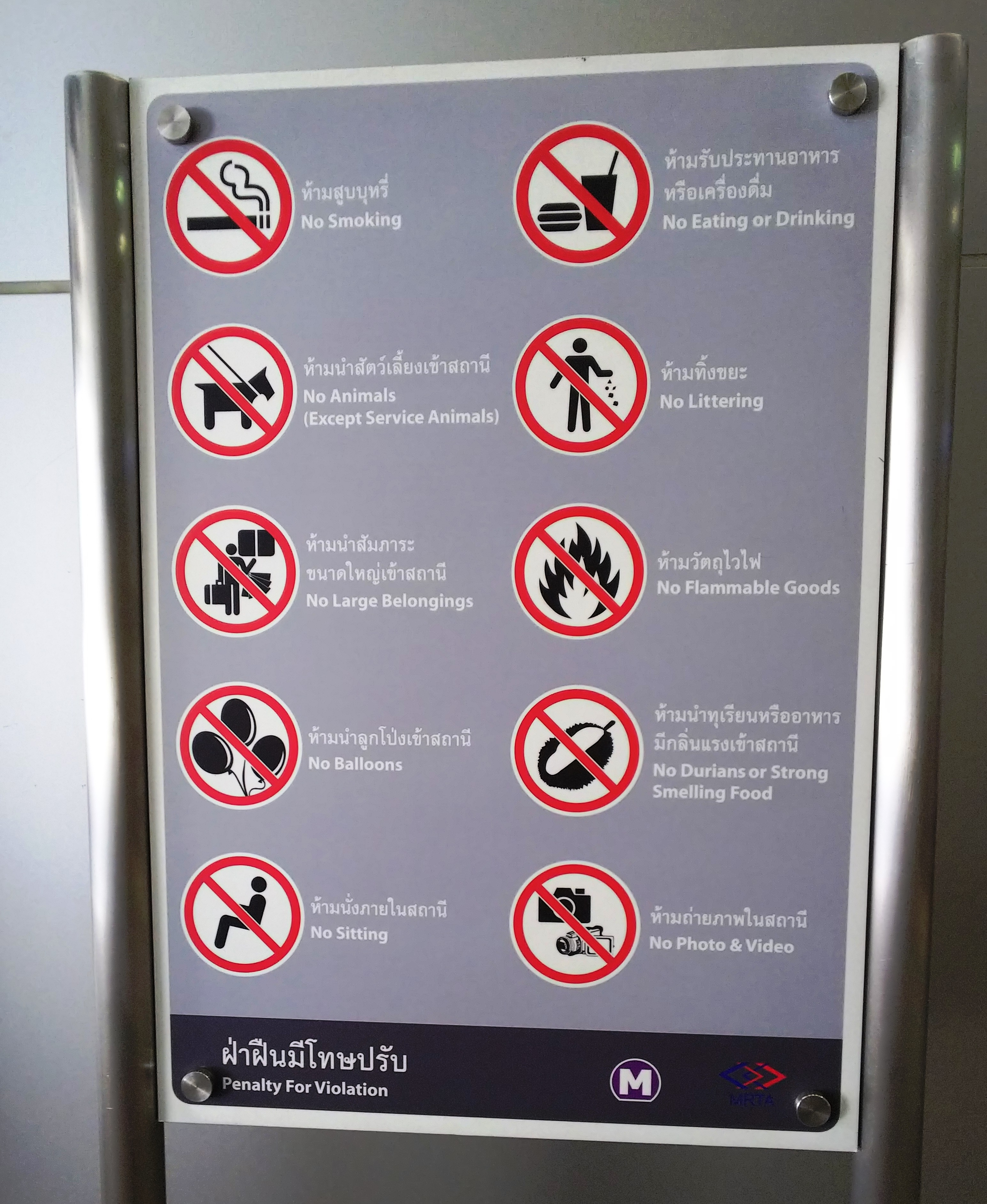
Sign indicating prohibitions in the MRT system

Bangkok, a city situated on a low-lying plain, is susceptible to flooding. Consequently, the entrances to MRT stations in the city are constructed approximately one meter above ground level and are equipped with integrated floodgates to prevent water from entering the system. All stations are accessible, featuring elevators and ramps to accommodate all passengers. Additionally, stations typically have multiple exits, usually four, with some offering interchanges to other transit systems like the BTS Skytrain, Airport Rail Link, and commuter rail services. The passageways connecting these exits are spacious, with some even evolving into shopping areas. Within the stations, maps are displayed to guide passengers, showing local area details and exit locations.

As a safety measure, platform screen doors have been installed at stations. Uniformed security personnel and security cameras are stationed at all platforms to ensure passenger safety. The metro system operates 19 three-car metro trains, specifically of the Siemens Modular Metro type, consisting of two motor cars and a central trailer car.

In an effort to utilize renewable energy, the Bangkok Expressway and Metro company has entered into a 25-year power purchase agreement with CK Power. This agreement aims to supply the mass transit system with 452 million kWh of electricity, primarily sourced from solar energy.

== Ticketing ==
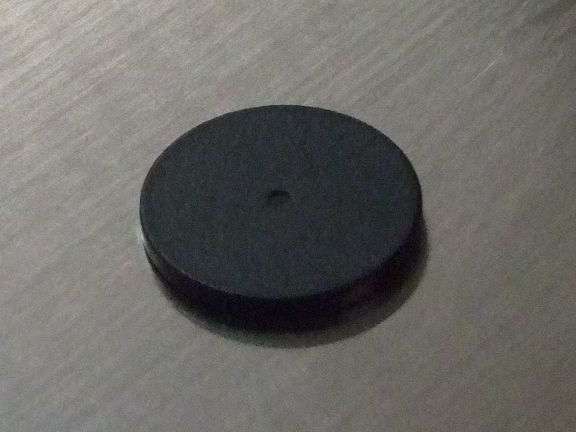
Round black token

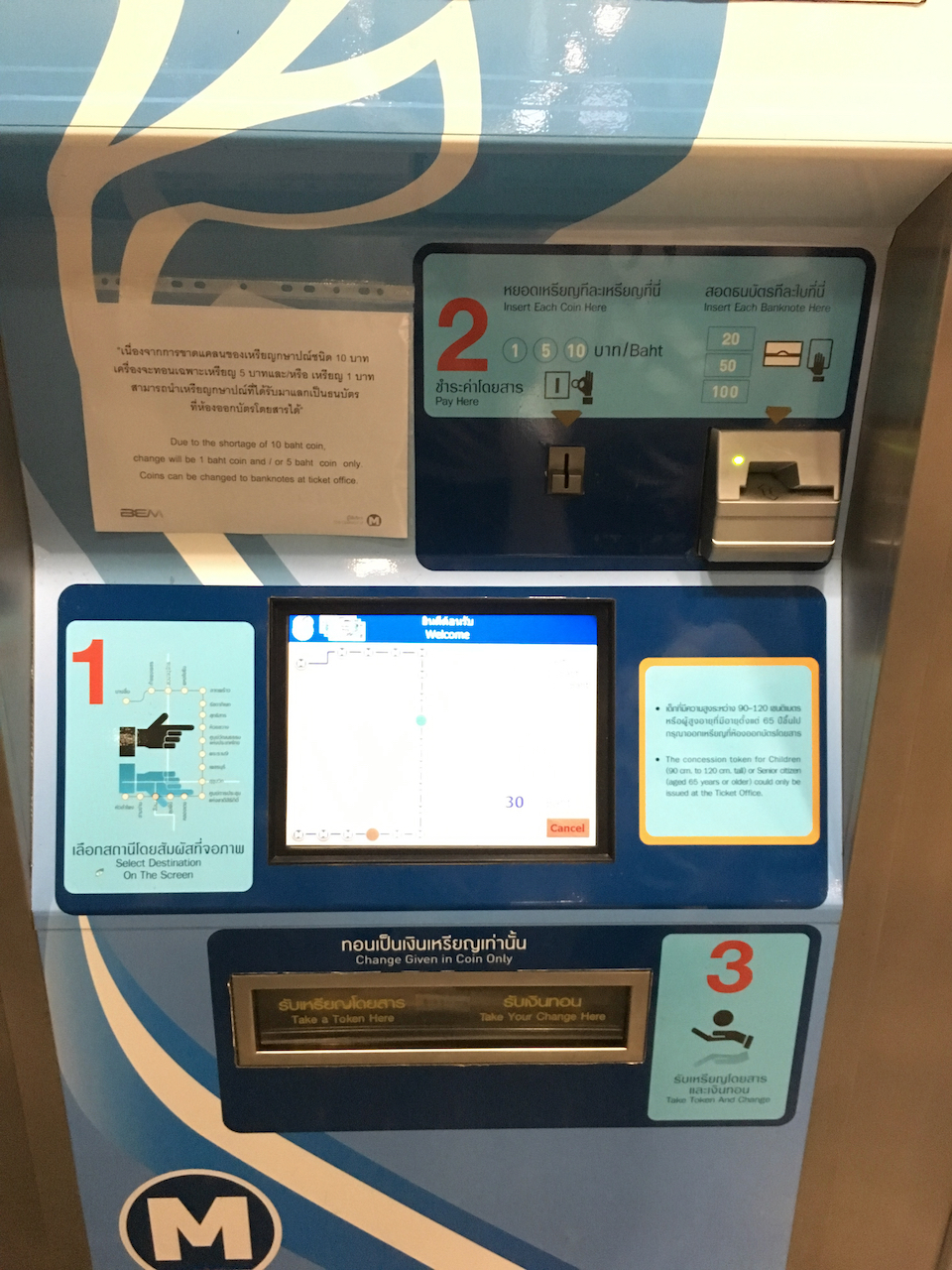
Bangkok MRT ticketing machine on an MRT station

The ticketing system for the Blue and Purple Lines uses RFID contactless technology with round tokens issued for single trips and a contactless stored value card, the MRT Plus card, for frequent travellers. It is planned that a joint ticketing system will be set up so that passengers can use a single ticket on the MRT as well as on the Skytrain. Multi-storey park & ride facilities are provided at Lat Phrao and Thailand Cultural Centre. Motorists who park their cars within station parking facilities are issued with additional contactless smartcards and they need to have them electronically stamped at their destination station.

Smart cards are available in two types:

- A rechargeable card for distance-based fares:
  - for adults, at the same rate as single fares
  - for students, not over 23 years old, at 10% discount
  - for children/elderly, not over 14 old and height between 91 and 120 cm (36 and 47 in), or not less than 60 old, each with 50% discount.

Children under 15 or whose height does not exceed 90 cm may ride for free. Reduced fares for older children and half price fares for the elderly also apply when buying a token at the booth.

From January 2022, MRT started accepting a new payment fare type for Blue Line and Purple Line via EMV contactless using credit, debit and prepaid cards.

The Yellow and Pink lines accept cash, EMV Contactless, and the Rabbit Card.

== Current lines ==
The first line, the Blue Line, opened on 3 July 2004. It runs eastward from Tao Poon Station in Bang Sue District along Kamphaeng Phet, Phahon Yothin and Lat Phrao Roads, then turns south following Ratchadaphisek Road, then west following Rama IV Road to Hua Lamphong Station in Pathum Wan District. The second line, the Purple Line opened on 6 August 2016. The 1.2 km missing link of the Blue Line between Bang Sue and Tao Poon, connecting the two lines opened on 11 August 2017. The first section of the Blue Line extension from Hua Lamphong via Tha Phra to Lak Song opened for full operation on 29 September 2019. The Pink and Yellow Lines opened in 2023.

Line Name	Commencement	Last extension	Next extension	Terminus		Length (km)	Stations	Operator(s)	Daily Ridership (2024)
Rapid Transit
Blue Line	3 July 2004; 22 years ago	23 December 2019; 6 years ago	TBA	Tha Phra	Lak Song	46.91 km (29.15 mi)	38	Bangkok Expressway and Metro	424,397
Purple Line	6 August 2016; 10 years ago	—	2029; 3 years' time	Khlong Bang Phai	Tao Poon	20.92 km (13.00 mi)	16	Bangkok Expressway and Metro	66,934
Monorail
Pink Line	21 November 2023; 2 years ago	20 May 2025; 17 months ago	—	Nonthaburi Civic Centre	Min Buri	36.55 km (22.71 mi)	32	Bangkok Mass Transit System	53,679
Pink Line	21 November 2023; 2 years ago	20 May 2025; 17 months ago	—	Muang Thong Thani	Lake Muang Thong Thani	36.55 km (22.71 mi)	32	Bangkok Mass Transit System	53,679
Yellow Line	3 June 2023; 3 years ago	19 June 2023; 3 years ago	—	Lat Phrao	Samrong	28.62 km (17.78 mi)	23	Bangkok Mass Transit System	37,443
Total						133 km (83 mi)	107		582,453

=== MRT Blue Line ===
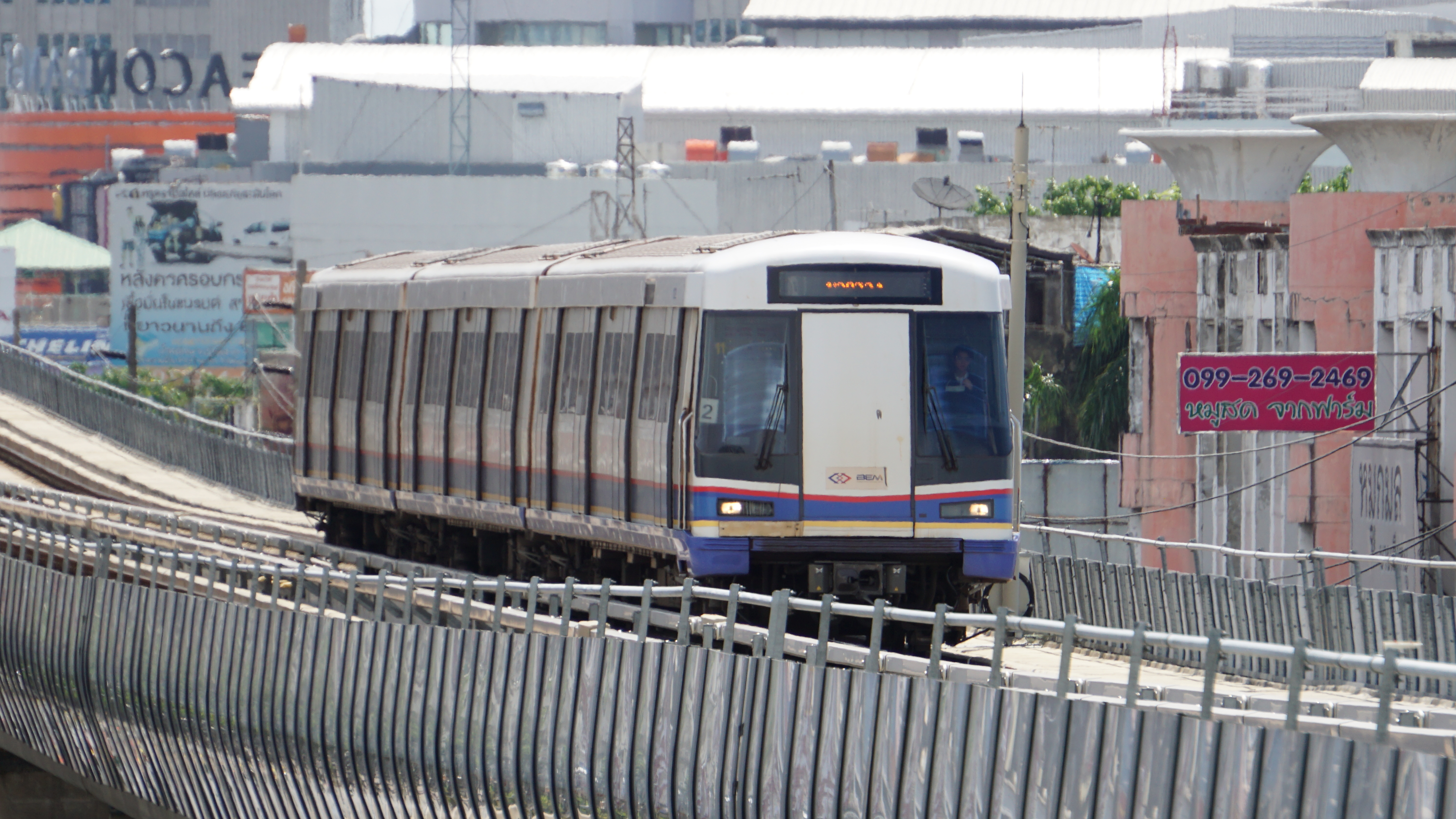
First generation of Blue Line rolling stock

The MRT Blue Line presently runs from Tha Phra to Lak Song and has a carrying capacity of 40,000 people in each direction per hour. Similar to the Skytrain, the Metro uses trains supplied by Siemens that travel up to 80 km/h (50 mph). Passengers can connect to the Skytrain at Si Lom, Sukhumvit and Chatuchak Park stations. The Blue Line has a large depot located on the large MRTA Headquarters in Huai Khwang district and accessed via a spur line located between Phra Ram 9 and Thailand Cultural Centre stations.

The 48-kilometer-long MRT Blue line will serve as a circle line for Bangkok's metro rail system, providing connections to all other major lines, including the SRT Red Lines and the Airport Rail Link. However the complete track does not form a circle, but rather a figure 6. So to ride the complete circle one has either to start at Tha Phra or change trains there.

=== MRT Purple Line ===
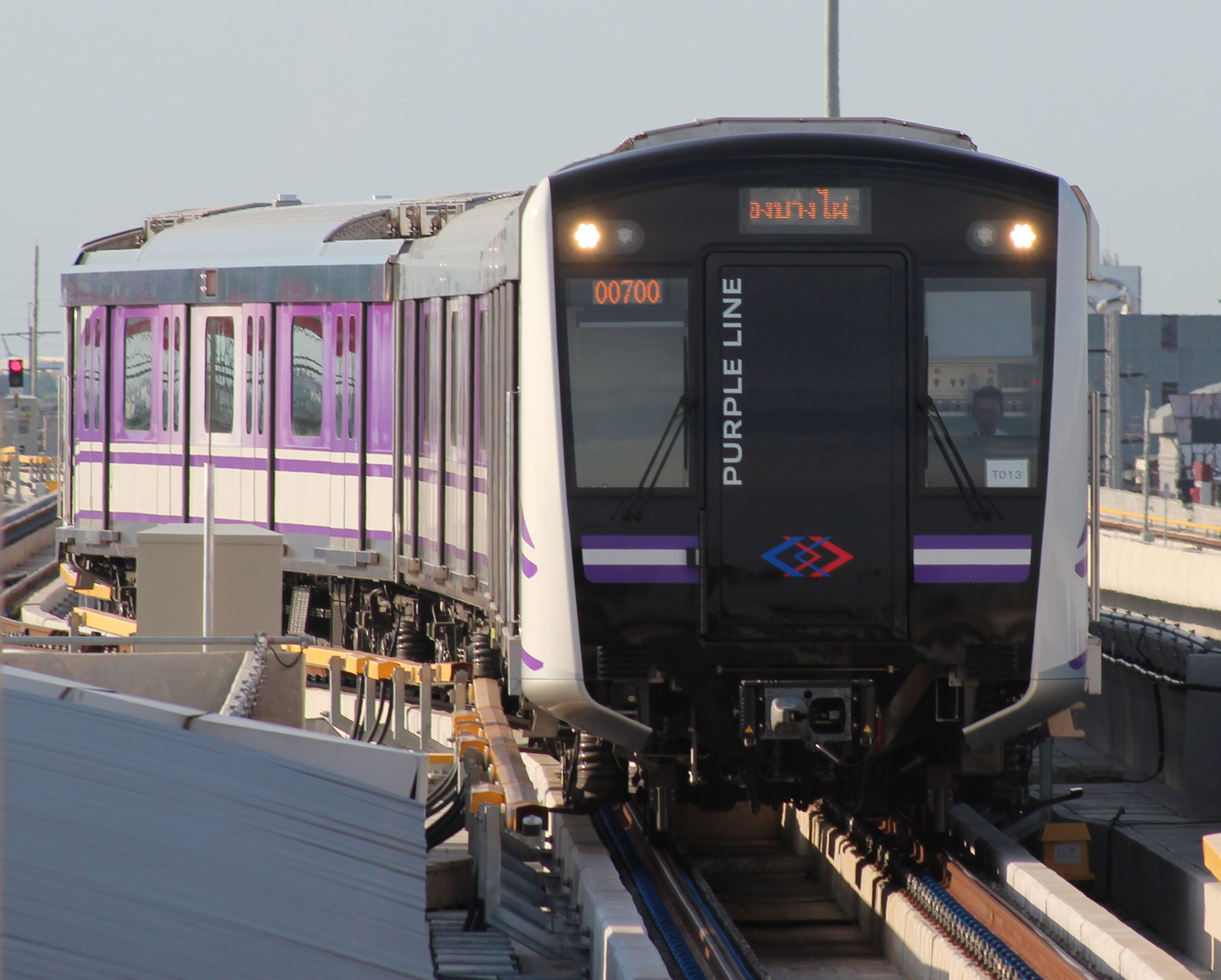
Purple Line rolling stock

The MRT Purple line is divided into two sections, the first 23 kilometer stage from Khlong Bang Phai to Tao Poon, which opened on 6 August 2016, and a planned 19.8 kilometer southern extension from Tao Poon – Phra Pradaeng.

The Purple line currently serves travel demand between the northwestern suburbs of Bangkok in Nonthaburi Province to the mid north areas of Bangkok where it links with the Blue line. Eventually, the line will link with the southern area of Thonburi in Phra Pradaeng District, Samut Prakan Province with a southern extension. This extension will serve the new Thai parliament construction site at Kiak Kai intersection and will run along Samsen Road, then passing through the historic old quarter of Bangkok Rattanakosin Island and many historical places in Dusit and Phra Nakhon District like the national library, Thewet market, Bang Lamphu, the Democracy Monument, the Golden Mount, Phahurat near Chinatown. It then runs near the Memorial Bridge over the river to Wongwian Yai roundabout before continuing south to Chom Thong and ends in Rat Burana District.

=== MRT Yellow Line ===
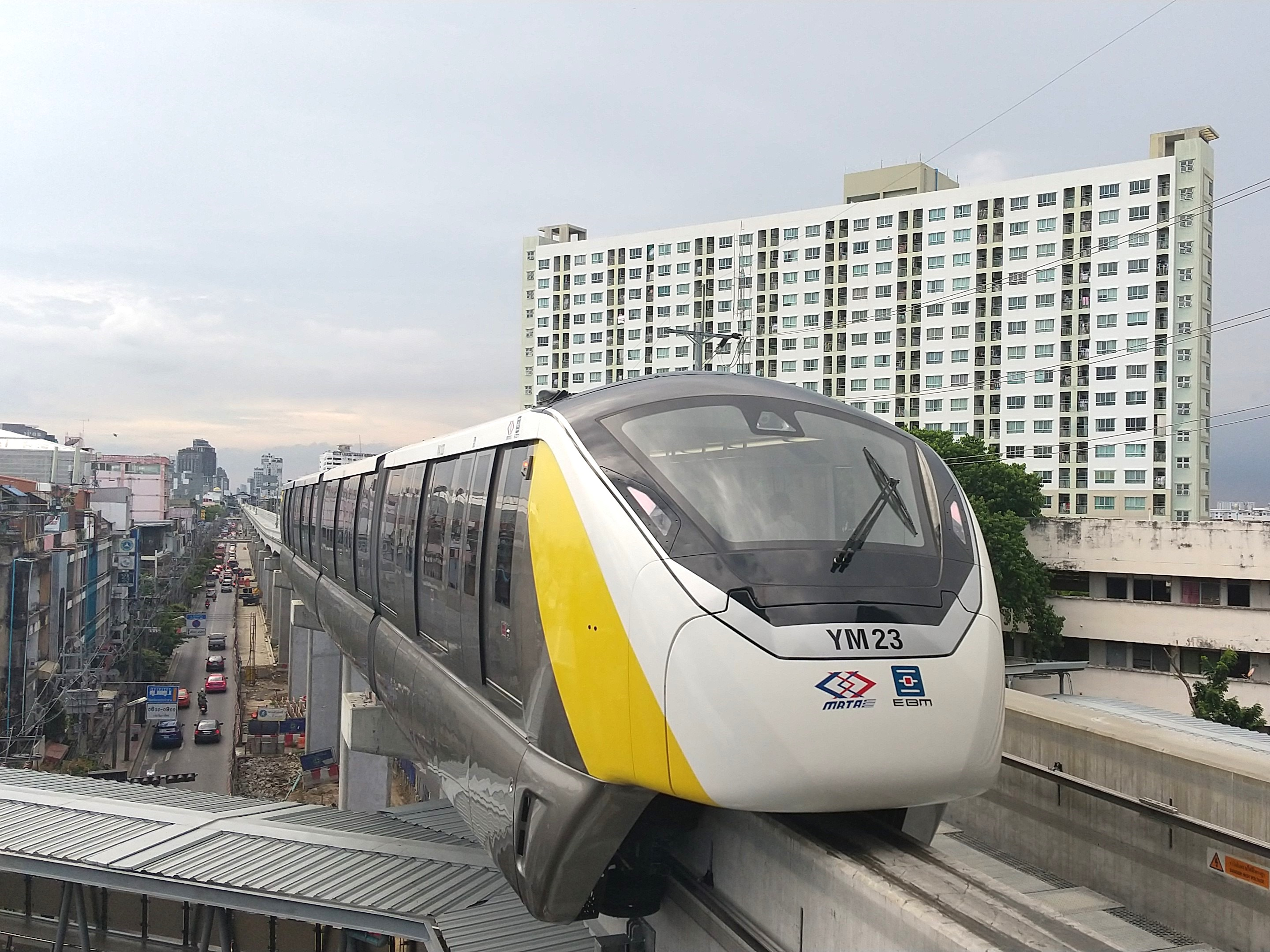
Innovia Monorail 300 rolling stock used on the Yellow Line, approaching Chok Chai 4 station

The 30.4 km long Yellow line has 23 stations. It was originally proposed to be an underground and elevated rapid transit line, but that plan has changed to be built as an elevated monorail line.

In December 2011, the MRTA was instructed by the MOT to divide the Yellow Line into two Phases for tender and construction purposes and to control land appropriation costs. In June 2012, the MRTA contracted consultants to undertake detailed designs of the Yellow Line. In February 2013, OTP stated that the tender for the Yellow line should be ready by late 2013 for tender in early 2014. However, similar to the Pink Line, delays in finalising the technical requirements of the tender in relation to the selection of monorail rolling stock, which determines the type of track to be constructed resulted in a significant delay. The subsequent political turmoil of 2014 caused further delay. Thereafter, the coup of May 2014 resulted in a new military administration and the tender being deferred for 2014.

The MRTA tender was subsequently not released until mid-2016. In early December 2016, BSR Joint Venture (comprising BTS Group Holdings, which owns 75%, Sino-Thai Engineering and Construction – STEC, and Ratchaburi Electricity Generation Holding – RATCH), won the bid for the project. The BSR also won the bid the Pink Line project. On 16 June 2017, a contract was signed for the Lat Phrao-Samrong section with the Mass Rapid Transit Authority of Thailand by a consortium including BTS Group Holdings, Sino-Thai Engineering and Construction, and Ratchaburi Electricity Generation Holding. Construction of the MRT Yellow Line began in March 2018, and free trial operations began from Hua Mak station to Samrong BTS Station in June 2023. Full operations began on July 3, 2023.

=== MRT Pink Line ===
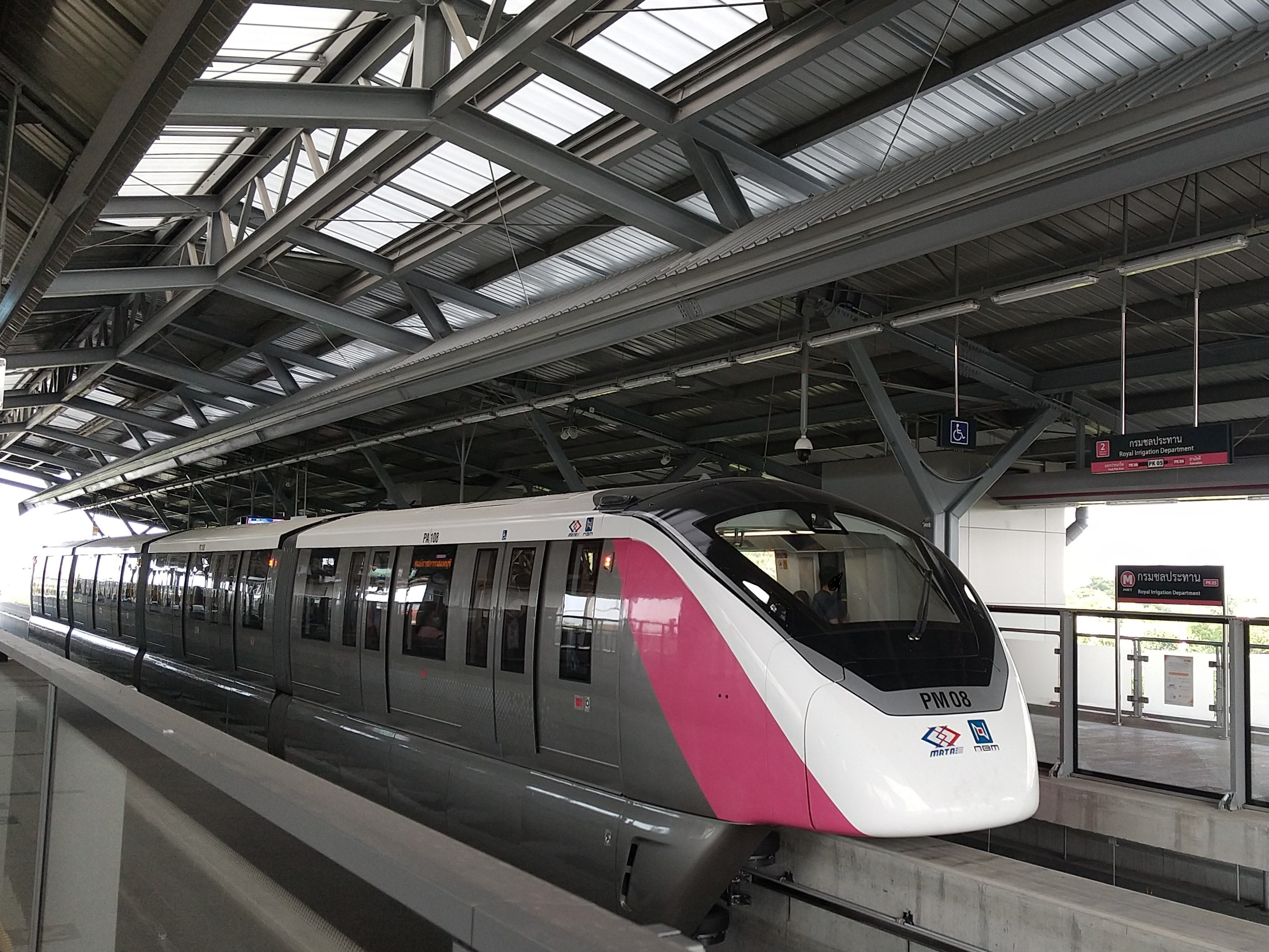
Innovia Monorail 300 rolling stock used on the Pink Line, at Royal Irrigation Department Station

The 35.5 km long MRT Pink line has 30 stations and is a monorail line. It runs in the northern part of the city from east Bangkok in Minburi District (also transfers to MRT Orange Line) along Ram Inthra Road to west Bangkok (Pak Kret district, Nonthaburi Province) Chaeng Watthana Road and Tiwanon Road ending at Nonthaburi Civic Center with interchange to the MRT Purple Line.

The line also transfers with the SRT Dark Red Line, the BTS Sukhumvit Line extension to Lam Lukka, and the BMA Proposed MRT Grey Line in the future.

The Pink line was due to be tendered in the 3rd quarter of 2013 with construction due to commence in early 2014. However, delays in preparation of the tender in relation to the selection of monorail rolling stock and subsequent political protests resulting in a snap national election in early February 2014, further delayed the Pink Line tender. A subsequent coup in May 2014 resulted in a new military administration and the tender being deferred for 2014. The MRTA tender was subsequently not released until mid-2016.

In early December 2016, BSR Joint Venture (comprising BTS Group Holdings, which owns 75%, Sino-Thai Engineering and Construction – STEC, and Ratchaburi Electricity Generation Holding – RATCH), won the bid. The BSR also won the bid for the Yellow Line project. On 16 June 2017, the Pink Line project contracts were signed with the BSR consortium by the Mass Rapid Transit Authority of Thailand with a scheduled operational date of 2022. Construction of the MRT Pink Line began in late 2017. The line opened for trial operation in November 2023 and is due to be fully operational by December 2023.

== Future plans ==
Line Name	Planned Opening Date	Terminus		Length (km)	Stations	Status
Rapid Transit						
Blue Line	TBA	Lak Song	Phutthamonthon Sai 4	8.3 km (5.2 mi)	4	Postponed
Purple Line	March 2027; 4 months' time	Khlong Bang Phai	Tao Poon	22.78 km (14.15 mi)	17	Under construction
Orange Line	2027; 1 year's time	Thailand Cultural Centre	Yaek Rom Klao	21 km (13 mi)	17	Under construction
Orange Line	2029; 3 years' time	Bang Khun Non	Thailand Cultural Centre	13.1 km (8.1 mi)	11	Under construction
Orange Line	TBA	Taling Chan	Bang Khun Non	4.4 km (2.7 mi)	1	Approved
Silver Line	TBA	Bangna	Suvarnabhumi Airport-South Terminal	24 km (15 mi)	14	Transferred from BMA
Monorail						
Brown Line	TBA	Nonthaburi Civic Centre	Yaek Lam Sali	21 km (13 mi)	20	Approved
Yellow Line	TBA	Lat Phrao	Ratchayothin	2.5 km (1.6 mi)	2	Shelved
Grey Line	TBA	Khlong Si	Thong Lo	21.25 km (13.20 mi)	20	Transferred from BMA
Grey Line	TBA	Phra Khanong	Tha Phra	23.65 km (14.70 mi)	24	Transferred from BMA
Light Blue	TBA	Prachasongkhro	Chong Nonsi	9.5 km (5.9 mi)	9	Transferred from BMA
Total				171.63 km (106.65 mi) (Note: Excluded shelved project)	135 (Note: Excluded shelved project)	

=== MRT Purple Line South section ===
The planned southern extension from Tao Pun to Rat Burana will run south through Bangkok's old quarter from Tao Poon junction on a viaduct. It then will go into an underground structure along Sam Sen Road, passing the new Thai parliament site, and transfers to the proposed Red inner-city shortcut commuter at Sanghi intersection. It passes the national library in Dusit District before it reaches Phra Nakhon District at Thewet Market.

The line turns east at Bang Lamphu and goes along the city moat to the south, with transfers possible to the MRT Orange Line at Ratchadamnoen Road near the Democracy Monument. It passes Golden Mount before possible transfers to the extension of the Blue Line at Wang Burapha near Yaowarat Road in Chinatown and the Phahurat textile market.

The line crosses the Chao Phraya River near the Memorial Bridge towards the Wongwian Yai roundabout in Thonburi on the west bank, with possible transfers to the Dark Red Line commuter and to Wongwian Yai. It continues south to Chom Thong, then on an elevated structure for 5.5 kilometres (3.4 mi) and ends in Rat Burana District, a short distance to the nearby Phra Pradaeng suburban town in Samut Prakan Province. The total length will be about 23.6 km, including ten underground and seven elevated stations.

The Thai Cabinet was expected to approve the Purple Line Southern extension in mid 2017 with a tender due by the 2nd half of 2017. On 25 July 2017, the Cabinet approved the 101 billion baht budget and tender for the extension but the tender was delayed until 2018 due to land acquisition issues. There was a further delay to an early 2019 date as the tender was changed to a PPP tender. However, a subsequent delay in finalising the PPP process resulted in a new tender date of April 2020 but this has been further delayed with an expected tender by the end of 2020.

Construction contracts were finally signed in March 2022 for a planned 2027 opening date.

=== MRT Orange Line ===
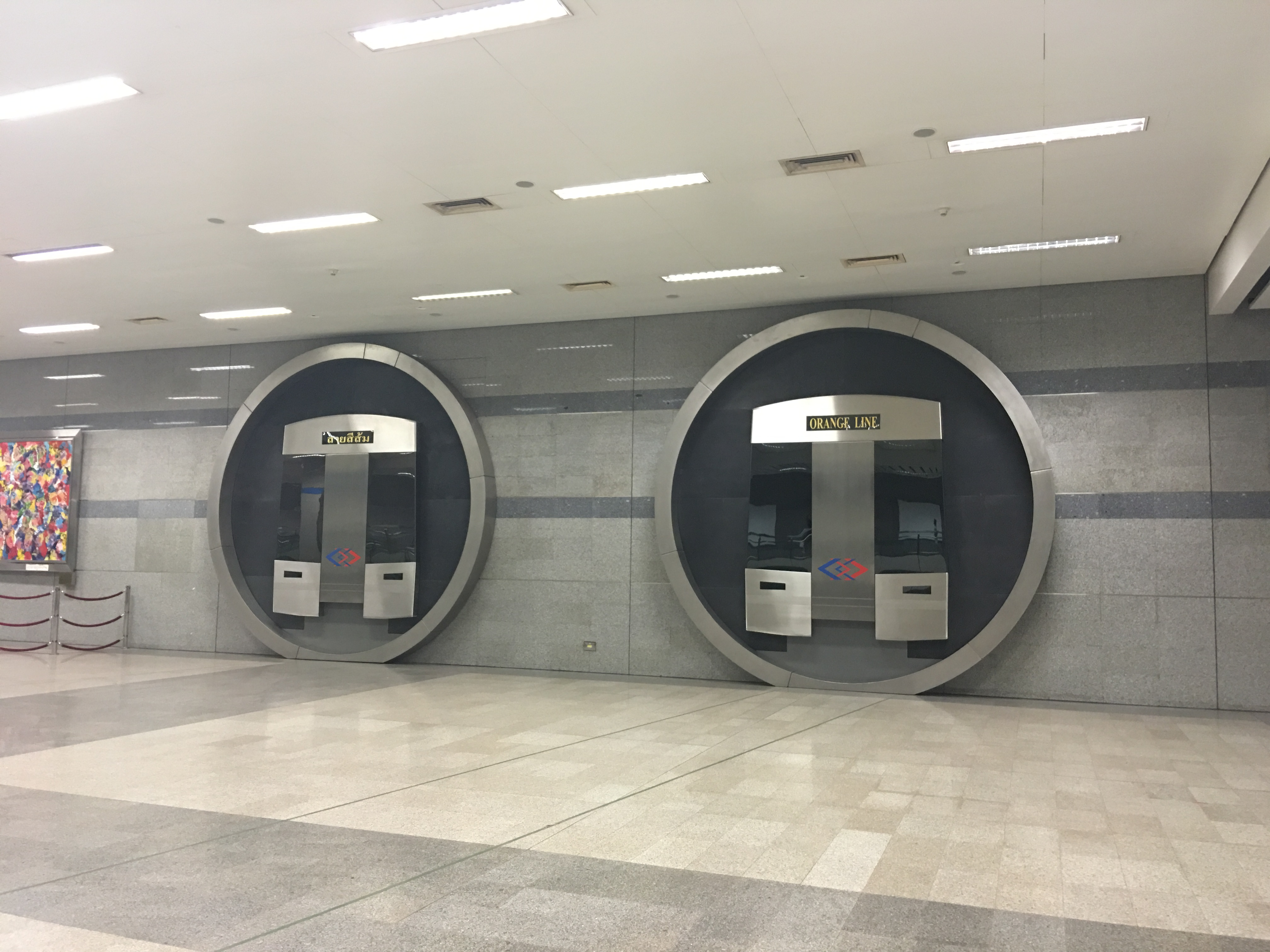
The area prepared for the MRT Orange Line platforms at Thailand Cultural Centre MRT station, interchange with Blue Line

The Orange Line will start from Yaek Rom Klao station in Min Buri district as an elevated structure on Ramkhamhaeng Road (former Suka Phiban III Road), interchanging with the Pink Line at Min Buri station from eastern suburb in and goes underground near Lam Sali intersection in Bang Kapi District, also transfers to MRT Yellow Line. It continues southwest along Ramkhamhaeng Road, passing Hua Mak Stadium and Ramkhamhaeng University. Then it turns to the west and crosses Pradit Manutham Road to the current MRT depot. Then it goes to Thailand Cultural Centre Station, the alignment crosses over and transfers to the current MRT Blue Line. It continues via Din Daeng housing estates and Bangkok City Hall 2 to Vibhavadi Rangsit Road, Sam Liam Din Daeng Junction. Then turn left into Ratchaprarop Road towards Pratunam and turn right into Phetchaburi Road then interchange with BTS Sukhumvit Line at Ratchathewi Station. It continues along Larn Luang Road and Ratchadamnoen Road. Then it crosses the Chao Phraya River near Phra Pinklao Bridge, passes Siriraj Hospital and goes along Bangkok Noi Rail line and terminates at Bang Khun Non Station, interchanges with MRT Blue Line again. The total length is 35.9 km.

This Line is divided into 2 sections

- Eastern section from Thailand Cultural Centre – Yaek Rom Klao (22.5 km).
- Western section Bang Khun Non – Thailand Cultural Centre (13.4 km)

The phase 1 Eastern section began construction in June 2017 with a planned 2024 opening. The Phase 2 Western section extension from Thailand Cultural Centre to Bang Khun Non was released for tender on 3 July 2020 as a Public-Private Partnership project.

When fully completed, the line will be 35.9-km long, mostly underground, with 29 stations (7 elevated stations for 8.9 km and other 22 underground stations for 27 km).

=== MRT Brown Line ===
The 22.1 km long Brown line is under study by the OTP. It is proposed to run from Khae Rai, Nonthaburi to Bueng Kum with 20 stations and be a monorail line.

The line was originally proposed as the Gold Line by the Pheu Thai party for the Bangkok Governors election held in March 2013. This was in response to objections by Kasetsart University to long proposed Expressway extensions in the area. The line would essentially have replaced the need to build an elevated Expressway. However, the Pheu Thai candidate did not win the Bangkok Governor election and the Gold Line was dropped with the Deputy Minister of Transport stating that land appropriation costs were too high. Subsequently, OTP has reworked the Gold Line proposal into a new Brown Line following much the same route. As of June 2013, the route was under preliminary study by OTP. Public hearings on the Brown line were held in 2017. The MOT announced that a 14-month feasibility study into the line would be completed in 2018. By August 2018, OTP had completed the feasibility study and conducted public hearings. Although, there was much public support for building the MRT Brown line, public opposition to the N2 expressway remained high. OTP intends to submit the project for Cabinet approval by the end of October 2018. In early June 2019, the MRTA Board approved the investment plan for the Brown Line and integrated design with the N2 Expressway conducted by EXAT. The project is expected to be tendered in 2024.

This line should not be confused with the original 2004 13 km MRT Brown Line proposal from Bang Kapi to Min Buri. This was subsequently merged in 2009 into an extended MRT Orange Line.

== Accidents and incidents ==
On 17 January 2005, just after 09:15, an empty train returning to the depot collided with a peak-hour train filled with passengers at the Thailand Cultural Centre MRT station. 140 people were hurt, most of whom sustained only minor injuries and the entire Metro network was shut down for two weeks.

After initial investigations, it was found that the empty train had run into problems shortly before the accident, grinding to a halt on a curve leading to the depot. The driver applied the train brake and was waiting to be towed to the maintenance centre close to the Thailand Cultural Centre station.

A rescue train was attempting to connect to the stalled train when the driver was told to release the brake even though coupling had not been successful. It was then that the empty train began to roll backwards at a speed of ten metres per second and into the other train, which was carrying passengers. Therefore, it was believed that the incident was caused by negligence due to insufficient training of operation staff. This accident caused damage to both trainsets, with heavily damaged areas limited to the two cars that collided. From the extent of the damage, investigators estimated the collision speed to be around 60 km/h. However, one train, which was rebuilt from the repair of the minor-damaged cars, was already fitted for operation at the end of 2006 and the remaining one was still under heavy repair until mid of 2007; it was released into service in October 2007. The cost resulting from the accident might be a much higher figure than BMCL quoted, and it was expected to be at least 400 million baht, which was totally insured by a local insurance company.

The Metro resumed full operation on 1 February 2005, and passenger numbers soon rose back to pre-crash levels, partly due to a temporary promotional fare scheme that allowed passengers to travel any distance on the MRT for only ten baht (~US$0.33).

== Ridership ==
The first few years of operations saw less than forecast ridership, but pax numbers grew gradually over time. After the opening of the Tao Poon interchange station between Blue Line and Purple Line in mid-August 2017, ridership immediately increased especially on the Purple Line. In September 2017, BEM stated that average daily ridership of the Blue Line had increased from 340,000 to 360,000 after the opening. The Purple line ridership significantly increased from 33,000 to nearly 50,000. In August 2018, the MRTA Deputy Governor stated that daily ridership for the Purple Line had increased to 60,000 each weekday. After the opening of the Blue Line extension to Lak Song on 29 September 2019, daily ridership increased to 400,000 for the Blue line and 70,000 for the Purple line. Ridership decreased significantly during the outbreak of coronavirus in Thailand.

=== Ridership statistics ===
Annual ridership (all lines)
Year	Total ridership	Average daily ridership
2011	69,024,000	189,083
2012	80,575,000	220,167
2013	86,427,000	236,833
2014	92,403,000	253,417
2015	95,044,000	260,500
2016	100,106,000	273,583
2017	107,484,000	294,476
2018	113,355,000	310,561
2019	122,559,000	335,778
2020	94,942,000	259,404
2021	53,319,000	146,079
2022	98,577,000	270,073

=== Stations ===
Busiest stations (all lines)
No.	Station	Line	Year total passengers (2021)
1	Sukhumvit	Blue	9,627,729
2	Chatuchak Park	Blue	6,865,636
3	Phra Ram 9	Blue	6,855,613
4	Phetchaburi	Blue	6,791,555
5	Si Lom	Blue	5,333,875
6	Huai Khwang	Blue	4,981,804
7	Phahon Yothin	Blue	4,241,269
8	Thailand Cultural Centre	Blue	4,103,960
9	Lak Song	Blue	3,989,684
10	Lat Phrao	Blue	3,779,865

Least-used stations (all lines)
No.	Station	Line	Year total passengers (2021)
1	Bang Rak Yai	Purple	256,539
2	Sam Yaek Bang Yai	Purple	297,085
3	Sai Ma	Purple	435,570
4	Bang Phlat	Blue	485,490
5	Bang Phlu	Purple	495,914

== See also ==
- Mass Rapid Transit Master Plan in Bangkok Metropolitan Region
- BTS Skytrain
- Sukhumvit line
- Silom line
- Airport Rail Link (Bangkok)
- SRT Dark Red Line
- SRT Light Red Line
- Bangkok BRT
- BMA Gold Line
- Lists of rapid transit systems
- List of rapid transit stations in Bangkok
