= Orange Line (Bangkok) =

Planned metro line in Bangkok, Thailand

MRT Orange Line รถไฟฟ้ามหานคร สายสีส้ม

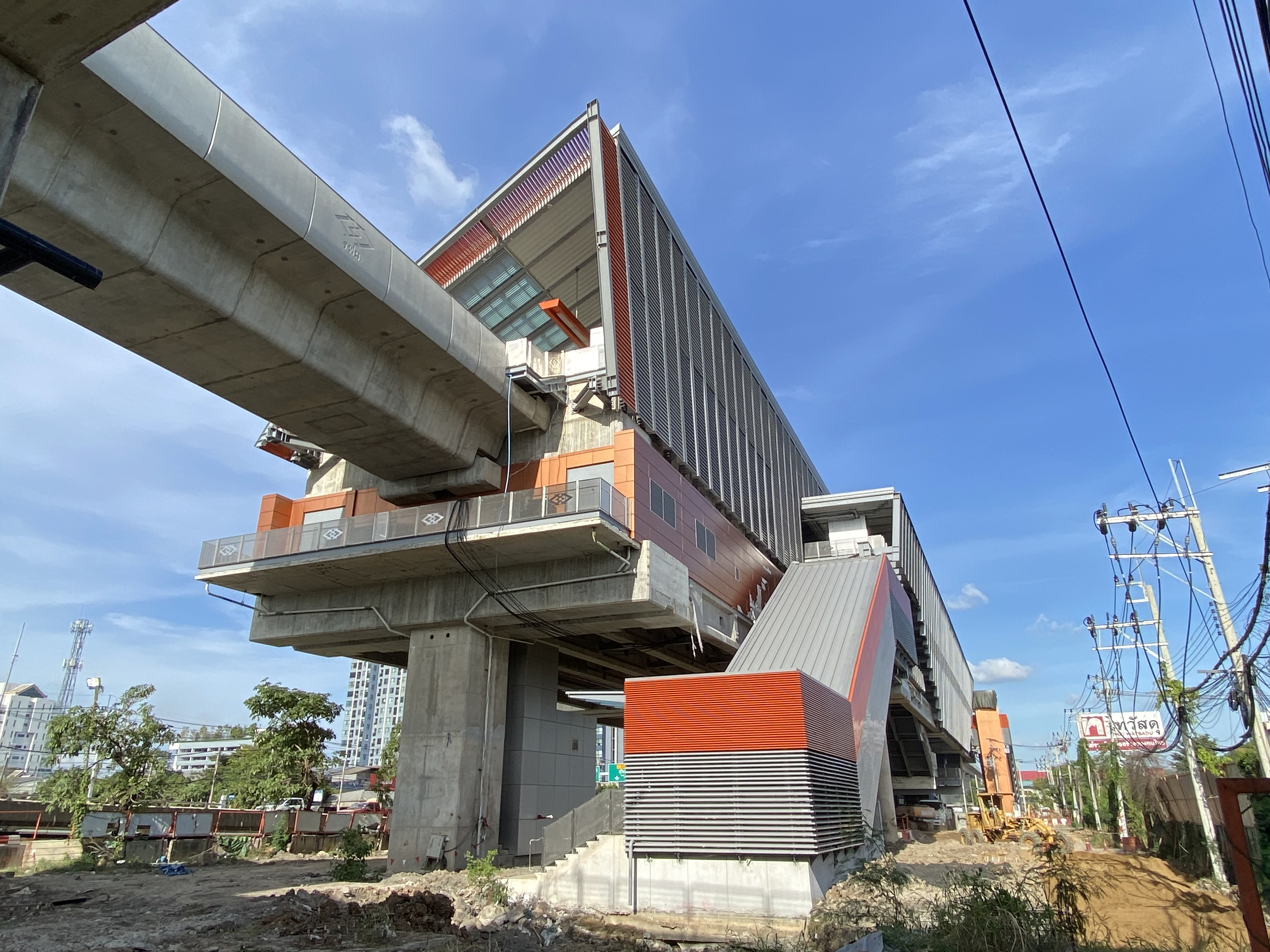
- Min Buri Station

Overview
- Status: Structure Complete : OR13 Thailand Cultural Centre - OR29 Yaek Rom Klao; Under Construction : OR02 Bang Khun Non - OR13 Thailand Cultural Centre; Future : OR01 Taling Chan - OR02 Bang Khun Non
- Owner: Mass Rapid Transit Authority of Thailand
- Locale: Bangkok, Thailand
- Termini: OR01 Taling Chan; OR29 Yaek Rom Klao
- Stations: 17 (Structure Complete); 11 (Under construction); 1 (future)
- Website: https://www.mrta-orangelineeast.com/en/home

Service
- Type: Rapid transit
- System: MRT
- Operator: Bangkok Expressway and Metro
- Depot: Phra Ram 9
- Rolling stock: Siemens; 32 three-car trains

History
- Work began: 9 February 2017; 9 years ago
- Planned opening: 2027 : OR13 Thailand Cultural Centre - OR29 Yaek Rom Klao; 2029 : OR02 Bang Khun Non - OR13 Thailand Cultural Centre; TBA : OR01 Taling Chan - OR02 Bang Khun Non

Technical
- Line length: 38.78 km (24.10 mi); Elevated 8.43 km (5.24 mi); Underground: 30.35 km (18.86 mi)
- Track gauge: 1,435 mm (4 ft 8 1/2 in) standard gauge
- Electrification: 750 V DC third rail
- Operating speed: 80 km/h (50 mph)

The MRT Orange Line (Thai: รถไฟฟ้ามหานคร สายสีส้ม) is an under-construction rapid transit line of the Mass Rapid Transit Authority of Thailand (MRTA) in the Bangkok Metropolitan Area, Thailand. When fully completed, the MRT Orange line will be 35.9 km (22.3 mi) long with 29 stations (7 stations will be elevated for 8.9 km (5.5 mi) and 22 will be underground for 27 km (16.8 mi)), including an interchange with the current Thailand Cultural Centre Station of MRT Blue Line).

The MRT Orange Line is divided into two sections: the 22.5 km (14.0 mi) Eastern Section, running from Yaek Rom Klao to Thailand Cultural Centre, and the 13.4 km (8.3 mi) Western Section, extending from Thailand Cultural Centre to Bang Khun Non.

Construction of the Eastern Section commenced in June 2017, and civil works were completed 100% as of June 2023. However, delays in awarding contracts for the signaling systems and rolling stock postponed the line’s opening. In December 2024, Bangkok Expressway and Metro Public Company Limited (BEM) signed a contract with Siemens Mobility and its consortium partners to supply rolling stock and signaling systems for both sections of the line. On August 6, 2025 the MRTA announced that the Eastern Section is projected to open to the public in late-2027 earlier than the previously announced opening date of 2028.

Construction of the Western Section began in July 2024. As of the end of July 2025, civil construction had progressed to 14.06%. This section is expected to require approximately six years for completion, with an anticipated opening in July 2030.

== Route alignment ==
The MRT Orange Line will travel along a mostly east-west axis from Bangkok's eastern suburbs, passing through the city center and Ko Rattanakosin, before serving Thonburi on the west bank of the Chao Phraya River.

The initial phase of the Orange Line will travel along an elevated structure above Ramkhamkhaeng Road from Yaek Rom Klao station, near the Ramkhamhaeng-Suwinthawong Junction in Min Buri District, to Ban Ma Junction in Bang Kapi District for 7.5 km (4.7 mi) before transitioning underground. The line will continue to travel southwest under Ramkhamhaeng Road until its intersection with Rama IX Road, whence it will proceed westward under Rama IX Road before terminating at Thailand Cultural Centre.

Interchanges for this segment will be available to MRT Pink Line at Min Buri, MRT Yellow Line at Yaek Lam Sali, and the MRT Blue Line at Thailand Cultural Centre.

The western section of the MRT Orange Line will travel west from Thailand Cultural Centre Station via Din Daeng housing estates and Bangkok City Hall 2 to Vibhavadi Rangsit Road, Sam Liam Din Daeng Junction. It will follow Ratchaprarop Road towards Pratunam before following Phetchaburi Road and Lan Luang Road as the alignment approaches Ko Rattanakosin. The line will travel under Ratchadamnoen Avenue to serve Sanam Luang and Banglamphu before crossing the Chao Phraya River near Phra Pinklao Bridge. Once in Thonburi, the line will follow the Bangkok Noi spur line of the SRT commuter train before terminating at Bang Khun Non, located at Charan Sanitwong road, where there will be an interchange with the MRT Blue Line.

In addition to interchanging with the MRT Blue Line, the western segment will also include an interchange to the Airport Rail Link at Ratchaprarop station, the BTS Sukhumvit Line at Ratchathewi Station, the MRT Purple Line at the future Democracy Monument station. A further extension to Taling Chan railway station is envisioned.

== History ==
=== Development ===
The original plan of the MRT Orange Line aimed to serve travel demand between the northwestern area of Thonburi, at Bang Bamru Railway Station in Bang Phlat District, and the east of Bangkok in Bang Kapi District. It was planned to run along Ramkhamhaeng Road and Ratchawithi Road, passing many public places like Hua Mak Stadium, Dusit Zoo and Victory Monument, and provide access to universities including Ramkhamhaeng University, Suan Sunandha and Suan Dusit Rajabhat University and many government offices. In the 1990s proposal for the Orange Line, it indicates a route length of 27.3 kilometers from Bang Kapi to Rat Burana District, while the planned extensions are to Ban Na for 16.4 kilometers and finally to Min Buri District for 10 kilometers.

In 2009, OTP proposed that the original MRT Brown line plan from Bang Kapi District elevated along Ram Khamhaeng Road to the eastern suburbs in Saphan Sung District and Min Buri District, be merged with the Orange Line and updated Bangkok's mass rapid transit master plan accordingly. In July 2011, the section from Bang Khun Non to Taling Chan was finally scrapped in favour of the SRT Light Red Line spur line which duplicates the same route. In 2012, there were further notable changes made to the central and western sections of the Orange Line. The section from Din Daeng District to Bang Bamru was rerouted away from Victory Monument and Ratchawithi road route to further run south to Pratunam and then west along Petchaburi Road and Larn Luang Road. Continuing farther west along Ratchadamnoen Klang Road and Sanam Luang before passing under the Chao Praya river and finally terminating at Bang Khun Non to interchange with the MRT Blue Line extension.

The MRT Orange line Eastern section was originally planned to be tendered by the end of 2013. However, due to protests by residents regarding station footprint and compulsory land acquisition around stations at Pratunam, Ratchaprarop, Pracha Songkhro and Soesim stations the MRTA needed another 12 months to redesign sections of the line. Subsequently, political protests against the Thai government led to the metro transport funding bill lapsing when parliament was dissolved in December 2013. On 9 December 2015, Cabinet finally approved the Orange Line. On 19 April 2016, the Cabinet further approved a budget of 82.9 billion baht for Phase 1 Eastern section to build 17 stations and 22.5 km (14.0 mi) of rail from the Thailand Cultural Centre to Minburi, of which 12.2 km (7.6 mi) will be underground and 9 km (5.6 mi) will be elevated. The consultation was led by MHPM for project implementation services to Chotjinda Consultant for construction supervision and to MAA Consultant, also for project management and construction.

=== Western section tender delay and litigation ===
On 3 July 2020, the MRTA released the tender for the design and construction of the Western extension. However in late August 2020, the tender submission deadline was subsequently delayed. and the MRTA amended the tender assessment criteria resulting in a lawsuit and an injunction suspending the tender decision. The tender was subsequently cancelled by the MRTA in February 2021 given ongoing litigation by the BTSC. After approval by the Administrative Court given ongoing litigation, a new tender issued in October has a deadline for bids of January 2022.

The Criminal Court - Corruption and Malfeasance Division hearing into the cancelled tender process was conducted in late December 2021 which further delayed the reissued tender timeframe. Subject to court approval, the MRTA planned to review tender bids for a period of 3 months before seeking Cabinet approval for a reissued tender in April or May 2022. The MRTA reissued the new tender on 24 May 2022 with tender packages available for purchase until 10 June. Fourteen different companies purchased the auction envelopes.

The 141 billion baht western extension consists of 86 billion baht for civil works, 14 billion for land appropriation and 31 billion for systems installation, rolling stock and maintenance. The winning bidder was announced by the MRTA on 9 September 2022 with BEM winning the right to build and run the extension over the ITD consortium. However, continued litigation by the BTSC into 2023 has delayed the start of construction.

In November 2024, AECOM has been chosen by CH. Karnchang Plc (CK) is the lead designer for the western section, while Egis is to offer project management and supervision services on a section. EPC consultancy services were handled by Dorsch Gruppe and its Asian subsidiary, along with China Railway No. 2 Engineering Group Co., Ltd.

== Construction progress ==
=== Eastern section ===
Construction contracts were signed on 9 February 2017 between the MRTA and CKST Joint Venture consortium. Construction finally started in June 2017 with a 1980 day construction period with a scheduled opening in October 2022.

At the end of the year, 31 December 2017, progress of civil works construction was at 4.66% according to the MRTA. By the end of July 2018, overall construction progress was 13.57%. By 30 September 2018, overall construction had progressed to 18.33%. At the end of March 2019, construction had progressed to 32.12%. At the end of July 2019, civil construction was at 42.27%. At the end of October 2019, construction had progressed to 49.05%.

At the end of January 2020, construction had progressed to 54.93%. By the end of May 2020, construction had progressed to 62.42%. On 5 October 2020, TBM number 2 finished tunneling and reached Ramkhamhaeng 12 station box as part of contract 2. At the end of September 2020, was at 69.82%.

At the end of January 2021, construction had progressed to 76.09%. Construction progress was 81.03% by the end of April 2021. Construction progress was 87.24% by the end of October 2021. By the end of March 2022, construction progress was at 92.69%. By the end of May 2022, construction had progressed to 94.51%. As of March 23 2023, construction had progressed to 99.00%

By the end of June 2023, construction had progressed to 100.00%.

Contract	Notes	Contractor(s)	Kilometre	Cost
E1	OR13 Thailand Cultural Centre to OR16 Ramkhamhaeng 12	CKST Joint Venture	6.29	฿20,633.00 million
E2	OR16 Ramkhamhaeng 12 to OR19 Hua Mak	CKST Joint Venture	3.44	฿21,507.00 million
E3	OR19 Hua Mak to OR22 Klong Ban Ma	Italian-Thai Development	4.04	฿18,570.00 million
E4	OR22 Klong Ban Ma to OR29 Yaek Rom Klao	Unique Construction and Engineering	8.8	฿9,990.00 million
E5	Depot and Park & Ride	CKST Joint Venture		฿4,831.24 million
E6	Track and Electrical	Unique Construction and Engineering		฿3,690.00 million
Total Budget				฿79,221.24 million

=== Western section ===
The Phase 2 Western extension of the Orange line will run from Thailand Cultural Centre to Bang Khun Non via Pratunam. The 13.4 km (8.3 mi) western section will run underground with 12 stations.

The Thai Cabinet was expected to approve the 121 billion baht budget for the Western extension in mid 2017 with a tender due for the 2nd half of 2017. However, this decision was delayed until 2018 as Cabinet requested options to be considered for a joint public and private investment proposal. There were further delays into 2019, but the MRTA finalised a joint PPP plan for Cabinet to approve in mid 2019. On 28 January 2020, the Cabinet approved the 142 billion baht extension. It was originally expected to open in February 2026 and serve 439,000 passengers daily.

On 3 July 2020, the MRTA released the tender for the design, construction and operation of the Western extension as a Public-Private Partnership project on a 30 year lease. The tender deadline was 23 September 2020 with the successful bidder to be announced in early October 2020. The tender specified a construction period of three and a half years.

There were 10 tenderers that purchased the request for proposal (RFP) form with two major consortiums that submitted final bids:

- Bangkok Expressway and Metro Public Company Limited (BEM) - operator of the MRT Blue Line and MRT Purple Lines.
- BSR Consortium, led by Bangkok Mass Transit System Public Company Limited (BTSC), and supported by BTS Group Holdings (BTS Group) and Sino-Thai Engineering and Construction (STECON). BTSC is the operator of the MRT Pink Line and MRT Yellow Lines.

However, in late August 2020 the tender submission deadline was subsequently delayed by the MRTA. Thereafter, the MRTA amended the tender assessment criteria resulting in a lawsuit being lodged by the BTSC in the Administrative Court on 17 September 2020 with the Court imposing an injunction suspending the tender decision. The tender was subsequently cancelled by the MRTA in February 2021 due to litigation by the BTSC. After approval by the Administrative Court given ongoing litigation, a new tender issued in October has a deadline for bids of January 2022.

The Criminal Court Corruption and Malfeasance division hearings into the cancelled tender process were conducted from 14 to 24 December 2021 and have delayed the reissued tender timeframe. Subject to court approval, the MRTA planned to review all tender bids for a period of 3 months before seeking final Cabinet approval of the winning bid in April 2022. However, there are also construction budget concerns for the extension as steel prices have increased by 40% since the previous budget was approved. The EIA for the western extension was also updated in December 2021 as Din Daeng station was moved north by 500m, Pracha Songkhro station was moved east by 450m and Yommarat station was redesigned.

The MRTA reissued the new tender auction on 24 May 2022 with tender packages available for purchase until 10 June. The 141 billion baht western extension consists of 86 billion baht for civil works, 14 billion for land appropriation and 31 billion for systems installation, rolling stock and maintenance. The winning bidder was announced by the MRTA on 9 September 2022 with BEM winning the right to build and run the extension over the ITD consortium.

On 18 July 2024, construction contracts were signed at the MRTA office. The Minister of Transport, Suriya Juangroongruangkit, instructed MRTA and BEM, the concession holder, to expedite the track and electrical works on the Orange Line's eastern section from the Thailand Cultural Centre to Yaek Rom Klao for completion as soon as possible. The primary objective is to open the eastern section by early 2028, with the western section set to be completed ahead of schedule by November 2028. It was confirmed that the Orange Line’s maximum fare will be capped at 20 Baht or with a flat rate of 20 Baht for the entire route.

Contract	Notes	Contractor(s)	Kilometre (km)	Progress (June 2025)	Cost
1	OR02 Bang Khun Non to OR13 Thailand Cultural Centre	CKST-OL Consortium (consisting of CH. Karnchang and STECON Group)	13.1	11.87%	฿82,501.869 million
2	M&E Works and Rolling Stocks	CKST-OL Consortium (consisting of CH. Karnchang and STECON Group)		5.61%	฿26,714.000 million
Total Budget				11.15%	฿109,215.869 million

==== Discovery of human remains at Siriraj Station site ====
On March 18, 2025, archaeologists made a remarkable discovery during an excavation at the construction site of Siriraj Station. Over 70 human skeletons were unearthed beneath the Arun Amarin Bridge, opposite Wat Amarin, along with a large ceramic jar containing cremated bone fragments. This discovery, made as part of a mandated archaeological survey by the Fine Arts Department prior to the Siriraj hospital expansion, has drawn significant attention from historians and researchers.

The burials show unique and previously unrecorded characteristics in Thai archaeology: bodies were laid in an extended position with slightly bent legs, heads oriented westward, and faces tilted southward. Some of the remains were found in alarming postures with hands and feet bound behind their backs, suggesting possible mass execution.

Preliminary assessments date the remains to approximately 200–500 years ago, potentially linking them to the Thonburi period. Experts speculate that this site may be tied to mass executions during the turbulent years before the establishment of Bangkok as the capital in 1782. However, further bone dating and DNA testing are required to confirm the period and possible links to pre-Rattanakosin communities.

The site itself lies within a historically significant area once part of Wang Lang Palace, built around 200 years ago, and may overlap with an ancient settlement dating back 2,000–3,000 years. The discovery of numerous cremation jars alongside the skeletons suggests complex and varied mortuary practices, indicating cultural and ritual significance.

The Mass Rapid Transit Authority of Thailand has confirmed the site is under continued investigation by the Fine Arts Department. If further research verifies early historical connections, the discovery could significantly reshape the understanding of Thonburi’s and Bangkok’s origins.

== Rolling stock ==
The tender for operation of the line and purchase of rolling stock for both the eastern and western sections was issued in May 2022, along with the construction of the western section. However, it was delayed due to the ongoing litigation regarding the western extension, and the tender was suspended. In July 2024, it was announced at the signing ceremony of the joint investment contract for the Orange Line that they planned to have 32 electric trains, each with three carriages.

In October 2024, BEM has concluded its selection by choosing Siemens as the manufacturer for the Orange Line trains. The turnkey contract was announced on December 18, 2024. A consortium consisting of Siemens, Bozankaya, and ST Engineering Thailand won a contract from Ch. Karnchang. The contract includes the supply of 32 Siemens three-car trains, with the configuration and design same as the EMU-BLE fleet used on the MRT Blue Line in Bangkok. These trains will be manufactured at the Bozankaya Factory in Ankara, Turkey. Siemens and ST Engineering will supply the bogies, traction, braking, auxiliary systems, and SCADA system for the project, and will be responsible for project management, development, construction, and commissioning. Siemens will also provide service and maintenance for 10 years.

== Stations ==
Code	Station Name		Opened	Platform Type	Position	Park & Ride	Transfer	Notes
Code	English	Thai	Opened	Platform Type	Position	Park & Ride	Transfer	Notes
Taling Chan - Bang Khun Non: 4.54 km (Future)
OR01	Taling Chan	ตลิ่งชัน	TBA	Island	Underground	-	Connecting station to; • BTS (1 km walking distance; future)• SRT • SRT Southern Line	Appeared on the 2022 Final Reports.
Bang Khun Non - Thailand Cultural Centre: 13.2 km (Under construction)
OR02	Bang Khun Non	บางขุนนนท์	2029; 3 years' time	Island	Underground	-	Connecting station to; • MRT • SRT (future)	
OR03	Siriraj	ศิริราช	2029; 3 years' time	Stacked	Underground	-	Connecting station with SRT (future)	Exit to Siriraj Hospital.
OR04	Sanam Luang	สนามหลวง	2029; 3 years' time	Island	Underground	-		Exit to: • Sanam Luang • The Grand Palace • Khaosan Road • National Theatre
OR05	Democracy Monument	อนุสาวรีย์ประชาธิปไตย	2029; 3 years' time	Island	Underground	-	Interchange station to MRT (under construction)	Exit to: • Mahakan fort • Rattanakosin Exhibition Hall • Queen Sirikit Gallery • Royal Pavilion Mahajetsadabadin • Wat Saket.
OR06	Lan Luang	หลานหลวง	2029; 3 years' time	Island	Underground	-		
OR07	Yommarat	ยมราช	2029; 3 years' time	Island	Underground	-	Connecting station to SRT (future)	
OR08	Ratchathewi	ราชเทวี	2029; 3 years' time	Island	Underground	-	Connecting station to BTS	
OR09	Pratunam	ประตูน้ำ	2029; 3 years' time	Stacked	Underground	-		Exit to: • Embassy of Indonesia • Pratunam • Platinum Fashion Mall.
OR10	Ratchaprarop	ราชปรารภ	2029; 3 years' time	Stacked	Underground	-	Connecting station to • ARL • SRT (future) • SRT Eastern Line	Exit to: • Pratunam Market • Indra Square • Baiyoke Tower. The station site has been moved 300 meters north to replace Rangnam station.
OR11	Din Daeng	ดินแดง	2029; 3 years' time	Island	Underground	-		Exit to Bangkok City Hall 2.
OR12	Pracha Songkhro	ประชาสงเคราะห์	2029; 3 years' time	Side	Underground	-	Connecting station to MRL (future)	
Thailand Cultural Centre - Yaek Rom Klao: 21.04 km (Structure Complete)
OR13	Thailand Cultural Centre	ศูนย์วัฒนธรรมแห่งประเทศไทย	2027; 1 year's time	Side	Underground	√	Interchange station to MRT	Exit to: • The One Ratchada Market • Esplanade Ratchada • The Street Ratchada • China Cultural Centre • Thailand Cultural Centre.
OR14	MRTA	รฟม.	2027; 1 year's time	Island	Underground	-		Exit to Royal City Avenue (RCA).
OR15	Wat Phra Ram 9	วัดพระราม 9	2027; 1 year's time	Stacked	Underground	-	Connecting station to MRL (future)	Formerly Pradit Manutham.
OR16	Ramkhamhaeng 12	รามคำแหง 12	2027; 1 year's time	Stacked	Underground	-		Exit to The Mall Ramkhamhaeng.
OR17	Ramkhamhaeng University	มหาวิทยาลัยรามคำแหง	2027; 1 year's time	Stacked	Underground	-		Exit to Ramkhamhaeng University. Formerly Ramkhamhaeng.
OR18	SAT	กกท.	2027; 1 year's time	Island	Underground	-		Exit to: • Hua Mak Sports Complex (which includes the head office of SAT (Sports Authority of Thailand), Rajamangala Stadium and Indoor Stadium Huamark)
OR19	Ramkhamhaeng 40	รามคำแหง 40	2027; 1 year's time	Island	Underground	-		Formerly Hua Mak and Ramkhamhaeng 34.
OR20	Yaek Lam Sali	แยกลำสาลี	2027; 1 year's time	Island	Underground	-	Connecting station to; • MRT • MRT (future)	Formerly Lam Sali.
OR21	Si Burapha	ศรีบูรพา	2027; 1 year's time	Island	Underground	-		
OR22	Khlong Ban Ma	คลองบ้านม้า	2027; 1 year's time	Side	Underground	√		
OR23	Sammakorn	สัมมากร	2027; 1 year's time	Side	Elevated	-		
OR24	Nom Klao	น้อมเกล้า	2027; 1 year's time	Side	Elevated	-		
OR25	Rat Phatthana	ราษฎร์พัฒนา	2027; 1 year's time	Side	Elevated	-		
OR26	Min Phatthana	มีนพัฒนา	2027; 1 year's time	Side	Elevated	-		
OR27	Kheha Ramkhamhaeng	เคหะรามคำแหง	2027; 1 year's time	Side	Elevated	-		
OR28	Min Buri	มีนบุรี	2027; 1 year's time	Side	Elevated	√	Interchange station with MRT	
OR29	Yaek Rom Klao	แยกร่มเกล้า	2027; 1 year's time	Side	Elevated	-		Formerly Suwinthawong.

Note: In February 2020, the MRTA changed the names of 3 stations OR19 , OR20 , and OR29 .

== Incidents ==
On 19 May 2025, a 50-year-old construction worker died after falling into a 19-metre-deep excavation shaft at the Lan Luang Station construction site in Bangkok. His body was recovered on 24 May, following five days of continuous search and recovery operations. The incident prompted an official investigation by the Mass Rapid Transit Authority of Thailand (MRTA) and reignited public concern over occupational safety and regulatory oversight on large-scale infrastructure projects.

== Network map ==
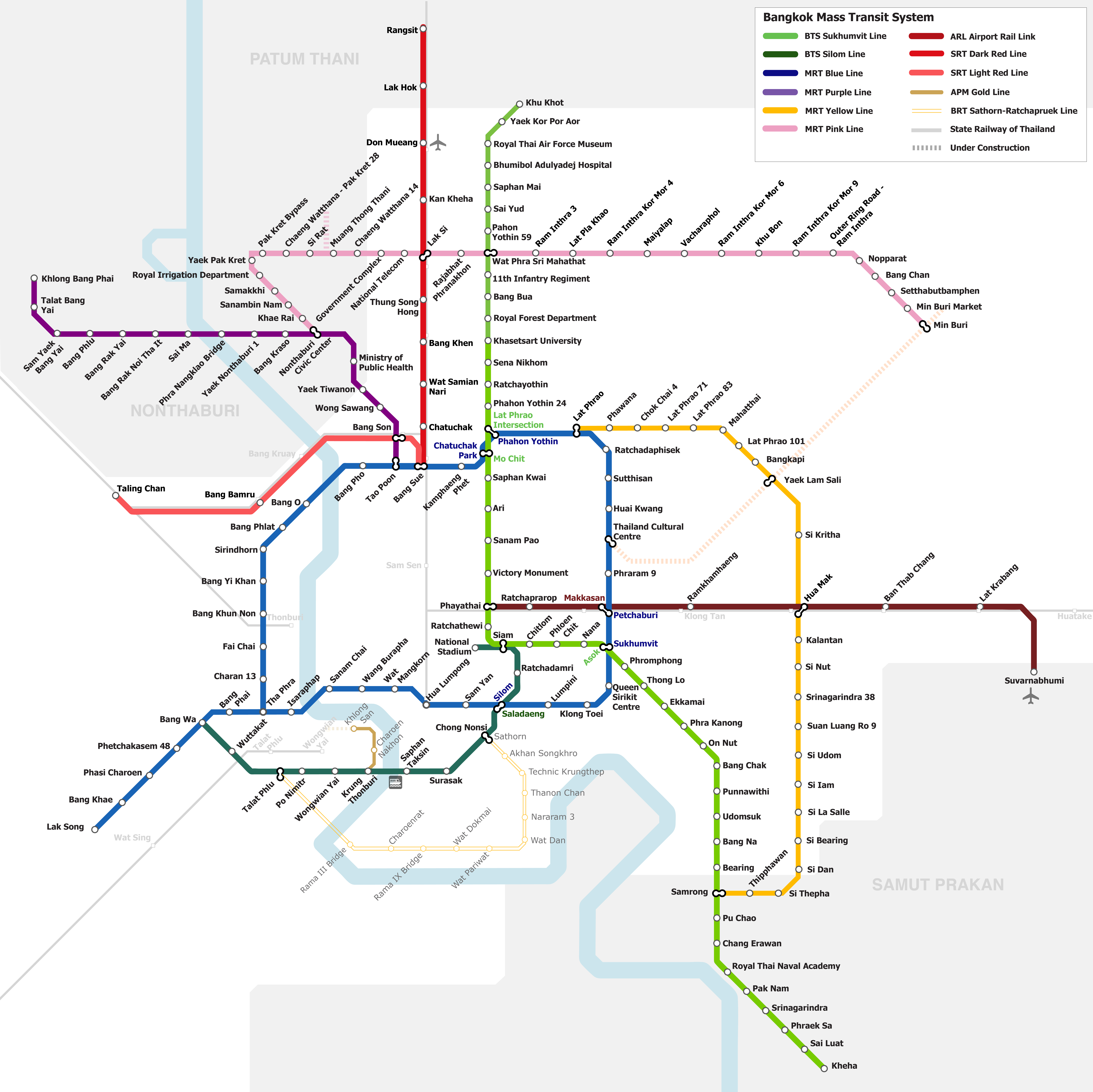

== See also ==
- Mass Rapid Transit Master Plan in Bangkok Metropolitan Region
- MRT (Bangkok)
- MRT Blue Line
- MRT Brown Line
- MRT Grey Line
- MRT Light Blue Line
- MRT Pink Line
- MRT Purple Line
- MRT Yellow Line
- BTS Skytrain
- Sukhumvit Line
- Silom Line
- Airport Rail Link (Bangkok)
- SRT Dark Red Line
- SRT Light Red Line
- Bangkok BRT
- BMA Gold Line
- BMA Bang Na-Airport Line
