= Huai Khwang MRT station =

MRT station on Blue Line in Bangkok, Thailand

Coordinates: 13.7786°N 100.5740°E

ห้วยขวาง Huai Khwang
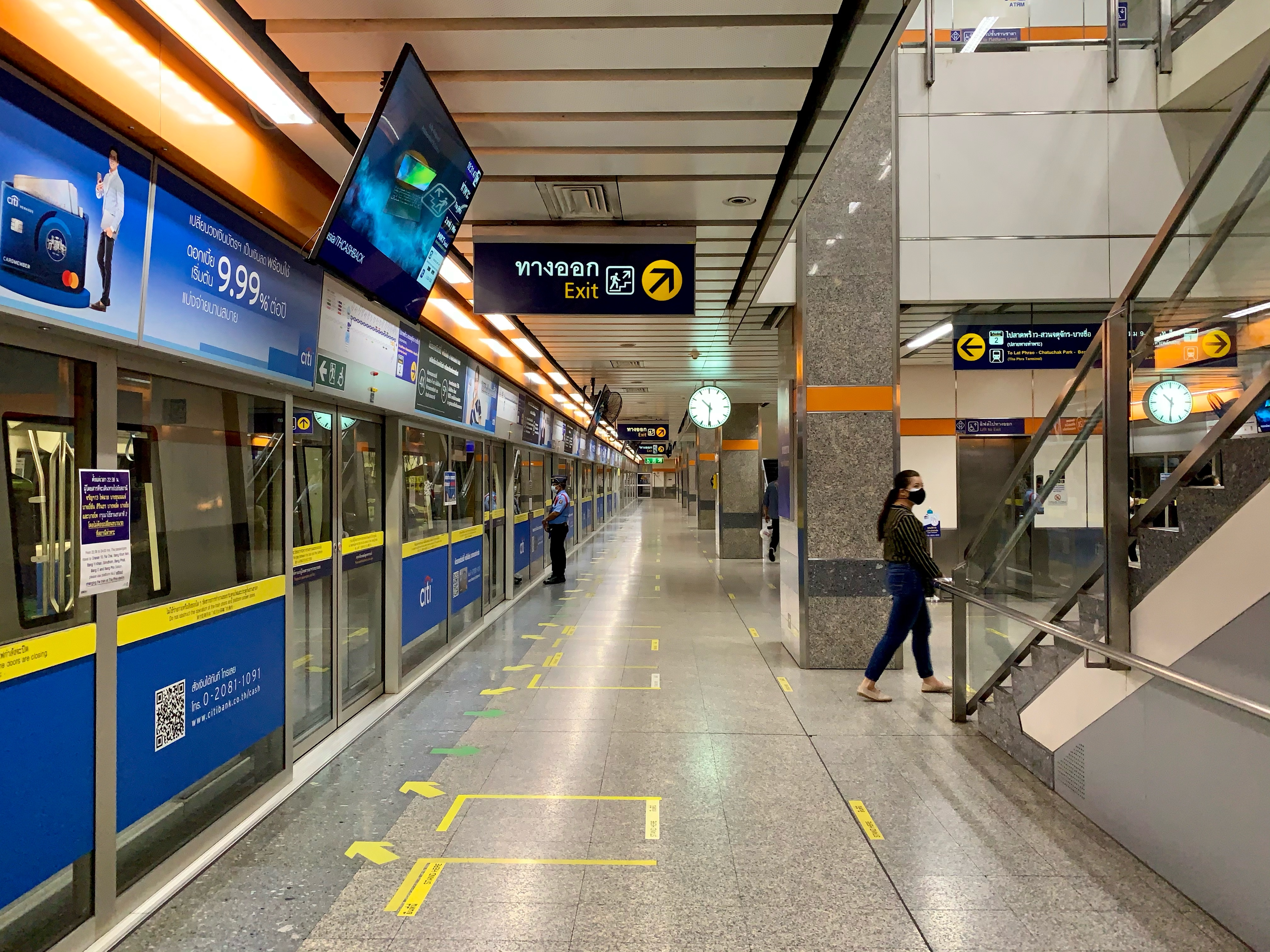
- Platform of Huai Khwang

General information
- Location: Din Daeng and Huai Khwang, Bangkok, Thailand
- System: MRT
- Owner: Mass Rapid Transit Authority of Thailand (MRTA)
- Operator: Bangkok Expressway and Metro Public Company Limited (BEM)
- Line: MRT Blue Line
- Platforms: 1 island platform
- Tracks: 2

Construction
- Structure type: Underground
- Accessible: yes

Other information
- Station code: BL18

History
- Opened: 3 July 2004; 22 years ago
- Former names: Pracha Rat Bamphen

Passengers
- 2021: 4,981,804

Services
Preceding station	Metropolitan Rapid Transit	Following station
Thailand Cultural Centre towards Lak Song	Blue Line	Sutthisan towards Tha Phra via Bang Sue
Location

Huai Khwang station (Thai: สถานีห้วยขวาง, pronounced [sā.tʰǎː.nīː hûa̯j kʰwǎːŋ]; code BL18) is a MRT station on the Blue Line in Bangkok, Thailand. It is located under Ratchadaphisek Road, near the MRT Depot. Before the station's opening, the plan was to name it Pracha Rat Bamphen. The name was changed to Huai Khwang later. The station's symbol is color orange.

== Station layout ==
G	-	Bus stop
B1	Basement	Exits 1–4
B2	Concourse	Ticket machines
B3	Platform 2	Blue towards Tha Phra via Bang Sue (Sutthisan)
B3	Island platform, doors will open on the right
B3	Platform 1	Blue towards Lak Song (Thailand Cultural Centre)

== Station details ==
Huai Khwang is underground station, widths 23 metres (75 ft), lengths 226 metres (741 ft), depths 19 metres (62 ft), and use island platform.

There is MetroMall in the station, but not opened yet.
