= Thailand Cultural Centre =

Performing arts venue in Bangkok, Thailand

Coordinates: 13°46′0″N 100°34′26″E

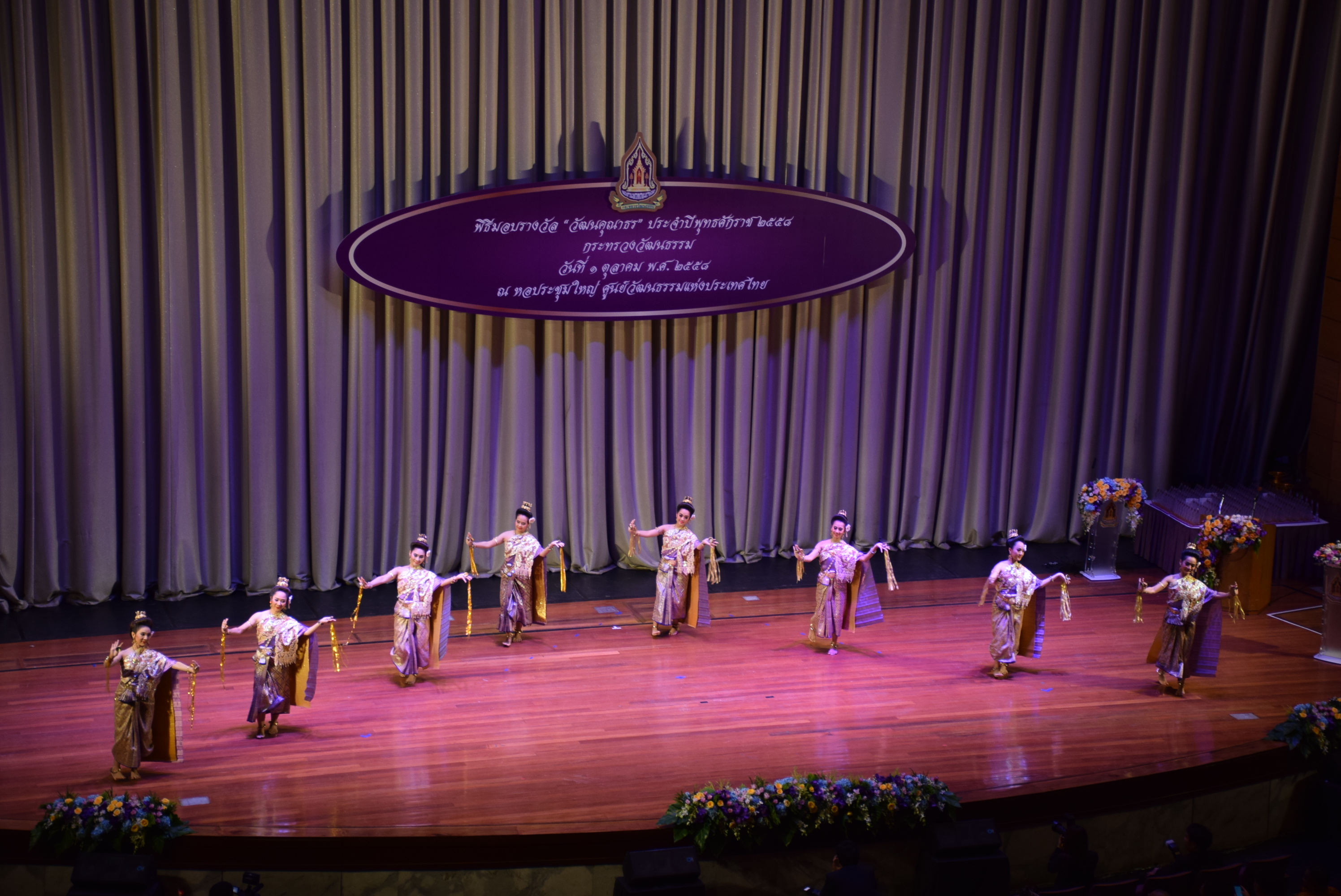
Thailand Cultural Centre

The Thailand Cultural Centre (Thai: ศูนย์วัฒนธรรมแห่งประเทศไทย) is a performing arts venue in Huai Khwang district, Bangkok, Thailand. It was opened on 9 October 1987. It is the provenance of Thailand Cultural Centre MRT station, a station on the MRT Blue Line. The station is located under Ratchadaphisek Road and will become an interchange station with the Orange Line.

== History ==
Built with a grant from Japan, the Thailand Cultural Centre opened on 9 October 1987 as part of celebrations for King Bhumibol's 60th birthday.

== Facilities ==
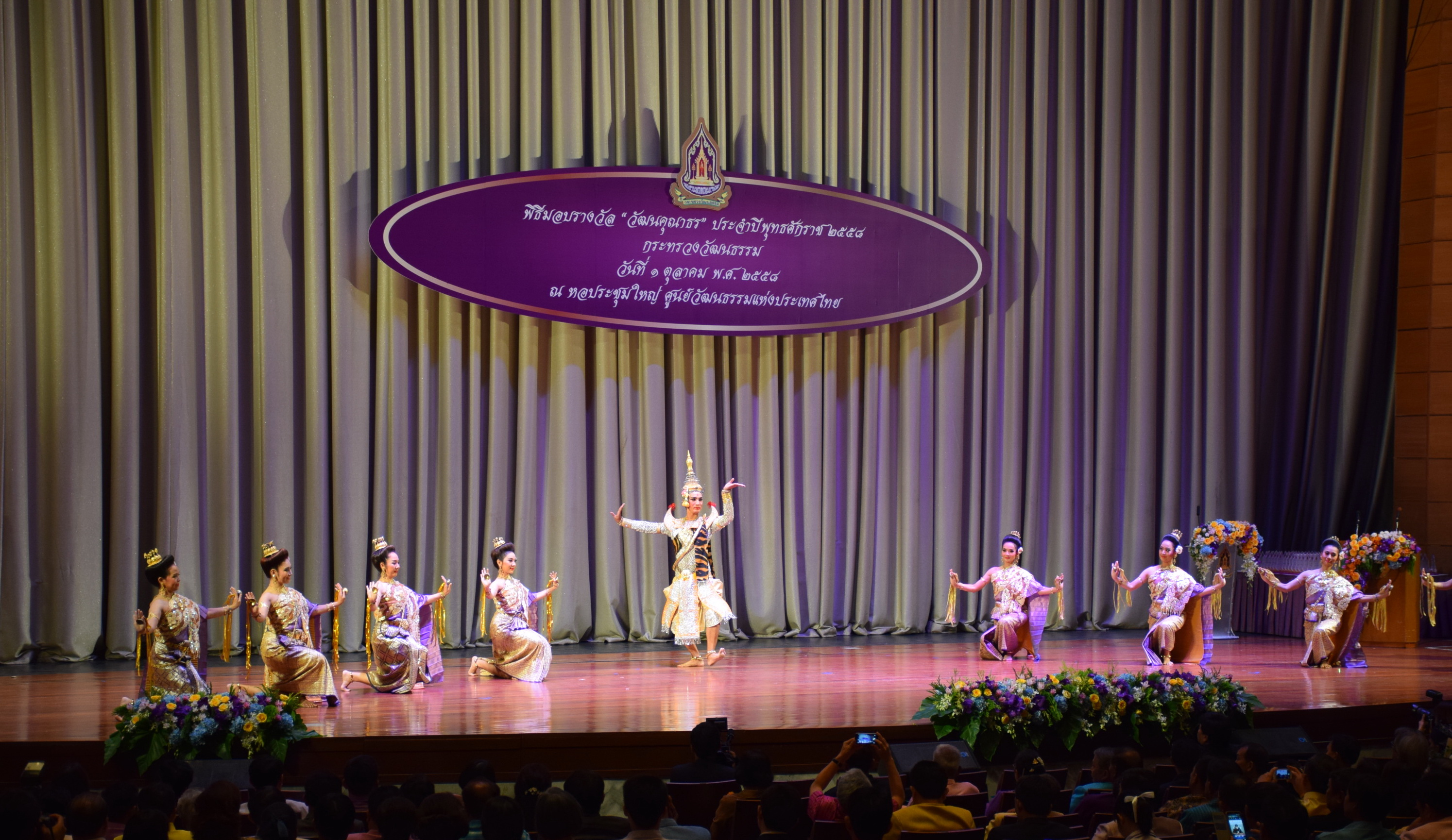
Thailand Cultural Centre

The venue consists of two auditoriums and one outdoor stage and is used for various live performances year round. The main hall is a 2,000-seat auditorium, and is used for stage presentations, concerts, and conferences. The small hall is a 500-seat multi-purpose auditorium, which is integrated with a 1,000-seat outdoor amphitheater. The Social Education and Exhibition Building accommodates a cultural library and the Thai Life Permanent Exhibition. There is also a Japanese Pavilion and a Thai Pavilion.

== Location ==
The centre is on 14 Thiam Ruam Mit Road, close to the junction with Ratchadaphisek Road, in the Huai Khwang District.
