= Bang Khun Non MRT station =

Thai rapid transit stop in Bangkok

บางขุนนนท์ Bang Khun Non
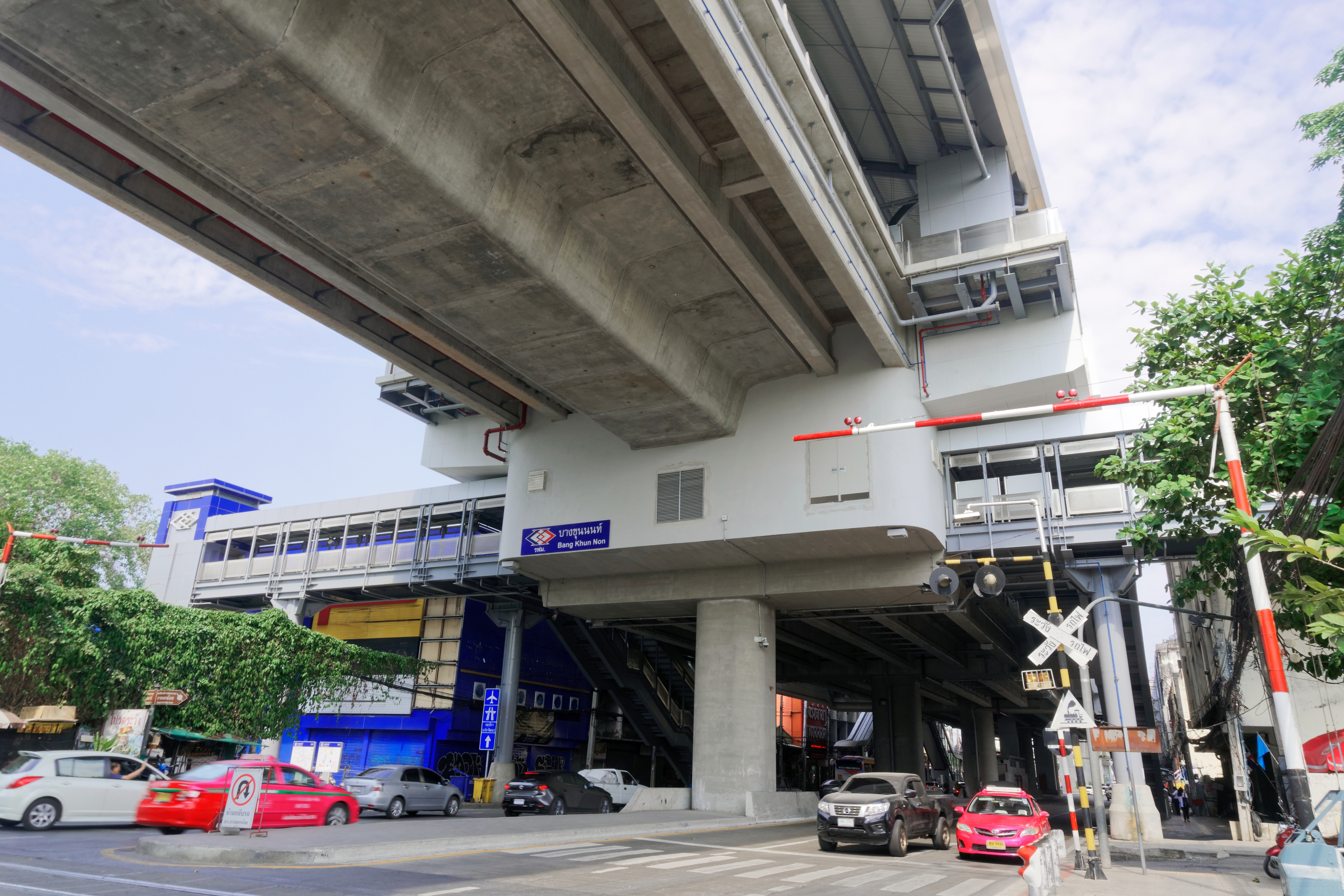

General information
- Location: Bangkok Noi, Bangkok, Thailand
- Coordinates: 13.7633°N 100.4732°E
- System: MRT MRT
- Owner: Mass Rapid Transit Authority of Thailand (MRTA)
- Operator: Bangkok Expressway and Metro Public Company Limited (BEM)
- Lines: MRT MRT Blue line MRT MRT Orange line (future)
- Platforms: 2 side platforms
- Tracks: 2
- Connections: State Railway of Thailand (Charansanitwong Halt)

Construction
- Structure type: Elevated
- Parking: No

Other information
- Station code: BL04; OR02

History
- Opened: 23 December 2019; 6 years ago

Passengers
- 2021: 1,087,281

Services
Preceding station	Metropolitan Rapid Transit	Following station
Bang Yi Khan towards Lak Song	Blue Line	Fai Chai towards Tha Phra
Under construction
Taling Chan Terminus	Orange Line	Siriraj towards Yaek Rom Klao
Location

Bang Khun Non station (Thai: สถานีบางขุนนนท์), is an elevated railway station on MRT Blue Line, serving the Bangkok Metropolitan Region in Thailand. The station opened on 23 December 2019. The station is one of the nine stations of phase 3 of MRT Blue Line.

In the future, it will become an interchange station for the MRT Orange Line following the opening of the western extension in 2030.

The station is located southward of Bang Khun Nont Junction in the three areas of Bangkok Noi District: Bang Khun Non, Bang Khun Si and Ban Chang Lo above Charan Sanitwong Road, where Charan Sanitwong cuts across Sutthawat Roads and Southern Railway Line from nearby Thon Buri railway station, and it has a connection to the State Railway of Thailand Southern Railway Line at Charansanitwong Halt, although it is not classified as an interchange on MRT maps.

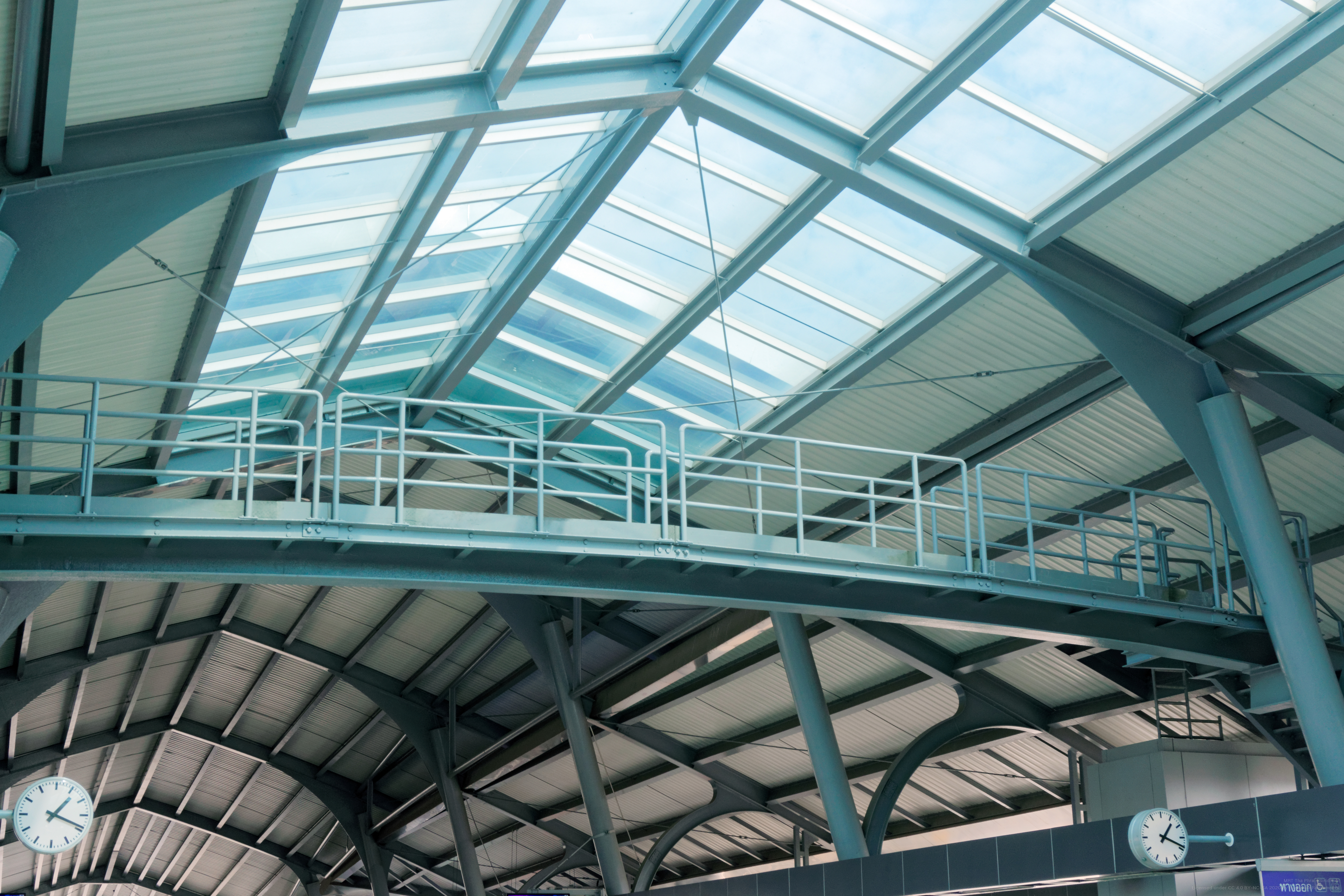
Bang Khun Non station's viaduct

In addition, Bang Khun Non station has a unique feature: a viaduct crossing above the platforms and tracks. It was built to facilitate the procession of the Buddha's relics during the annual Chak Phra Festival in November, a long-standing local tradition in the Thonburi area. As the relics are sacred, they must not pass under any bridge or road. Remarkably, only Bang Khun Non and Bang Phai stations have this feature, making them architecturally and culturally distinct from all others.
