= Siriraj Hospital =

Public hospital in Bangkok, Thailand

Coordinates: 13°45′29″N 100°29′09″E

Siriraj Hospital โรงพยาบาลศิริราช
- Siriraj Hospital

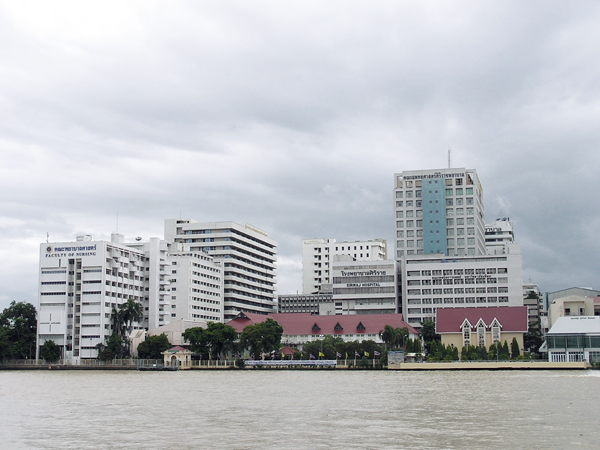
- Siriraj Hospital, Bangkok, the oldest and largest hospital in Thailand

Geography
- Location: Bangkok, Thailand

Organisation
- Care system: National Health Insurance System
- Type: Teaching, General
- Affiliated university: Faculty of Medicine Siriraj Hospital, Mahidol University
- Patron: King Chulalongkorn

Services
- Emergency department: Yes
- Beds: 2,145

History
- Founded: 26 April 1888

Links
- Website: www2.si.mahidol.ac.th/en/
- Lists: Hospitals in Thailand

Siriraj Hospital (Thai: โรงพยาบาลศิริราช; RTGS: Rong Phayaban Sirirat) is the oldest and largest public hospital in Bangkok, Thailand on the west bank of the Chao Phraya River, opposite Thammasat University's Tha Phrachan campus. It is the primary teaching hospital of the Faculty of Medicine Siriraj Hospital, Mahidol University at Bangkok.

== Description ==
With a capacity of more than 2,000 beds and visited by more than three million patients per year, Siriraj is one of the largest and busiest medical centers in Southeast Asia. The medical school accepts about 250 medical students and more than 100 for postgraduate residency training each year. Siriraj is the largest public hospital in Thailand. The hospital is generally regarded as one of the final referral centers for complicated and rare diseases from all hospitals in Thailand.

The logo of the Siriraj Hospital is the Naga curled into a shape of "ศ" (pronounce as "Sor-Sala"), the first Thai alphabet of the hospital name with the Royal Diadem on top of the Naga.

The nearby Siriraj Station is under-construction and is expected to open in 2030 as an integrated building of the hospital.

== History ==
Siriraj Hospital from Chao Phraya River

The hospital was founded by King Chulalongkorn in 1888, two years after a worldwide cholera outbreak. It is named after the king's then 18-month-old son, Prince Siriraj Kakudhabhand, who had died from dysentery a year before the opening of the hospital. The medical school was established two years later in 1890.

Siriraj was the residence of King Bhumibol Adulyadej in the final years of his reign. He was first admitted to the hospital in 2009 for a respiratory condition and remained there intermittently until his death in 2016. His grandson, Prince Dipangkorn Rasmijoti, was born at the hospital in 2005.

== Museums ==
There are seven medical museums at Siriraj Hospital. They are the Siriraj Bimuksthan Museum, Ellis Pathological Museum, Congdons Anatomical Museum, Songkran Niyomsan Forensic Medicine Museum, Parasitological Museum, Touch Museum in Honor of Queen Mother Sirikit, and Sood Sangvichien Prehistoric Museum Laboratory. The permanent exhibits include sections on anatomy, pathology, congenital disorders, toxicology, techniques of Thai traditional medicine, and forensic pathology.

In 2008, the temporary exhibit featured the role of Siriraj Hospital. The latest museum is Siriraj Bimuksthan Museum, opened in early 2013. The museum is housed in the renovated vintage architecture of the old Bangkok Noi railway station, next to Siriraj's newly opened private subsidiary Siriraj Piyamaharajkarun Hospital. The museum exhibits history of medicine in Thailand from traditional medicine to modern, and includes history of the Bangkok Noi area where the museum and the hospital are situated.

== See also ==
- Siriraj Piyamaharajkarun Hospital
- Siriraj MRT station
- Health in Thailand
- Hospitals in Thailand
- List of hospitals in Thailand
- List of hospitals in Bangkok
