= Wat Kharuehabodi =

- วัดคฤหบดี
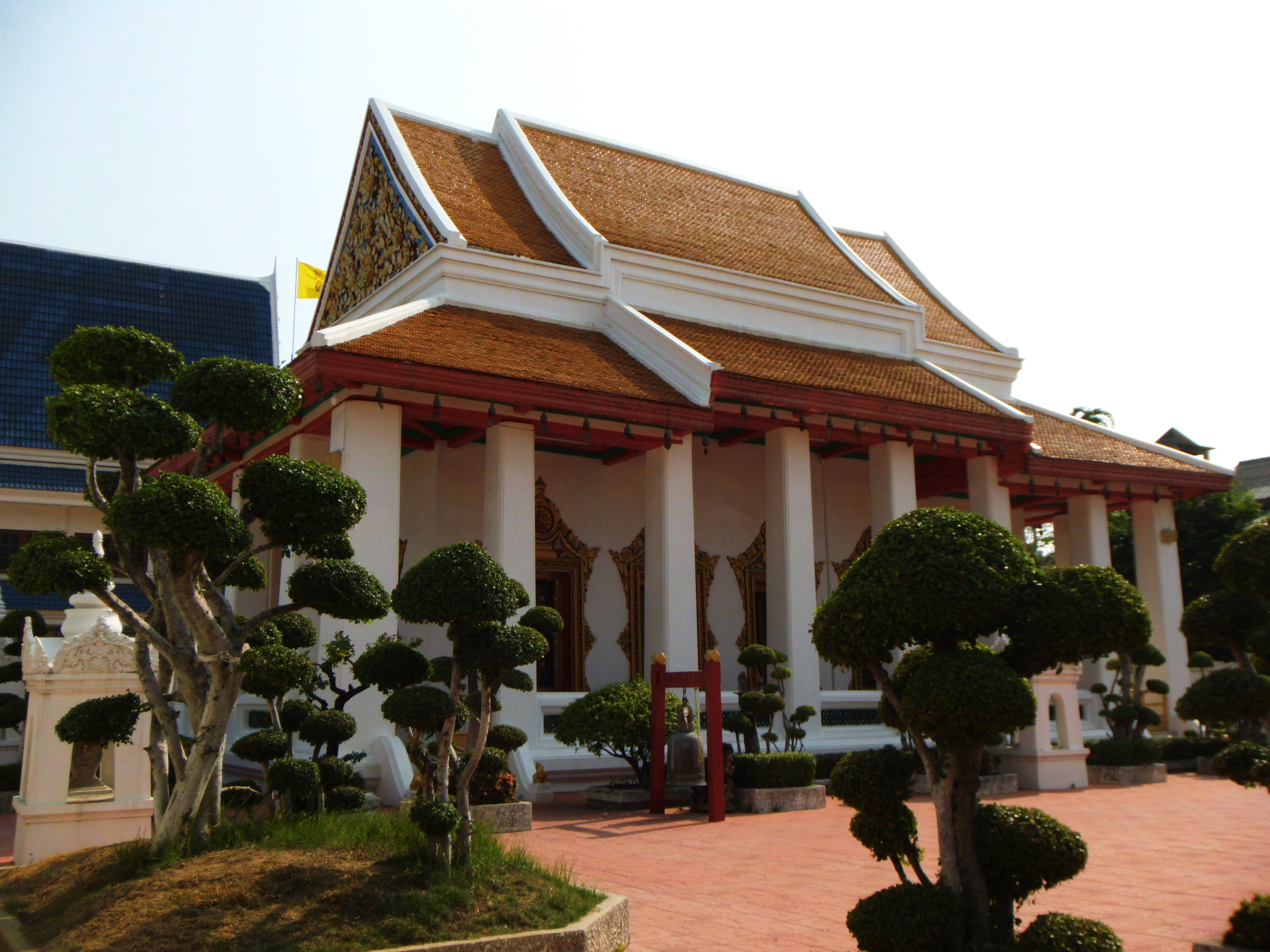
- The ordination hall

- Location within Bangkok

Religion
- Affiliation: Buddhism
- Sect: Theravāda Mahā Nikāya
- Status: Third-class royal temple

Location
- Location: 489 Soi Charansanitwong 44, Bang Yi Khan, Bang Phlat, Bangkok 10700
- Country: Thailand
- Interactive map of Wat Kharuehabodi
- Coordinates: 13.77228°N 100.49584°E

Architecture
- Founder: Phraya Ratchamontri Borirak (Phu)

Wat Kharuehabodi (Thai: วัดคฤหบดี) is a Thai Buddhist temple by the Chao Phraya river in the Thonburi's Bang Phlat district, Bangkok.

== History ==
The temple would be classified as a third-class royal monastery. Phraya Ratchamontri Borirak (Phu), the origin of Pamornmontri family (whose descendants include father and son politician Prayoon Pamornmontri and Yuranan Pamornmontri) had received a new house from the King Rama III. It was the one which Phrasri Sunthorn Woharn (Sunthorn Phu) ever lived before. He therefore donated his land together with the old house to build the temple in dedication to the king.

The temple then was named Wat Kharuehabodi, which means "millionaire temple".

In front of the monastery, there is a twelve indented corners chedi of circular bell shape (which is a popular architectural style in Sri Lanka), built by the end of the King Rama III's reign. This is a big temple having a beautiful lay-out plan, especially when observed from the front approach.

In addition, in the area of the temple by the Chao Phraya river. It is also the location of a strangely shaped golden chedi. The inside contains what are believed to be the sacred relics of The Buddha. It was built in 2004.

== Principal Buddha image ==
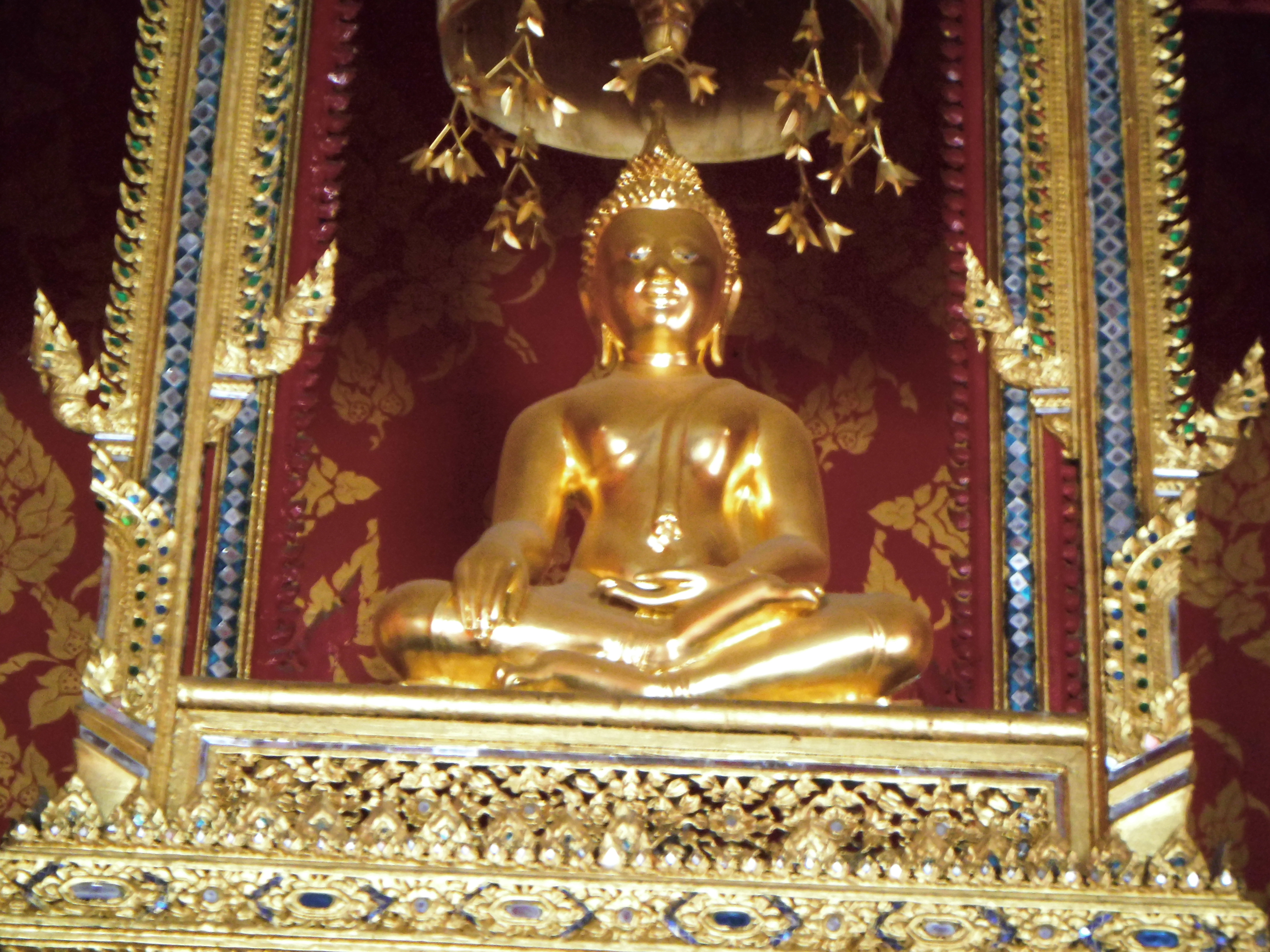
Phra Saekkham

There are many legends about the origin of Phra Saekkham (พระแซกคำ, Lao: ພຣະແຊກຄໍາ), the principal Buddha image of this temple. The Maravijaya attitude image was said to be created during the Queen Camadevi's reign, the first ruler of Haripuñjaya. Its ownership passed through the hands of various kingdoms, from Lan Na to Lan Xang to Vientiane.

Stories diverge on how the image was taken from Vientiane to Siam. It was either taken during the Lao–Siamese War (1778–1779) or during the Lao rebellion (1826–1828). The image was later given to the temple by King Rama III.

Phra Saekkham is referred to in the motto of the Bang Phlat district.

== Location ==
Wat Kharuehabodi is lined at the end of Soi Charansanitwong 44, Bang Yi Khan subdistrict, Bang Phlat district, Bangkok.
