= Charan Sanit Wong Road =

Road in Bangkok, Thailand

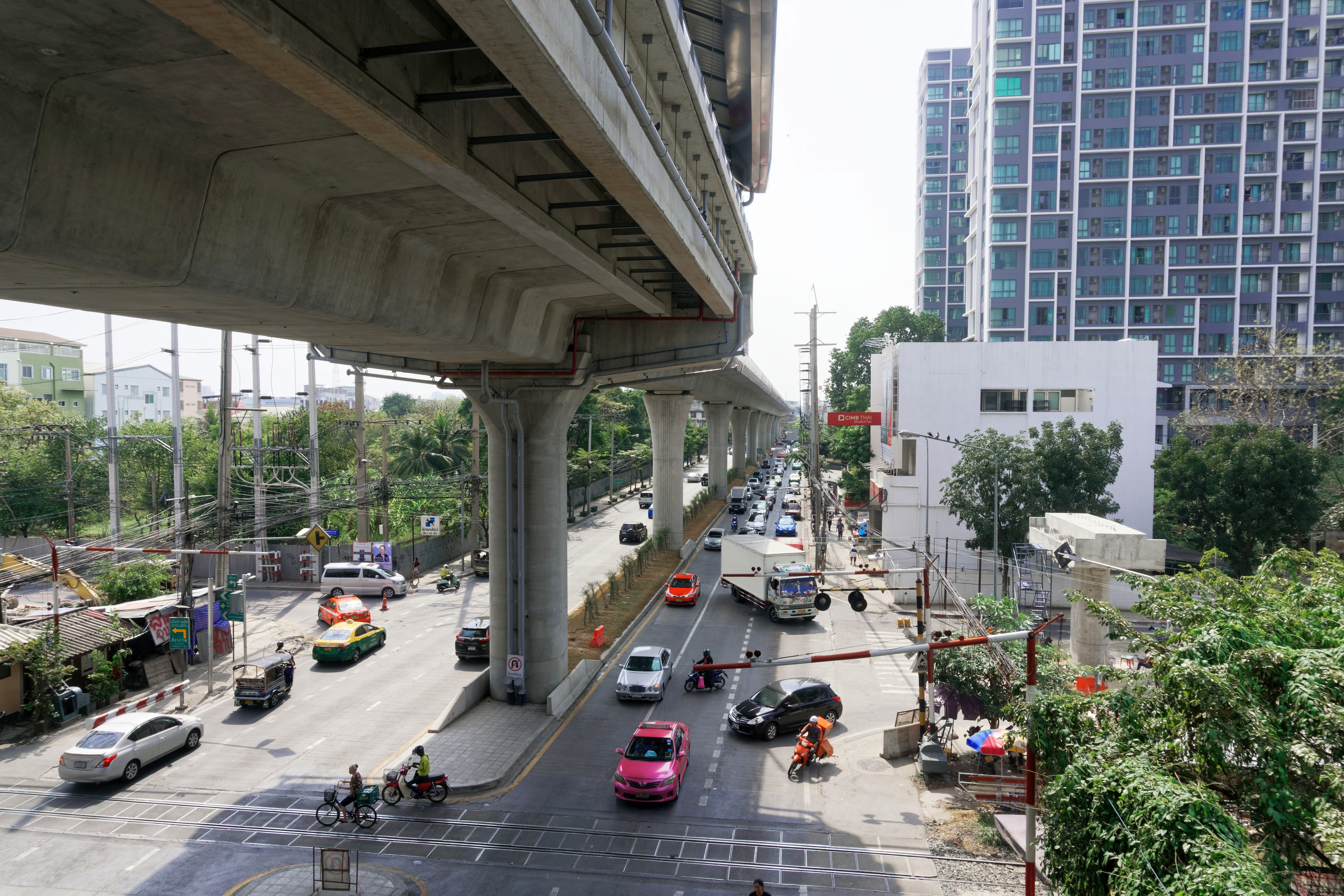
- Charan Sanit Wong Road in late 2019 near Charansanitwong Railway Halt and Bang Khun Non MRT Station under construction
- Interactive map of Charan Sanit Wong Road
- Native name: ถนนจรัญสนิทวงศ์
- Namesake: Luang Charan Sanitwong (ML Charan Sanitwong)
- Location: Bangkok and Nonthaburi, Thailand
- Coordinates: 13°46′09″N 100°29′30″E
- South end: Phet Kasem Road, Tha Phra
- Northesat end: Rama VII Bridge, Nonthaburi

Charan Sanit Wong Road (Thai: ถนนจรัญสนิทวงศ์, pronounced [tʰā.nǒn t͡ɕā.rān sā.nìt wōŋ]) is a main road on Bangkok's Thonburi side (the west bank of the Chao Phraya River). It is named in honour of Luang Charan Sanitwong (ML Charan Sanitwong : th:หม่อมหลวงจรัญ สนิทวงศ์), former Permanent Secretary of the Ministry of Transport. Its name has often been misspelled as จรัลสนิทวงศ์ in Thai, according to the 1999 Royal Institute Dictionary.

The road passes through three districts of Bangkok: Bangkok Yai, Bangkok Noi, and Bang Phlat. It begins at Phet Kasem Road (Highway 4) at Tha Phra Intersection near Tha Phra MRT station. From there, it runs northwest past Wat Tha Phra, Tha Phra Police Station, the Consulate of the Kingdom of Lesotho, Wat Chao Mun, Siam Technological College, Sesawech Vidhaya School, and the entrance to Wat Di Duad (Soi Charan Sanitwong 12). It crosses Phanitchayakan Thon Buri Road (Soi Charan Sanitwong 13) at Phanitchayakan Thon Buri Junction, then continues across Khlong Mon, passing Wat Pho Riang and Wat Bang Sao Thong, as well as the Metropolitan Electricity Authority (MEA) Thon Buri Office.

Further along, the road intersects at Fai Chai Intersection, meeting Phran Nok Road and Phutthamonthon Sai 4–Phran Nok Road. It then bends northeast, passing Bang Khun Si Market, Makro Charan Sanitwong Branch, and Charansanitwong Railway Halt in the Bang Khun Non area. It also passes the Bang Khun Non Junction and the historic Wat Suwannaram, before crossing Khlong Bangkok Noi near Wat Si Sudaram (formerly Wat Chi Pa Kao).

The road continues to Borommaratchachonnani Intersection, meeting Borommaratchachonnani Road and Somdet Phra Pinklao Road at the border between Arun Amarin (Bangkok Noi) and Bang Bamru–Bang Yi Khan (Bang Phlat), near the two major department stores PATA and Central Plaza Pinklao, beneath the Borommaratchachonnani Elevated Highway. From this point, it fully enters Bang Phlat District, passing Phong Sap Market and Wat Ruak Bang Bamru, before reaching Bang Phlat Intersection, where it connects with Sirindhorn Road and Ratchawithi Road, close to Wat Sing and Krung Thon Bridge. This section runs roughly parallel to Samsen Road on the Phra Nakhon side (east bank of the Chao Phraya River).

The road then heads northeast across Khlong Bang Phlat into the Bang O area, passing Yanhee Hospital and Wimuttayarampittayakorn School, before terminating at the foot of Rama VII Bridge in Bang Kruai District, Nonthaburi Province.

At present, the entire length of Charan Sanitwong Road is served by the MRT Blue Line extension (Bang Sue–Tha Phra), which has been in operation since 2020.

In the Bang Phlat area, through which the road runs, there are also two communities that still conserve traditional Thai ways of life and local cultural arts: Soi Charan Sanitwong 71, where Khon masks are created by hand using traditional methods, and Soi Charan Sanitwong 89 (also known as the Saeng Thong Community), where a local elderly angklung band is still active today. In Soi Charan Sanitwong 86 stands the historic Masjid Bang O, a rare and beautiful mosque whose architecture blends Renaissance, Baroque, and Indian influences. Additionally, Soi Charan Sanitwong 27 (also known as Soi Buppha Sawan) was once the centre of Thailand's luk thung (Thai country music) scene during the 1960s and 1970s, home to many music agents and bands of the era.
