= Bang Phlat district =

Вang Phlat บางพลัด
- Khet
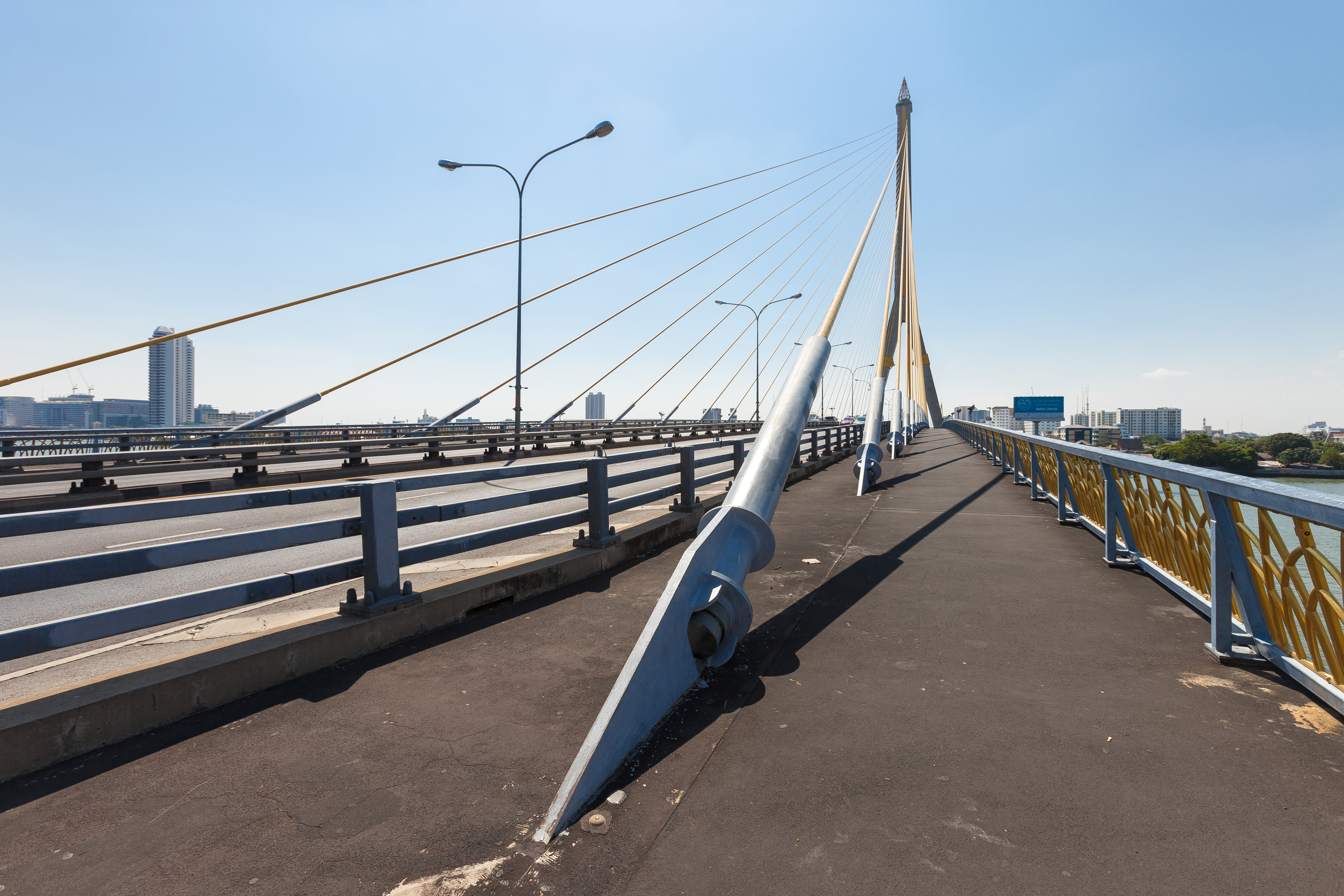
- Rama VIII Bridge (from Phra Nakhon side looking towards Bang Phlat)
- Etymology: Lost place
- Motto: Precious Phra Sak Kham, regatta Chao Phraya, beautiful and elegant Rama VIII.
- Khet location in Bangkok
- Coordinates: 13°47′38″N 100°30′18″E
- Country: Thailand
- Province: Bangkok
- Seat: Bang O
- Khwaeng: 4
- Khet established: 1987

Area
  - Total: 11.360 km^{2} (4.386 sq mi)

Population (2017)
  - Total: 92,325
  - Density: 8,127.2/km^{2} (21,049/sq mi)
- Time zone: UTC+7 (ICT)
- Postal code: 10700
- Geocode: 1025

Bang Phlat (Thai: บางพลัด, pronounced [bāːŋ pʰlát]) is one of the 50 districts (khet) of Bangkok, Thailand. Its neighboring districts, clockwise from the north, are Bang Kruai district, Bang Sue, Dusit, Phra Nakhon, Bangkok Noi, and Taling Chan.

== History ==
Bang Phlat was one of the 25 districts created in 1915, when the inner districts of Bangkok were reorganized. In 1938 the district was abolished and added to Bangkok Noi.

Bang Phlat district was again set up in 1989 by taking four sub-districts from Bangkok Noi. The west side of Borommaratchachonnani Road and Somdet Phra Pin Klao Road were moved back to Bangkok Noi in 1991, creating the new Arun Amarin Sub-district.

Bang Phlat has a number of transliteration spellings that are visible across the district including: Bang Phlat, Bang Phlad, Bang Plat, Bang Plad. It is likely that this spelling will become unified as the new MRT station stop has been titled "Bang Phlat".

The term "Bang Phlat" literally means "lost place". It is believed that in the past, the area was covered with canals and dense vegetation, making it easy for outsiders to get lost.

== Administration ==
The district is divided into four sub-districts (khwaeng).

No.	Name	Thai	Area (km^{2})	Map
1.	Bang Phlat	บางพลัด	3.296	Map
2.	Bang O	บางอ้อ	2.846	Map
3.	Bang Bamru	บางบำหรุ	2.332	Map
4.	Bang Yi Khan	บางยี่ขัน	2.886	Map
Total			11.360	Map

== Places ==
The main road running through Bang Phlat is Charan Sanit Wong, a road that parallels the Chao Phraya to the west from Thon Buri up to the Rama VII bridge.

Bang Phlat has a mixture of light commercial, industrial and residential zones. There are a few medium commercial and residential areas which are growing as the area becomes more prosperous. There are two Express River Boat stations servicing Bang Phlat, Krung Thon Bridge to the south and Rama VII Bridge to the north.

- Rama VIII Bridge and Rama VIII Park
- Krungthon Bridge
- Wat Kharuehabodi (วัดคฤหบดี)
- Wat Bowon Mongkhon (วัดบวรมงคล)
- Masjid Bang O
- Yanhee International Hospital
- Pata Pinklao and Pata Zoo
