= Bang Bamru =

Coordinates: 13.78085°N 100.48236°E

Bang Bamru แขวงบางบำหรุ
- Khwaeng
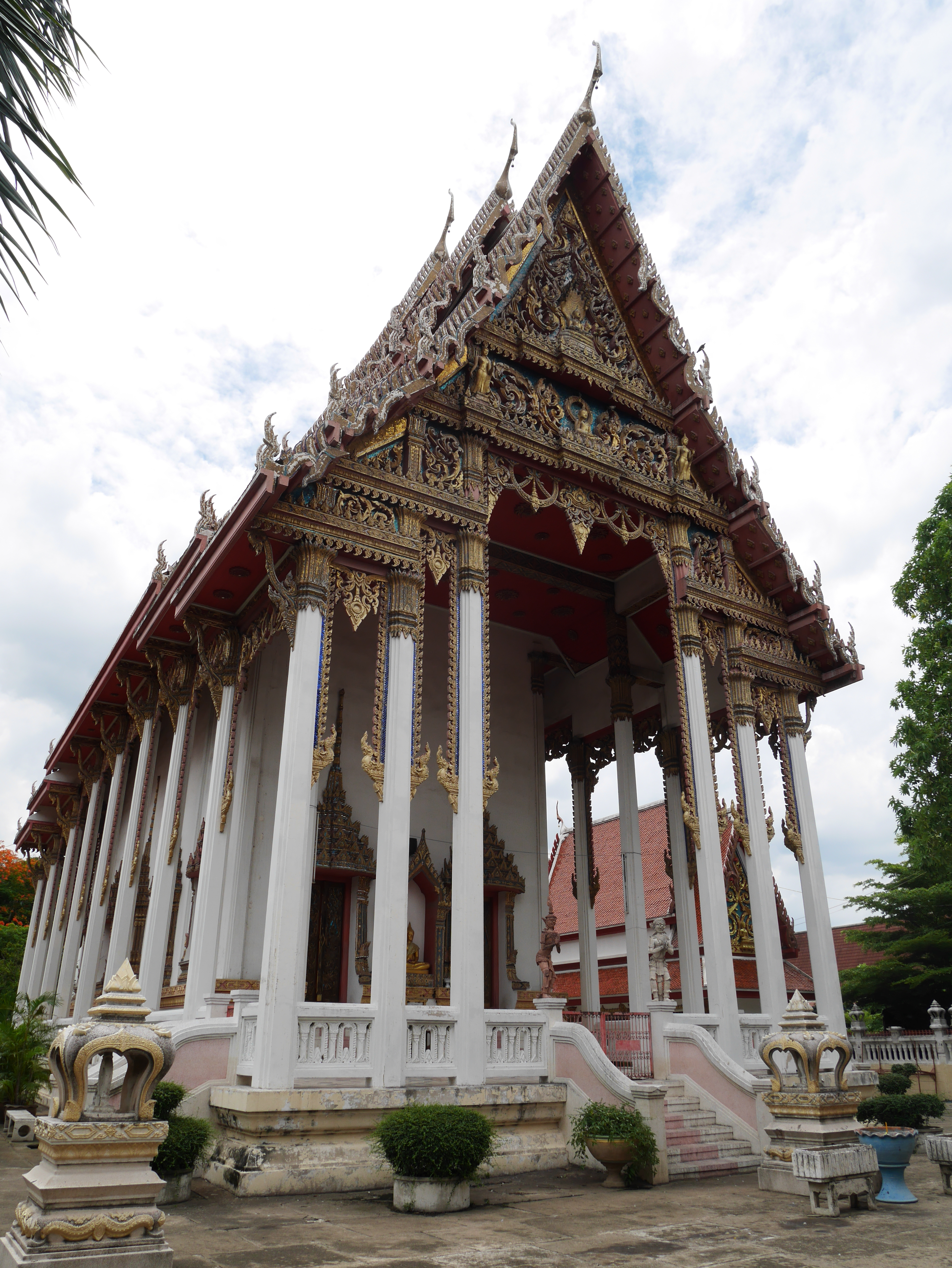
- Wat Ruak Bang Bamru, a local Buddhist temple

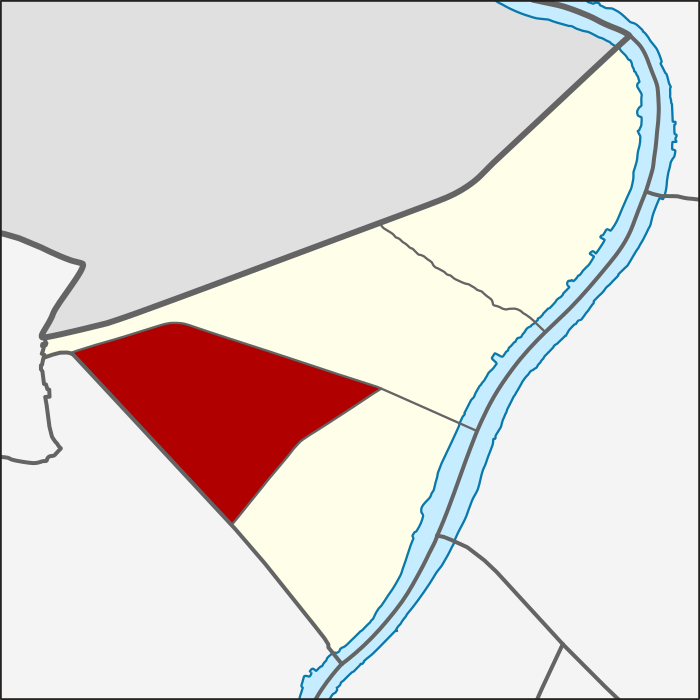
- Location in Bang Phlat District
- Country: Thailand
- Province: Bangkok
- Khet: Bang Phlat

Area
  - Total: 2.332 km^{2} (0.900 sq mi)

Population (2018)
  - Total: 18,514
  - Density: 7,939.11/km^{2} (20,562.2/sq mi)
- Time zone: UTC+7 (ICT)
- Postal code: 10700
- TIS 1099: 102503

Bang Bamru (Thai: บางบำหรุ, pronounced [bāːŋ bām.rùʔ]) is a khwaeng (subdistrict) of Bang Phlat District in Thonburi side of Bangkok.

== History ==
The name "Bang Bamru" after the local canal, Khlong Bang Bamru that flows through central of the area. Khlong Bang Bumru is separated from the right side of Khlong Bangkok Noi in the neighbouring area Arun Amarin of Bangkok Noi District pass beside of CentralPlaza Pinklao northward up till the southern railway on the periphery of Bang Phlat in its district with Tambon Wat Chalo, Amphoe Bang Kruai of Nonthaburi Province. This canal is about 4–5 m (13.12–16.40 ft) wide and 840 m (2,755 ft) long.

Bang Bamru in the past was an area known for being a good place to plant pineapples.

Bang Bamru separated from Bangkok Noi District in 1989, along with the other areas of Bang Phlat District.

== Geography ==
Bang Bamru is regarded as the southwest part of the district.

The area is bounded by other subdistricts (from north clockwise): Bang Phlat in its district (Sirindhorn Road is a divider line), Bang Yi Khan in its district (Charan Sanitwong Road is a divider line), Arun Amarin in Bangkok Noi District (Borommaratchachonnani Road is a divider line), Bang Phlat in its district (Sirindhorn Road is a divider line), respectively.

The southern railway station Bang Bamru, lies just outside the Bang Bamru boundary in the neighbouring Bang Phlat Subdistrict.

"Pinklao" is also another name for this area (along with Bang Yi Khan and Arun Amarin).

== Transportation ==
Bang Bamru is served by MRT Blue Line's Bang Yi Khan Station (BL05), where the station is located above Charan Sanitwong Road near Borommaratchachonnani Intersection.
