= Bang O =

Bang O บางอ้อ
- Khwaeng
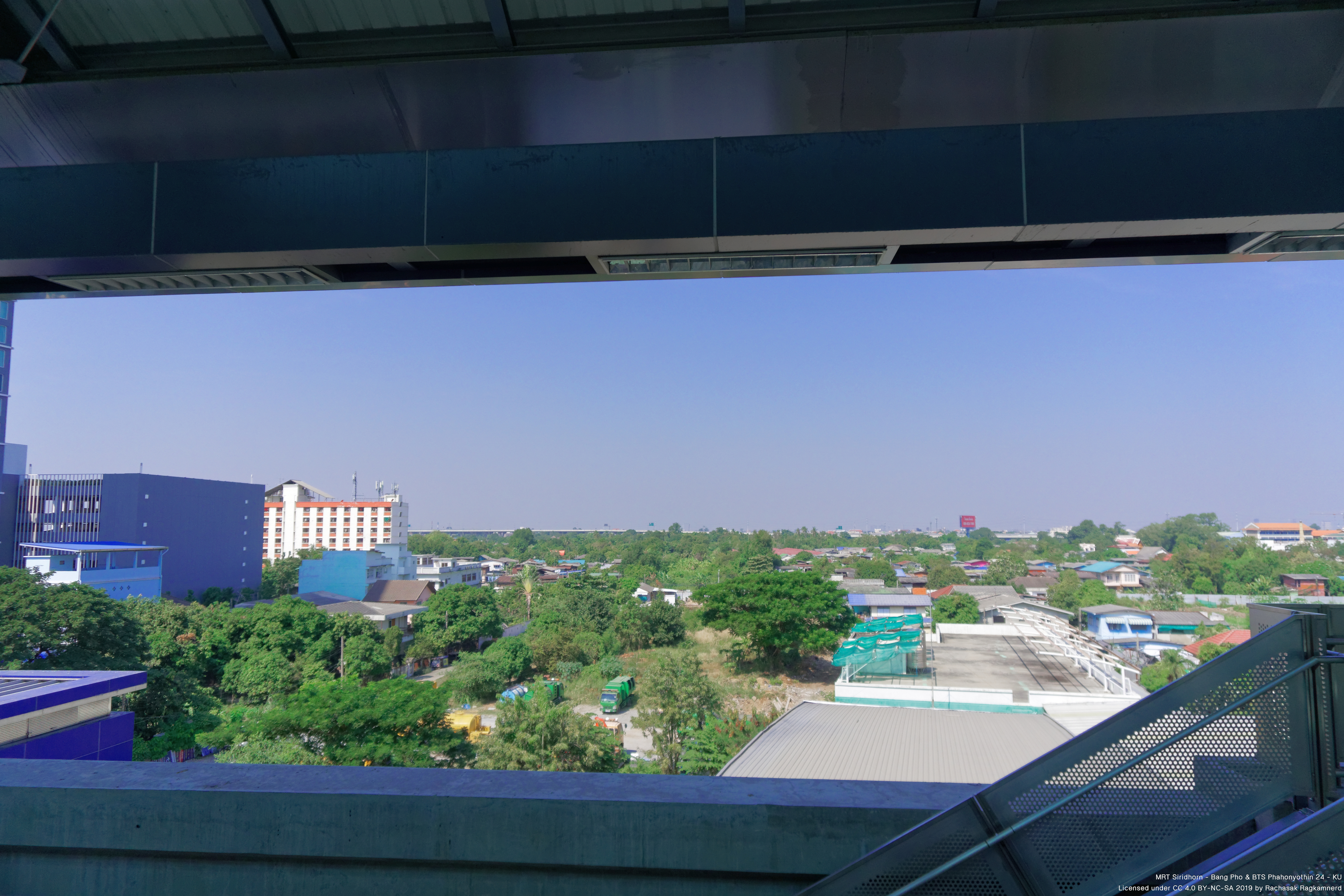
- View of Bang O from Bang Phlat MRT station

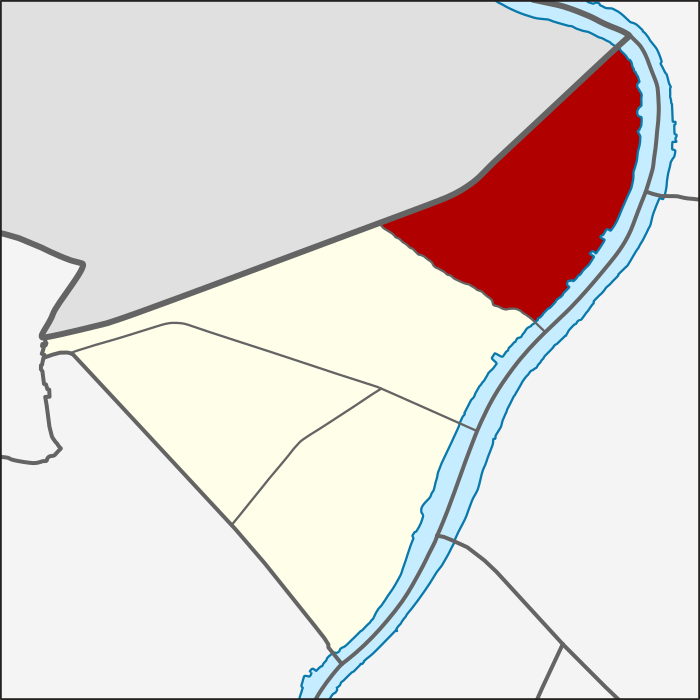
- Location in Bang Phlat District
- Country: Thailand
- Province: Bangkok
- Khet: Bang Phlat

Area
  - Total: 2.846 km^{2} (1.099 sq mi)

Population (2020)
  - Total: 24,225
  - Density: 8,512/km^{2} (22,050/sq mi)
- Time zone: UTC+7 (ICT)
- Postal code: 10700
- TIS 1099: 102502

Bang O (Thai: บางอ้อ, pronounced [bāːŋ ʔɔ̂ː]) is a khwaeng (subdistrict) of Bang Phlat District, in Bangkok, Thailand. In 2020, it had a total population of 24,225 people. Bang O is the uppermost part of not just Bang Phlat but Thonburi side (the west bank of the Chao Phraya River) as a whole. Bang O MRT station, a station on the Blue Line, is named after the area.

== History ==
Bang O has been home to a Muslim community since ancient times. Their ancestors were Sunni Muslims who immigrated from Persia (present-day Iran) to Siam during the Ayutthaya period, at least 300 years ago.

In the 19th century, around the reign of King Rama V, Bang O became known for its lumber trade, similar to Bang Pho on the opposite side of the Chao Phraya River. With its sloping riverbank terrain, Bang O was well suited for mooring ships and handling cargo. Many lumber business operators were Muslims, who typically lived on houseboats along the river. These Muslims were often referred to as Khaek Phae (แขกแพ), meaning "Muslims living on rafts." Timber trade concessions at the time were mostly granted to foreign companies, such as Bombay Burmah and East Asiatic (now EAC Invest A/S).

The first row of shophouses along Charansanitwong Road in Bang O comprised 20 units on the outbound side. They were owned and operated by the Manajit family, one of the area's long-established Muslim families, and opened in 1956 when road construction was completed. All units were fully rented upon opening.

The opening of Krung Thon Bridge (commonly known as Sang Hi Bridge) in 1958 improved road traffic between the Phra Nakhon side (Bangkok's historical core) and the Thonburi side. This development led to the decline and eventual closure of the ferry service that had long connected Bang O and Bang Krabue, a business dating back to the reign of King Rama V.

Bang O was also once the residence of Chonlathee Thanthong, a well-known composer of luk thung (Thai country music).

Bang O MRT station, a station on the Blue Line, is named after the area.

== Etymology ==
"Bang" is central Thai name for a populated place or settlement situated on the bank of the waterway. "O" is the local name for Arundo donax, a type of reed that assumedly used to flourish in the area. The name therefore means "A Place of Arundo donax".

The name "Bang O" also carries an interesting nuance in Thai everyday language. In spoken Thai, the interjection "โอ้" or "อ้อ" (pronounced like the "O" in Bang O) is often used when someone suddenly understands something after confusion—similar to saying "Aha!" or "Oh, I see!" in English. This has led to the common Thai idiom "ถึงบางอ้อแล้ว" (thueng Bang O laeo), which literally means "(I've) reached Bang O" but figuratively means "Now I get it!" This amusing overlap between place name and spoken expression has made "Bang O" a playful and memorable phrase in Thai culture.

== Geography ==
It lies in northeastern fringe of Thonburi side, neighbouring the subdistricts of Bang Kruai in Bang Kruai District of Nonthaburi Province, Bang Sue in Bang Sue District and Thanon Nakhon Chai Si in Dusit District of Bangkok, Bang Phlat in its district of Bangkok, and Bang Kruai in Bang Kruai District of Nonthaburi Province (clockwise from north).

The subdistrict is crossed by small khlong (canal)-like waterways including Khlong Tao It, Khlong Bang Rak, Khlong Bang Phra Kru, Khlong Bang Phlat, Khlong Mon, Khlong Bang Lamut.
