= Pata Zoo =

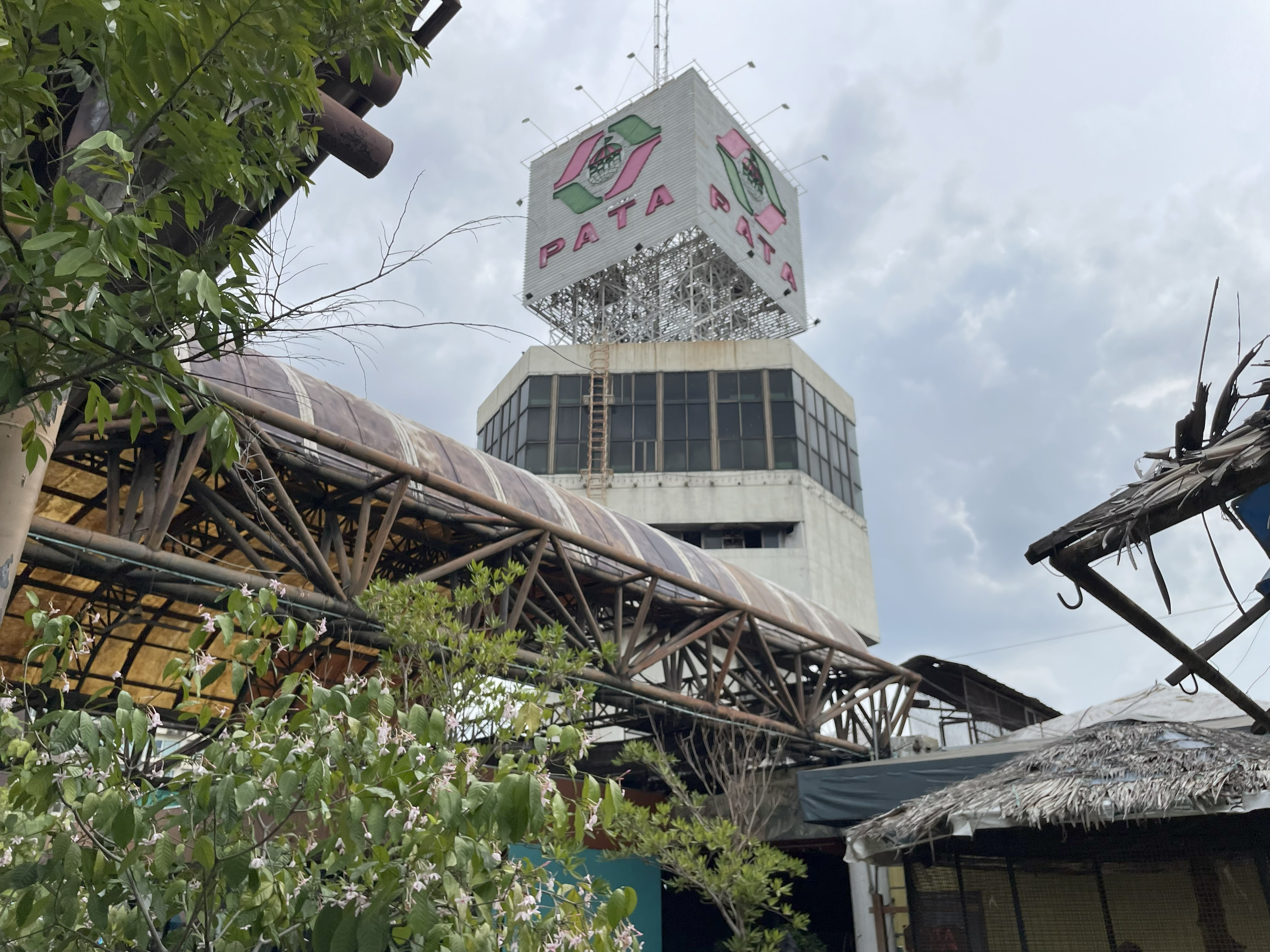
- Pata Zoo (Bangkok), as seen in 2023.
- Interactive map of Pata Zoo
- 13°46′17″N 100°29′02″E
- Date opened: 1983
- Location: Bang Phlat, Bangkok, Thailand

Pata Zoo (Thai: สวนสัตว์พาต้า) is a private zoo on the 6th and 7th floors of Pata Pinklao Department Store, Bang Yi Khan Subdistrict, Bang Phlat District, Bangkok between Borommaratchachonnani and Arun Amarin Intersections close to Phra Pinklao Bridge. Pata Zoo has operated since 1983, along with the department store. Pata Zoo has been the subject of ongoing attention from Thai animal welfare organizations, who have raised concerns about the conditions of certain enclosures, particularly those housing primates such as the gorilla Bua Noi.

== Layout ==
The zoo is divided into two parts, upper and lower floor:

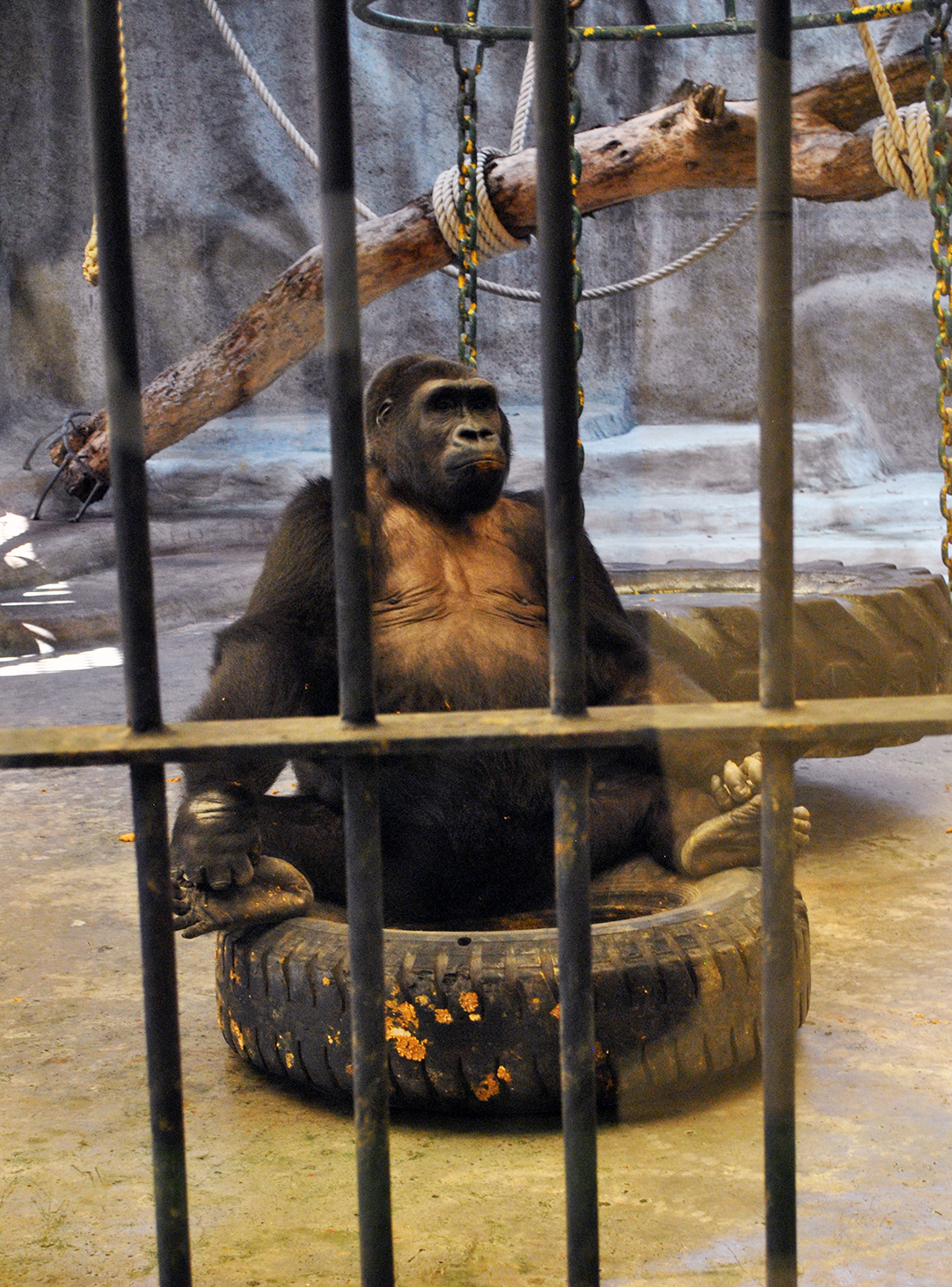
Bua Noi, the zoo's only gorilla, photographed in 2015.

- Sixth floor – Nocturnal animals, fish, reptiles. Of interest are the many albino Burmese pythons which the zoo is able to breed successfully. Large stuffed giant freshwater stingray is also displayed; it is the largest species of freshwater stingray in the world and an endangered species. On weekends there are magic shows and information and education sessions about exotic pets.
- Seventh floor – Birds, orangutans, macaques, gibbons, binturongs, guinea pigs, rabbits, pygmy goats, sheep, Asiatic black bears, lemurs, and an artificial waterfall and botanical garden. One notable animal featured here is a female western lowland gorilla over 30 years old named Bua Noi (บัวน้อย, 'little lotus'), the only gorilla left in Thailand. Most critics of the Pata Zoo have focused on the living conditions of Bua Noi. She was born in the wild, captured as a baby, and has lived at the zoo since September 1987. The zoo veterinarian and zoo director insist that she is in good mental and physical health.

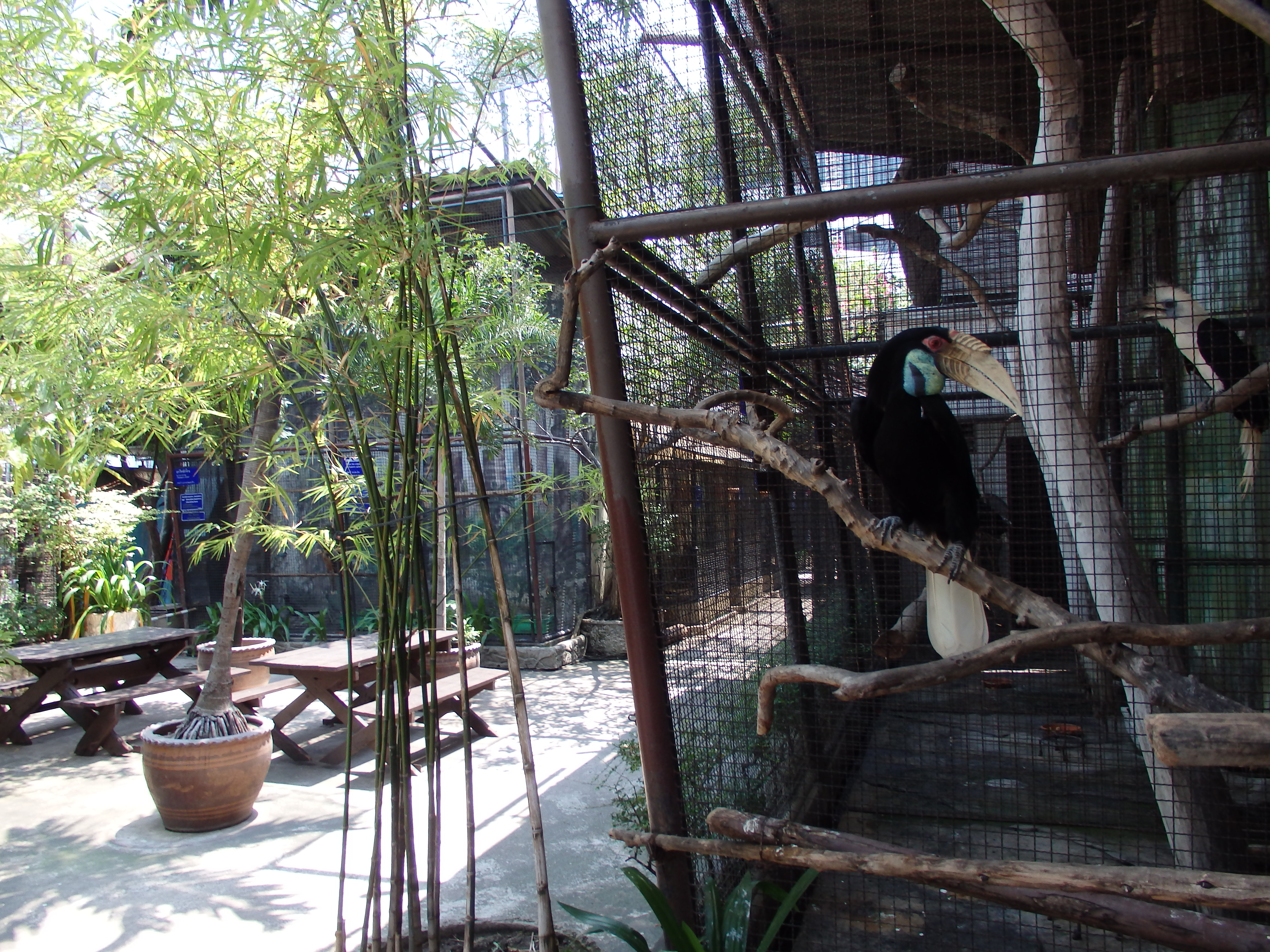
A hornbill at Pata Zoo, photographed in April 2016.

== Animal Welfare Concerns ==
Animal rights activists and campaigners submitted a petition of 35,000 signatures in September 2014 to Thailand's Department of National Parks, Wildlife and Plant Conservation (DNP) calling for the zoo's closure and the immediate removal of Bua Noi from the zoo. The DNP responded by declaring it could not withdraw the licence of Pata Zoo as the zoo had not done anything against the law. The DNP director-general argued that the Wildlife Conservation and Protection Act did not forbid animals from being caged in high-rise buildings and, therefore, Pata Zoo did not violate the law by maintaining a zoo on top of a building. The zoo immediately declared its innocence of any wrongdoing.

In March 2015, it was reported that Thai authorities charged that Pata Zoo had broken several laws and ordered the removal of all large animals, including Bua Noi, from the zoo. The zoo declined to transfer the gorilla to another facility. As of February 2020, Bua Noi was still in captivity at the zoo.

Following a fire at the zoo later that year, actress Gillian Anderson and animal rights group PETA sent a letter to the zoo's owner expressing concern about the animals' welfare and urging him to consider closing the facility. At the end of 2020, singer and actress Cher wrote a letter to Thailand’s environment minister, asking the minister to support her efforts to relocate the gorilla.

== Zoo's Public Response and Welfare Measures ==
In March 2023, activists sprayed messages on the department store building calling for Bua Noi to be freed. In response, the zoo announced a bounty of 100,000 baht for information leading to the arrest of the offenders, citing intrusion. The zoo stated it was ready to issue a transparent statement clarifying what it described as the full truth after facing prolonged criticism.

Since January 2025, the zoo has introduced a new policy allowing visitors to see Bua Noi in limited groups of no more than 30 people at a time, in order to reduce stress for the aging gorilla. Before each viewing, visitors are shown a video presentation explaining what the zoo presents as the background of Bua Noi: she was born in a German zoo and has been living here since 1987 under the care of the same keeper to this day. The zoo emphasizes that she has always been cared for with dedication and affection.

== Operating Days and Hours ==
Since April 20, 2026, the zoo has adjusted its operating days and hours. It has changed from being open every day except Mondays, from 10:00 a.m. to 4:00 p.m., to being open only on Fridays, Saturdays, Sundays, and public holidays, from 10:00 a.m. to 6:00 p.m.

== Selected animal species ==
Mammals

- Tammar wallaby
- Dusky pademelon
- Common tree shrew
- Brown lemur
- Ruffed lemur
- Black and white ruffed lemur
- Northern slow loris
- Pygmy slow loris
- Common marmoset
- Weeper capuchin
- Common squirrel monkey
- Tufted capuchin
- Allen's swamp monkey
- Red-tailed guenon
- De brazza's monkey
- Green monkey
- Chlorocebus
- Stump-tailed macaque
- Crab-eating macaque
- Rhesus macaque
- Pig-tailed macaque
- Mandrill
- Gabon talapoin
- Silvered leaf monkey
- Tenasserim langur
- Dusky leaf monkey
- Phayre's leaf monkey
- Lar gibbon
- Pileated gibbon
- White-cheeked gibbon
- Western lowland gorilla
- Chimpanzee
- Bornean orangutan
- Pale giant squirrel
- Black giant squirrel
- Black-tailed prairie dog
- Red giant flying squirrel
- Belly-banded squirrel
- Variable squirrel
- Prevost's squirrel
- Indochinese ground squirrel
- Capybara
- Asiatic brush-tailed porcupine
- Malayan porcupine
- Crested porcupine
- Four-toed hedgehog
- Large flying fox
- Asiatic golden cat
- Leopard cat
- Clouded leopard
- Indochinese leopard
- Tiger
- Binturong
- Three-striped palm civet
- Masked palm civet
- Common palm civet
- Banded linsang
- Large Indian civet
- Javan mongoose
- Meerkat
- Golden jackal
- Sun bear
- Tibetan black bear
- Hog badger
- Chinese ferret-badger
- Lesser mouse-deer
- Northern red muntjac

Birds

- Crested wood partridge
- Chinese francolin
- Greater flamingo
- Spotted dove
- Red turtle dove
- Grey-capped emerald dove
- Zebra dove
- Blue-crowned pigeon
- Thick-billed green pigeon
- Renauld's ground dove
- Greater coucal
- Koel
- Common gallinule
- Black crowned crane
- Humboldt penguin
- Red-wattled lapwing
- Sunda scops owl
- Northern brown hornbill
- Bushy-crested hornbill
- Southern brown hornbill
- Northern pied hornbill
- White-crowned hornbill
- Great indian hornbill
- Rhinoceros hornbill
- Wreathed hornbill
- Red-billed hornbill
- Common hoopoe
- Coppersmith barbet
- Lineated barbet
- Red-throated barbet
- Great barbet
- Collared falconet
- Cockatiel
- White cockatoo
- Sulphur-crested cockatoo
- Goffin's cockatoo
- Grey parrot
- Yellow-naped amazon
- Green-cheeked amazon
- Hyacinth macaw
- Blue-and-yellow macaw
- Scarlet macaw
- Military macaw
- Sun parakeet
- Burrowing parrot
- Red-shouldered macaw
- Yellow-backed lorikeet
- Black-capped lory
- Vernal hanging parrot
- Eclectus parrot
- Moustached parakeet
- Grey-headed parakeet
- Blossom-headed parakeet
- Red-winged parrot
- Mangrove pitta
- Fairy-bluebird
- Golden-fronted leafbird
- Blue-winged leafbird
- Red avadavat
- Pin-tailed parrotfinch
- Chestnut munia
- Java finch
- Amazonian umbrellabird
- Racket-tailed drongo
- Green magpie
- Jungle crow
- Red-billed blue magpie
- Red-whiskered bulbul
- Everett's white-eye
- White-crested laughingthrush
- White-vented myna
- Common myna
- Pied starling
- Chestnut-tailed starling
- White-shouldered starling
- Golden-crested myna
- Philippine glossy starling
- Common hill myna
- Oriental magpie robin

Reptiles

- Alligator snapping turtle
- Red-eared slider
- African spurred tortoise
- Indian star tortoise
- Elongated tortoise
- Burmese black tortoise
- Leopard tortoise
- Southeast Asian box tortoise
- Asian leaf turtle
- Yellow-headed temple turtle
- Giant Asian pond turtle
- Malaysian giant turtle
- Black marsh turtle
- Big-headed turtle
- Fly river turtle
- Eastern long-necked turtle
- Mata mata
- Acanthosaura armata
- Hydrosaurus amboinensis

In August of the same year, the zoo announced a temporary suspension of Bua Noi's public viewing sessions to allow her more time to rest.

== Gallery ==
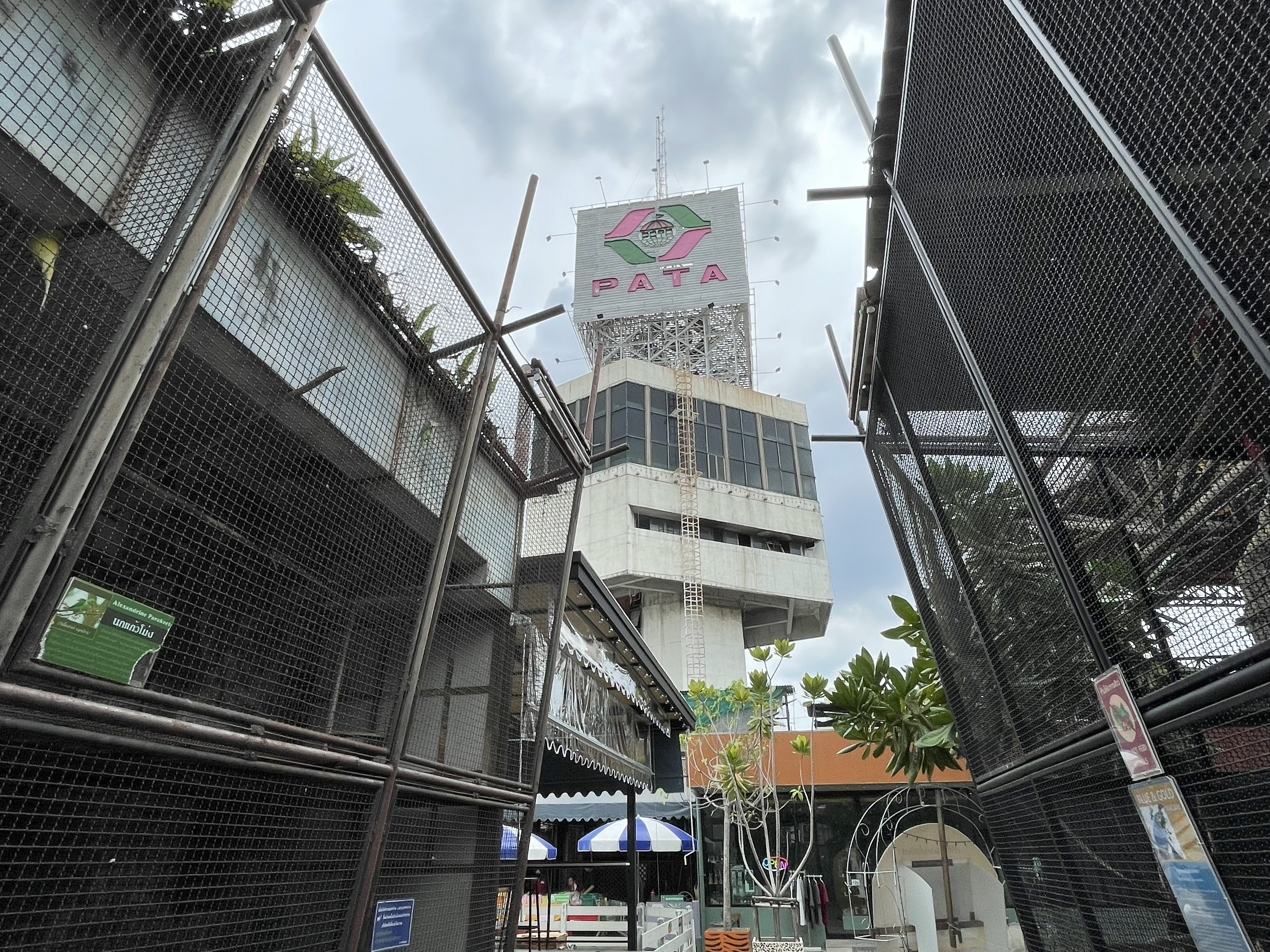
The iconic Pata Zoo signboard and the rooftop zoo's main building.

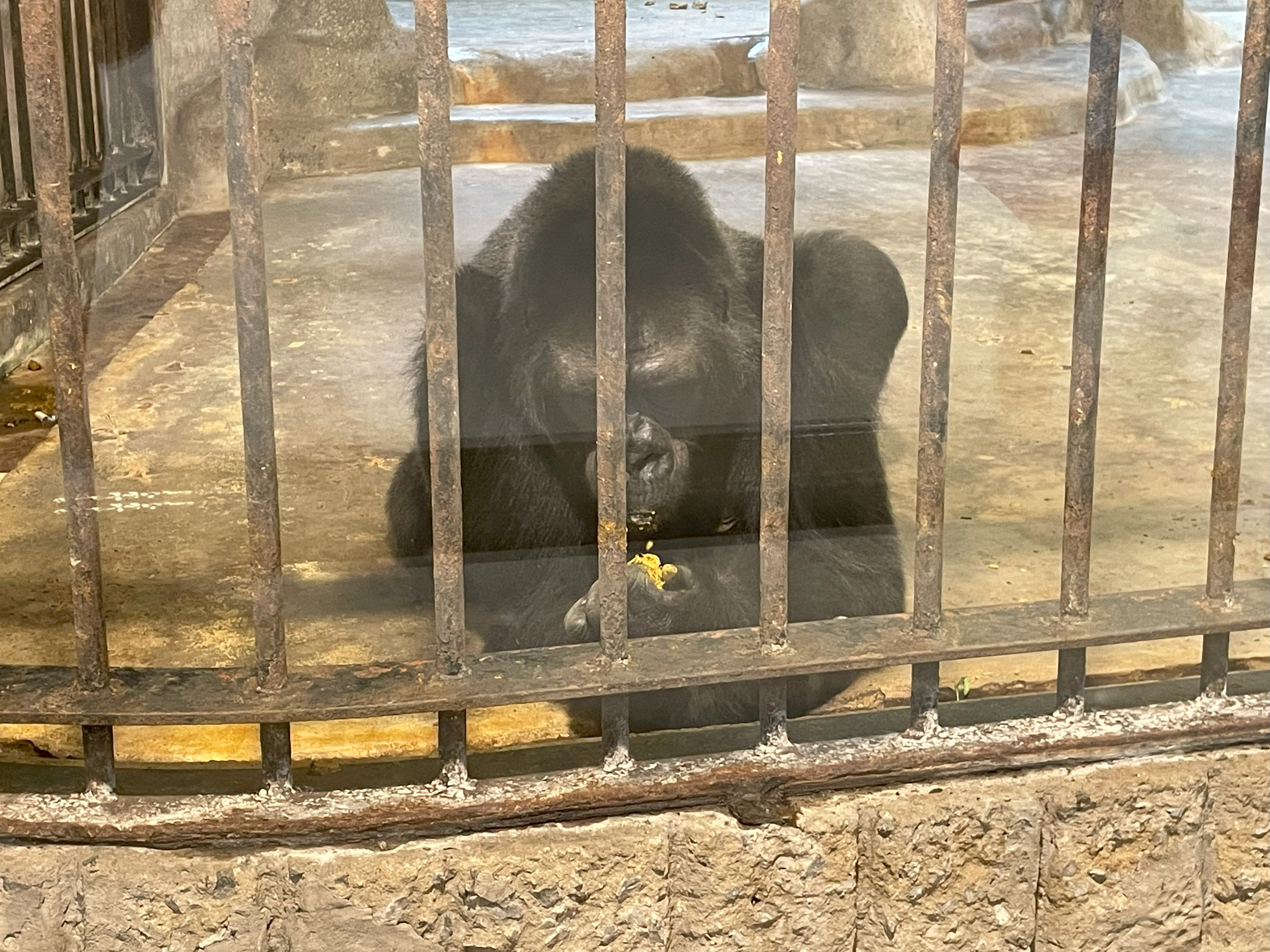
Bua Noi, a female western lowland gorilla, in her enclosure.

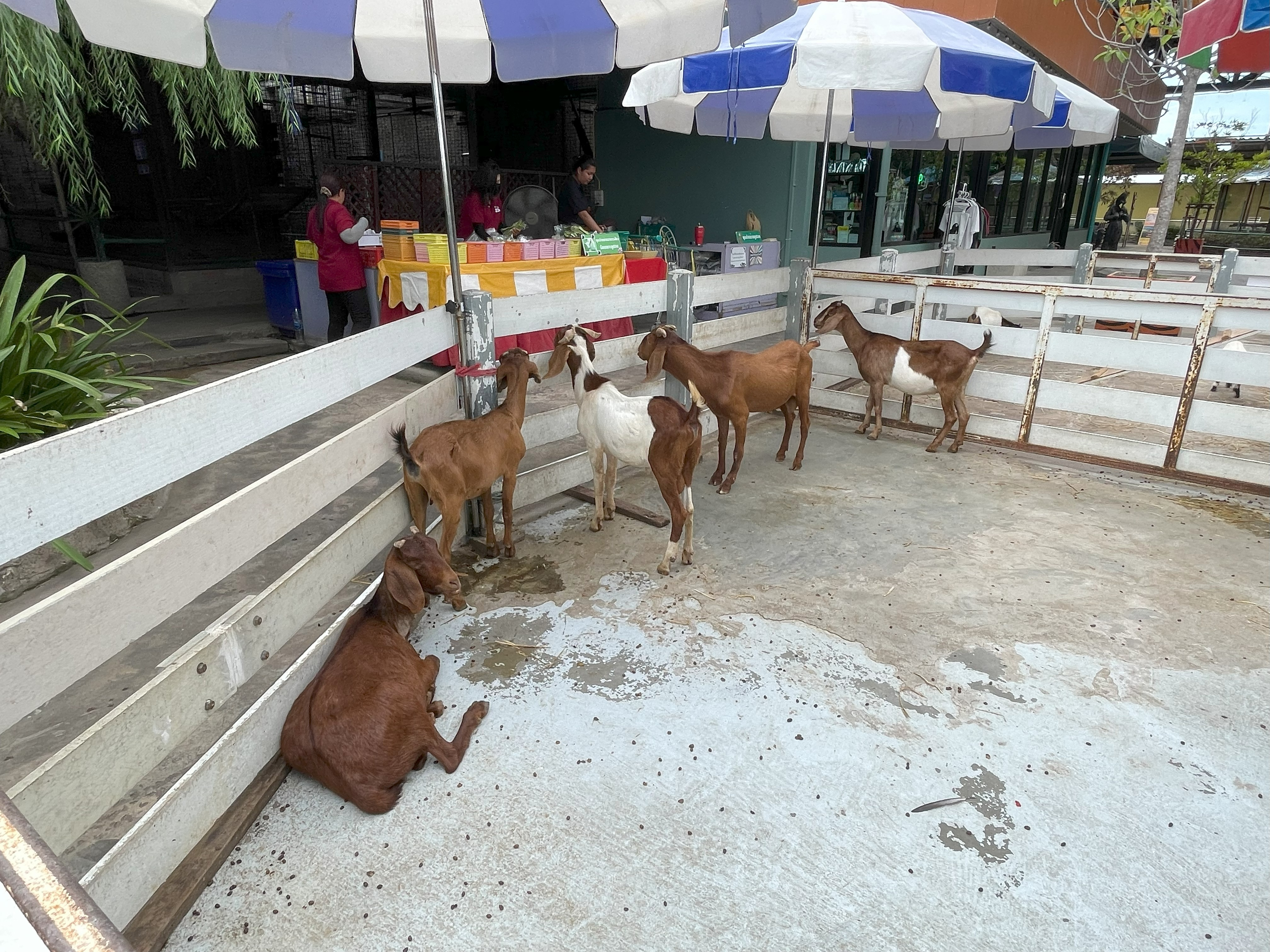
Goats in the petting zoo area.

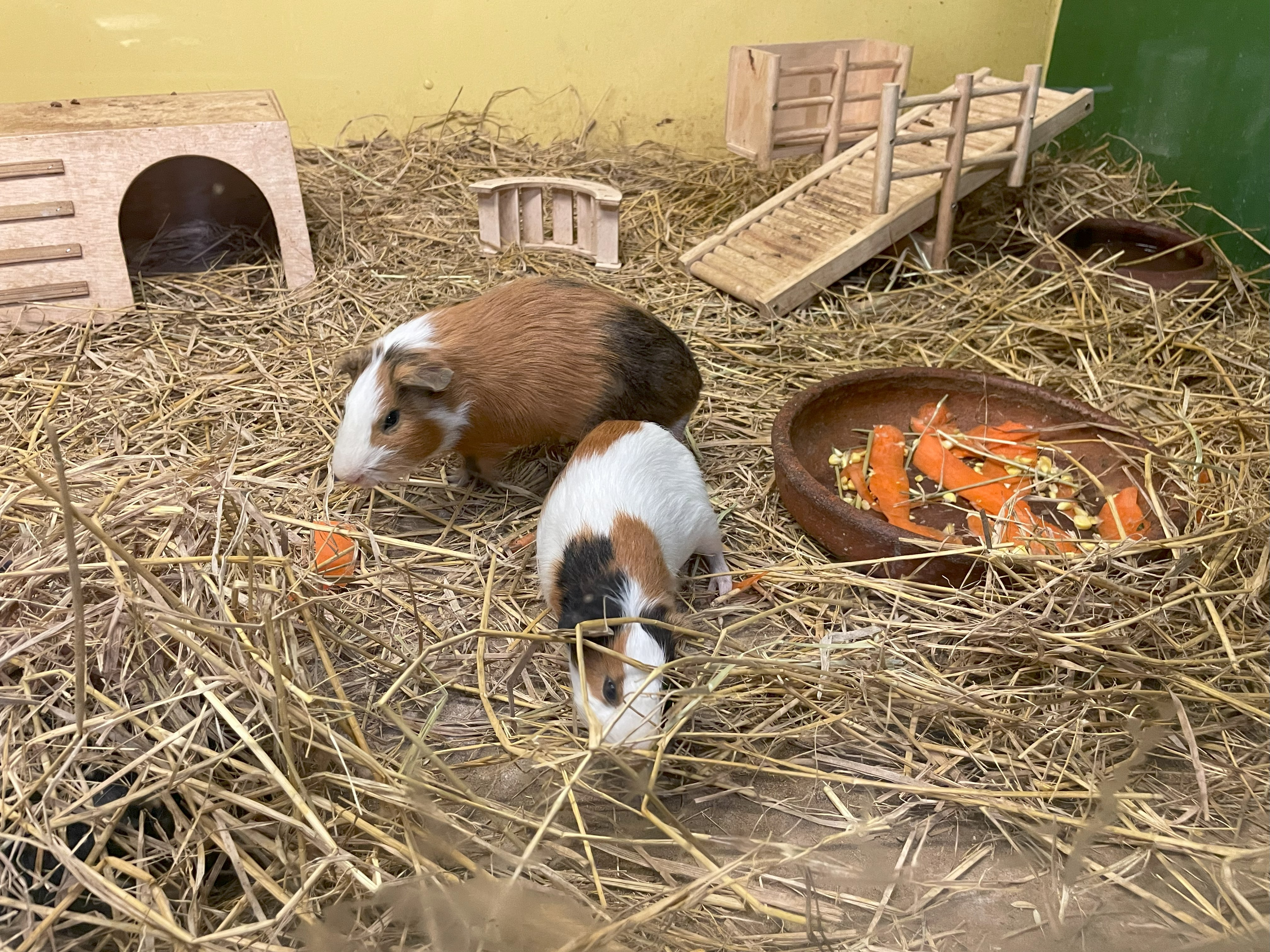
Guinea pigs in their enclosure.

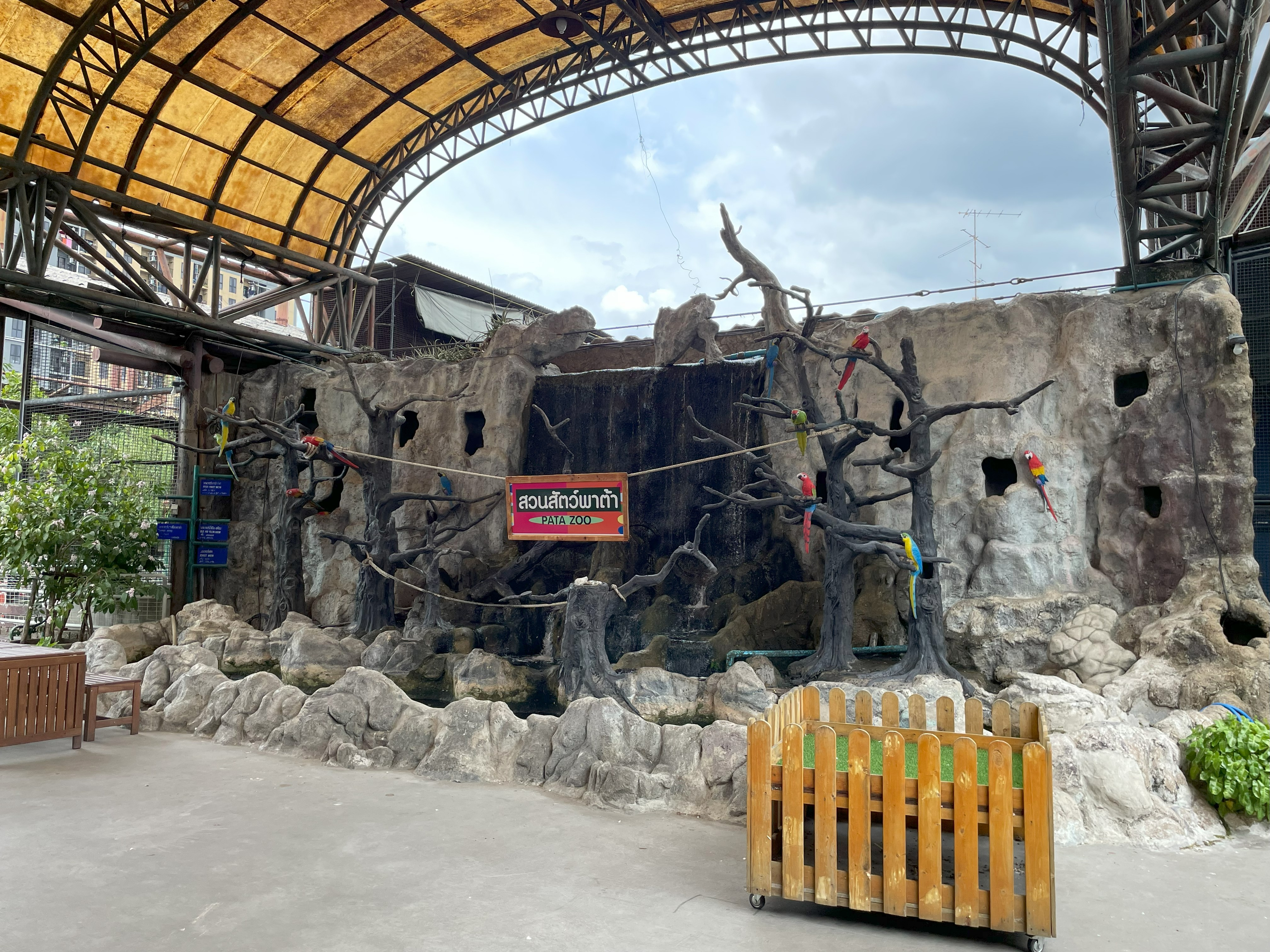
The birds exhibit at Pata Zoo, featuring macaws and an artificial waterfall.

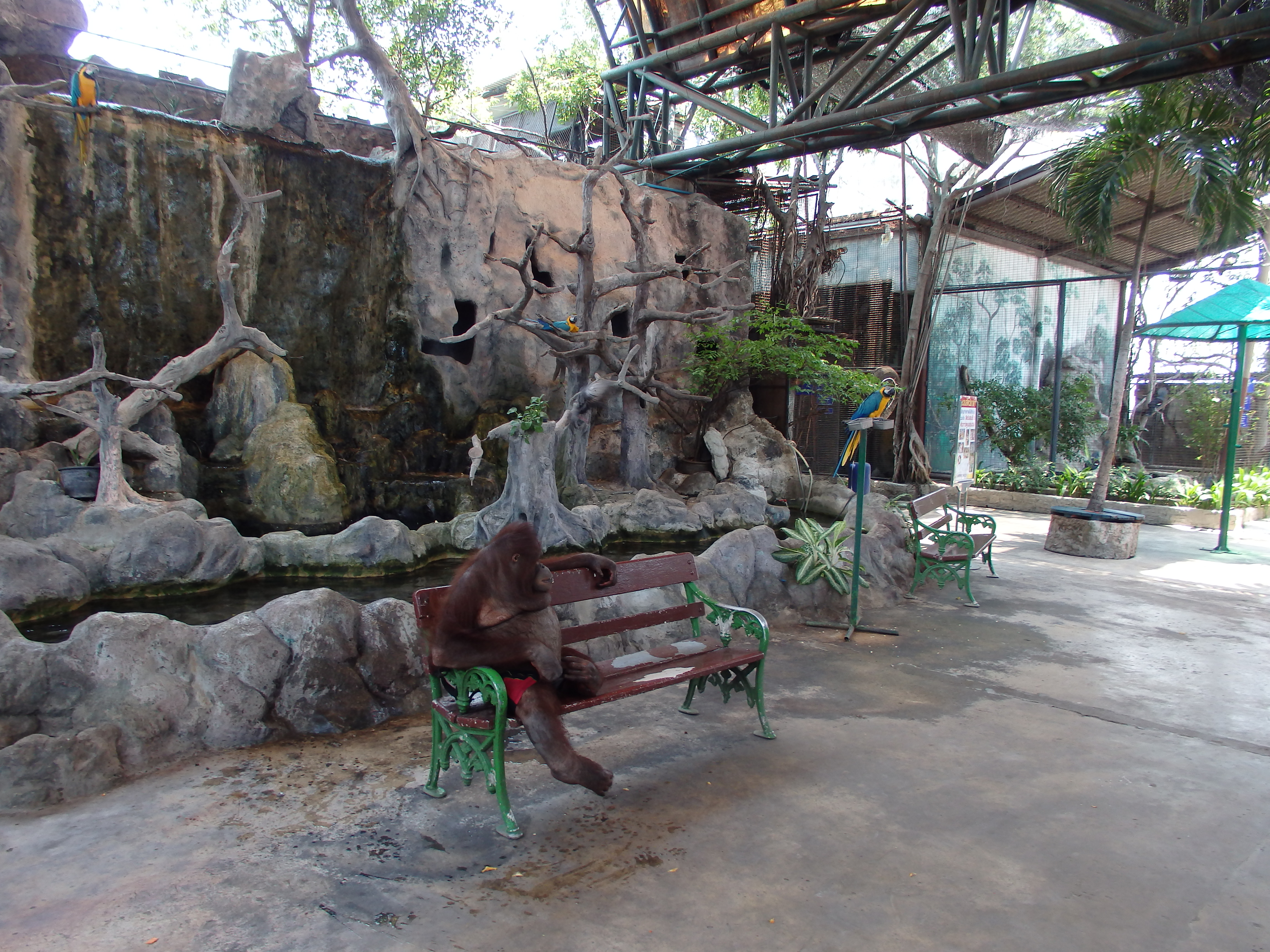
Bornean orangutan on bench in jungle-themed indoor exhibit with waterfall and parrots.

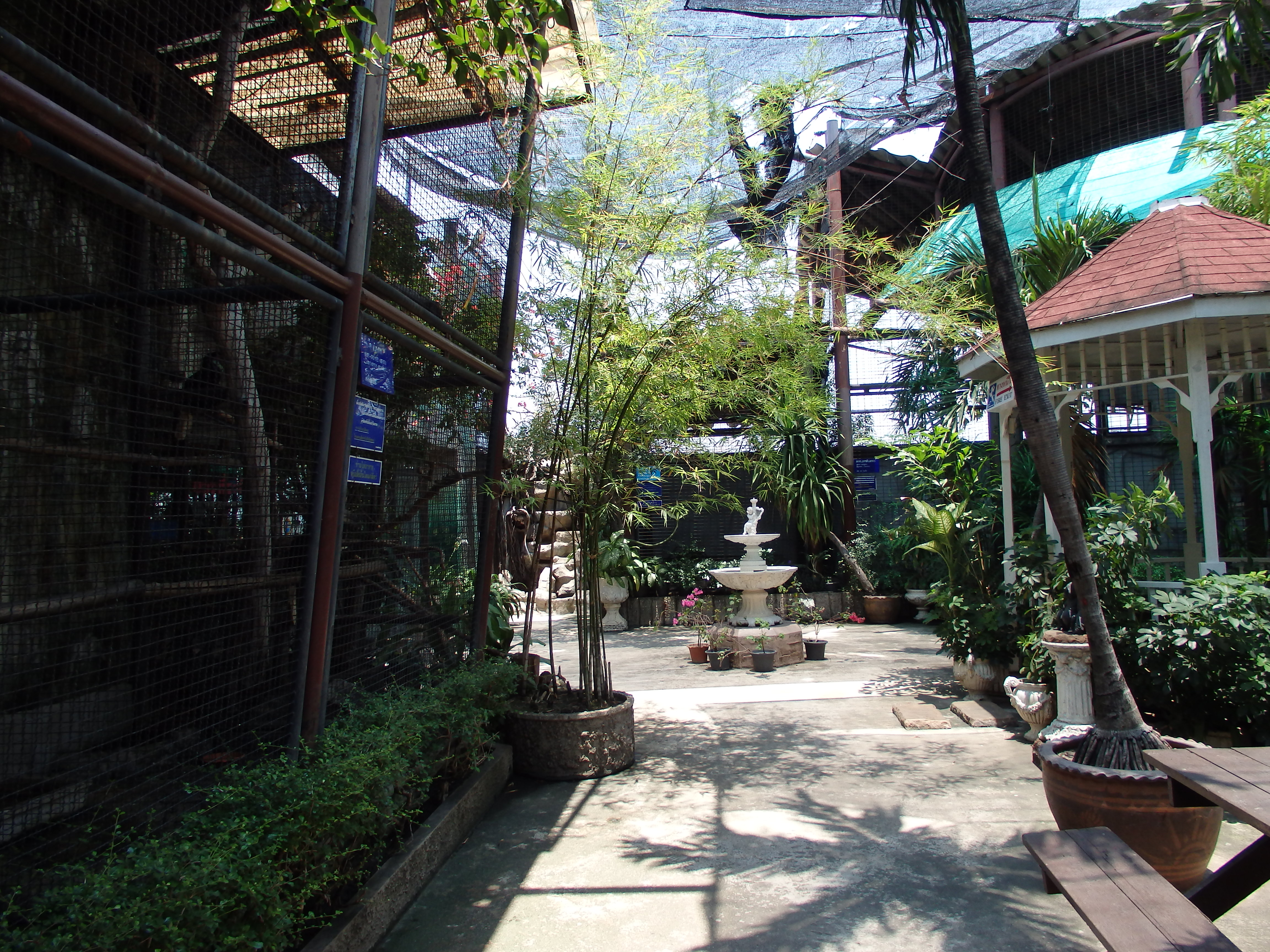
Courtyard with fountain, bird cage

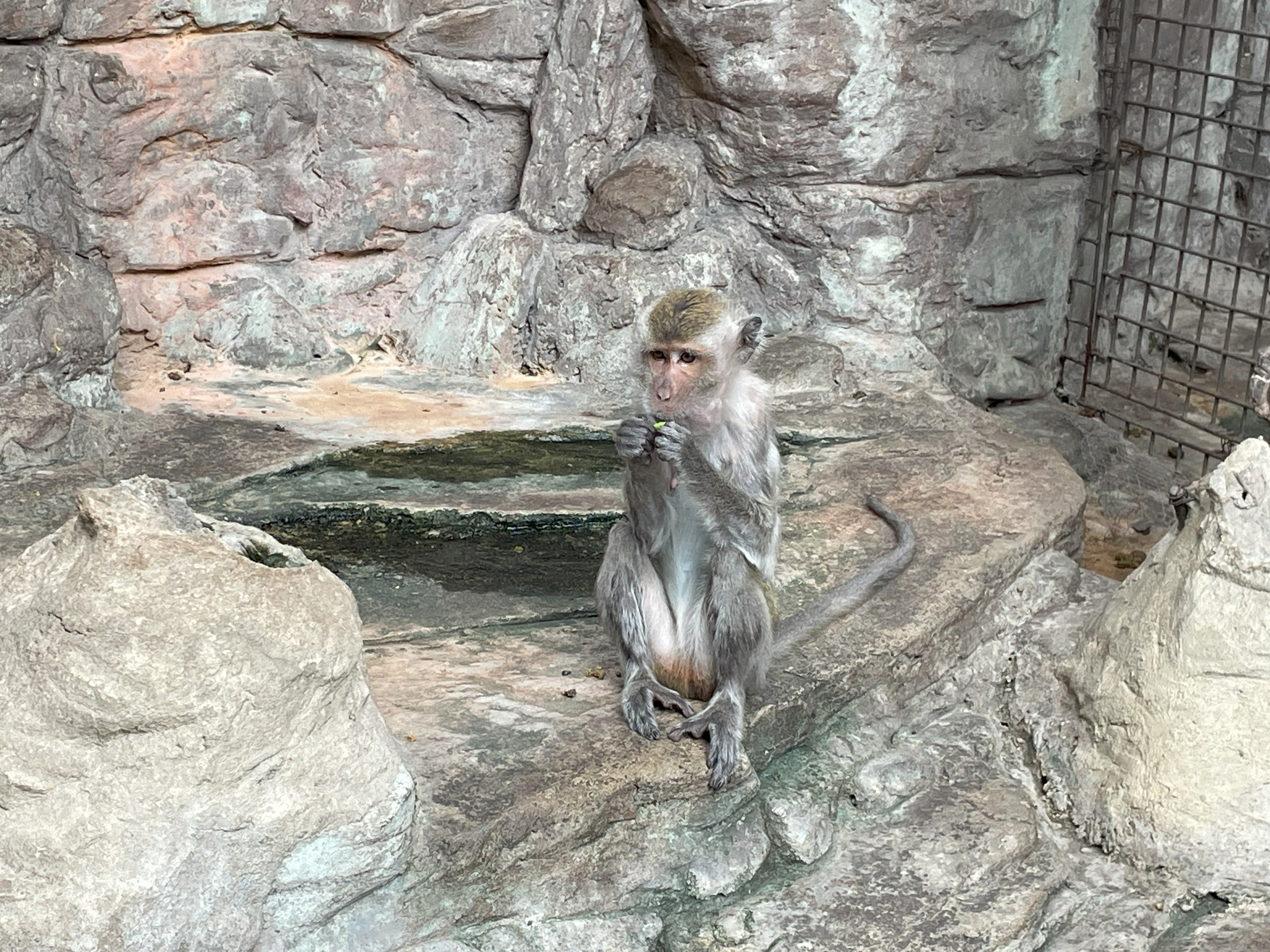
A long-tailed macaque (Macaca fascicularis) at Pata Zoo.

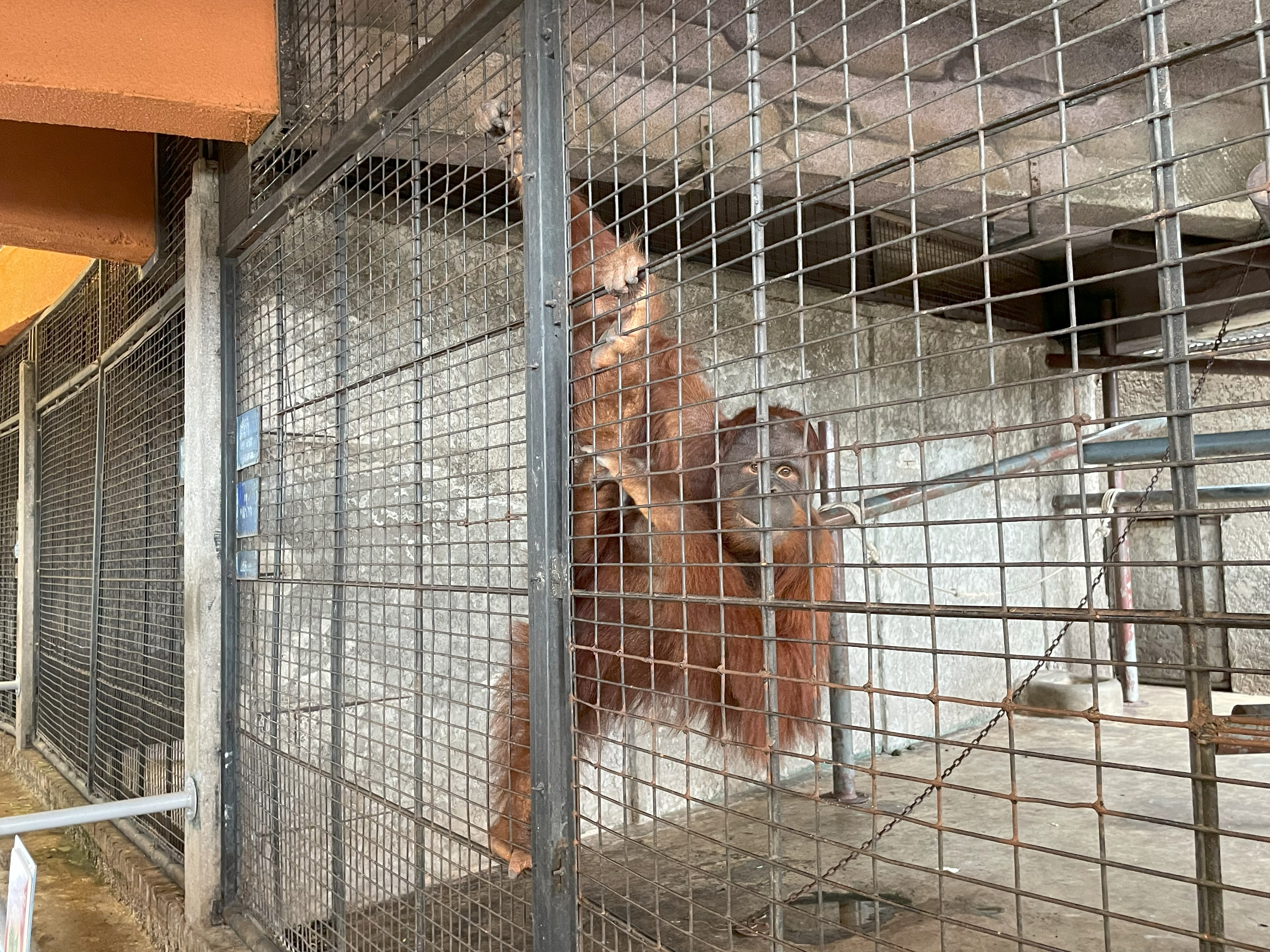
A Bornean orangutan in the indoor exhibit at Pata Zoo.

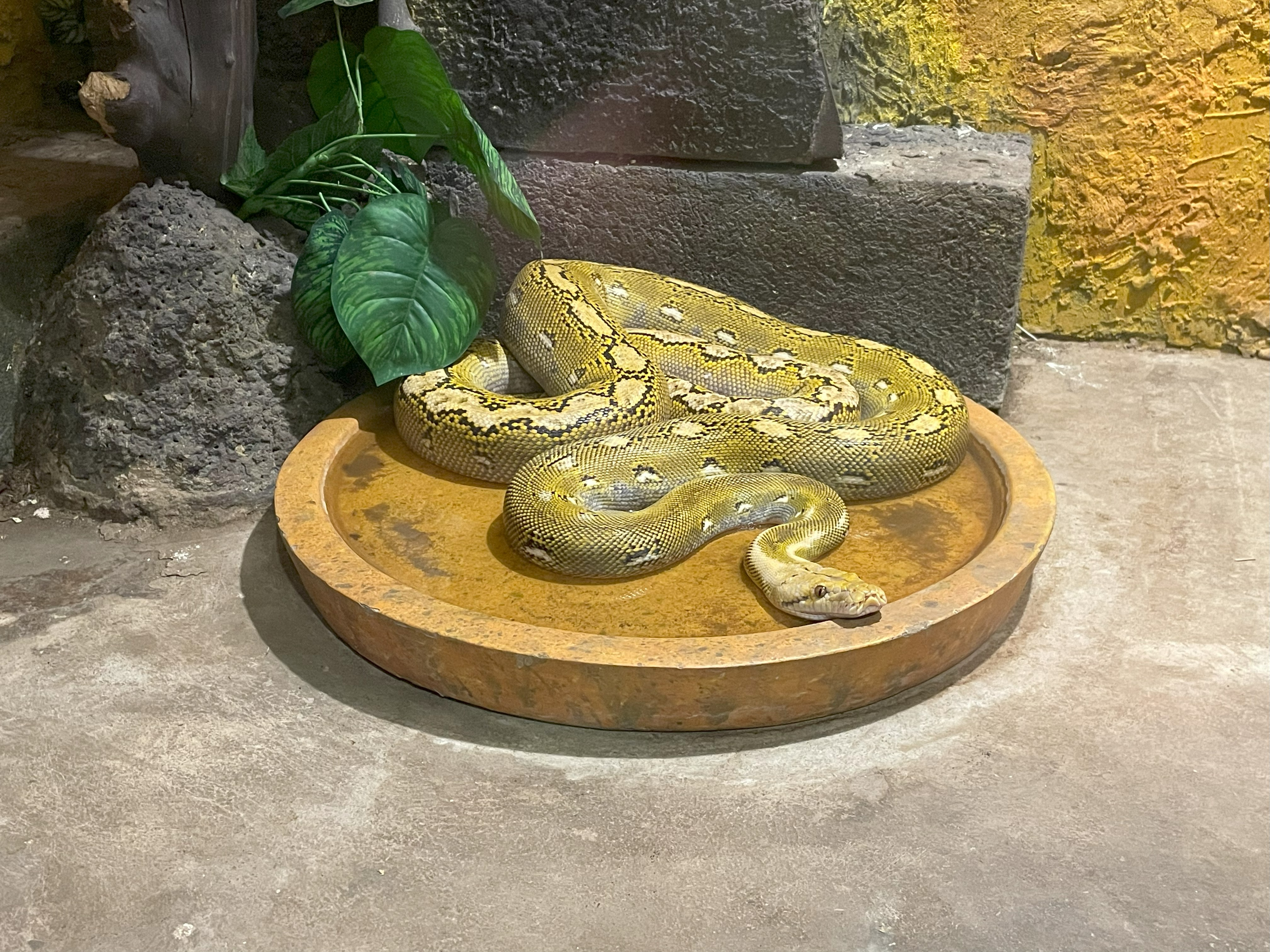
An albino Burmese python resting in an enclosure.

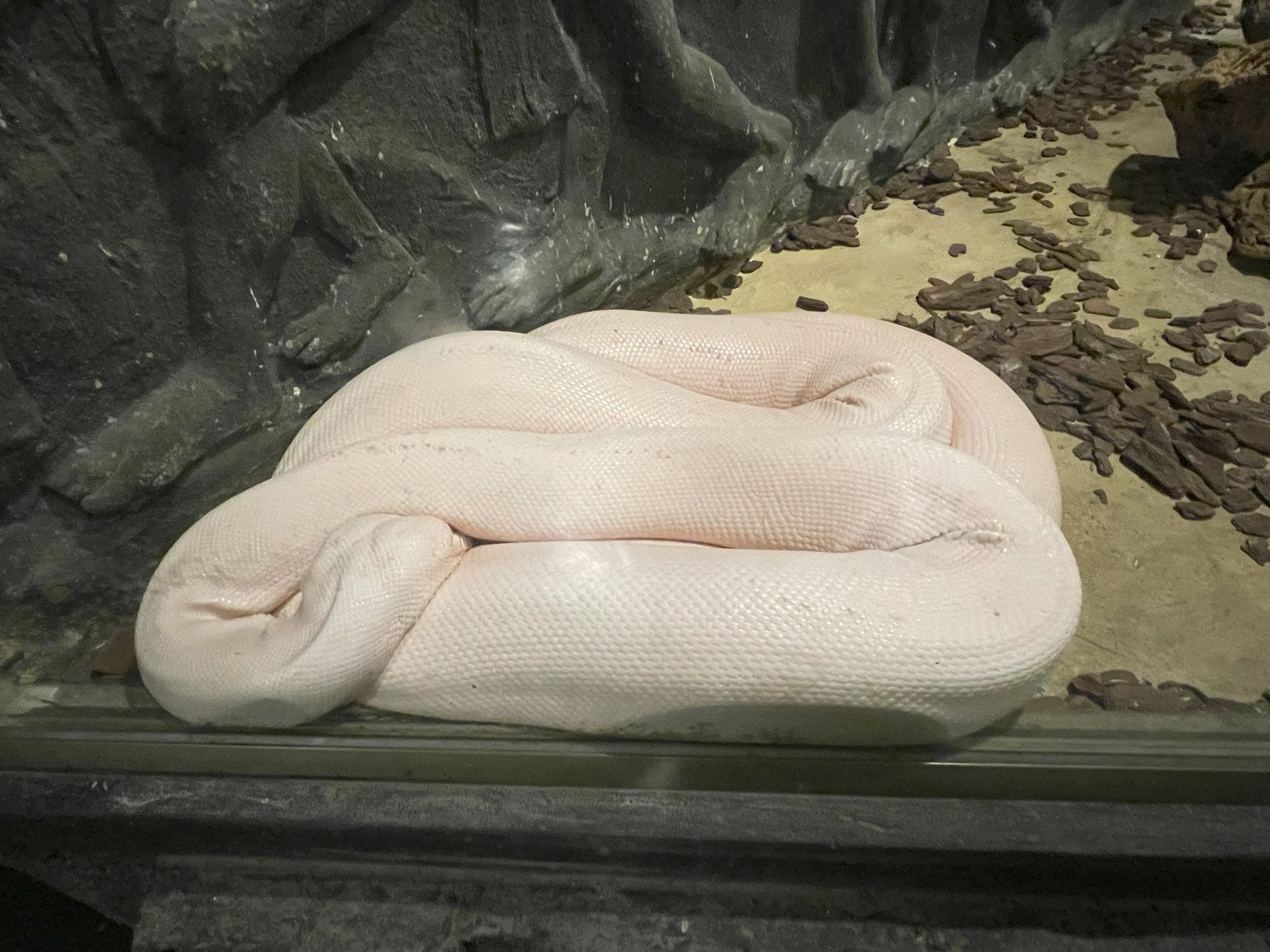
A white-colored albino Burmese python, a rare morph.

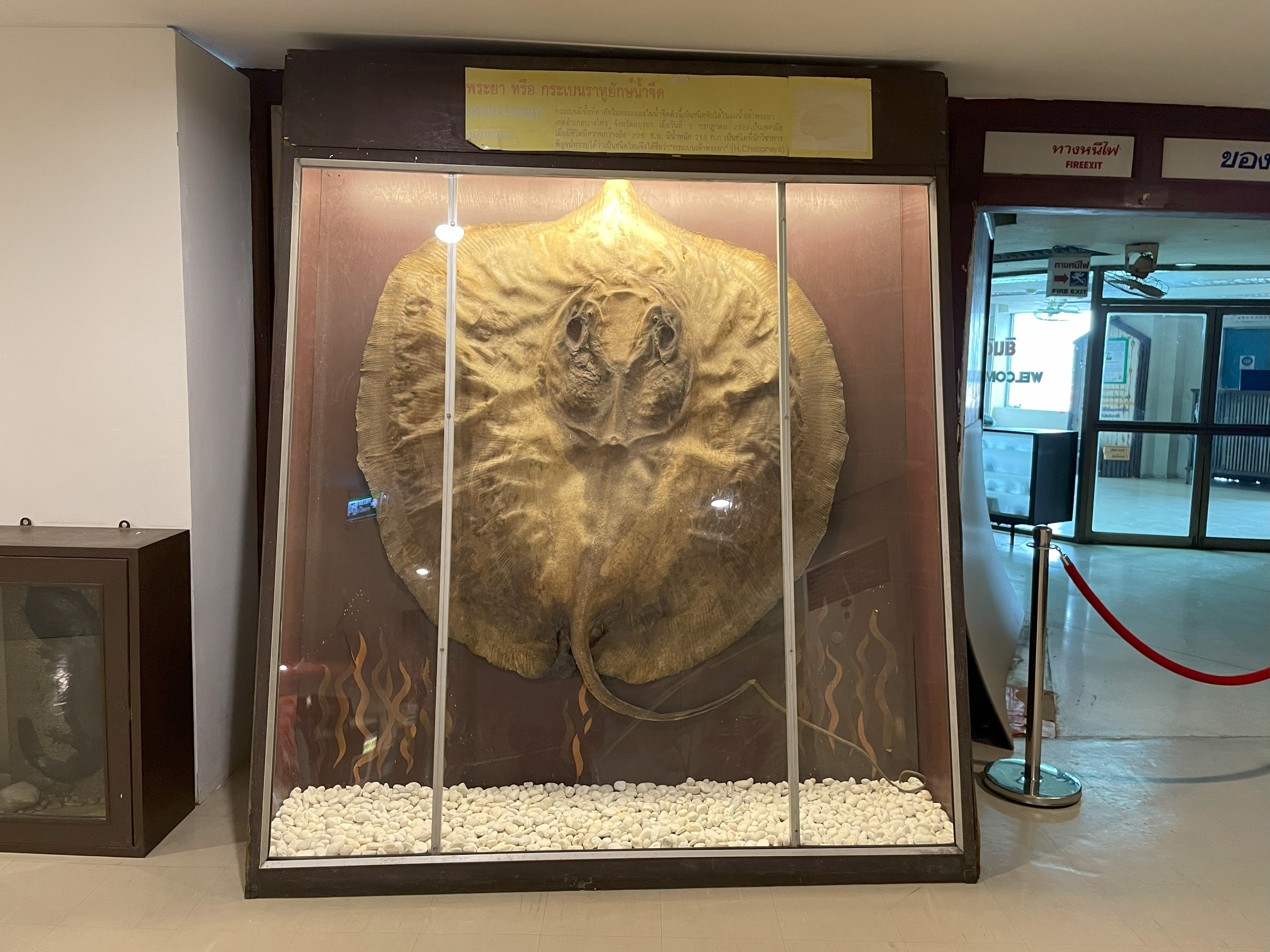
A taxidermied giant freshwater stingray on display.

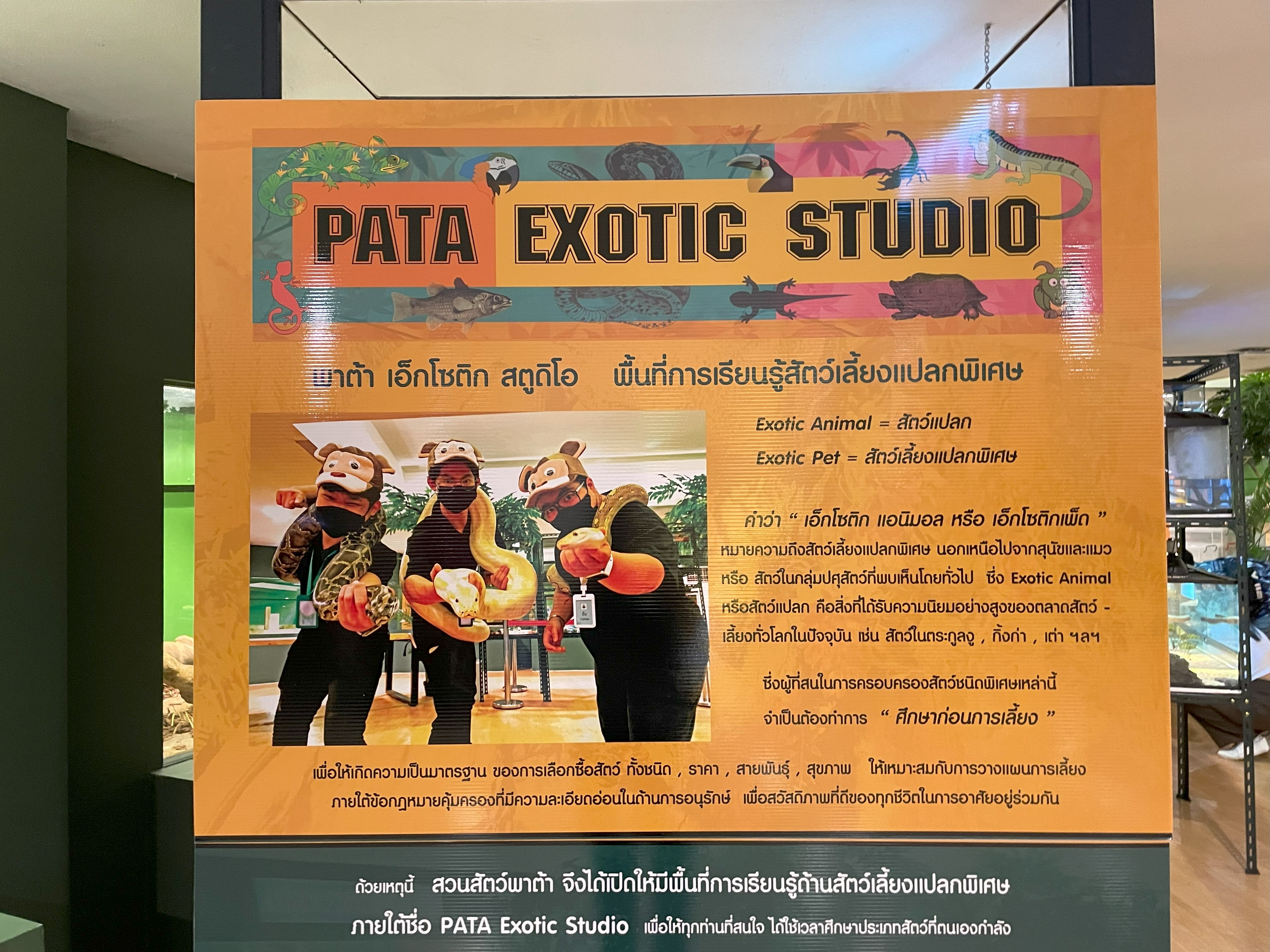
A sign for the "PATA Exotic Studio" educational section.

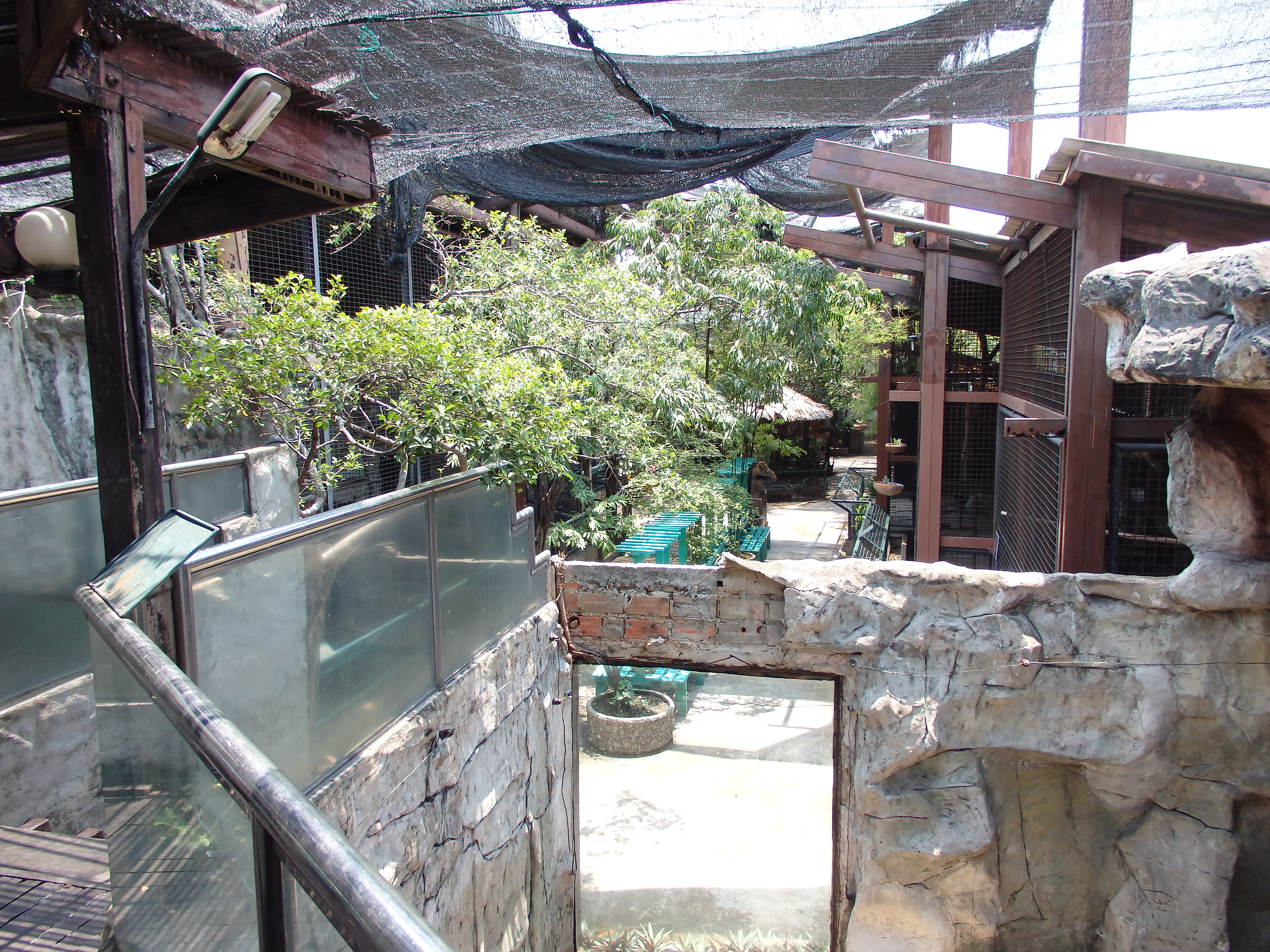
Naturalistic outdoor enclosure with rocks, trees, and viewing paths.

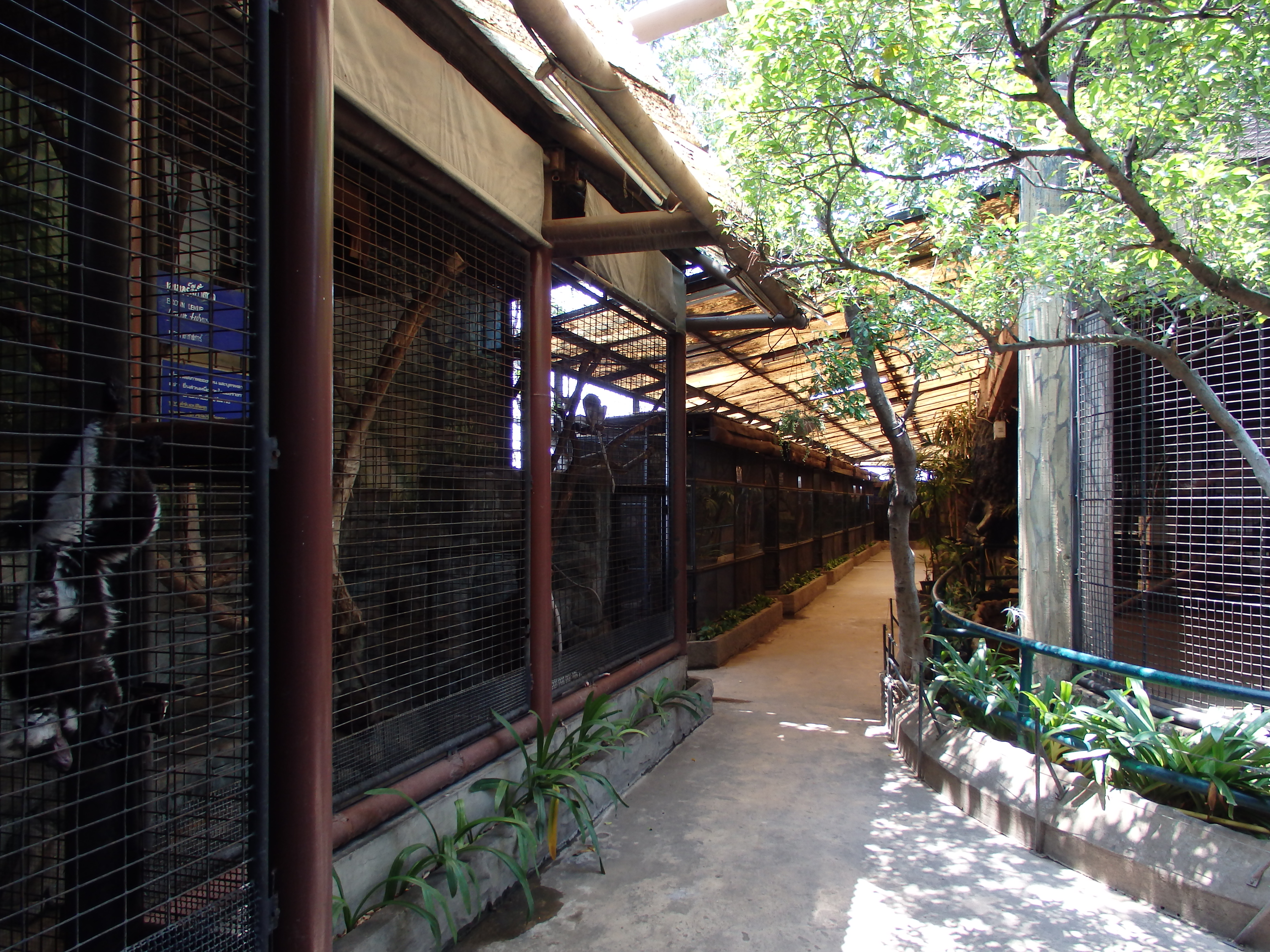
Shaded zoo walkway with mesh enclosures, trees, and monkeys nearby.
