= Bang Yi Khan =

Coordinates: 13°52′56.1″N 100°17′16.6″E

Bang Yi Khan บางยี่ขัน
- Khwaeng
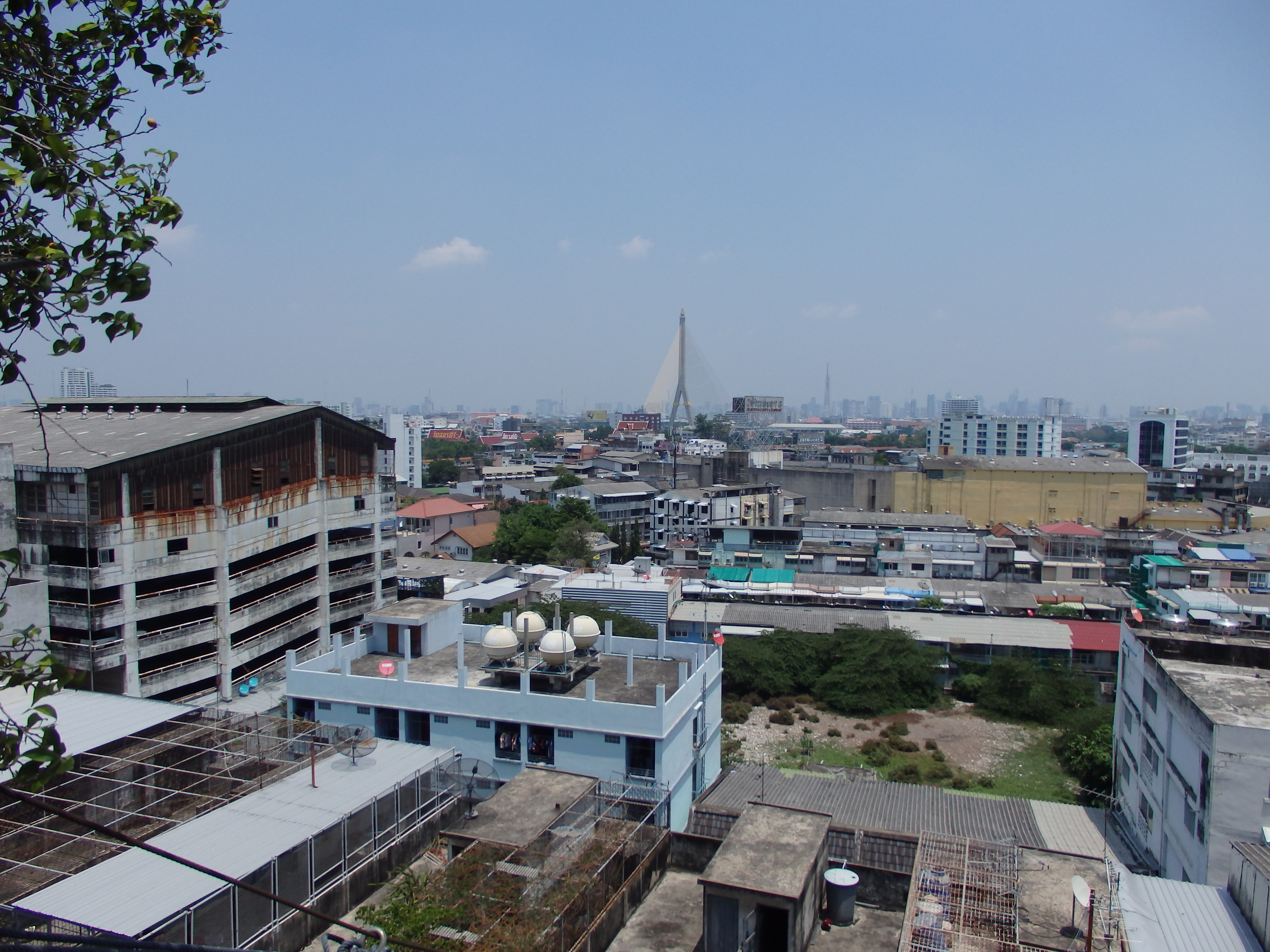
- View of Bang Yi Khan

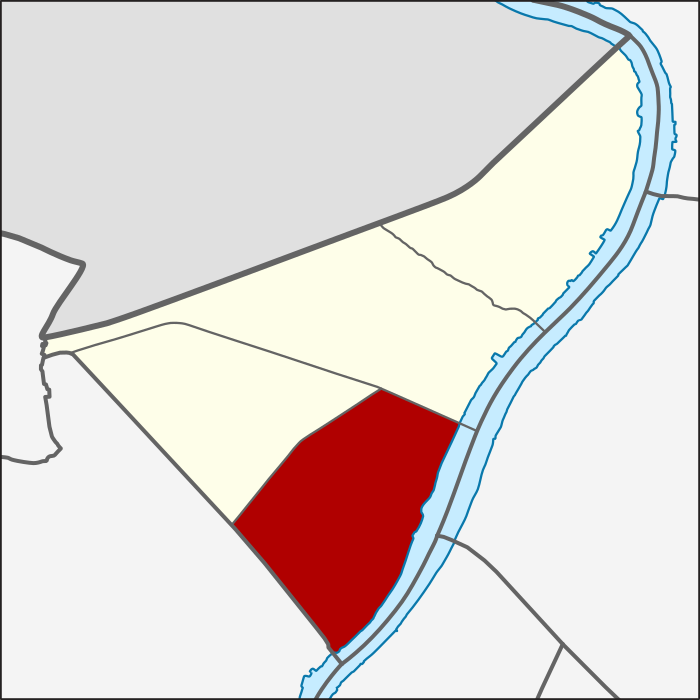
- Location in Bang Phlat District
- Country: Thailand
- Province: Bangkok
- Khet: Bang Phlat

Area
  - Total: 2.886 km^{2} (1.114 sq mi)

Population (2018)
  - Total: 24,745
  - Density: 8,574.15/km^{2} (22,206.9/sq mi)
- Time zone: UTC+7 (ICT)
- Postal code: 10700
- TIS 1099: 102504

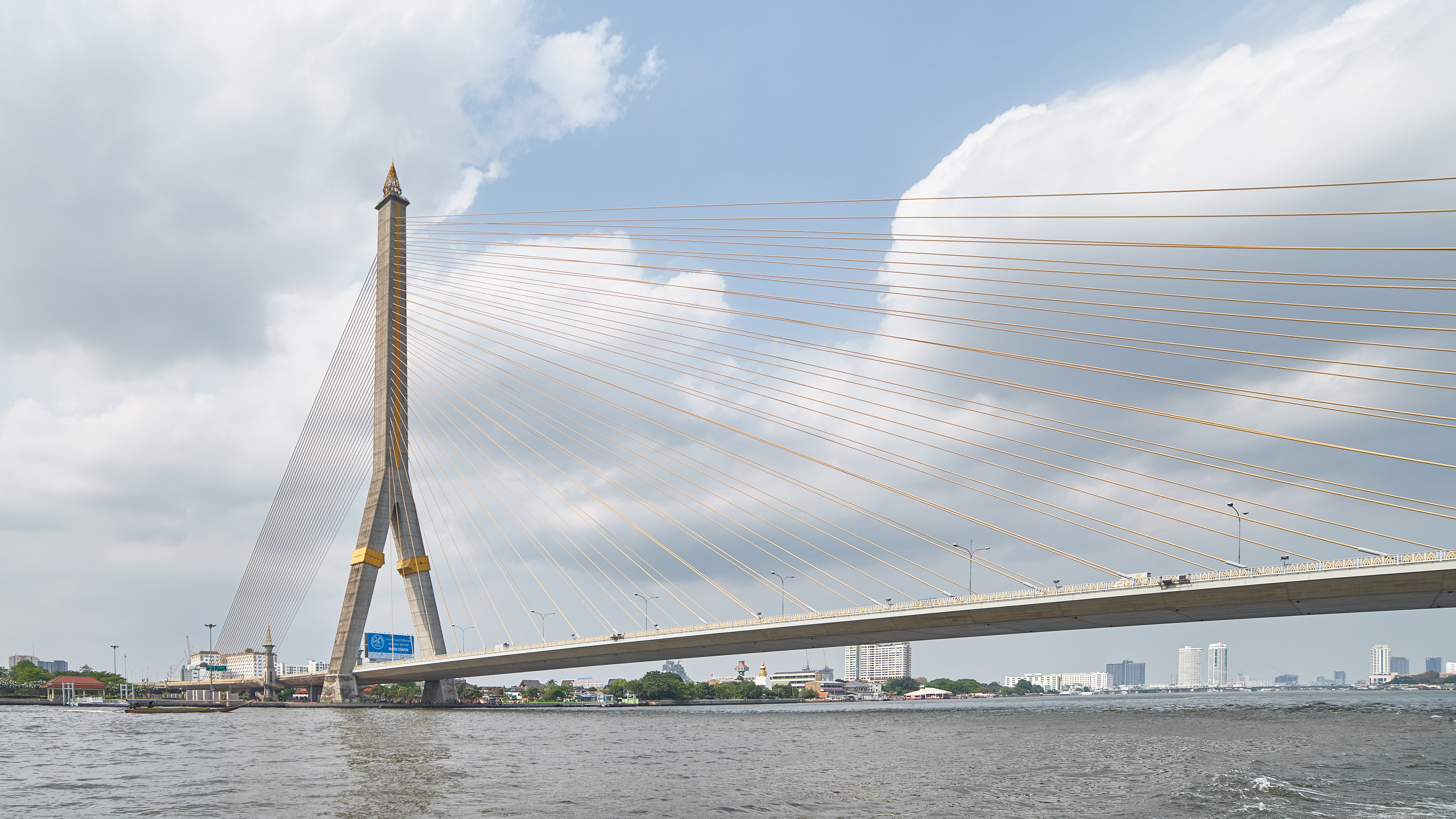
Rama VIII Bridge

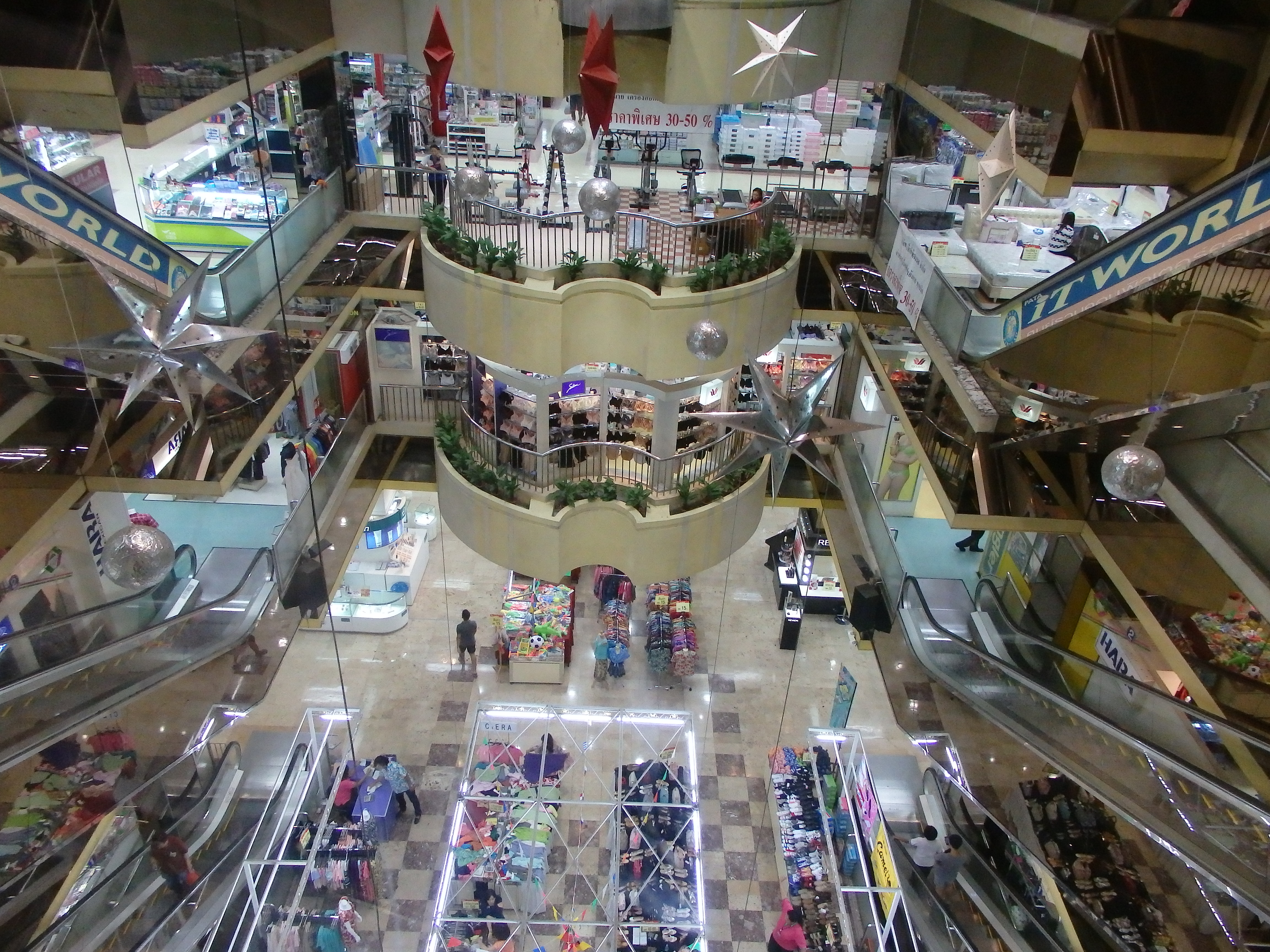
Interior of Pata Department Store

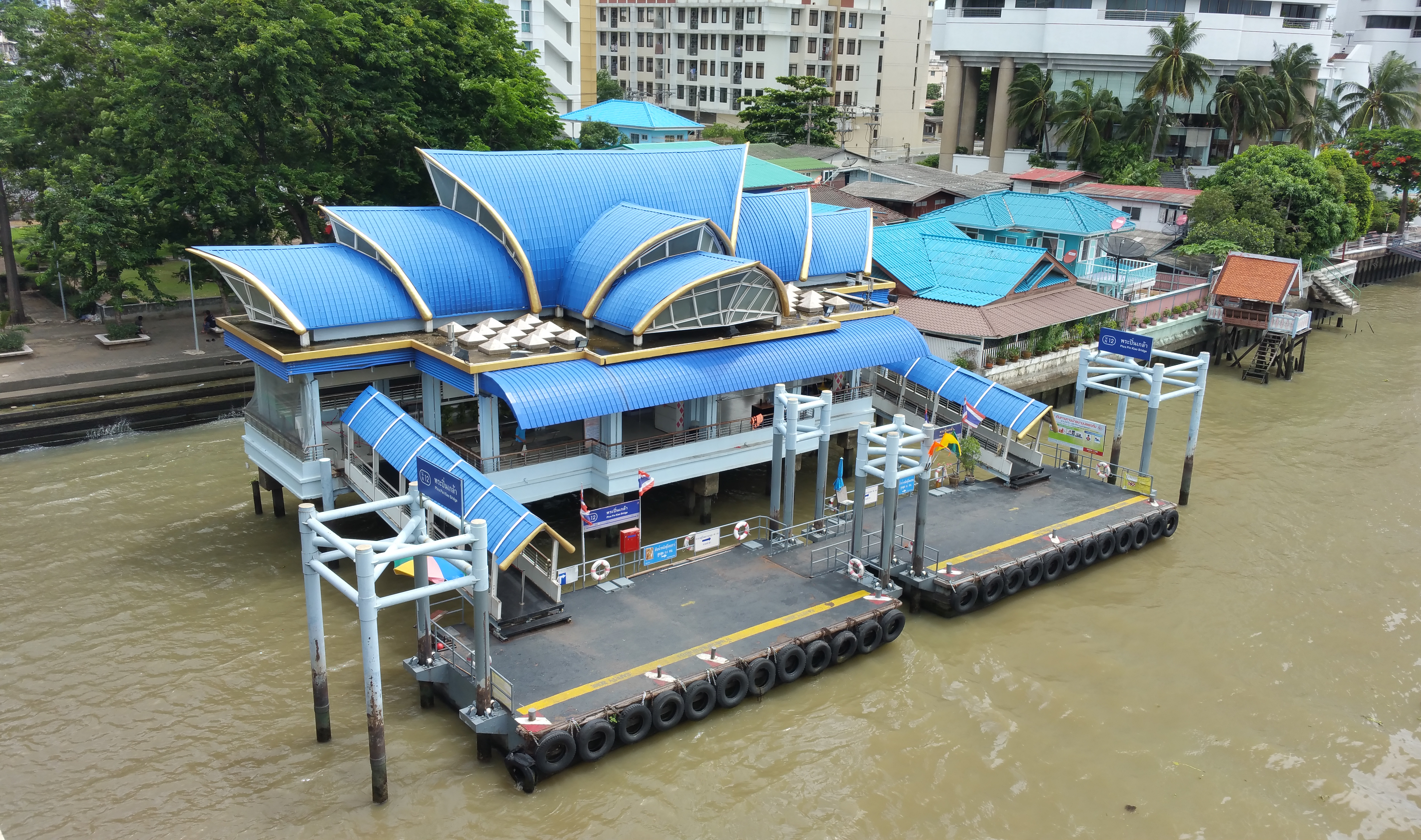
Phra Pin Klao Bridge Pier (N12)

Bang Yi Khan (Thai: บางยี่ขัน, pronounced [bāːŋ jîː kʰǎn]) is a khwaeng (subdistrict) of Bang Phlat District, Bangkok's Thonburi side (west bank of Chao Phraya River).

== History ==
The subdistrict is named after Khlong Bang Yi Khan, a small canal that connects the Chao Phraya River to other nearby canals such as Khlong Bang Bamru, Khlong Bang Chak, and Khlong Pak Nam.

The area dates back to the Ayutthaya period, as evidenced by at least two temples with historical roots from that era: Wat Bang Yi Khan and Wat Phraya Siri Aiya Sawan.

In addition, there is an abandoned temple believed to have been built during the Ayutthaya period as well—Wat Suan Sawan, also known locally as Bot Rang ("abandoned sanctuary").

What made Bang Yi Khan most well known was the location of a liquor factory, believed to have been established during the reign of King Rama I in the early Rattanakosin period. During World War II, this factory came under government supervision and was renamed the "Bang Yi Khan Liquor Factory".

It is said that, in those days, yeast discharged from the factory into the Chao Phraya River attracted toli shad (Tenualosa toli) from the sea into freshwater, where they fed on it.

Today, the liquor factory is no longer in operation; its location has been transformed into Rama VIII Memorial Park, a riverside public park beneath the Rama VIII Bridge with a pleasant atmosphere.

In the past, residents of Bang Yi Khan primarily grew rambutan and produced lime for chewing with betel and areca nut.

The name Pinklao is also commonly used to refer to this area (which overlaps with Arun Amarin and Bang Bamru). The name comes from Phra Pinklao Bridge (often shortened to Pinklao or spelled Pin Klao), which crosses the Chao Phraya River and connects the Thonburi side to the Phra Nakhon side of Bangkok.

== Geography ==
Bang Yi Khan is considered to be an area in the southeast of the district.

The area is bounded by other subdistricts (from north clockwise): Bang Phlat in its district (Ratchawithi Road is a divider line), Wachiraphayaban in Dusit District, Wat Sam Phraya, and Chana Songkhram in Phra Nakhon District (across Chao Phraya River), Arun Amarin in Bangkok Noi District (Somdet Phra Pin Klao Road is a divider line), and Bang Bamru in its district (Charansanitwong Road is a divider line).

Bang Yi Khan is also divided into 13 communities.

Bang Yi Khan Station (BL05), the extension of MRT Blue Line, indeed, it is overlaps between Bang Yi Khan and Bang Bamru.

== Places ==
- Rama VIII Bridge
- Rama VIII Memorial Park and Chaipattana Foundation Headquarters
- Pata Department Store and Pata Zoo
- Phra Pin Klao Bridge and Phra Pin Klao Bridge Pier (N12)
- Faculty of Physical Therapy, Mahidol University
- Wat Daowadueng
- Wat Kharuehabodi
- Phong Sap Market
- Thewphaingarm School
- Khemasiri Memorial School
- Canadian International School of Thailand
- Krung Thon Bridge
- Bang Yi Khan Metropolitan Police Station and Borwornmongkol Metropolitan Police Station
- Praya Palazzo, also known as Ban Bang Yi Khan
