= Bang Phlat subdistrict =

Bang Phlat บางพลัด
- Khwaeng
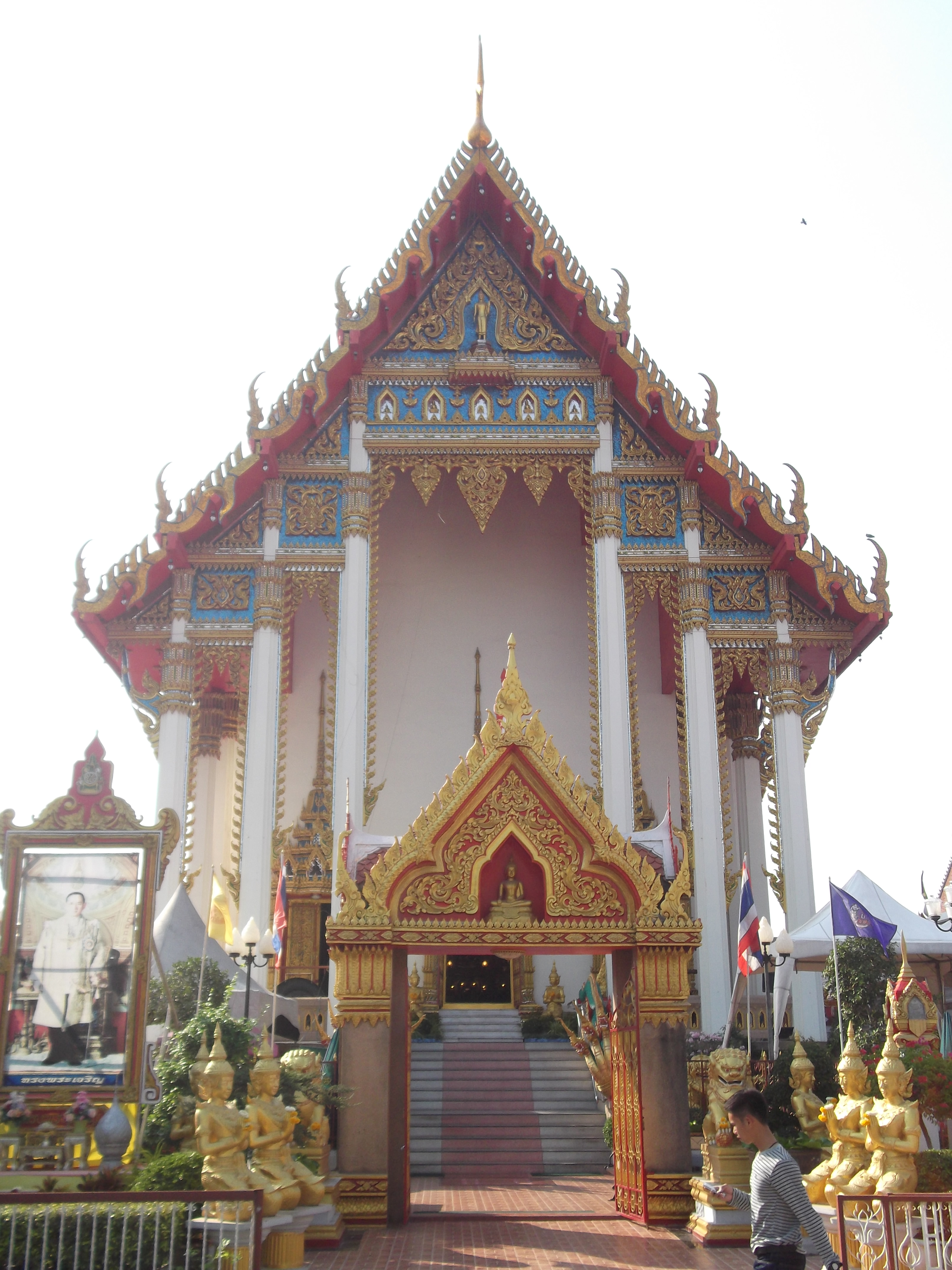
- The local temple Wat Awut Wi Kasi Ta Ram

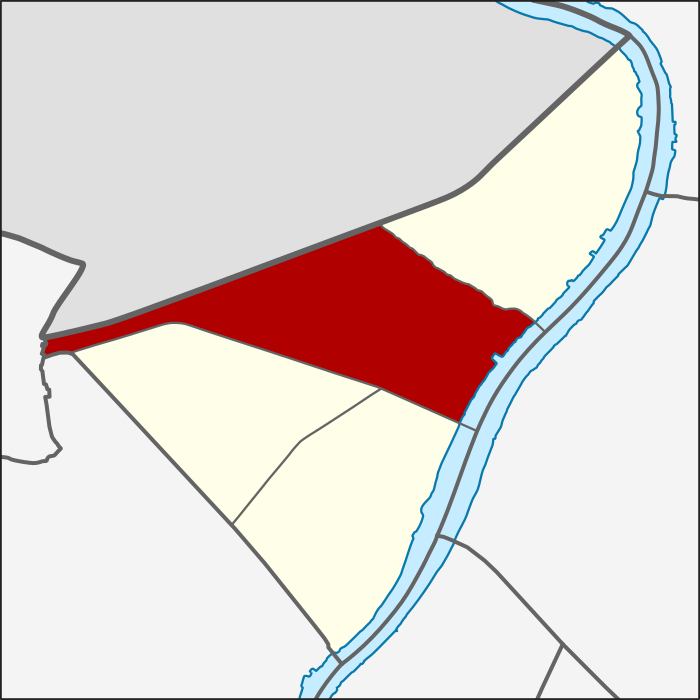
- Location in Bang Phlat District
- Country: Thailand
- Province: Bangkok
- Khet: Bang Phlat

Area
  - Total: 3.296 km^{2} (1.273 sq mi)

Population (2020)
  - Total: 21,953
- Time zone: UTC+7 (ICT)
- Postal code: 10700
- TIS 1099: 102501

Bang Phlat (Thai: บางพลัด, pronounced [bāːŋ pʰlát]) is a khwaeng (subdistrict) of Bang Phlat District, in Bangkok, Thailand. In 2020, it had a total population of 21,953 people.
