= Rama VII Bridge =

Rama VII Bridge สะพานพระราม 7
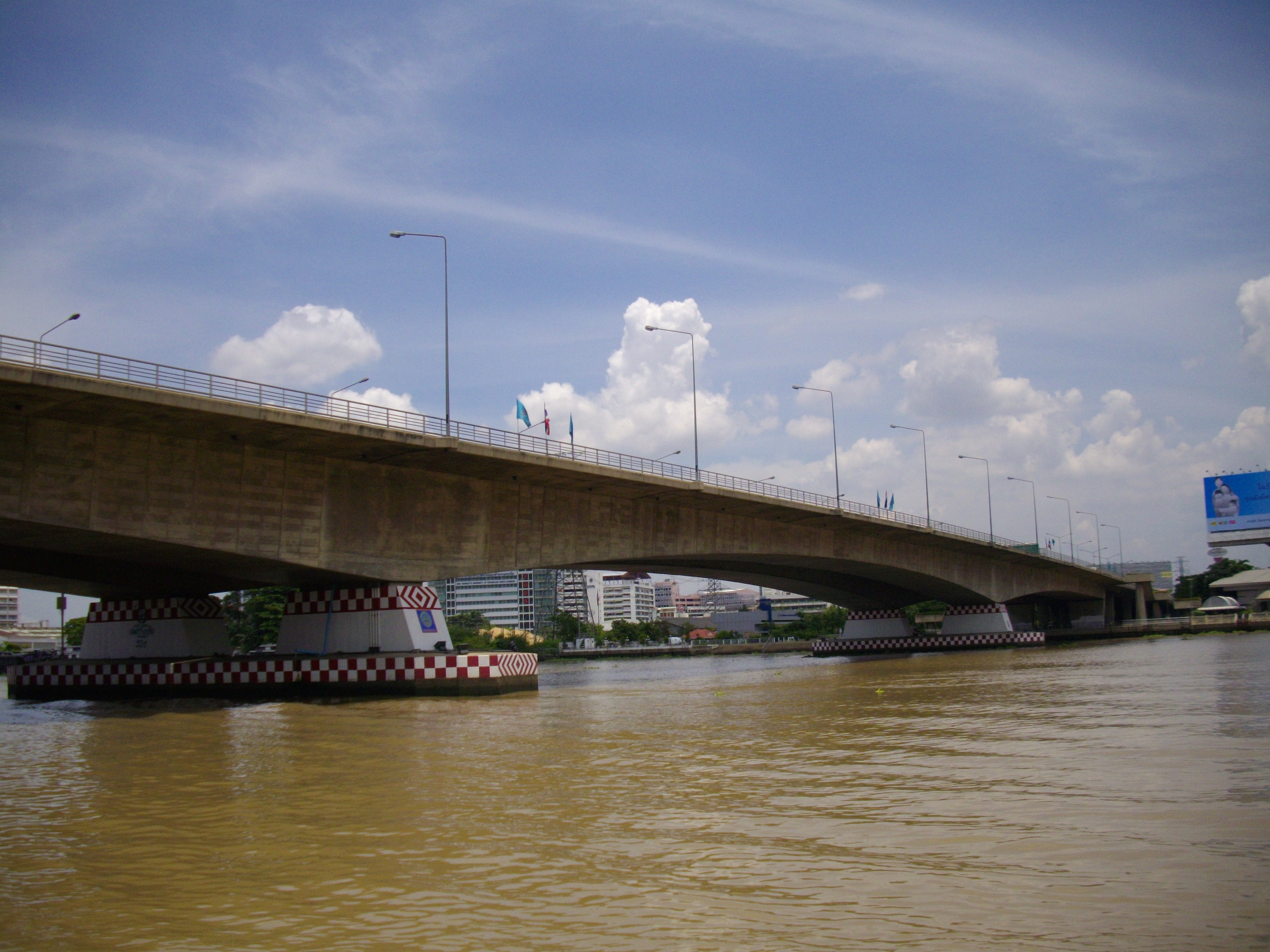
- View from the east bank
- Coordinates: 13.813775°N 100.514442°E
- Carries: 6 lanes of roadway, pedestrians
- Crosses: Chao Phraya River
- Locale: Bang Sue, Bangkok and Bang Kruai, Nonthaburi

Characteristics
- Total length: 933.19 m
- Longest span: 120 m
- Clearance below: 8.9 m

History
- Construction start: January 18, 1990
- Opened: September 23, 1992

Location
- Interactive map of Rama VII Bridge

Rama VII Bridge (Thai: สะพานพระราม 7, RTGS: Saphan Phra Ram Chet, pronounced [sā.pʰāːn pʰráʔ rāːm tɕèt]) is a bridge over the Chao Phraya River in Bangkok and Nonthaburi, in Thailand, connecting the Bang Sue District and Bang Phlat District. The roadway is in a dual carriageway configuration, with 3 lanes in each direction. The bridge was named in honour of King Prajadhipok. The bridge was constructed to ease the increase in road traffic volumes on the adjacent Rama VI bridge.
