= Khae Rai =

Coordinates: 13°51′33″N 100°31′18″E

- แคราย
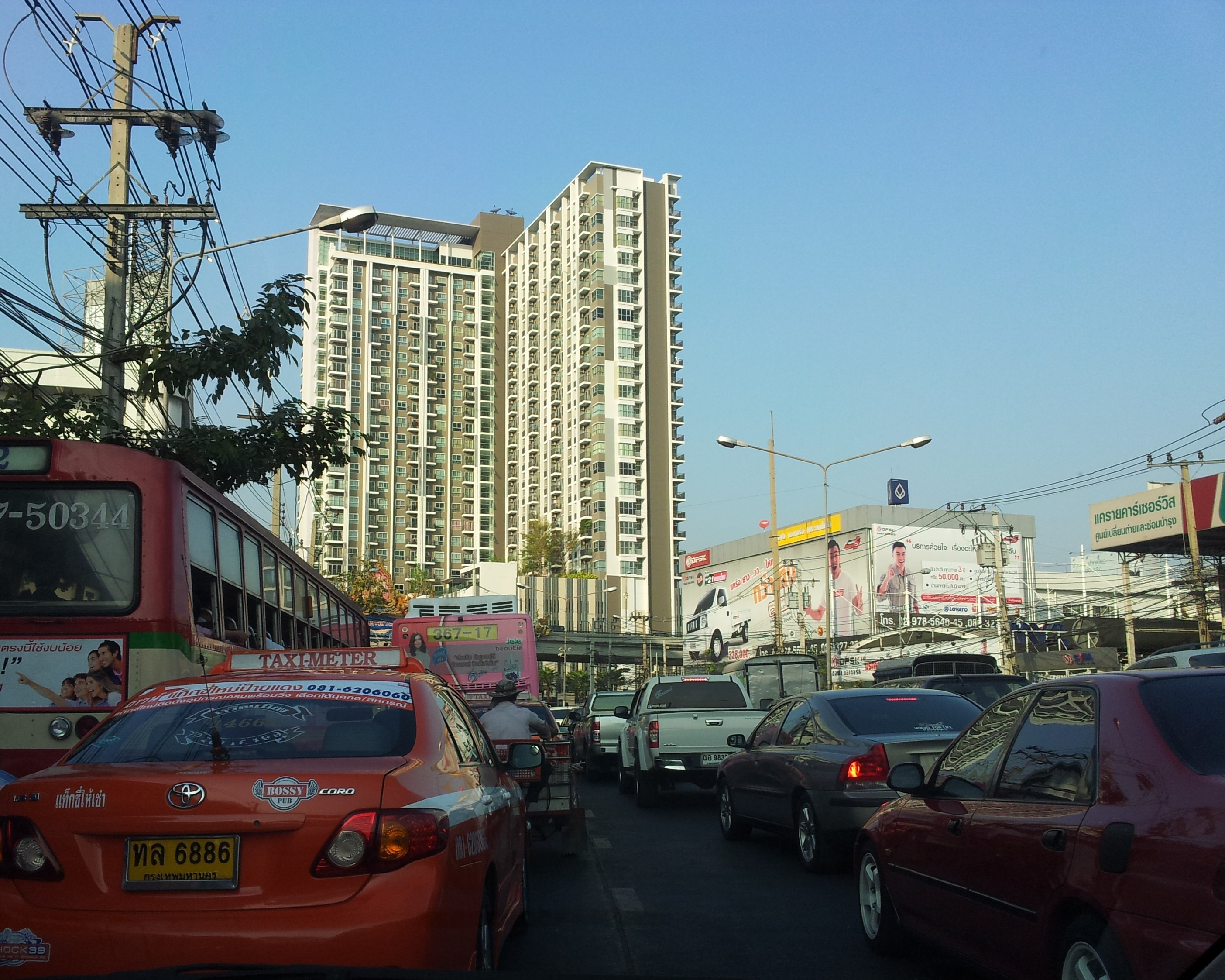
- Khae Rai on the evening of January 31, 2014
- Interactive map of Khae Rai

Location
- Bang Kraso, Mueang Nonthaburi, Nonthaburi, Thailand
- Roads at junction: Ngam Wong Wan (east); Tiwanon (south-west); Rattanathibet (west); Tiwanon (north-west)

Construction
- Type: Four-way at-grade intersection and bidirectional flyover

Khae Rai (Thai: แคราย, pronounced [kʰɛ̄ː rāːj]) is the name of a major road intersection and its surrounding neighborhood in downtown Nonthaburi, a northern suburb city of Bangkok and the administrative seat of Nonthaburi province. Formed by the crossing of Ngam Wong Wan/Rattanathibet and Tiwanon roads, it lies within Bang Kraso subdistrict of Mueang Nonthaburi district, and is home to government offices of both the city and the province as well as commercial and residential developments. It serves as a mass transit interchange between the MRT Purple Line and Pink Line, as well as the planned Brown Line.

== History ==
Khae Rai originated as a three-way junction where the final stretch of Ngam Wong Wan Road (leading from Bang Khen to the east) met Tiwanon Road (which connected Pracharat Road and the old Nonthaburi provincial center to the south, and Pak Kret and Pathum Thani to the north). Both were built as part of a major countrywide transport infrastructure development project initiated by the government of Prime Minister Plaek Phibunsongkhram during the post-World War II period, and were completed and named in 1950. In 1983, Rattanathibet Road was built as a westward extension of Ngam Wong Wan to the Chao Phraya River, thus making it a four-way intersection. There is an overpass along the Ngam Wong Wan–Rattanathibet direction.

In 1992, the government offices of Nonthaburi city and province moved from their old location at Nonthaburi Pier to a new site on Rattanathibet Road, near the intersection. Commercial development gradually arose, mostly as shophouses along the roads, as Khae Rai became a major traffic hub. Real estate development was spurred in 2003 when a rapid transit line passing through the area was included as part of the Bangkok Mass Transit Master Plan, and developers bought up properties for redevelopment into high-rise residential condominiums, several of which now dot the neighborhood.

The intersection is well-known for its traffic jams, as it receives traffic from the western side of the Chao Phraya via Phra Nang Klao Bridge, which have worsened as Bangkok's urban sprawl extended westward across the river. There were plans to build another underpass along the Tiwanon direction but the design was protested by locals in 2008 and was never constructed. In 2016, the overpass was renovated with the addition of a fifth special lane that switches traffic direction during rush hour; The original overpass had 2 lanes in each direction with a concrete barrier in between.

== Name ==
The name Khae Rai had previously been subject to confusion over its proper orthography and etymology, and was for some time spelled and pronounced as Khae Lai (แคลาย, pronounced [kʰɛ̄ː lāːj])—khae being the Thai name of the vegetable hummingbird, a small perennial plant, and lai meaning 'patterned'—based on the assumption that the name came from their white and red flowers which formed patterns like multicoloured fabrics when seen from afar. However, this was often questioned, and the Royal Society of Thailand subsequently determined that the correct spelling from the etymological point of view should be Khae Rai, which means 'lined with vegetable hummingbirds', a reference to the road's landscape during the junction's early days.

== Places ==
The area around Khae Rai is home to a growing number of real estate and public utilities, including condominiums, residential developments, government offices, shopping malls, and shophouses.

The following are located in Nonthaburi Civic Center, located to the west of the intersection:

- Nonthaburi Provincial Hall
- Nonthaburi Provincial Administrative Organization
- Nonthaburi City Municipality Office
- Nonthaburi Provincial Court
- Nonthaburi City Pillar Shrine
- Makut Rommayasaran Park (อุทยานมกุฏรมยสราญ), a public park
- etc.

The following are located in the Ministry of Public Health complex southeast of the intersection:

- Ministry of Public Health
- Food and Drug Administration
- Department of Disease Control
- National Vaccine Institute
- Srithanya Hospital
- Social Security Office Headquarters
- Office of the Civil Service Commission (OCSC)
- etc.

== Mass transit ==
The intersection is a mass transit interchange in Nonthaburi province between MRT Purple Line, Pink Line and Brown Line.

The Purple Line, an elevated heavy rail line, has been in operation since 2016 and has station Nonthaburi Civic Center MRT station on the west of intersection and Ministry of Public Health MRT station further down the south on Tiwanon Road. Pink Line, elevated monorail line has been in service since 21 November 2023, has Nonthaburi Civic Center station as the terminal station on the west and Khae Rai station on the north of intersection on Tiwanon Road. Brown Line, an elevated monorail line, is still in the planned stage with timeline to open in 2027. The line will also start from Nonthaburi Civic Center station on the west with another Ngam Wong Wan 2 station on the east of intersection.

Through all 3 lines share the same exchange station name Nonthaburi Civic Center Station, Purple line's station is located at one corner of Makut Rommayasaran Park on Rattanathibet Road while Pink and Brown lines' are located at the other corner to avoid blocking the view of the park. A 340-meter skywalk links between Purple and Pink/Brown stations while Pink and Brown lines will have about a 45-meter skywalk between the two.
