= Suan Yai =

Suan Yai Subdistrict ตำบลสวนใหญ่
- Subdistrict
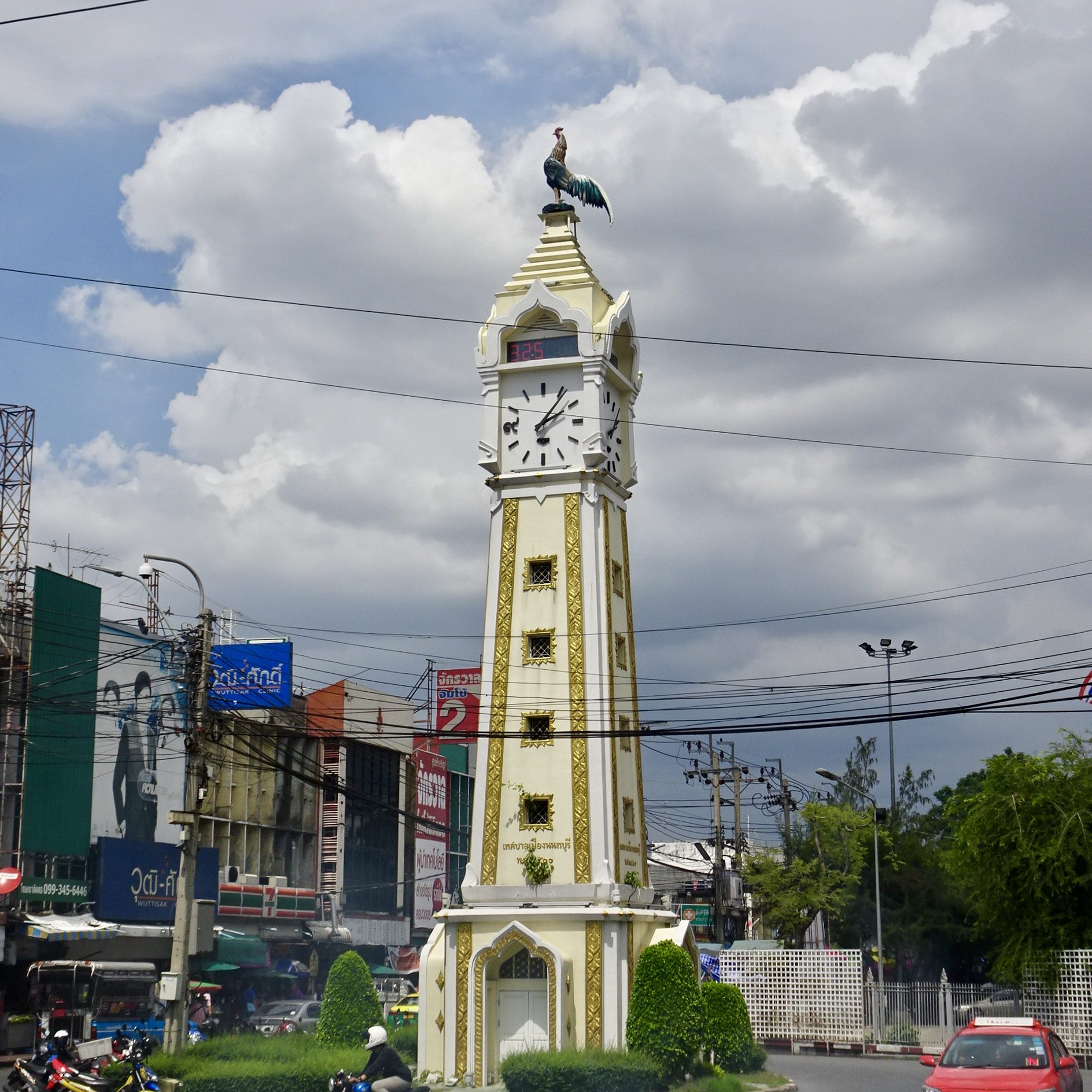
- Nonthaburi Clock Tower, a landmark in the subdistrict
- Country: Thailand
- Province: Nonthaburi
- District: Mueang Nonthaburi

Area
  - Total: 2.5 km^{2} (0.97 sq mi)

Population (2020)
  - Total: 33,706
  - Density: 13,482.4/km^{2} (34,919/sq mi)
- Time zone: UTC+7 (ICT)
- Postal code: 11000
- TIS 1099: 120101

Suan Yai (Thai: สวนใหญ่, pronounced [sǔa̯n jàj]) is one of the ten subdistricts (tambon) of Mueang Nonthaburi District, in Nonthaburi Province, Thailand. The subdistrict is bounded by (clockwise from north) Bang Kraso, Talat Khwan, Bang Khen, Wong Sawang, and across the Chao Phraya River, Bang Kruai, Bang Phai, Bang Si Mueang and Sai Ma subdistricts. The whole area of the subdistrict is covered by Nonthaburi City Municipality (เทศบาลนครนนทบุรี). In 2020 it had a total population of 33,706 people.
