= Yaek Tiwanon MRT station =

Monorail station in Thailand

แยกติวานนท์ PP13 Yaek Tiwanon
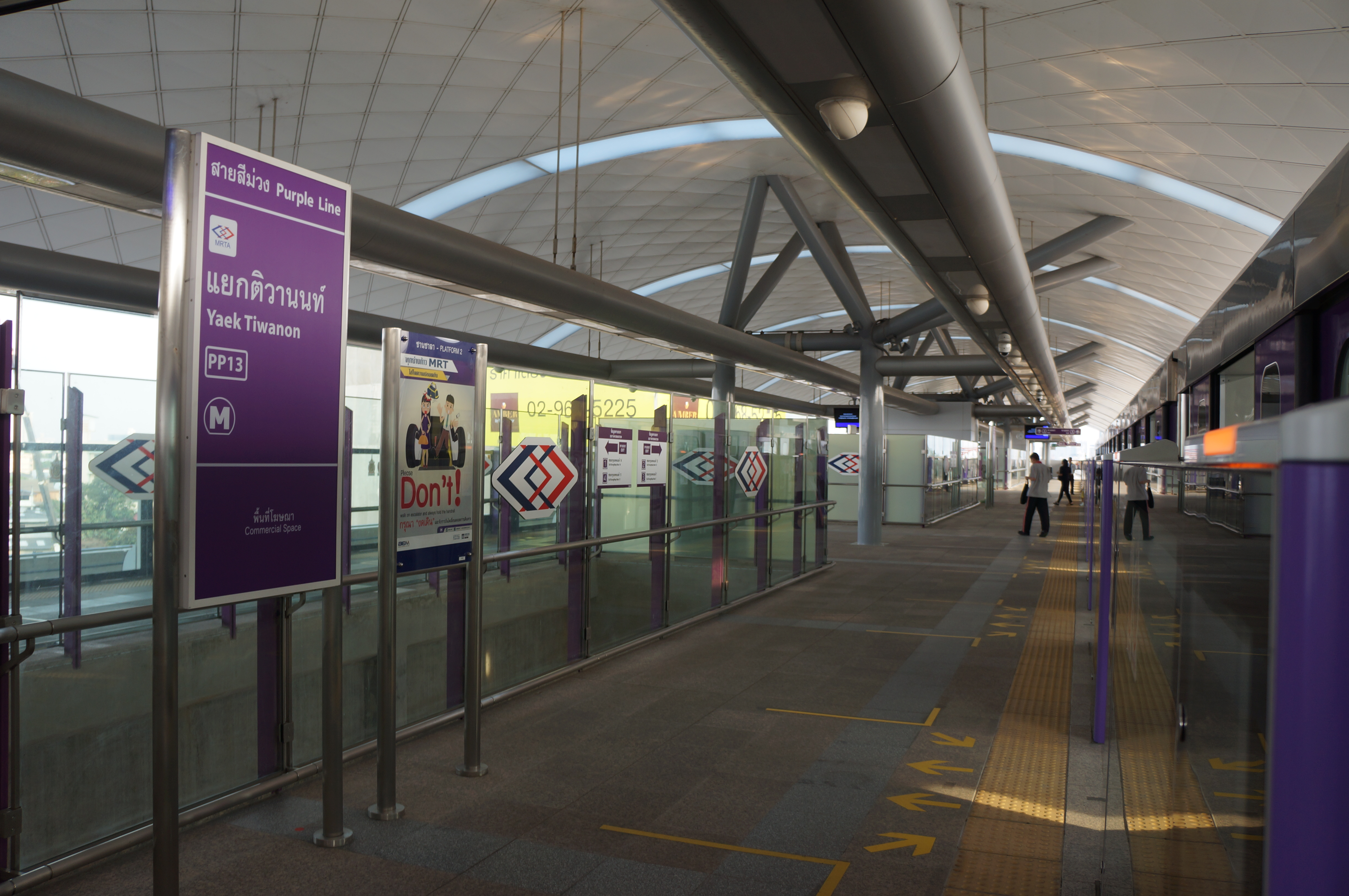
- Platform

General information
- Location: Bang Khen, Mueang Nonthaburi, Nonthaburi, Thailand
- Coordinates: 13°50′22.4″N 100°30′54.0″E
- System: | MRT
- Owner: Mass Rapid Transit Authority of Thailand
- Operator: Bangkok Expressway and Metro Public Company Limited
- Line: Purple Line
- Platforms: 2 (1 island platform)
- Tracks: 2
- Connections: Bus, Taxi

Construction
- Structure type: Elevated
- Parking: Not available
- Cycle facilities: Available
- Accessible: yes

Other information
- Station code: PP13

History
- Opened: 6 August 2016; 10 years ago

Passengers
- 2021: 754,113

Services
Preceding station	Metropolitan Rapid Transit	Following station
Ministry of Public Health towards Khlong Bang Phai	Purple Line	Wong Sawang towards Tao Poon
Location

Yaek Tiwanon station (Thai: สถานีแยกติวานนท์) is a Bangkok MRT station on the Purple Line. The station opened on 6 August 2016 and is located on Bangkok-Nonthaburi road, near its intersection with Tiwanon Road in Nonthaburi Province. The station has four entrances.
