= Nonthaburi Civic Center MRT station =

Monorail station in Thailand

ศูนย์ราชการนนทบุรี PP11 Nonthaburi Civic Centre PK01
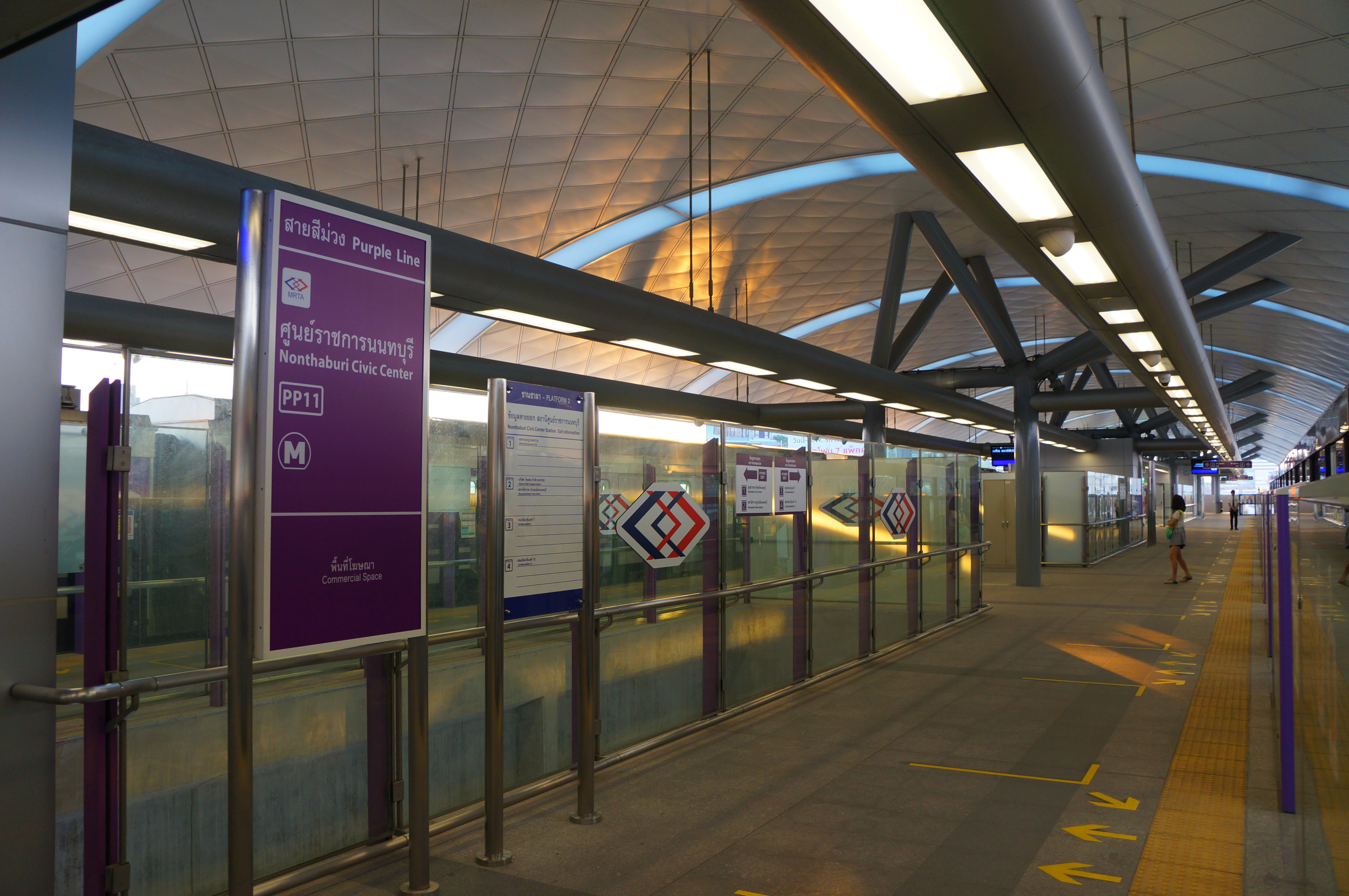
- Purple Line Platforms

General information
- Location: Bang Kraso, Mueang Nonthaburi, Nonthaburi, Thailand
- Coordinates: 13°51′36.6″N 100°30′47.5″E (Purple Line); 13°51′34.7″N 100°31′05.5″E (Pink Line)
- System: | MRT MRT
- Owner: Mass Rapid Transit Authority of Thailand
- Operator: Bangkok Expressway and Metro Public Company Limited (Purple); Northern Bangkok Monorail Company Limited (Pink)
- Lines: Purple Line; Pink Line
- Platforms: 4 (1 island platform, 2 side platforms)
- Tracks: 4

Construction
- Structure type: Elevated
- Parking: Not available
- Cycle facilities: Available
- Accessible: yes

Other information
- Station code: PP11 PK01

History
- Opened: 6 August 2016; 10 years ago (Purple Line); 21 November 2023; 2 years ago (Purple Line)

Passengers
- 2021: 915,763 (Purple)

Services
Preceding station	Metropolitan Rapid Transit	Following station
Bang Krasor towards Khlong Bang Phai	Purple Line	Ministry of Public Health towards Tao Poon
Terminus	Pink Line	Khae Rai towards Min Buri
Location

Nonthaburi Civic Center Station Purple Line signage

Nonthaburi Civic Center station (Thai: สถานีศูนย์ราชการนนทบุรี, RTGS: Sathani Sun Ratchakan Nonthaburi) is the name of two Bangkok MRT stations, on the Purple Line and Pink Line. The stations are located on Rattanathibet Road in Nonthaburi Province. The station opened on 6 August 2016 on the Purple Line, while the Pink Line station opened on 21 November 2023.

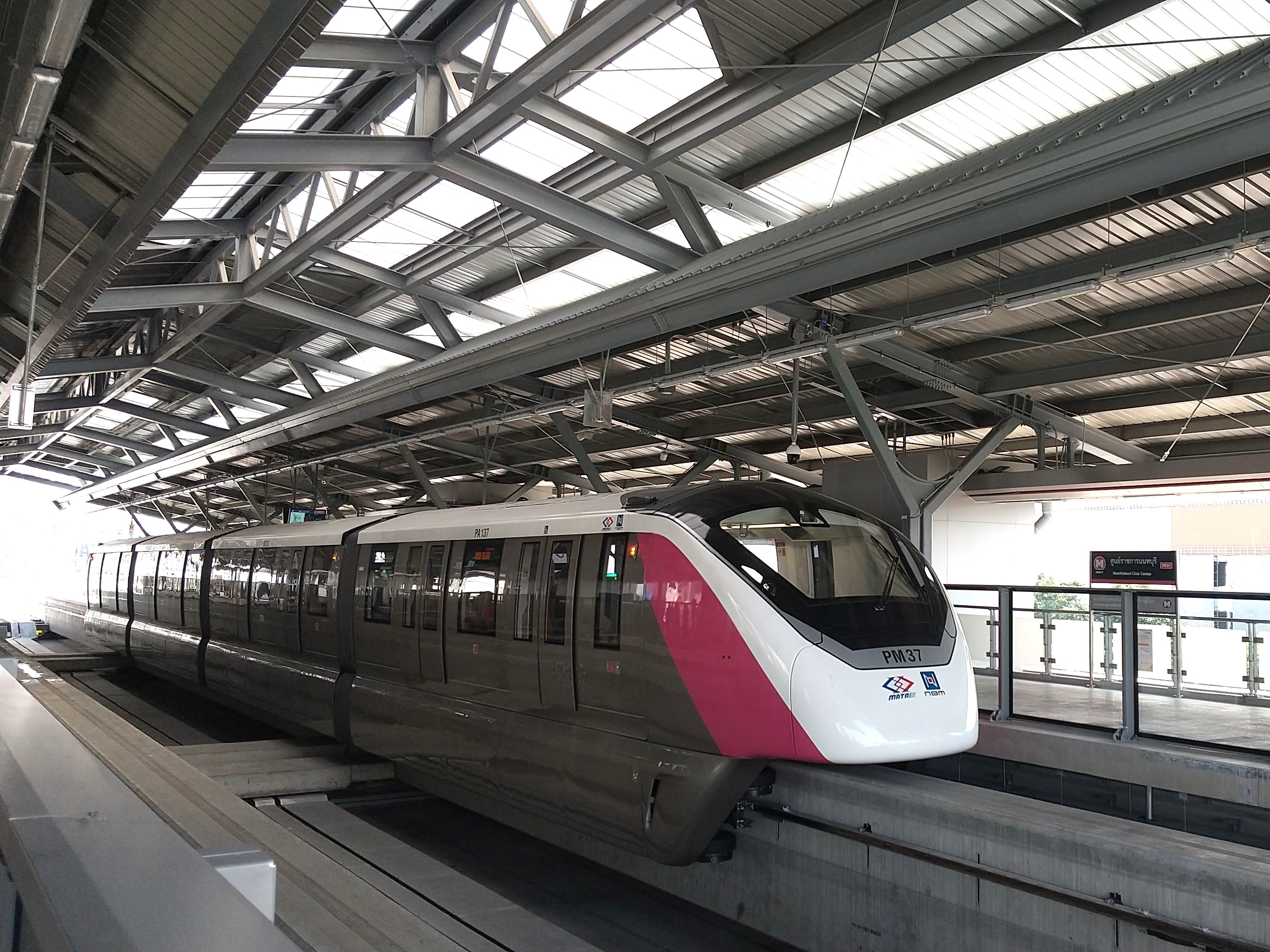
Pink Line Platforms

The stations are above the Rattanathibet road not far from Khae Rai intersection. To the north, the Purple Line station serves commuters from the Mueang Nonthaburi District Office. To the south, it serves the Samakkhi residential area, Boss Hotel, Provincial Police station, the National Disaster Warning Center and the Thaicom satellite station. The Pink Line station provides access to Esplanade Cineplex Ngamwongwan-Khaerai and the nearby Tesco Lotus hypermarket.
