= Somdet Chao Phraya =

Somdet Chao Phraya may refer to:

- Somdet Chao Phraya, a title of the Thai nobility
- Somdet Chao Phraya Subdistrict, a subdistrict (khwaeng) of Bangkok
- Somdet Chaopraya Institute of Psychiatry, a psychiatric hospital in Bangkok
