= Tha Sai, Nonthaburi =

Tha Sai Subdistrict ตำบลท่าทราย
- Subdistrict
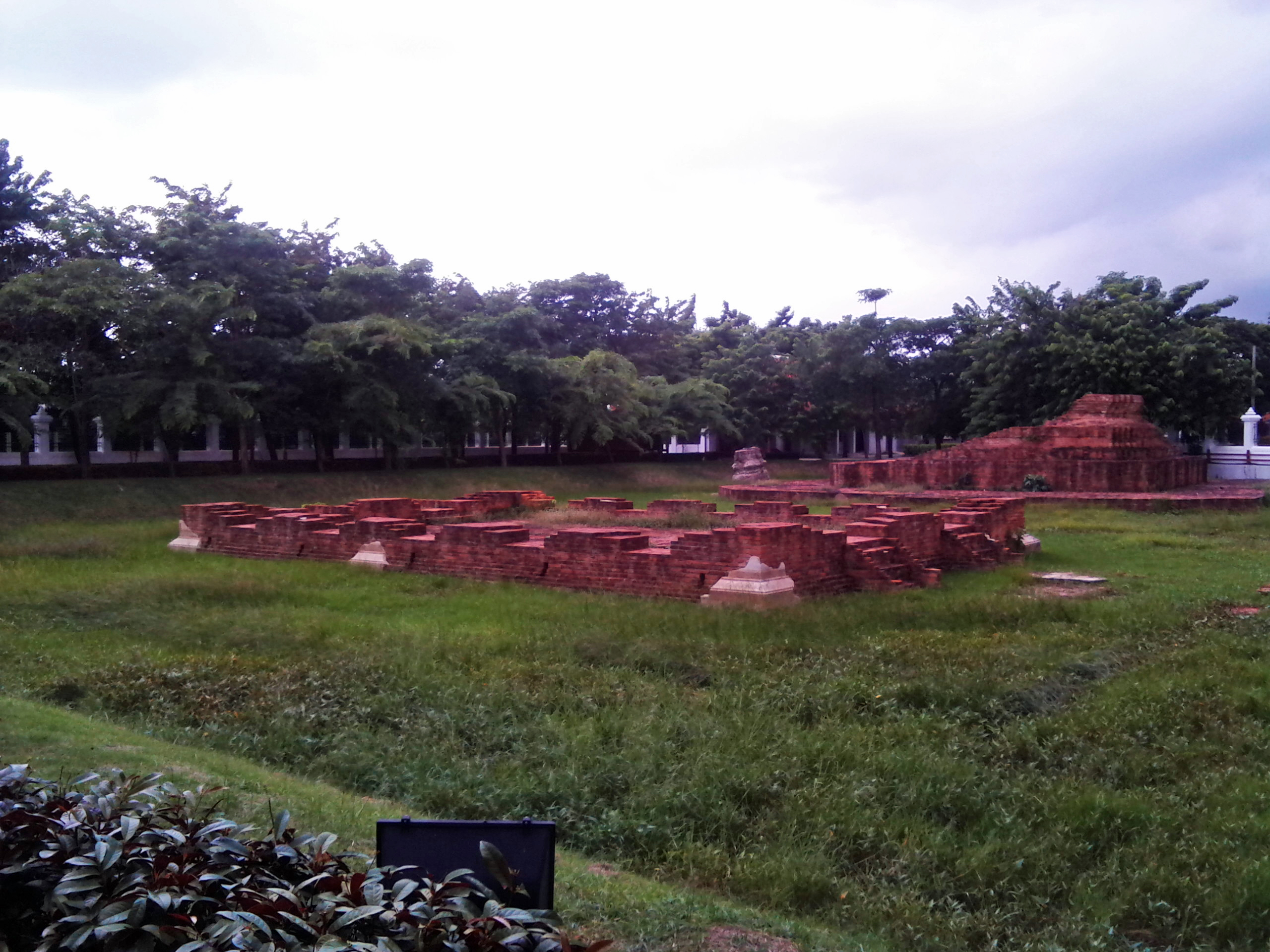
- Buddhist Site of Choeng Tha–Na Bot
- Country: Thailand
- Province: Nonthaburi
- District: Mueang Nonthaburi

Area
  - Total: 8 km^{2} (3.1 sq mi)

Population (2020)
  - Total: 69,827
  - Density: 8,728.38/km^{2} (22,606.4/sq mi)
- Time zone: UTC+7 (ICT)
- Postal code: 11000
- TIS 1099: 120105

Tha Sai (Thai: ท่าทราย, pronounced [tʰâː sāːj]) is one of the ten subdistricts (tambon) of Mueang Nonthaburi District, in Nonthaburi Province, Thailand. The subdistrict is bounded by (clockwise from north) Bang Talat, Thung Song Hong, Bang Khen, Bang Kraso, and across the Chao Phraya River, Tha It subdistricts. The whole area of the subdistrict is covered by Nonthaburi City Municipality (เทศบาลนครนนทบุรี). In 2020 it had a total population of 69,827 people.
