= Bang Khen subdistrict =

Bang Khen Subdistrict ตำบลบางเขน
- Subdistrict
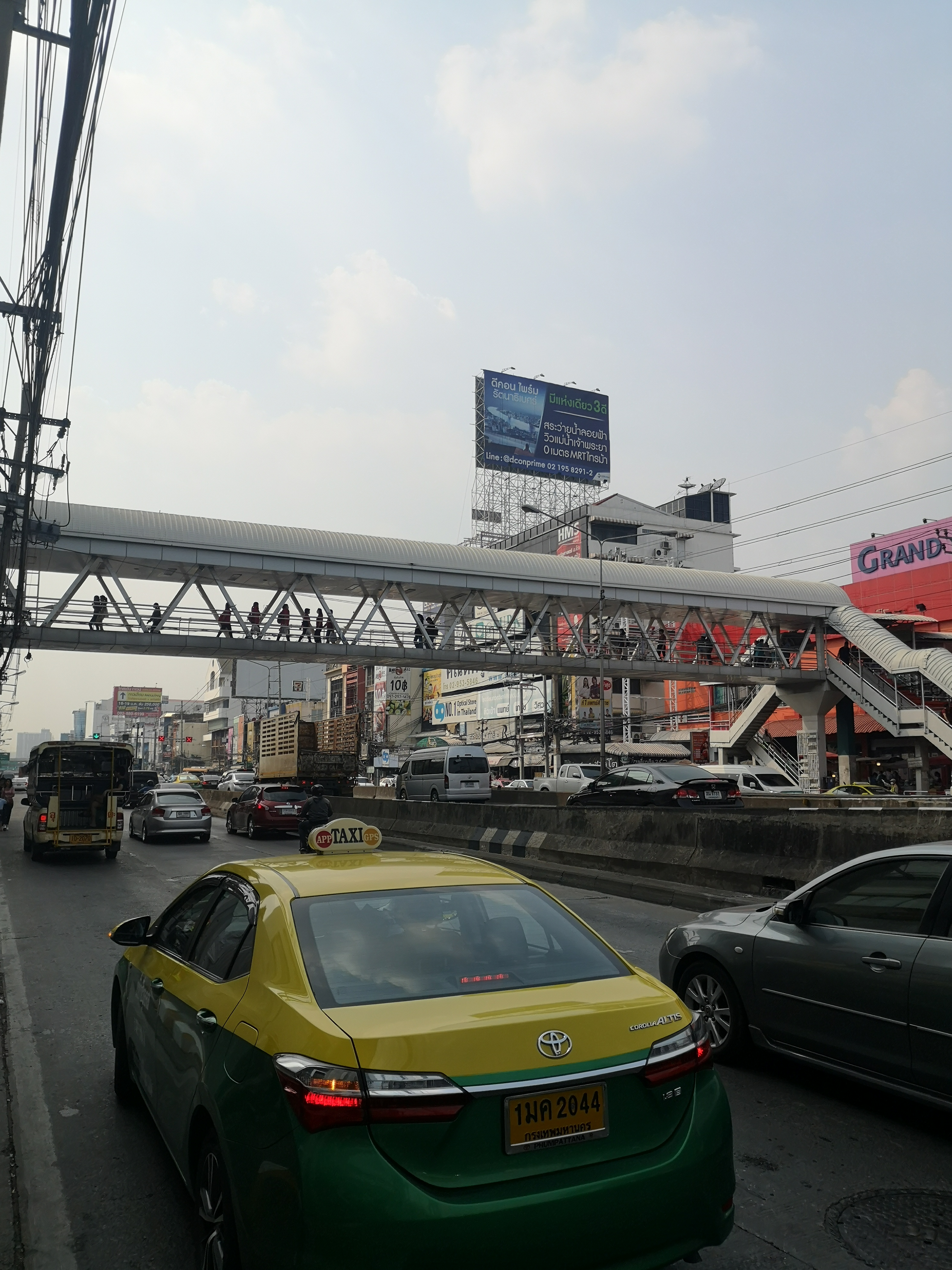
- Ngam Wong Wan Road in the subdistrict
- Interactive map of Bang Khen Subdistrict
- Country: Thailand
- Province: Nonthaburi
- District: Mueang Nonthaburi

Area
  - Total: 9 km^{2} (3.5 sq mi)

Population (2020)
  - Total: 42,600
  - Density: 4,733.33/km^{2} (12,259.3/sq mi)
- Time zone: UTC+7 (ICT)
- Postal code: 11000
- TIS 1099: 120103

Bang Khen (Thai: บางเขน, pronounced [bāːŋ kʰěːn]) is one of the ten subdistricts (tambon) of Mueang Nonthaburi District, in Nonthaburi Province, Thailand. The subdistrict is bounded by (clockwise from north) Tha Sai, Thung Song Hong, Lat Yao, Wong Sawang, Suan Yai, Talat Khwan and Bang Kraso subdistricts. The whole area of the subdistrict is covered by Nonthaburi City Municipality (เทศบาลนครนนทบุรี). In 2020, it had a total population of 42,600 people.
