= Ministry of Public Health MRT station =

Monorail station in Thailand

กระทรวงสาธารณสุข PP12 Ministry of Public Health
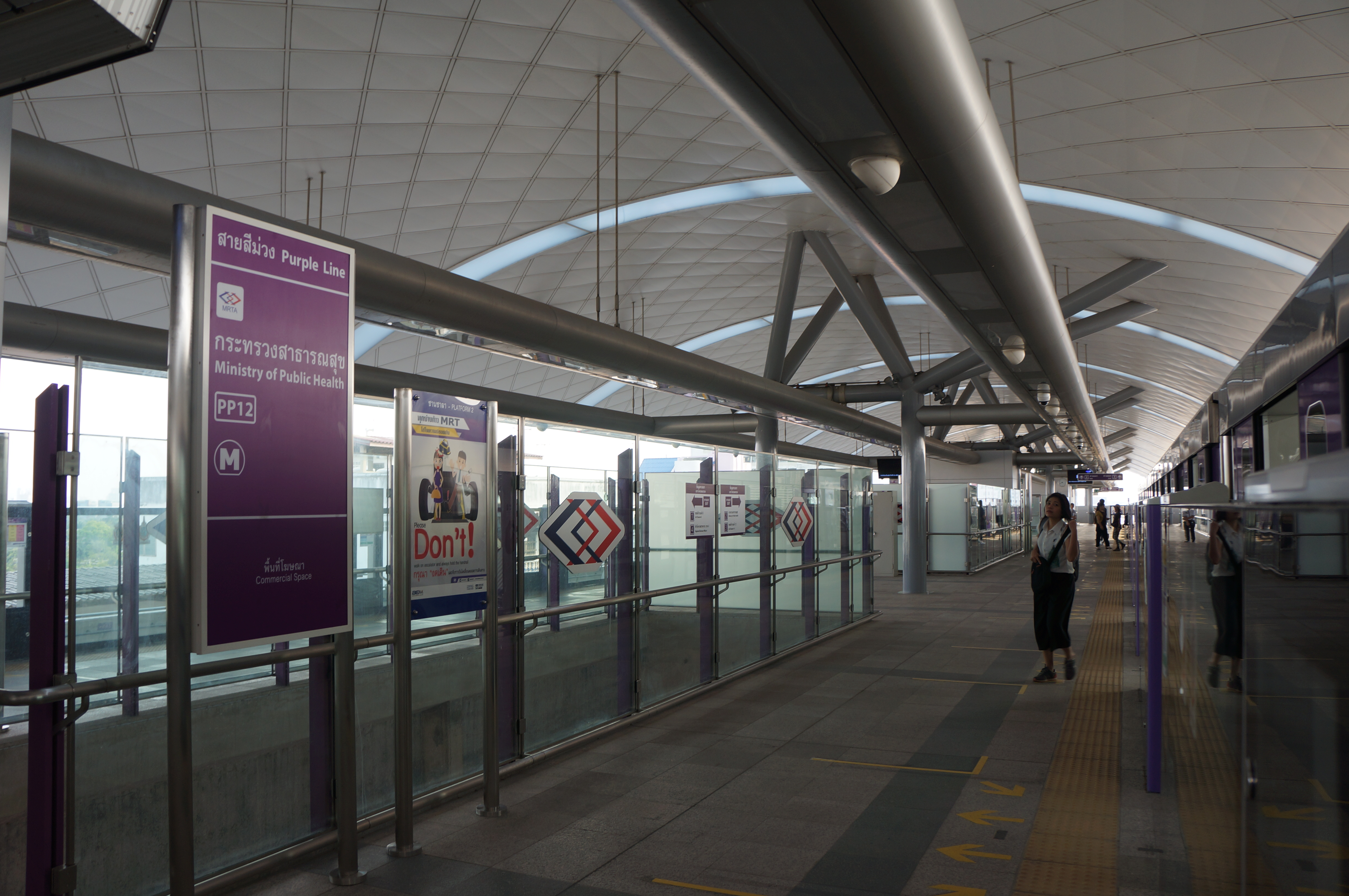
- Platform

General information
- Location: Talat Khwan, Mueang Nonthaburi, Nonthaburi, Thailand
- Coordinates: 13°50′55.0″N 100°30′53.4″E
- System: | MRT
- Owner: Mass Rapid Transit Authority of Thailand
- Operator: Bangkok Expressway and Metro Public Company Limited
- Line: MRT Purple Line
- Platforms: 2 (1 island platform)
- Tracks: 2
- Connections: Bus, Taxi

Construction
- Structure type: Elevated
- Parking: Not available
- Cycle facilities: Available
- Accessible: yes

Other information
- Station code: PP12

History
- Opened: 6 August 2016; 10 years ago

Passengers
- 2021: 1,269,044

Services
Preceding station	Metropolitan Rapid Transit	Following station
Nonthaburi Civic Center towards Khlong Bang Phai	Purple Line	Yaek Tiwanon towards Tao Poon
Location

Ministry of Public Health station (Thai: สถานีกระทรวงสาธารณสุข, RTGS: Sathani Krasuang Satharanasuk) is a Bangkok MRT station on the Purple Line. The station opened on 6 August 2016 and is located on Tiwanon road in Nonthaburi Province. The station has four entrances. It is located near the headquarters of the Ministry of Public Health, in front of Srithanya Hospital.
