= Srithanya Hospital =

Psychiatric hospital in Nonthaburi, Thailand

Srithanya Hospital โรงพยาบาลศรีธัญญา
- Department of Mental Health, MOPH

Geography
- Location: 47 Mu 4, Talat Khwan Subdistrict, Mueang Nonthaburi District, Nonthaburi, Thailand
- Coordinates: 13.846255°N 100.516697°E

Services
- Beds: 750

History
- Former name: Nonthaburi Psychiatric Hospital
- Founded: 24 June 1941

Links
- Website: www.srithanya.go.th

Srithanya Hospital (Thai: โรงพยาบาลศรีธัญญา) is the largest psychiatric hospital in Thailand, located in Mueang Nonthaburi District, Nonthaburi Province. It is adjacent to the headquarters of the Ministry of Public Health and is operated by the Department of Mental Health (DMH). It is served by Ministry of Public Health MRT station, located in front of the hospital.

== History ==
The hospital was first planned out by Luang Vichian Phaethayakom and was opened on 24 June 1941 as the Nonthaburi Psychiatric Hospital with 150 beds. It first received male patients with chronic psychiatric disorders transferred from the Thon Buri Psychosis Hospital (now the Somdet Chaopraya Institute of Psychiatry) in Bangkok, and prisoners from Nonthaburi Prison for rehabilitation. On 10 March 1941, operations were transferred to the DMH. In 1954, the name of the hospital was changed to Srithanya Hospital, to reduce the stigma for patients visiting psychiatric hospitals for treatment. In 2021, there were a total of 127,845 outpatients treated at the hospital.

== See also ==
- Healthcare in Thailand
- Hospitals in Thailand
- Somdet Chaopraya Institute of Psychiatry
