= Highway 302 (Thailand) =

Road in Thailand

National Highway 302
- ทางหลวงแผ่นดินหมายเลข 302

Route information
- Length: 17.808 km (11.065 mi)
- Existed: 1985–present

Major junctions
- West end: AH2 / in Bang Yai, Nonthaburi
- Ratchaphruek Road; Tiwanon Road; Si Rat Expressway; Vibhavadi Rangsit Road; Phahonyothin Road
- East end: in Chatuchak, Bangkok

Location
- Country: Thailand
- Major cities: Bang Bua Thong, Mueang Nonthaburi, Lak Si

Highway system
- Highways in Thailand; Motorways; Asian Highways

Highway 302 is a national highway in greater Bangkok, Thailand. It includes two connecting roads: Rattanathibet Road and Ngam Wong Wan Road.

Route 302 is 17.808 kilometres (11.065 mi) long, of which 15.12 kilometres (9.40 mi) is in Nonthaburi, and 2.688 kilometres (1.670 mi) is in Bangkok.

== Rattanathibet Road ==
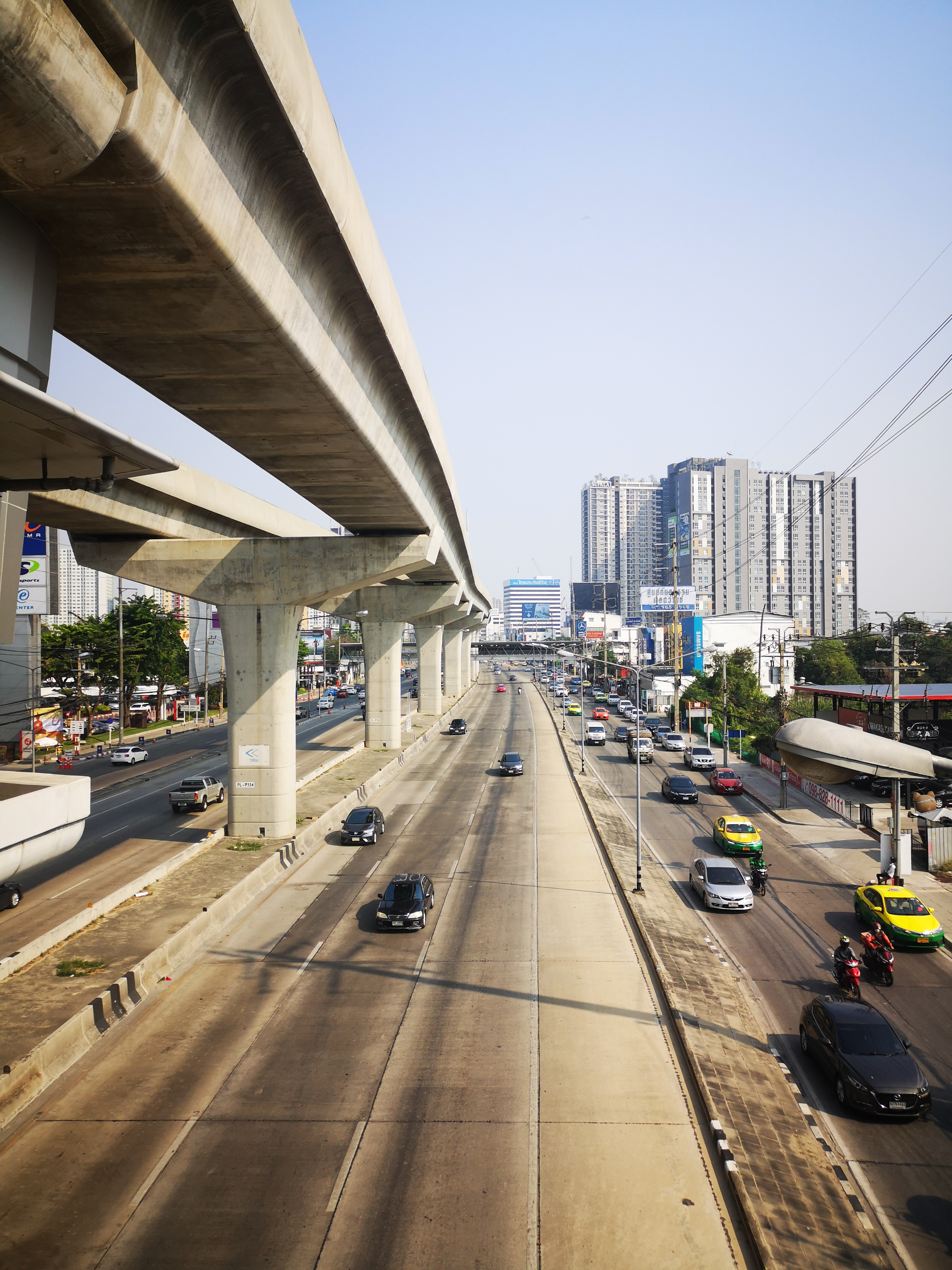
Rattanathibet Road near Central Rattanathibet (present-day Central NorthVille) in 2020

Rattanathibet Road (Thai: ถนนรัตนาธิเบศร์) starts at Kanchanaphisek Road (Motorway Route 9) and Motorway Route 81 (Bang Yai-Kanchanaburi) in Sao Thong Hin subdistrict, Bang Yai District, Nonthaburi, and runs east through Bang Bua Thong District, passes Bang Kruai - Sai Noi Road (Route 3215) at Bang Phlu intersection (Thai: ถนนบางกรวย - ไทรน้อย) and Mueang Nonthaburi district, passes Ratchaphruek Road (Thai: ถนนราชพฤกษ์) at Bang Rak Noi intersection and crosses the Chao Phraya River on the Phra Nang Klao Bridge and Phra Nang Klao Parallel Bridge, passes Nonthaburi 1 Road (Thai: ถนนนนทบุรี 1) (Route 3110) and passes Liang Mueang Nonthaburi Road and continues east until it ends at Khae Rai intersection, where it intersects with Tiwanon Road (Route 306) and the route continues as Ngam Wong Wan Road.

== Ngam Wong Wan Road ==
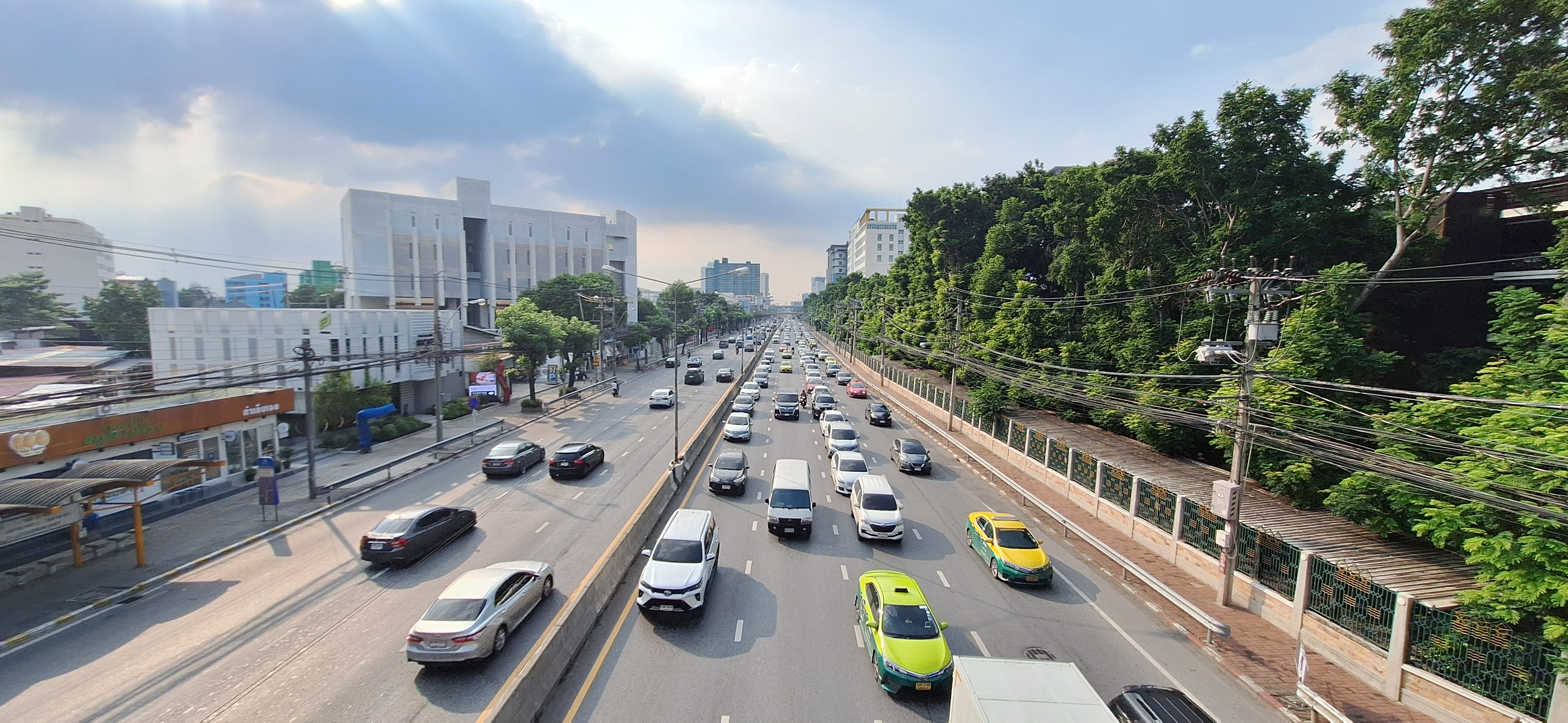
Ngam Wong Wan Road in the Kasetsart University area in 2024

Ngam Wong Wan Road (Thai: ถนนงามวงศ์วาน) continues east from Rattanathibet Road at Khae Rai intersection in Nonthaburi, crossing into Bangkok at Lak Si District, then passing through Chatuchak District, ending at Kaset intersection, where it intersects with Phahonyothin Road. Via a bypass tunnel beneath Kasetsart, the road continues as Prasoet Manukit Road (Thailand Route 351).

Ngam Wong Wan Road is named for Damrong Ngamwongwan (Thai: ดำรง งามวงศ์วาน), a Department of Highways engineer who oversaw construction of the road. It was a policy of the Plaek Phibunsongkhram government that new roads be named for their chief engineers.
