= Wong Sawang MRT station =

Monorail station in Bangkok, Thailand

วงศ์สว่าง PP14 Wong Sawang
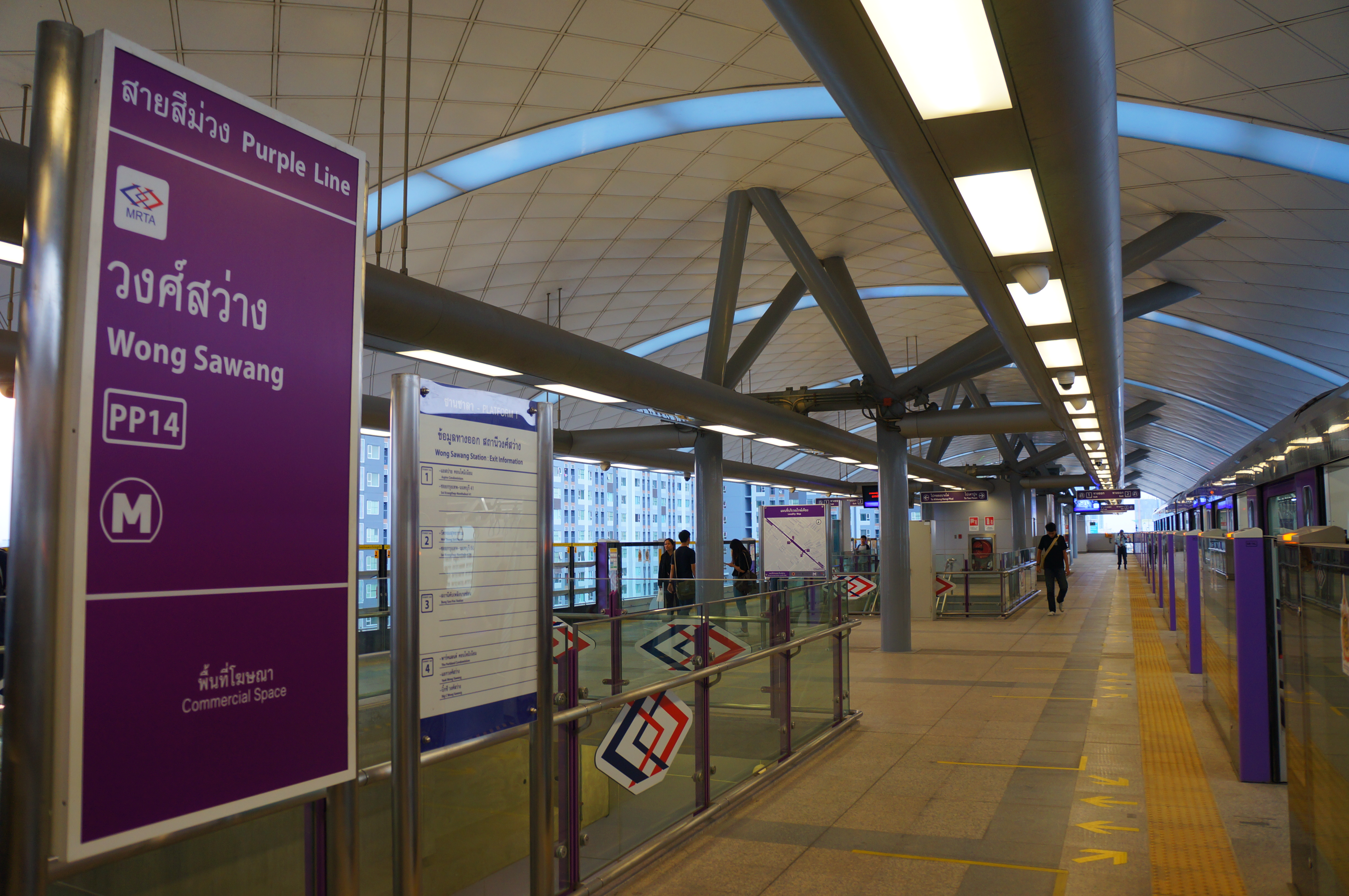
- Platform

General information
- Location: Bang Sue, Bangkok, Thailand
- Coordinates: 13°49′47.4″N 100°31′35.8″E
- System: | MRT
- Owner: Mass Rapid Transit Authority of Thailand
- Operator: Bangkok Expressway and Metro Public Company Limited
- Line: Purple Line
- Platforms: 2 (1 island platform)
- Tracks: 2
- Connections: Bus, Taxi

Construction
- Structure type: Elevated
- Parking: Not available
- Cycle facilities: Available
- Accessible: yes

Other information
- Station code: PP14

History
- Opened: 6 August 2016; 10 years ago

Passengers
- 2021: 866,937

Services
Preceding station	Metropolitan Rapid Transit	Following station
Yaek Tiwanon towards Khlong Bang Phai	Purple Line	Bang Son towards Tao Poon
Location

Wong Sawang station (Thai: สถานีวงศ์สว่าง, pronounced [sā.tʰǎː.nīː wōŋ sā.wàːŋ]) is a Bangkok MRT station on the Purple Line. The station opened on 6 August 2016 and is located on Bangkok-Nonthaburi road, near its intersection with Wong Sawang Road in Bangkok. The station has four entrances. It is the northernmost station on the Purple Line to be within Bangkok's boundary. (The next station to the north of this station is located in Nonthaburi Province).
