= Talat Khwan, Nonthaburi =

Talat Khwan Subdistrict ตำบลตลาดขวัญ
- Subdistrict
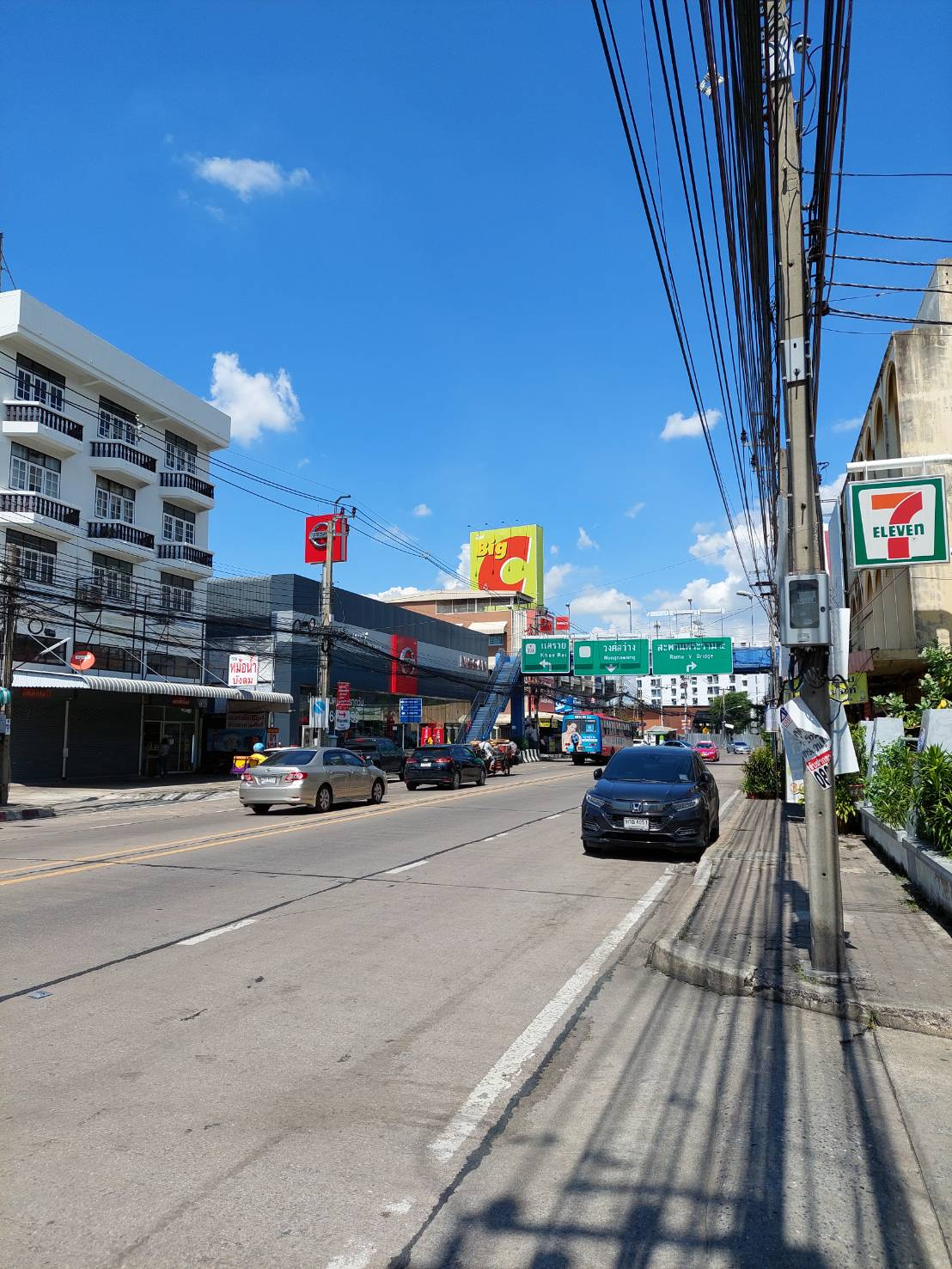
- Pracha Rat Road in the subdistrict
- Interactive map of Talat Khwan Subdistrict
- Country: Thailand
- Province: Nonthaburi
- District: Mueang Nonthaburi

Area
  - Total: 8.2 km^{2} (3.2 sq mi)

Population (2020)
  - Total: 47,695
  - Density: 5,816.46/km^{2} (15,064.6/sq mi)
- Time zone: UTC+7 (ICT)
- Postal code: 11000
- TIS 1099: 120102

Talat Khwan (Thai: ตลาดขวัญ, pronounced [tā.làːt kʰwǎn]) is one of the ten subdistricts (tambon) of Mueang Nonthaburi District, in Nonthaburi Province, Thailand. The subdistrict is bounded by (clockwise from north) Bang Kraso, Bang Khen and Suan Yai subdistricts. The whole area of the subdistrict is covered by Nonthaburi City Municipality (เทศบาลนครนนทบุรี). In 2020 it had a total population of 47,695 people.
