= Phon Sangsingkeo =

Thai medical doctor (1907–1980)

- Born: 24 April 1907; Khemarat, Ubon Ratchathani, Siam
- Died: 1980; Bangkok, Thailand
- Education: Chulalongkorn University
- Known for: mental health studies
- Awards: Ramon Magsaysay Award
- Scientific career
- Fields: Psychiatry
- Workplaces: World Federation for Mental Health, Somdet Chao Phraya Hospital

Phon Sangsingkeo (or Fon Saengsingkaew, Thai: ฝน แสงสิงแก้ว) (April 24, 1907–1980) was a Thai medical doctor whose studies on factors that contribute to the mental well-being of a person earned him the Ramon Magsaysay Award for Government Service in 1966. His holistic approach led him to integrate how the rapid advancement of technology and cultural changes affect mental health, resulting in a more humane treatment of mental patients thus putting the dictum "treat the person as a person" in practice. For this, he is known as the father of modern psychiatry in Thailand.

== Personal life ==
Phon is the son of Sang Panich, a businessman who came from a noble family. Sang Panich was bestowed the title khun by King Vajiravudh for his honesty and hard work. The sixth of eleven children, young Phon was a devoted student who dreamed to be a doctor. He was sent to live in a temple under the care of a priest in preparation for his secondary schooling at Suankularb College. He finished medicine in Chulalongkorn University's School of Medicine in Bangkok at the age of 22.

He married Pravas Rasanonda in 1935, the same year he became assistant director to Dr. Luang. The marriage brought forth three sons.

== Career ==
Phon joined the Department of Health in 1929. From 1930 to 1934, he was provincial medical officer at Sakolnakorn where he developed in interest in providing comfort and easing the miseries of the mentally ill. In 1935, he became assistant director of the mental hospital in Thonburi under Dr. Luang Vichien Patayakorn who sent the young man to study and observe medical practices in Japan, the Philippines, and Indonesia. At that time, straitjackets were used to subdue mental patients but Phon and his colleagues pushed for reforms, banking instead on gentleness and love.

As more mental hospitals were established and as the number of mental patients increased, Phon's career advanced when the government sent him to train at the University of Colorado, Denver Psychopathic Hospital and at the Johns Hopkins University in Baltimore. Upon his return he was assigned as chief of a division on welfare at the Ministry of Interior, establishing an orphanage school which promote mental hygiene. He stayed on with the job even during World War II when many of contemporaries left the country in search of greener pastures.

In 1942, he succeeded Dr. Luang to become the director of the Mental Hospital (Rong Phayaban Khon Sia Sati in Thai) in Thonburi. At the same time, he was appointed director of a new division in the Department of Health responsible for mental institutions, a position he would hold until 1954. When the war ended, he helped build parks within facilities and gave "happy names" to buildings. This practice of providing green spaces for patients still continue until the present day. Instead of using the donations to renovate the old director's house where he lived, he focused on upgrading facilities for the benefit of patients and hospital staff. He also became instrumental in sending young doctors and nurses abroad to study, with the hope that they will continue his work in the future.

At an annual meeting of the World Federation for Mental Health in 1962, he talked about the problems posed by social and cultural changes to mental health today and is quoted to have remarked that:

"Wherever a population grows much faster than its economy--- and this is frequently the case in the present-day world-- starvation, sickness, poverty and mental health are specters on the horizon."
