= Bang Kraso =

Bang Kraso Subdistrict ตำบลบางกระสอ
- Subdistrict
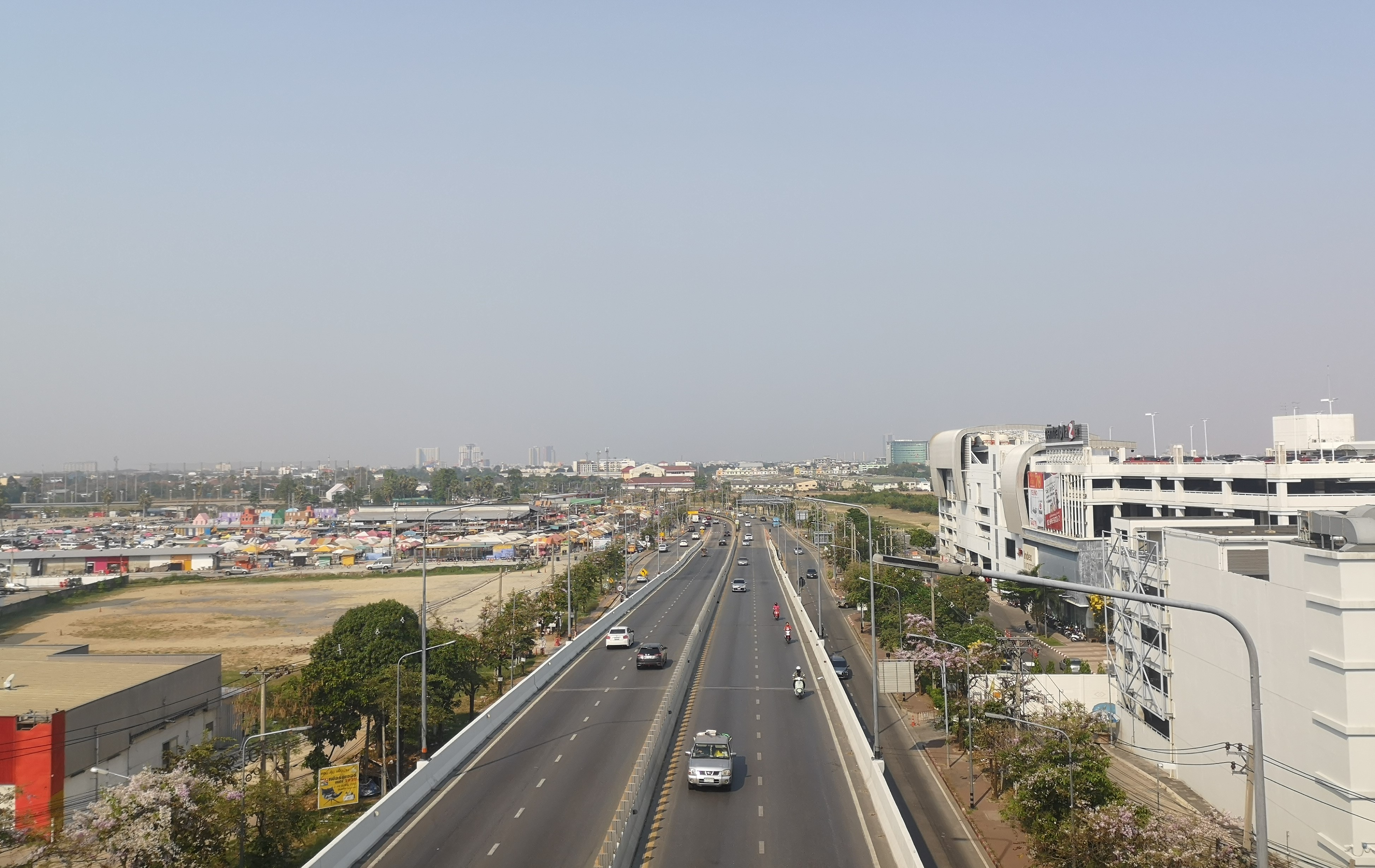
- Liang Mueang Nonthaburi Road in the subdistrict
- Country: Thailand
- Province: Nonthaburi
- District: Mueang Nonthaburi

Area
  - Total: 11.2 km^{2} (4.3 sq mi)

Population (2020)
  - Total: 57,198
  - Density: 5,106.96/km^{2} (13,227.0/sq mi)
- Time zone: UTC+7 (ICT)
- Postal code: 11000
- TIS 1099: 120104

Bang Kraso (Thai: บางกระสอ, pronounced [bāːŋ krā.sɔ̌ː]) is one of the ten subdistricts (tambon) of Mueang Nonthaburi District, in Nonthaburi Province, Thailand. The subdistrict is bounded by (clockwise from north) Tha Sai, Bang Khen, Talat Khwan, Suan Yai, and across the Chao Phraya River, Sai Ma and Tha It subdistricts. The whole area of the subdistrict is covered by Nonthaburi City Municipality (เทศบาลนครนนทบุรี). In 2020, it had a total population of 57,198 people.
