= Somdet Chaopraya Institute of Psychiatry =

Somdet Chaopraya Institute of Psychiatry สถาบันจิตเวชศาสตร์สมเด็จเจ้าพระยา
- Department of Mental Health, MOPH

Geography
- Location: Khlong San Subdistrict, Khlong San District, Bangkok, Thailand, Thailand
- Coordinates: 13.730455°N 100.504401°E

Organisation
- Type: Specialist

Services
- Beds: 500
- Speciality: Psychiatry

History
- Former names: Hospital for the Mentally Ill; Thon Buri Psychosis Hospital
- Founded: 1 November 1889

Links
- Website: www.somdet.go.th/public/Eng/main.php
- Lists: Hospitals in Thailand

Somdet Chaopraya Institute of Psychiatry (also known as Somdet Chao Phraya Hospital) is a psychiatric hospital in Khlong San District of Bangkok, Thailand. Established as a mental asylum, the original building was designed by a British architect and supervised by the British physician Dr. Morden Carthew. As the first psychiatric hospital and the second oldest hospital in Thailand, the hospital became well known for being the pioneer in the country for the humane treatment of mentally ill patients.

== History ==
Founded at the behest of King Chulalongkorn in 1889, the hospital initially occupied a five rai plot of land on one side of the Chao Phraya River. A decade later, it transferred to its current 44 rai campus. The institution's original name was the "Hospital for the Mentally Ill" (Rong Phayaban Khon Sia Sati). It was changed to the "Thon Buri Psychosis Hospital" (Rong Phayaban Rok Jit Thon Buri). When Phon Sangsingkeo assumed directorship of the Mental Hospital, he changed its name to "Somdet Chao Phraya Hospital" in 1954 to remove the stigma associated with the hospital's former name. Its new name was the name of Somdetchaopraya Road where the institute is found. In 1955, the hospital started to offer training programs in order to increase expertise in the field of psychiatry and mental health. Shortly after, the Psychiatric Association of Thailand was founded.

A mental hygiene clinic was opened in Somdet Chao Phraya Hospital following the successful training of a team of experts who studied mental hygiene, child psychiatry, clinical psychology, and psychiatric social work. This was expanded further to provide outpatient mental services. When the Child Mental Health Center was established, the hospital begun to provide outpatient mental services, cut short in 1970 due to a staff shortage.

The hospital was upgraded to the status of a division following a royal decree in 1974 to restructure the Department of Medical Services. In 2002, the hospital was renamed the "Somdet Chaopraya Institute of Psychiatry".

The institute's campus is home to trees more than a century old. Hospital director Dr. Sinngern Suksompong believes that greenery helps calm mental patients. Management refuses to cut trees for expansion and invites VIPs to plant trees on special occasions.

== See also ==
- Srithanya Hospital
