= Bamrasnaradura Infectious Diseases Institute =

Specialised hospital in Thailand

Bamrasnaradura Infectious Diseases Institute สถาบันบำราศนราดูร
- Department of Disease Control, MOPH
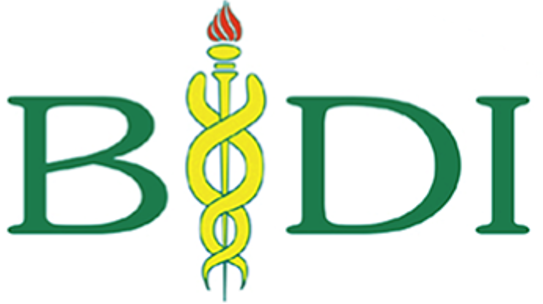

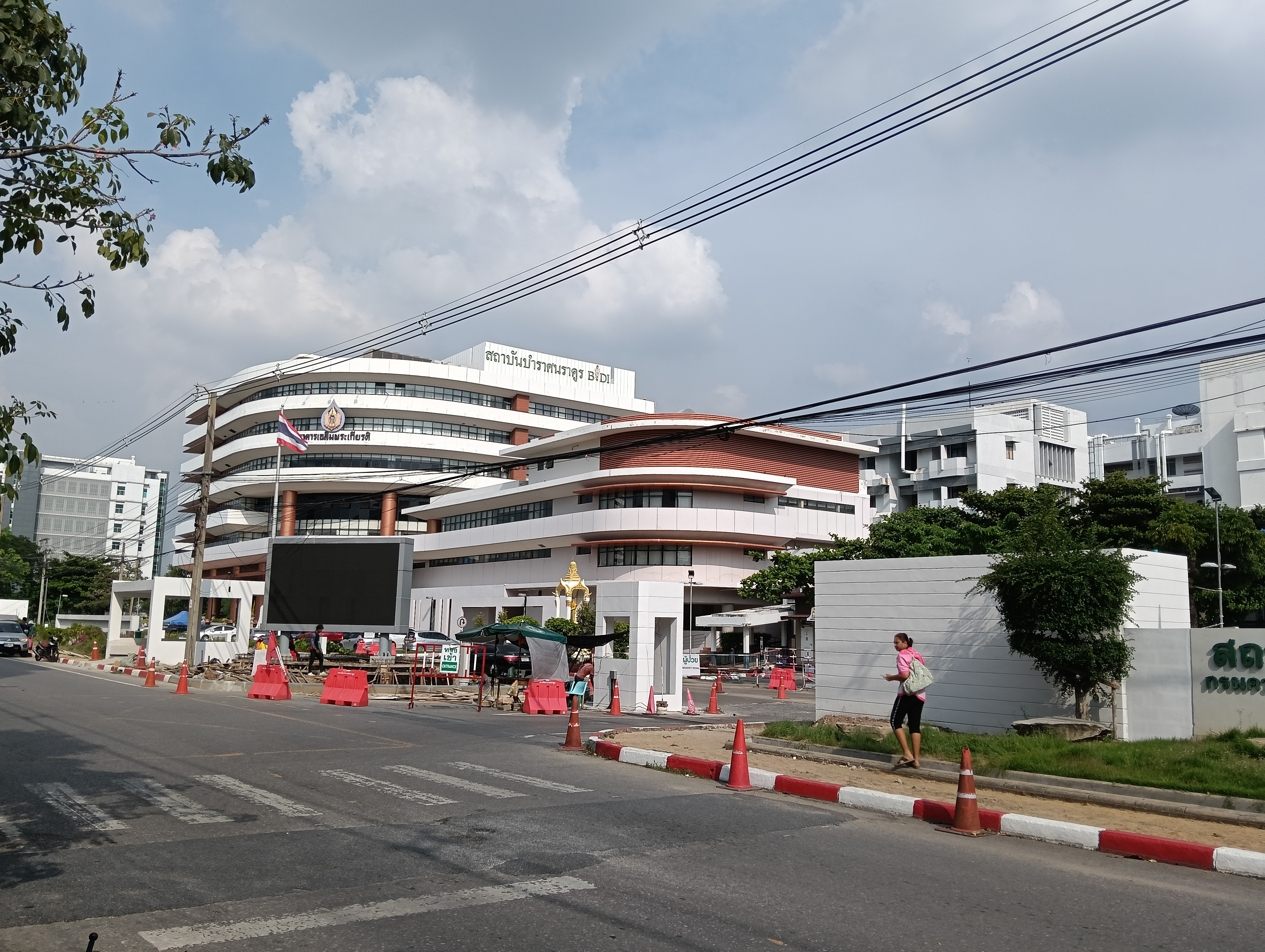

Geography
- Location: 38 Tiwanon Road, Talat Khwan Subdistrict, Mueang Nonthaburi, Nonthaburi Province 11000, Thailand
- Coordinates: 13°51′14″N 100°31′22″E

Services
- Beds: 300

History
- Former name: Bamrasnaradura Hospital
- Founded: 2 November 1960; 65 years ago, as Bamrasnaradura Hospital

Links
- Website: bamras.ddc.moph.go.th

Bamrasnaradura Infectious Diseases Institute (Thai: สถาบันบำราศนราดูร; RTGS: bamrat naradun) is a specialised hospital for patients infected with highly contagious diseases and used to control the outbreak of the diseases. It was found in 1960 as Bamrasnaradura Hospital. The hospital is currently a division of Department of Disease Control, Ministry of Public Health and located in Nonthaburi Province, Thailand within the headquarters of the ministry itself.

== History ==
Bamrasnaradura Hospital was founded under the premiership of Field Marshal Sarit Thanarat, as part of his policy to establish a new specialised hospital for infectious diseases after the outbreak of Cholera in Thailand during 1958-1959 which killed 2,372 people. The hospital opened on 2 November 1960. It replaced the old Phaya Thai National Infectious Diseases Hospital in Dusit District which was dilapidated and located too close to the community area. The field marshal named the hospital after Phra Bamrasnaradura, the royal title of Dr. Long Vejjajiva who the minister of public health at the time, in commemoration of his effective control over the cholera outbreak. On 2 October 2002, the hospital was getting restructured. It was renamed Bamrasnaradura Infectious Diseases Institute and merged into a division of Department of Disease Control of Ministry of Public Health.

Bamrasnaradura Infectious Diseases Institute has been used as a major isolation facility of the country for many lethal infectious diseases in the past and still is used for that purpose today. Examples include SARS, MERS, Ebola and currently COVID-19

== See also ==
- Health in Thailand
- Hospitals in Thailand
- List of hospitals in Thailand
