= Wong Sawang =

Coordinates: 13.828303°N 100.528464°E

Wong Sawang วงศ์สว่าง
- Khwaeng
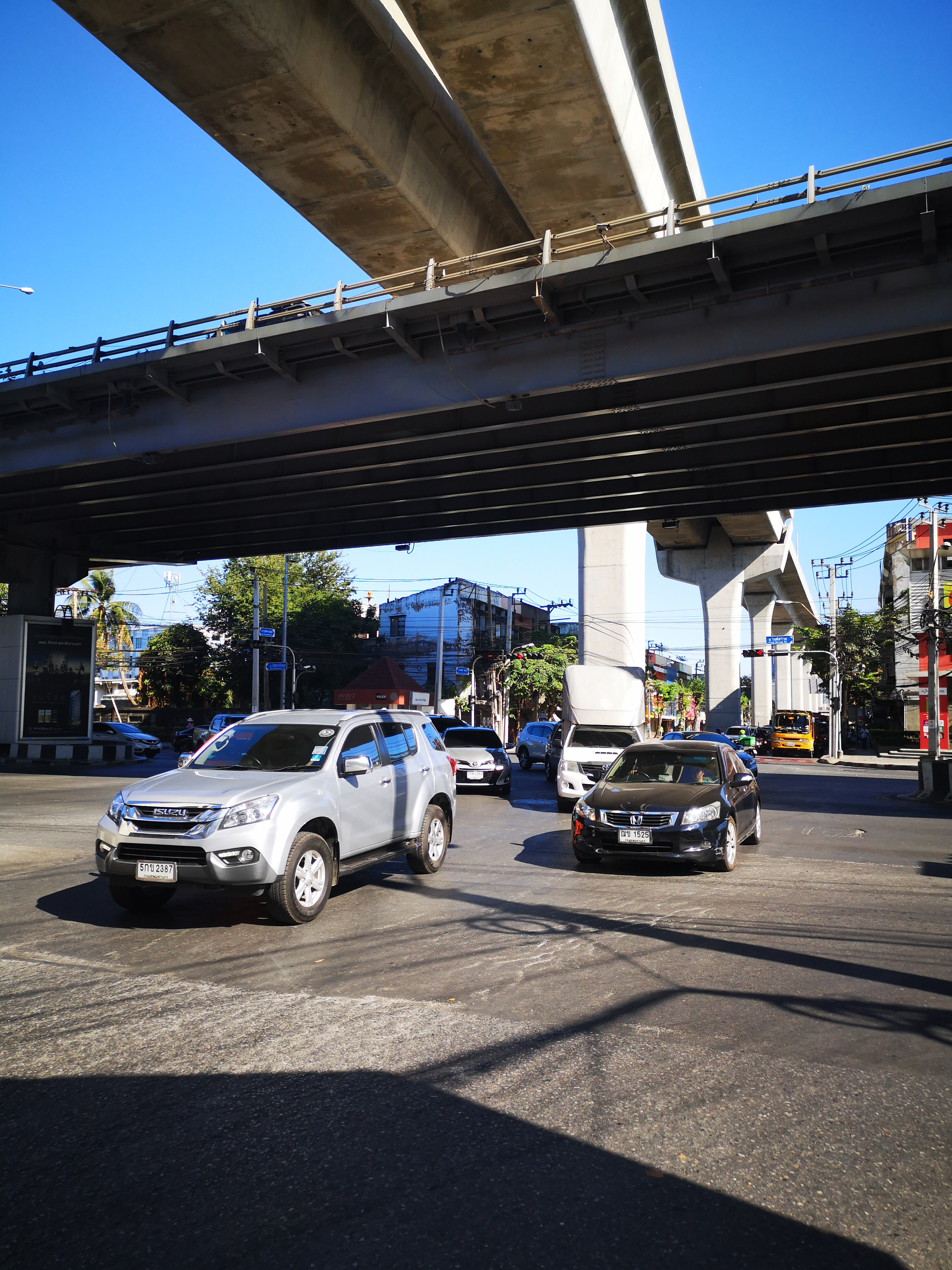
- Wong Sawang Intersection

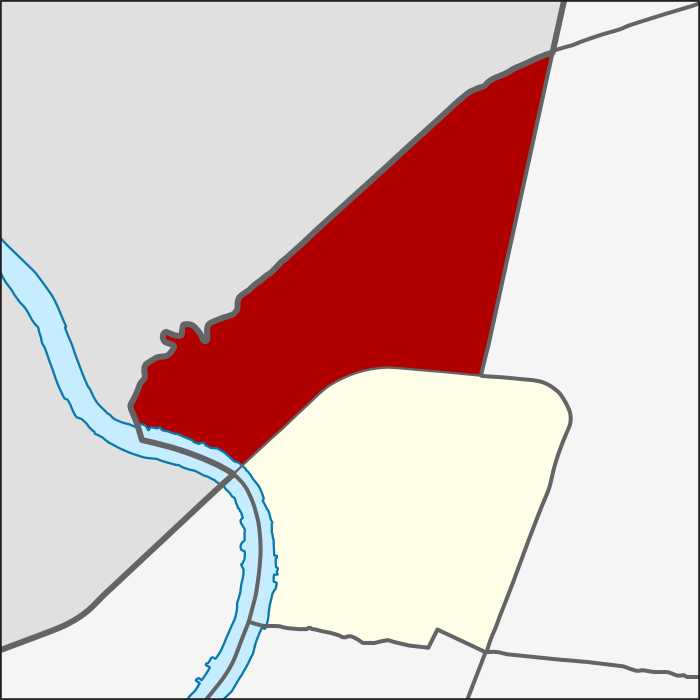
- Location in Bang Sue District
- Country: Thailand
- Province: Bangkok
- Khet: Bang Sue

Area
  - Total: 5.783 km^{2} (2.233 sq mi)

Population (2020)
  - Total: 43,005
- Time zone: UTC+7 (ICT)
- Postal code: 10800
- TIS 1099: 102902

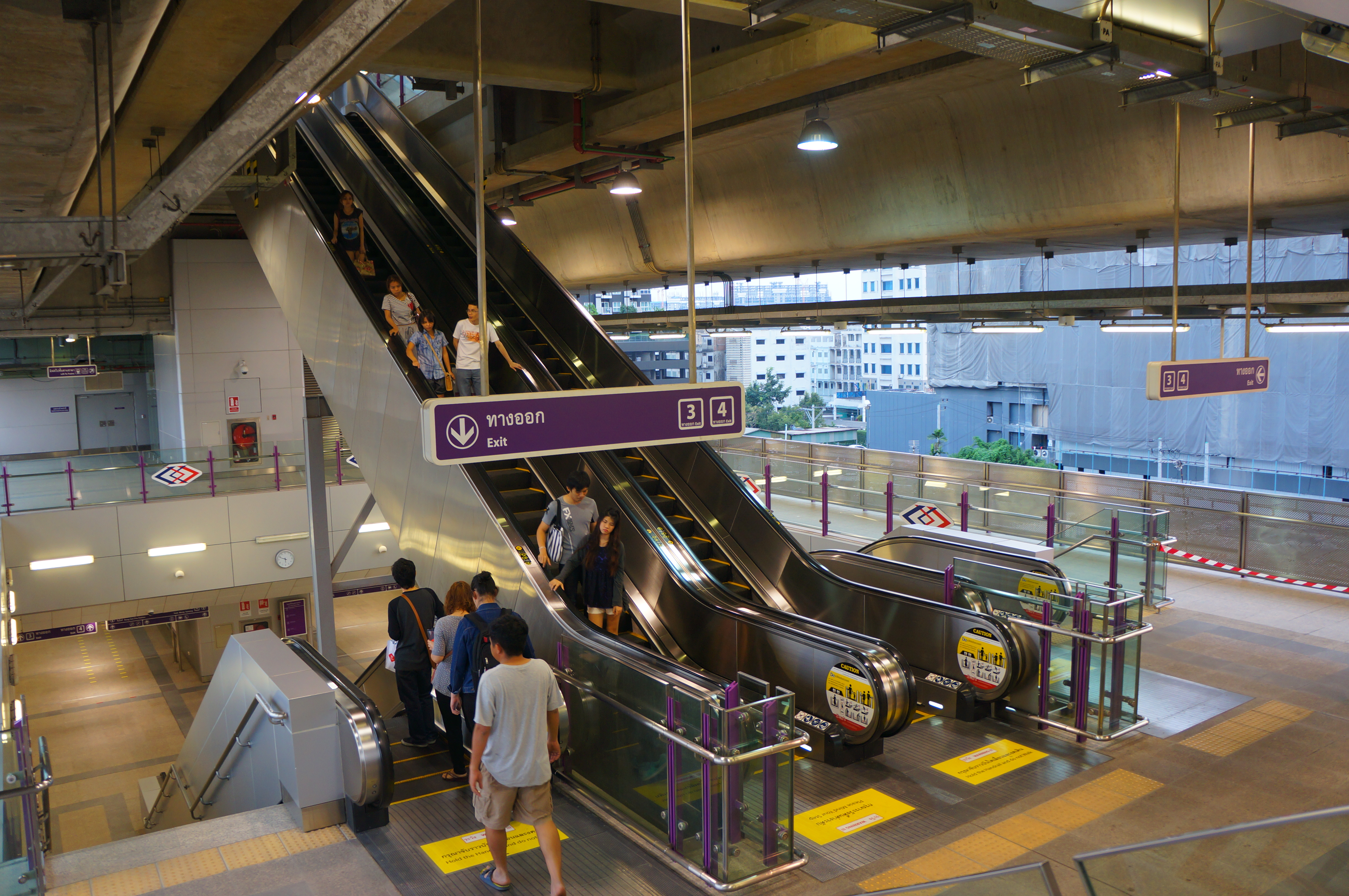
Wong Sawang Station interior

Wong Sawang (Thai: วงศ์สว่าง, pronounced [wōŋ sā.wàːŋ]) is a khwaeng (subdistrict) of two subdistricts of Bang Sue District, Bangkok, apart from Bang Sue Subdistrict. It is also the name of the surrounding area.

== History ==
The name "Wong Sawang" is derived from a road in same name that passes through the area. It is assumed that the name comes from the surname of the chief construction engineer. Wong Sawang is a road that is now considered part of Ratchadaphisek Road (Inner Ring Road). It is connected to an extension of Ratchadaphisek Road, therefore, the current Wong Sawang Road remains only between Rama VII Bridge to Wong Sawang Intersection, where it intersects with Bangkok-Nonthaburi and Ratchadaphisek Roads.

Wong Sawang was raised as a subdistrict in 2009.

== Geography ==
Wong Sawang can be considered as an area in the north of the district.

Neighbouring subdistricts are (from the north clockwise): Bang Khen in Mueang Nonthaburi of Nonthaburi Province (Khlong Bang Khen is a borderline), Lat Yao and Chatuchak of Chatuchak District (Khlong Prapa and Southern Railway Line are the borderlines), Bang Sue in its district (Southern Railway Line is a borderline), Bang Kruai in Bang Kruai of Nonthaburi Province (Chao Phraya River is a borderline).

== Administration ==
Wong Sawang consists of 26 communities.

== Transportation ==
Wong Sawang is served by MRT Purple Line's Wong Sawang Station (PP14), where the station is located above Wong Sawang Intersection.
