= Nonthaburi =

City in Thailand

Nonthaburi นนทบุรี
- City Municipality
- City of Nonthaburi เทศบาลนครนนทบุรี
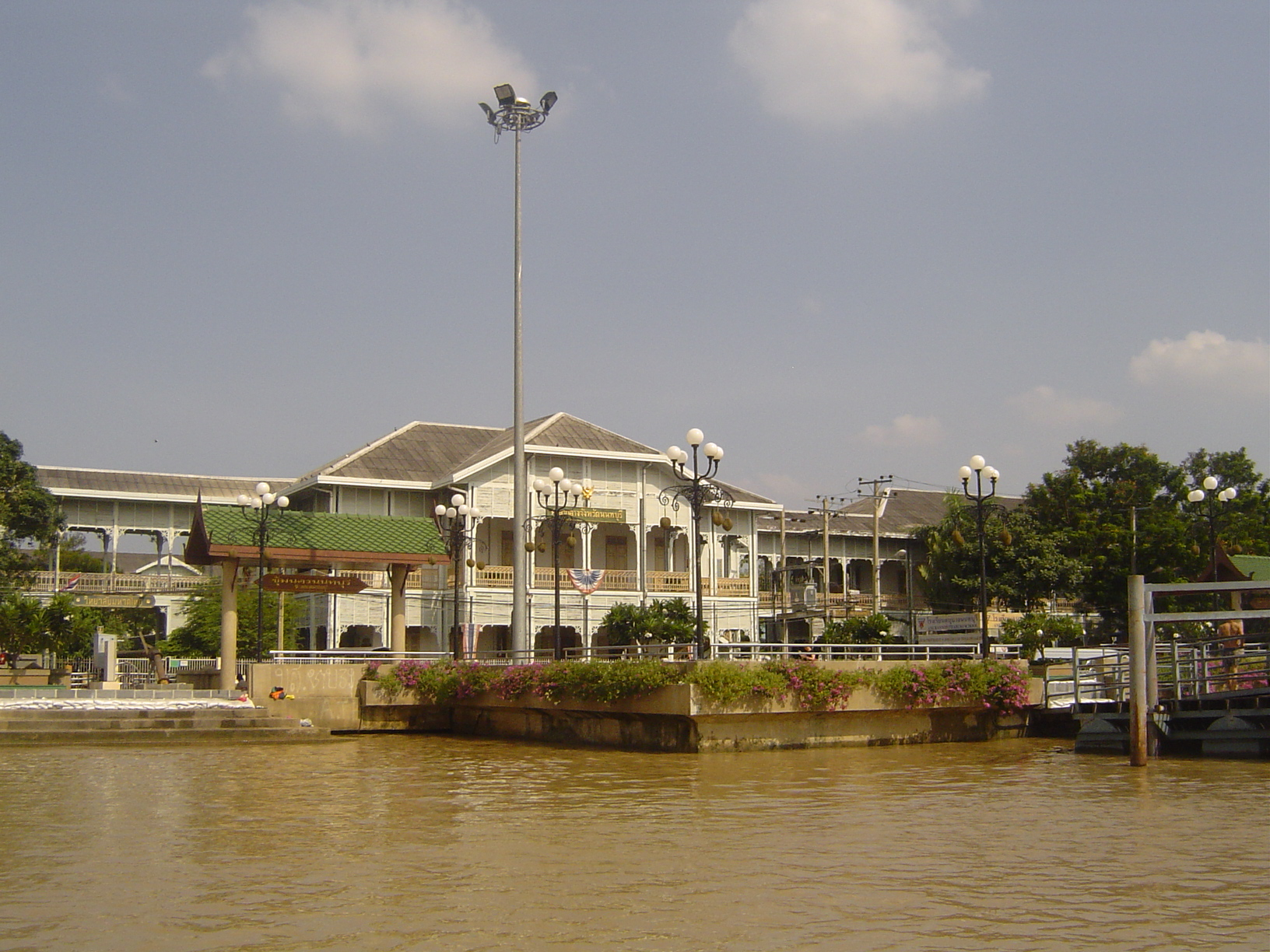
- Nonthaburi Museum, formerly Nonthaburi Provincial Hall

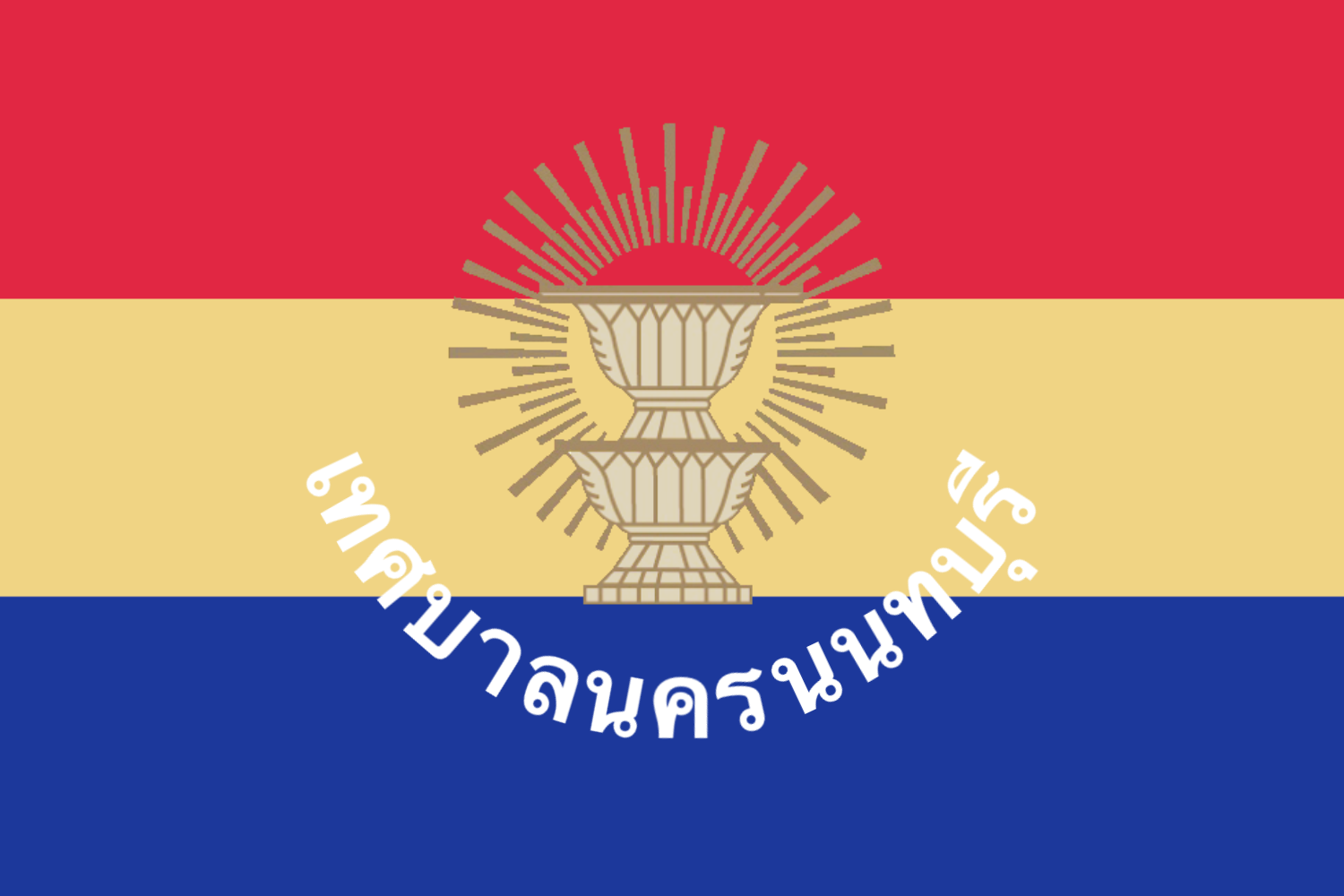
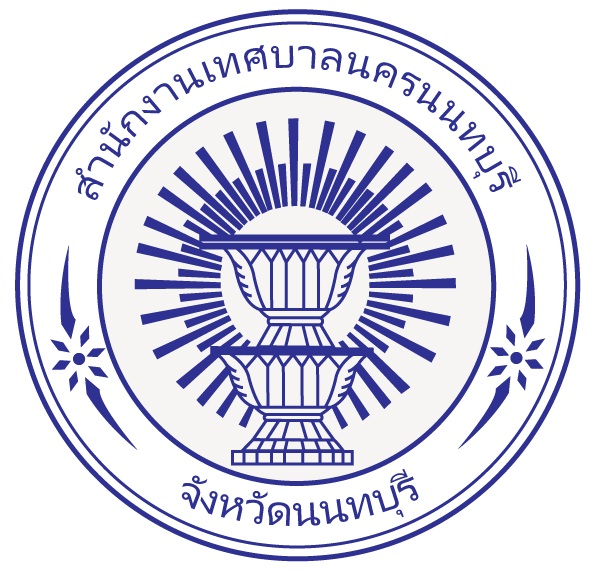
- Flag Seal

- Location in the Bangkok Metropolitan Region Location in Thailand
- Coordinates: 13°51′03″N 100°31′20″E
- Country: Thailand
- Province: Nonthaburi
- District: Mueang Nonthaburi
- Incorporated (town): 14 February 1936
- Incorporated (city): 24 September 1995

Government
  - Type: City Municipality
  - Mayor: Somnuk Thanadechakul

Area
  - Total: 38.90 km^{2} (15.02 sq mi)
  - Rank: 12th

Population (2019)
  - Total: 254,375 (registered residents)
  - Rank: 2nd in Thailand
  - Density: 6,539/km^{2} (16,940/sq mi)
- Time zone: UTC+07:00 (ICT)
- Postal code: 11000
- Calling code: 02
- Website: nakornnont.go.th

Nonthaburi (Thai: นนทบุรี, pronounced [nōn.tʰá(ʔ).bù.rīː]) is the capital city of the district and province of the same name, and the second largest city in Thailand.

On 15 February 1936, Nonthaburi town municipality (thesaban mueang) was established, which only covered Suan Yai subdistrict (tambon), just 2.5 km^{2} (0.97 sq mi). On 25 September 1995, Nonthaburi was upgraded to city municipality (thesaban nakhon) by enlargement of the city with four more subdistricts, Talat Khwan (8.2 km^{2} [3.2 sq mi]), Bang Khen (9.0 km^{2} [3.5 sq mi]), Bang Kraso (11.2 km^{2} [4.3 sq mi]) and Tha Sai (8.0 km^{2} [3.1 sq mi]), covering a total of 38.9 km^{2} (15.0 sq mi). As of 31 December 2019, it has a registered population of 254,375, making it the most populous city municipality in Thailand (excluding Bangkok).

There are 93 communities (chumchon), although not directly chosen by the local citizens, which provides advice and recommendations to local administrative organizations. Due to its proximity to Bangkok, the city is considered a suburb of Bangkok, a part of the Bangkok Metropolitan Region, or Greater Bangkok.

Nonthaburi is served by public transport systems including the Bangkok Mass Transit Authority bus system, the Chao Phraya Express Boat, and the MRT Purple Line and MRT Pink Line, inaugurated in 2016 and 2024 respectively.

Nonthaburi is known for its temple and market such as Wat Chaloem Phra Kiat, Wat Chomphuwek, Wat Chotikaram, Wat Khema Phirataram, Wat Prasat, Wat Sangkhathan and so on.

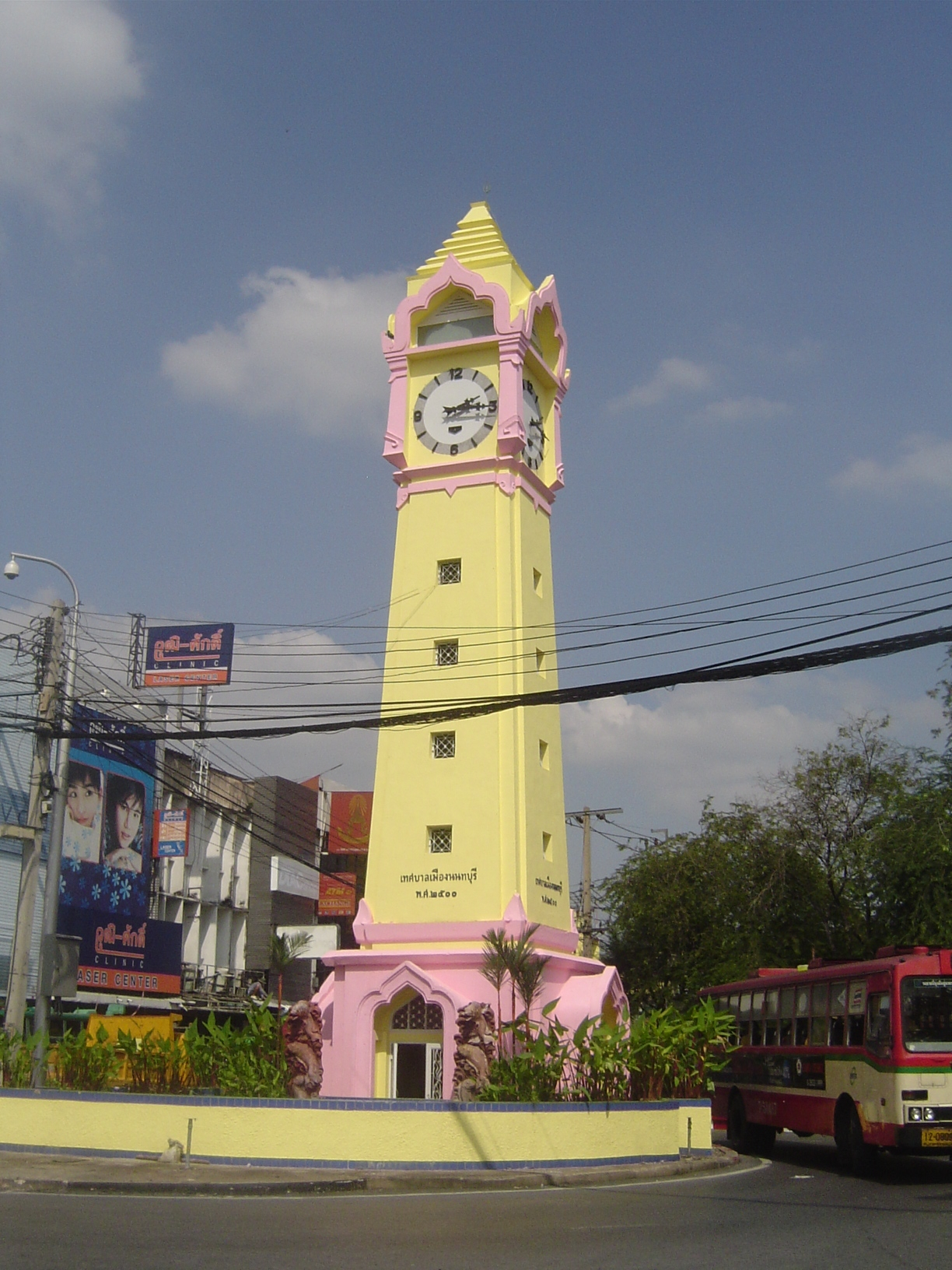
Clocktower at Nonthaburi Pier
