= Mueang Nonthaburi district =

District in Nonthaburi, Thailand

Mueang Nonthaburi เมืองนนทบุรี
- District
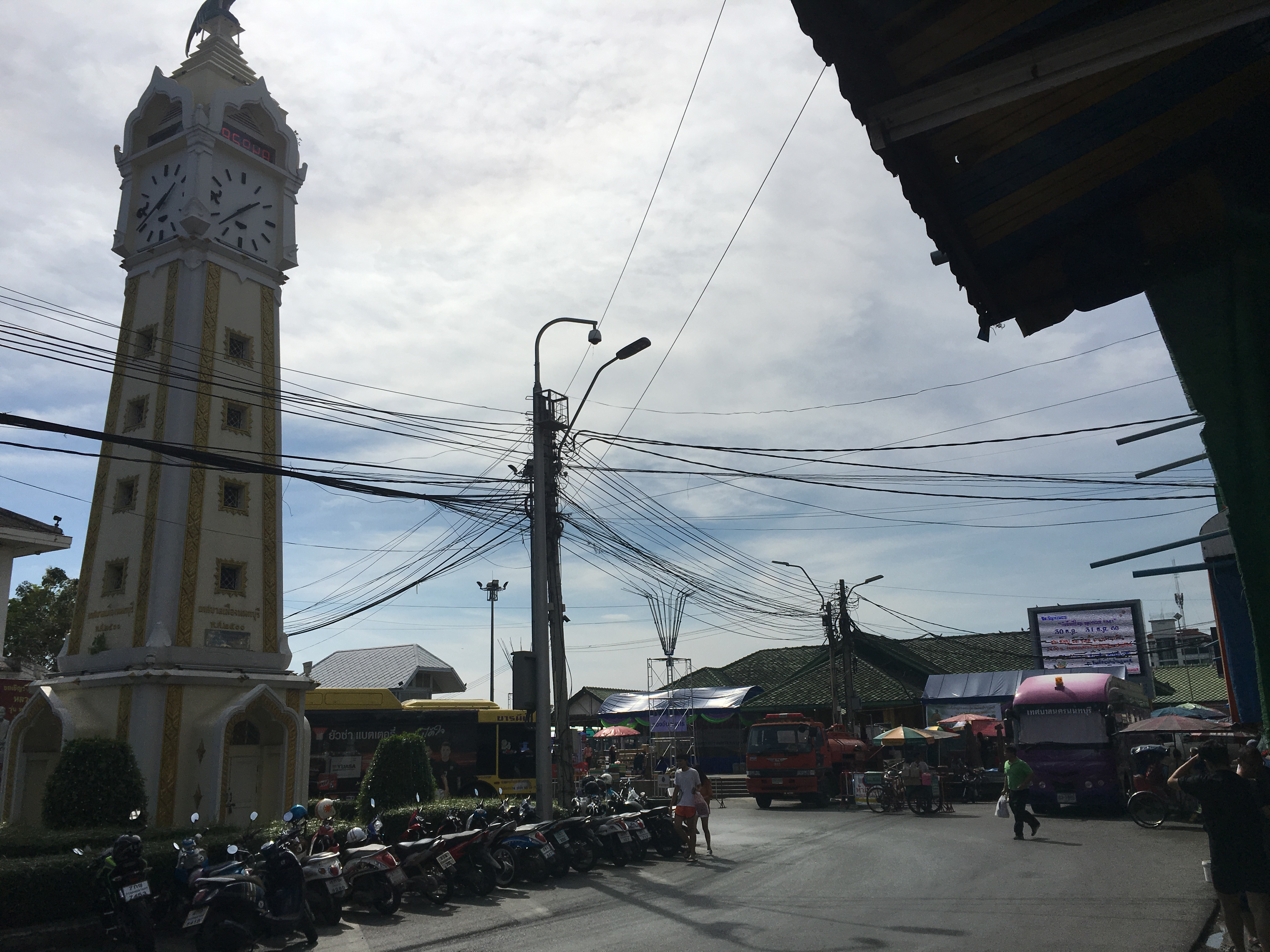
- Nonthaburi Clock Tower, a landmark of the district near Nonthaburi Pier and The Old Nonthaburi Provincial Hall
- Interactive map of Mueang Nonthaburi
- Country: Thailand
- Province: Nonthaburi
- Seat: Bang Kraso
- Subdistricts: 10
- Mubans: 22 (administrative)

Area
  - Total: 77.0 km^{2} (29.7 sq mi)

Population (2025)
  - Total: 356,701
  - Density: 4,632/km^{2} (12,000/sq mi)
- Time zone: UTC+7
- Postal code: 11000
- Calling code: 02
- ISO 3166 code: TH-1201

Mueang Nonthaburi (Thai: เมืองนนทบุรี, RTGS: Mueang Nonthaburi, pronounced [mɯ̄aŋ nōn.tʰá(ʔ).bū.rīː]) is the capital district (amphoe mueang) of Nonthaburi province in Thailand. The city of Nonthaburi has 239,041 inhabitants, while the whole district has 356,701.

== History ==
The district was originally named "Talat Khwan". Simon de la Loubère, who was a French envoy extraordinary to the King of Ayutthaya, wrote in his book that Talat Khwan (Talacoan) was an important place on the Chao Phraya River. It is unknown what year it was established. In 1917, the provincial administration of Nonthaburi was moved into the district, and thus the district was renamed Mueang Nonthaburi. From 1 January 1943 to 9 May 1946 Nonthaburi was abolished and split between Thonburi and Phra Nakhon Provinces. Thus the district, which was then in Phra Nakhon Province, was renamed "Nonthaburi". After the recreation of the province, it changed back to "Mueang Nonthaburi".

== Religion ==
Most people in Nonthaburi district are Buddhist. There are total 52 Theravada Buddhist temples in the district, of which 50 Maha Nikai and 2 Dhammayut temples.
Further there are 18 Christian churches and 4 Mosques in the district.

== Administrative divisions ==
District location in Nonthaburi province

Map of district with six municipalities

=== Provincial government ===
The district is divided into 10 subdistricts (tambons), which are further subdivided into 22 villages (mubans).

	Subdistricts	People	Villages
1	Suan Yai	33,214	-
2	Talat Khwan	44,892	-
3	Bang Khen	40,376	-
4	Bang Kraso	56,282	-
5	Tha Sai	64,277	-
6	Bang Phai	13,364	5
7	Bang Si Mueang	24,561	5
8	Bang Krang	33,824	10
9	Sai Ma	24,674	6
10	Bang Rak Noi	21,237	6
	Total	356,701	22

=== Local government ===
The city (thesaban nakhon) of Nonthaburi covers tambons Suan Yai, Talat Khwan, Bang Khen, Bang Kraso, and Tha Sai. There are five town municipalities (thesaban mueang): Bang Si Mueang, which covers tambon Bang Si Mueang and parts of tambon Bang Krang; and Bang Krang which covers the remaining parts of tambon Bang Krang; Sai Ma, Bang Rak Noi and Bang Phai cover the whole same-named tambons.

	City municipality	People
1	Nonthaburi	239,041

	Town municipalities	People	3	Sai Ma	24,674
1	Bang Si Mueang	33,074	4	Bang Rak Noi	21,237
2	Bang Krang	25,311	5	Bang Phai	13,364

== Education ==
Educational institutions from primary to high education in the district is as follows:

=== High education ===
- Rajamangala University of Technology Suvarnabhumi.

=== Vocational education ===
- Siam Business Administration Technological College (SBAC).

=== Secondary education ===
- Total 10 upper secondary schools with 7,791 students.
- Total 6 lower secondary schools with 9,913 students.

=== Primary education ===
- Total 24 primary schools with 11,767 pupils.

== Health ==
=== Government hospitals ===
There are five government hospitals in Mueang Nonthaburi district.

- One regional hospital: Phra Nang Klao Hospital with 657 beds.
- One community hospital: Nonthaburi Medical Center with 30 beds.

Furthermore, there are three specialized hospitals in the district.

- Bamrasnaradura Infectious Diseases Institute with 650 beds.
- Central Chest Institute of Thailand with 400 beds.
- Sirindhorn National Medical Rehabilitation Centre with 48 beds.

=== Private hospitals ===
There are five private hospitals in Mueang Nonthaburi district:

- Asia Cosmetic Hospital with 6 beds
- Lelux Hospital with 30 beds
- Mind Med with 18 beds
- Nonthavej Hospital with 208 beds
- Rattanathibet Medical Center with 10 beds

=== Health promoting hospitals ===
There are total 16 health-promoting hospitals in Mueang Nonthaburi district.

=== Clinics ===
Around 334 clinics are in Mueang Nonthaburi district.

== Economy ==
The Thai Department of Corrections has its headquarters in Suan Yai in this district.

== Environment ==
Mueang Nonthaburi as well as neighbouring Bang Kruai and Bang Yai is the last natural habitat of the Alexandrine parakeet and red-breasted parakeet, a medium-sized parrot in Bangkok Metropolitan Region. They live in groups on large trees in some local temples, such as Wat Suan Yai, Wat Utthayan, Wat Ampawan, Wat Chaloem Phra Kiat Worawihan.
