= Phra Nang Klao Bridge MRT station =

Monorail station in Thailand

สะพานพระนั่งเกล้า PP08 Phra Nang Klao Bridge
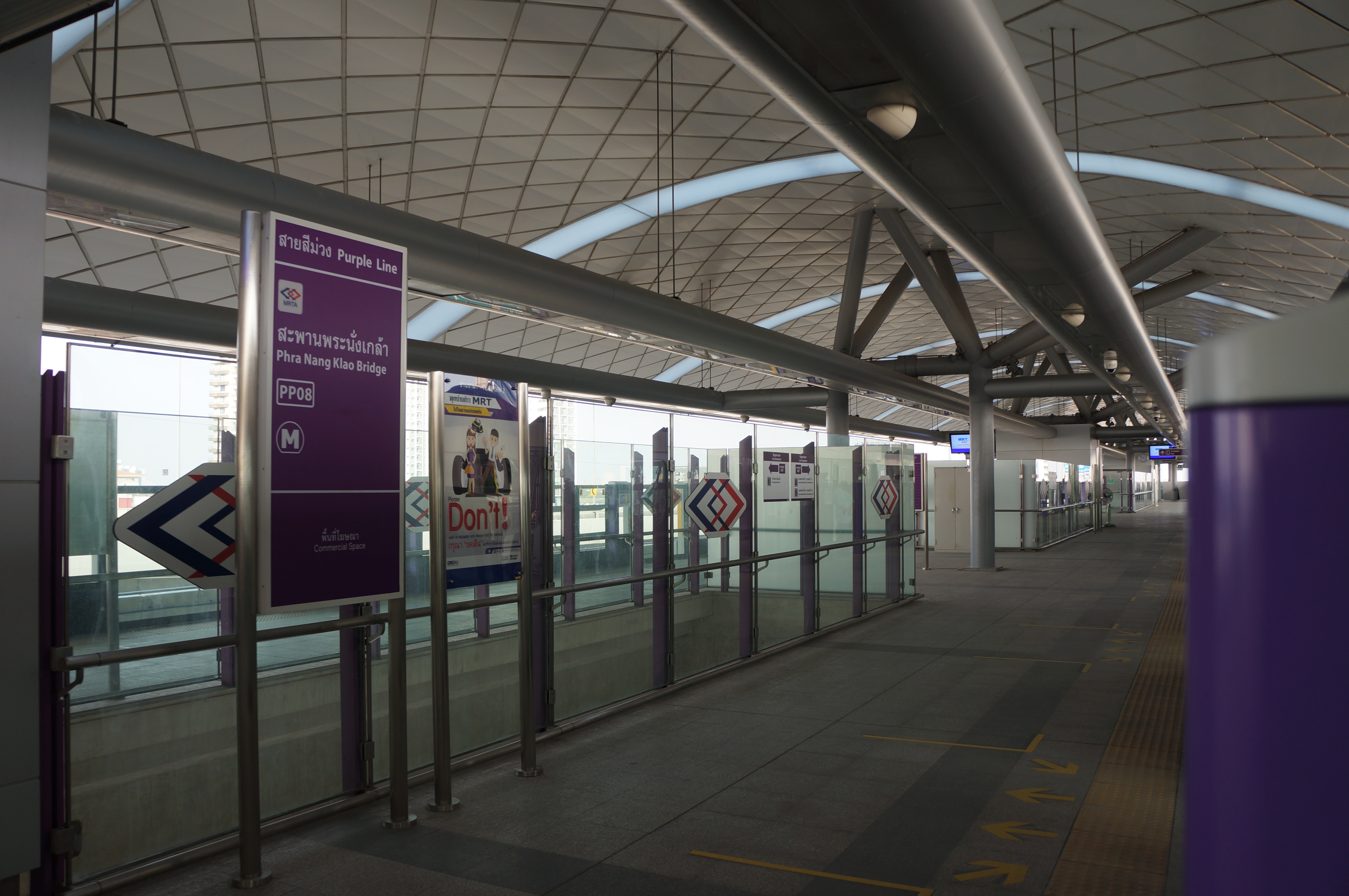
- Platform

General information
- Location: Bang Kraso, Mueang Nonthaburi, Nonthaburi, Thailand
- Coordinates: 13°52′13.0″N 100°28′49.1″E
- System: | MRT
- Owner: Mass Rapid Transit Authority of Thailand
- Operator: Bangkok Expressway and Metro Public Company Limited
- Line: Purple Line
- Platforms: 2 (1 island platform)
- Tracks: 2
- Connections: Bus, Taxi, Chao Phraya Express Boat

Construction
- Structure type: Elevated
- Parking: Not available
- Cycle facilities: Available
- Accessible: yes

Other information
- Station code: PP08

History
- Opened: 6 August 2016; 10 years ago

Passengers
- 2021: 553,829

Services
Preceding station	Metropolitan Rapid Transit	Following station
Sai Ma towards Khlong Bang Phai	Purple Line	Yaek Nonthaburi 1 towards Tao Poon
Location

Phra Nang Klao Bridge station (Thai: สถานีสะพานพระนั่งเกล้า, RTGS: Sathani Saphan Phra Nang Klao) is a Bangkok MRT station on the Purple Line. The station opened on 6 August 2016 and is located on Rattanathibet road on the eastern end of Phra Nang Klao Bridge crossing the Chao Phraya River in Nonthaburi Province. The station has three entrances.
