= Bang Rak Noi Tha It MRT station =

Bangkok MRT station on the Purple Line

บางรักน้อยท่าอิฐ PP06 Bang Rak Noi Tha It
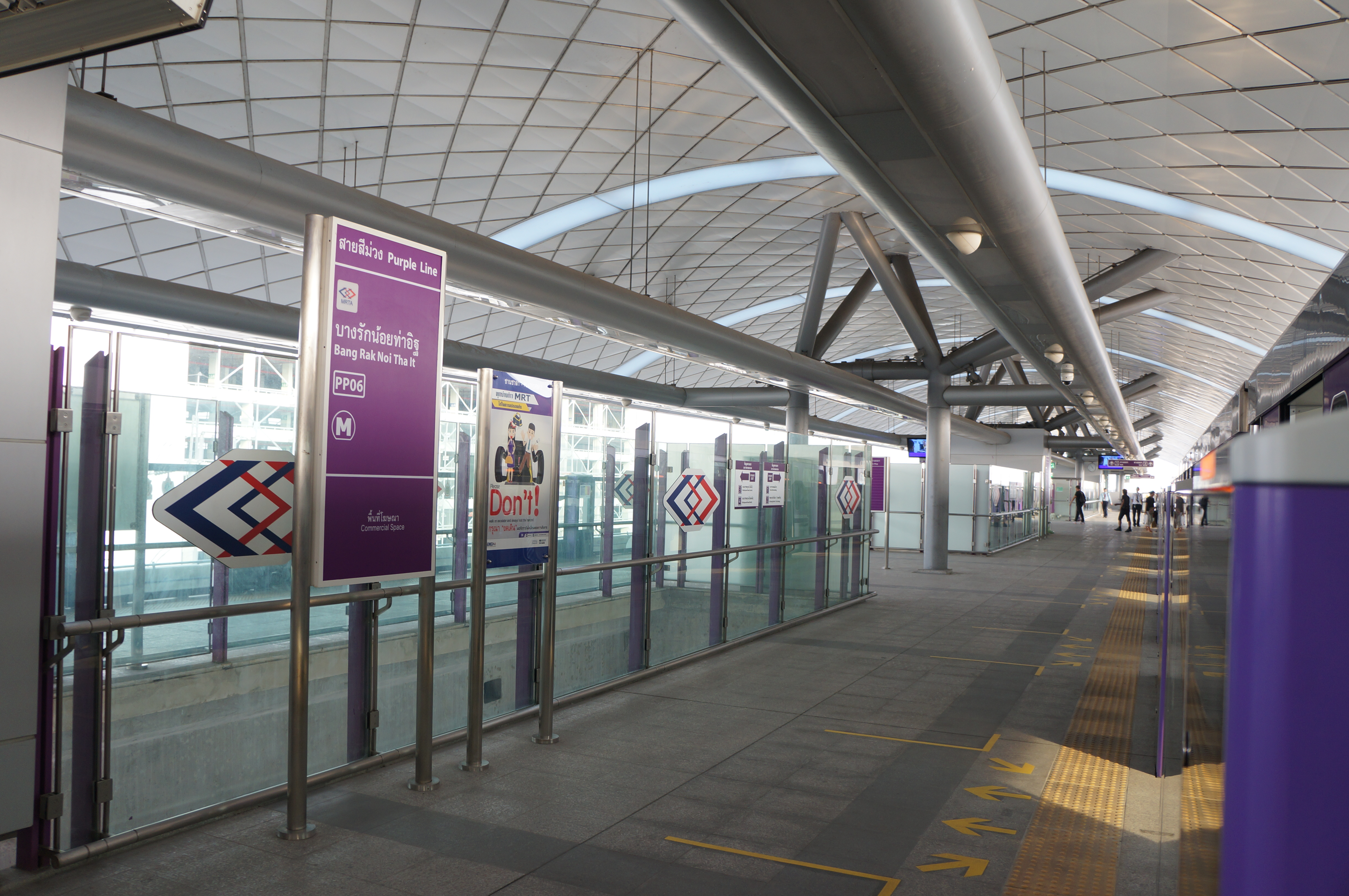
- Platform

General information
- Location: Bang Rak Noi, Mueang Nonthaburi, Nonthaburi, Thailand
- Coordinates: 13°52′29.4″N 100°27′21.5″E
- System: | MRT
- Owner: Mass Rapid Transit Authority of Thailand
- Operator: Bangkok Expressway and Metro Public Company Limited
- Line: Purple Line
- Platforms: 2 (1 island platform)
- Tracks: 2
- Connections: Bus, Taxi

Construction
- Structure type: Elevated
- Parking: Available
- Cycle facilities: Available
- Accessible: yes

Other information
- Station code: PP06

History
- Opened: 6 August 2016; 10 years ago

Passengers
- 2021: 511,948

Services
Preceding station	Metropolitan Rapid Transit	Following station
Bang Rak Yai towards Khlong Bang Phai	Purple Line	Sai Ma towards Tao Poon
Location

Bang Rak Noi Tha It station (Thai: สถานีบางรักน้อยท่าอิฐ, pronounced [sā.tʰǎː.nīː bāːŋ rák nɔ́ːj tʰâː ʔìt]) is a Bangkok MRT station on the Purple Line. The station opened on 6 August 2016 and is located on Rattanathibet road in Nonthaburi Province. The station has four entrances.
