= Bang Rak Yai MRT station =

Train station in Thailand

บางรักใหญ่ PP05 Bang Rak Yai
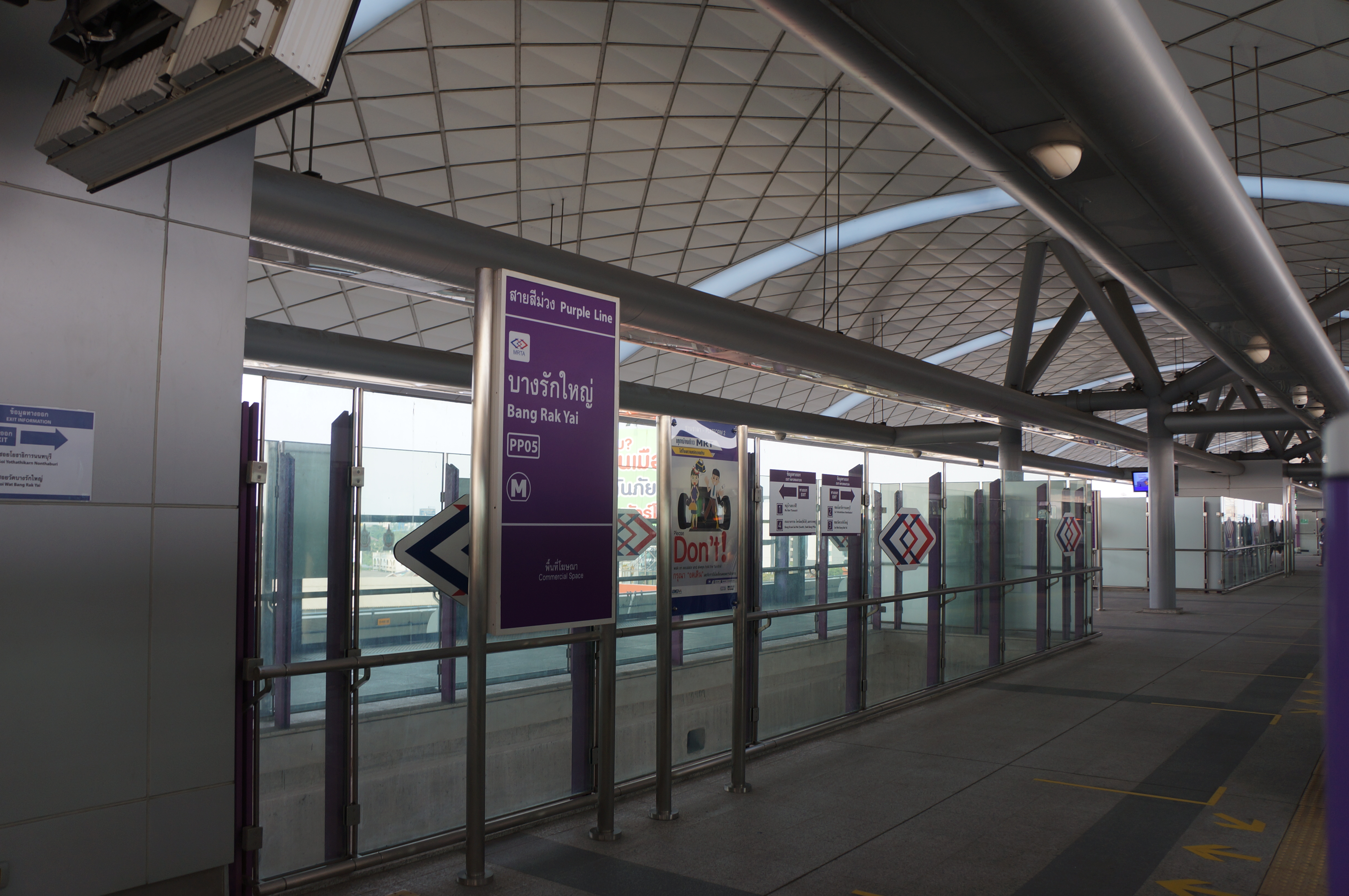
- Platform

General information
- Location: Bang Rak Yai, Bang Bua Thong, Nonthaburi, Thailand
- Coordinates: 13°52′35.8″N 100°26′41.9″E
- System: | MRT
- Owner: Mass Rapid Transit Authority of Thailand
- Operator: Bangkok Expressway and Metro Public Company Limited
- Line: Purple Line
- Platforms: 2 (1 island platform)
- Tracks: 2
- Connections: Bus, Taxi

Construction
- Structure type: Elevated
- Parking: Not available
- Cycle facilities: Available
- Accessible: yes

Other information
- Station code: PP05

History
- Opened: 6 August 2016; 10 years ago

Passengers
- 2021: 256,539

Services
Preceding station	Metropolitan Rapid Transit	Following station
Bang Phlu towards Khlong Bang Phai	Purple Line	Bang Rak Noi Tha It towards Tao Poon
Location

Bang Rak Yai station (Thai: สถานีบางรักใหญ่, pronounced [sā.tʰǎː.nīː bāːŋ rák jàj]) is a Bangkok MRT station on the Purple Line. The station opened on 6 August 2016 and is located on Rattanathibet road in Nonthaburi Province. The station has four entrances.

As of 2021, Bang Rak Yai was the least used station on the entire MRT network.
