= Bang Phlu MRT station =

Monorail station in Thailand

บางพลู PP04 Bang Phlu
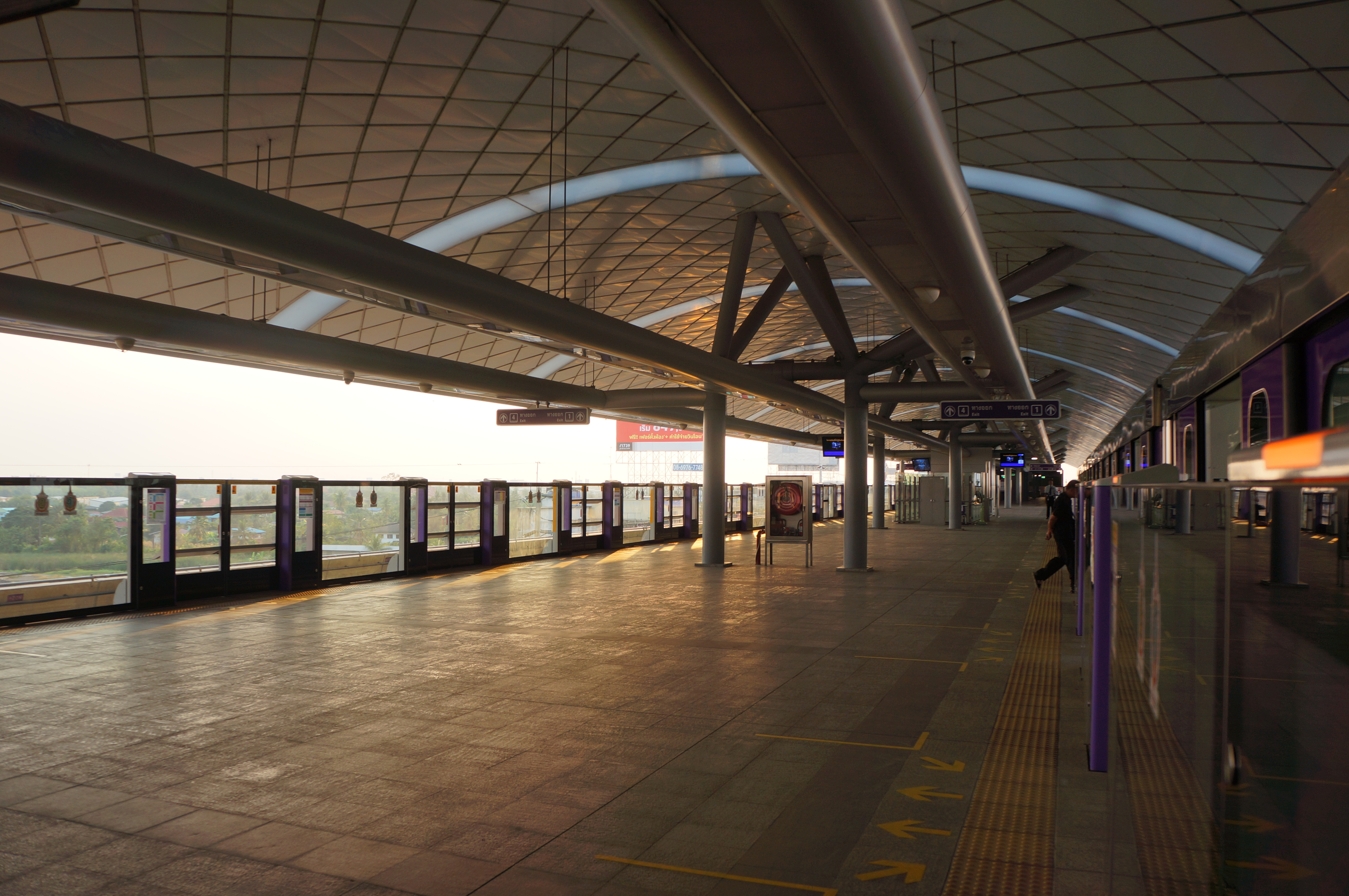
- Platform

General information
- Location: Bang Rak Yai, Bang Bua Thong, Nonthaburi, Thailand
- Coordinates: 13°52′32.8″N 100°26′01.6″E
- System: | MRT
- Owner: Mass Rapid Transit Authority of Thailand
- Operator: Bangkok Expressway and Metro Public Company Limited
- Line: Purple Line
- Platforms: 2 (1 island platform)
- Tracks: 2
- Connections: Bus, Taxi

Construction
- Structure type: Elevated
- Parking: Not available
- Cycle facilities: Available
- Accessible: yes

Other information
- Station code: PP04

History
- Opened: 6 August 2016; 10 years ago

Passengers
- 2021: 495,914

Services
Preceding station	Metropolitan Rapid Transit	Following station
Sam Yaek Bang Yai towards Khlong Bang Phai	Purple Line	Bang Rak Yai towards Tao Poon
Location

Bang Phlu station (Thai: สถานีบางพลู, pronounced [sā.tʰǎː.nīː bāːŋ pʰlūː]) is a Bangkok MRT station on the Purple Line. The station opened on 6 August 2016 and is located on Rattanathibet road in Nonthaburi Province. The station has four entrances.
