= Yaek Nonthaburi 1 MRT station =

Monorail station Thailand

แยกนนทบุรี 1 PP09 Yaek Nonthaburi 1
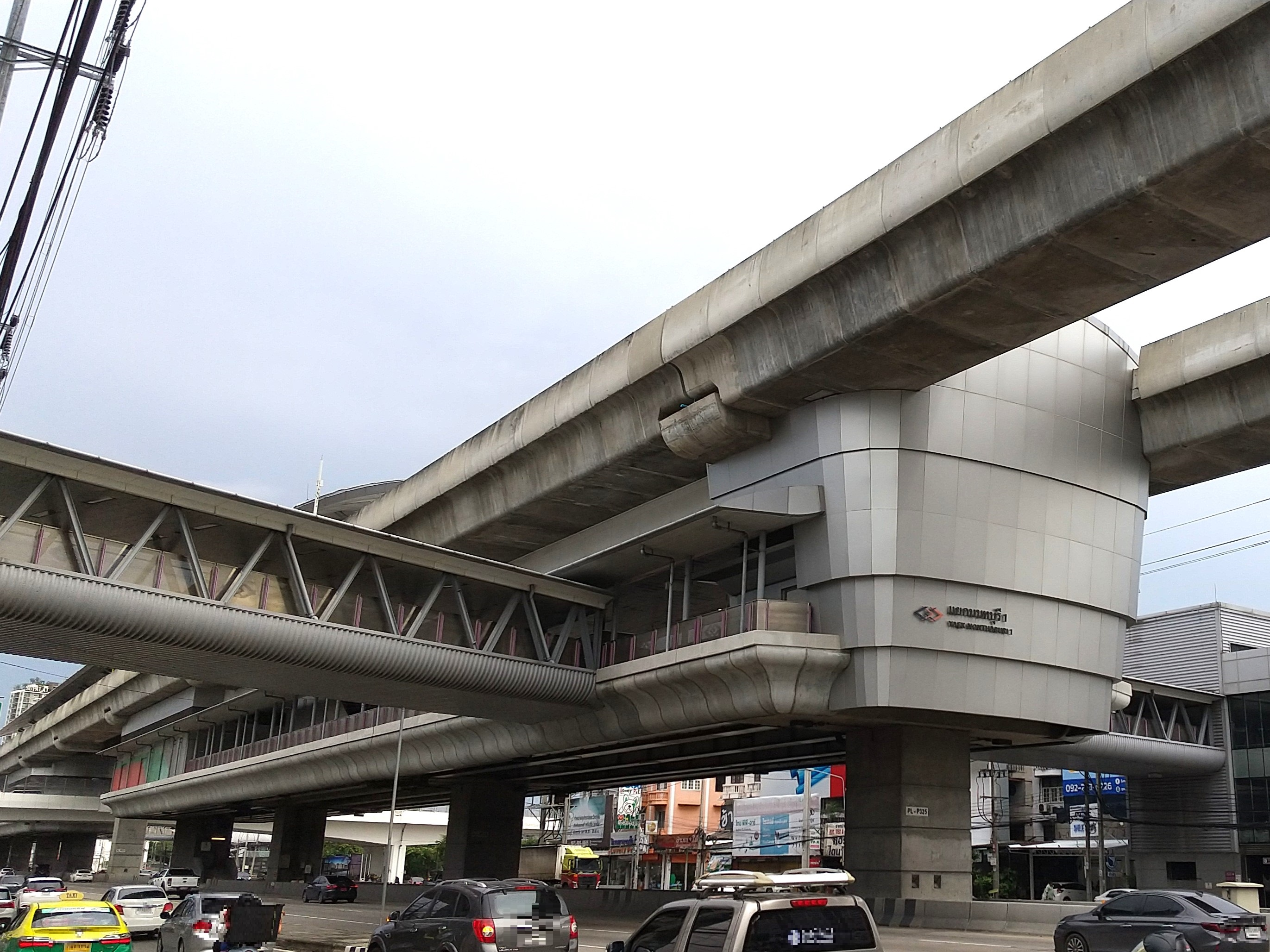

General information
- Location: Bang Kraso, Mueang Nonthaburi, Nonthaburi, Thailand
- Coordinates: 13°51′57.3″N 100°29′39.4″E
- System: MRT
- Owner: Mass Rapid Transit Authority of Thailand
- Operator: Bangkok Expressway and Metro Public Company Limited
- Line: Purple Line
- Platforms: 2 (1 island platform)
- Tracks: 2
- Connections: Bus, Taxi

Construction
- Structure type: Elevated
- Parking: Not available
- Cycle facilities: Available
- Accessible: yes

Other information
- Station code: PP09

History
- Opened: 6 August 2016; 10 years ago

Passengers
- 2021: 753,952

Services
Preceding station	Metropolitan Rapid Transit	Following station
Phra Nang Klao Bridge towards Khlong Bang Phai	Purple Line	Bang Krasor towards Tao Poon
Location

Yaek Nonthaburi 1 station (Thai: สถานีแยกนนทบุรี 1, RTGS: Sathani Yaek Nonthaburi Nueng) is a Bangkok MRT station on the Purple Line. The station opened on 6 August 2016 and is located on Rattanathibet road in Nonthaburi Province. The station has four entrances. The station serves Central NorthVille shopping mall.
