= Sam Yaek Bang Yai MRT station =

Monorail station in Thailand

สามแยกบางใหญ่ PP03 Sam Yaek Bang Yai
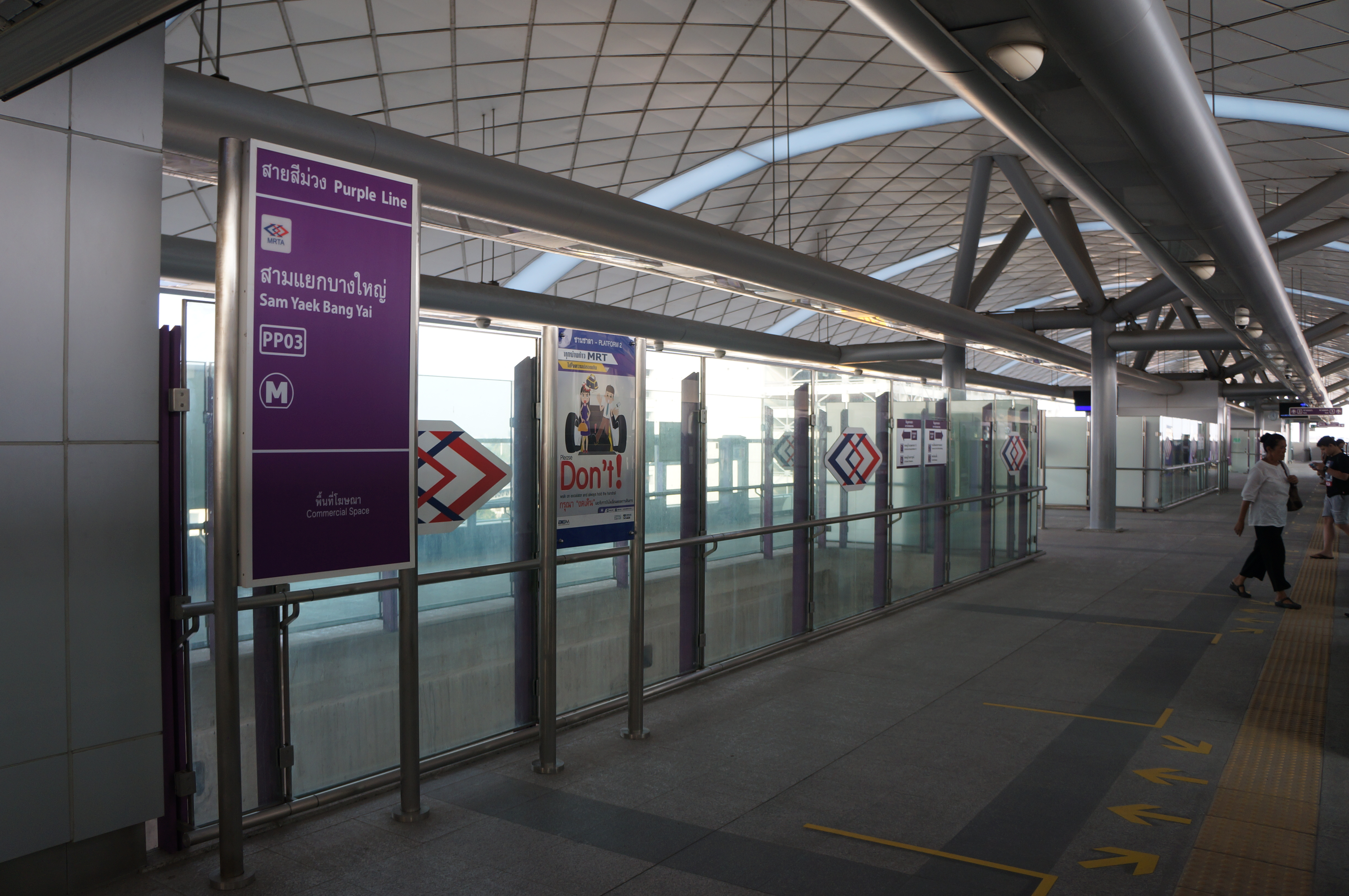
- Platform

General information
- Location: Sao Thong Hin, Bang Yai, Nonthaburi, Thailand
- Coordinates: 13°52′28.8″N 100°25′09.9″E
- System: | MRT
- Owner: Mass Rapid Transit Authority of Thailand
- Operator: Bangkok Expressway and Metro Public Company Limited
- Line: Purple Line
- Platforms: 2 (1 island platform)
- Tracks: 2
- Connections: Bus, Taxi

Construction
- Structure type: Elevated
- Parking: Available
- Cycle facilities: Available
- Accessible: yes

Other information
- Station code: PP03

History
- Opened: 6 August 2016; 10 years ago

Passengers
- 2021: 297,085

Services
Preceding station	Metropolitan Rapid Transit	Following station
Talad Bang Yai towards Khlong Bang Phai	Purple Line	Bang Phlu towards Tao Poon
Location

Sam Yaek Bang Yai Station Traditional sign

Sam Yaek Bang Yai station (Thai: สถานีสามแยกบางใหญ่, pronounced [sā.tʰǎː.nīː sǎːm jɛ̂ːk bāːŋ jàj]) is a Bangkok MRT station on the Purple Line. The station is located on Rattanathibet Road in Nonthaburi Province.
