= Bang Krasor MRT station =

Monorail station in Thailand

บางกระสอ PP10 Bang Krasor
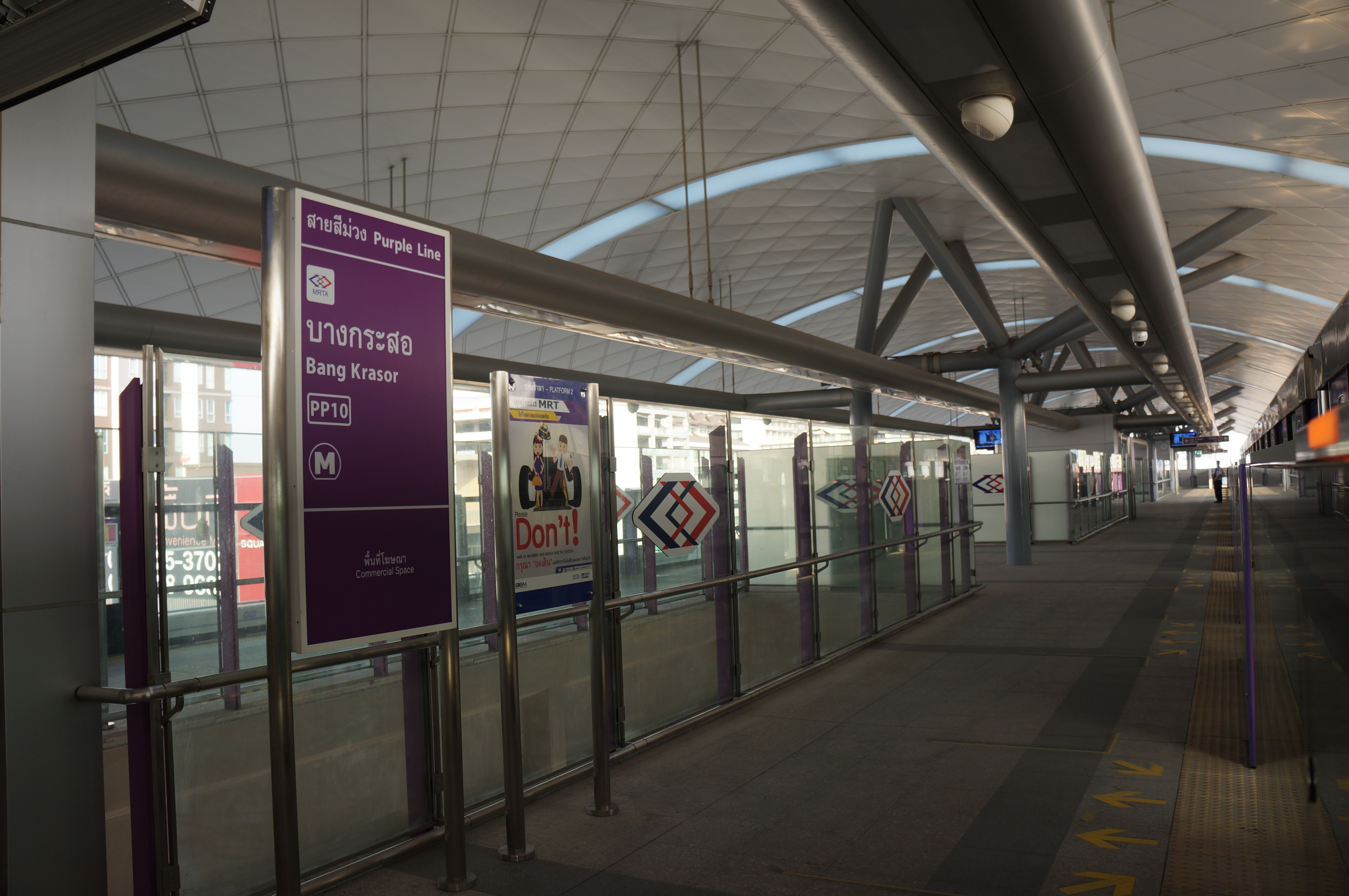
- Platform

General information
- Location: Bang Kraso, Mueang Nonthaburi, Nonthaburi, Thailand
- Coordinates: 13°51′41.9″N 100°30′17.2″E
- System: | MRT
- Owner: Mass Rapid Transit Authority of Thailand
- Operator: Bangkok Expressway and Metro Public Company Limited
- Line: Purple Line
- Platforms: 2 (1 island platform)
- Tracks: 2
- Connections: Bus, Taxi

Construction
- Structure type: Elevated
- Parking: Not available
- Cycle facilities: Available
- Accessible: yes

Other information
- Station code: PP10

History
- Opened: 6 August 2016; 10 years ago
- Former names: Sri Phon Sawan

Passengers
- 2021: 658,599

Services
Preceding station	Metropolitan Rapid Transit	Following station
Yaek Nonthaburi 1 towards Khlong Bang Phai	Purple Line	Nonthaburi Civic Center towards Tao Poon
Location

Bang Krasor station (Thai: สถานีบางกระสอ, RTGS: Sathani Bang Kraso, pronounced [sā.tʰǎː.nīː bāːŋ krā.sɔ̌ː]) is a Bangkok MRT station on the Purple Line. The station opened on 6 August 2016 and is located on Rattanathibet road in Nonthaburi Province. The station has four entrances.
