= Talad Bang Yai MRT station =

Mass Rapid Transit station in Thailand

ตลาดบางใหญ่ PP02 Talad Bang Yai
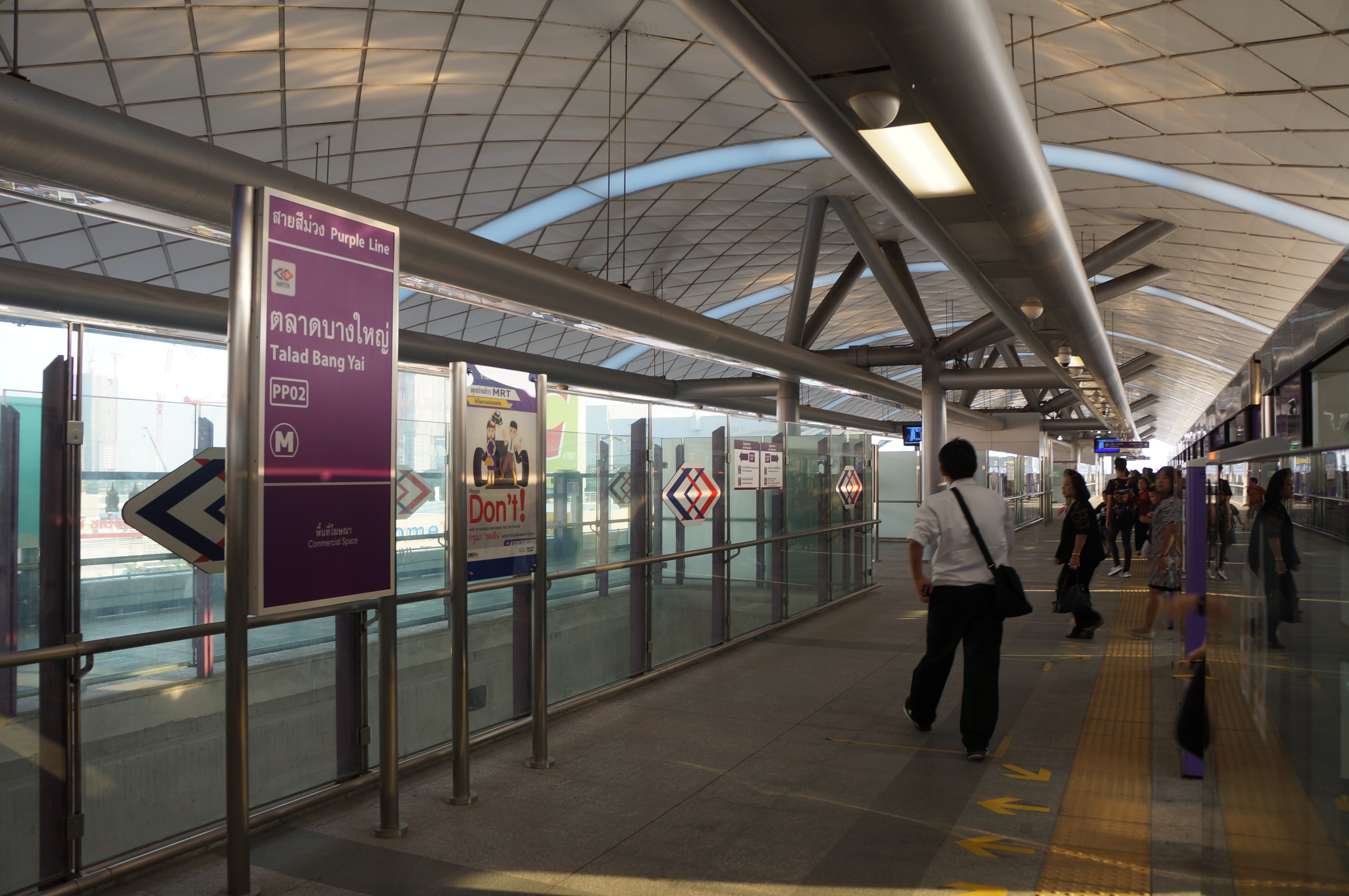
- Platform

General information
- Location: Sao Thong Hin, Bang Yai, Nonthaburi, Thailand
- Coordinates: 13°52′51.7″N 100°24′33.5″E
- System: | MRT
- Owner: Mass Rapid Transit Authority of Thailand
- Operator: Bangkok Expressway and Metro Public Company Limited
- Line: Purple Line
- Platforms: 2 (1 island platform)
- Tracks: 2
- Connections: Bus, Taxi

Construction
- Structure type: Elevated
- Parking: Not available
- Cycle facilities: Available
- Accessible: Yes

Other information
- Station code: PP02

History
- Opened: 6 August 2016; 10 years ago

Passengers
- 2021: 1,777,511

Services
Preceding station	Metropolitan Rapid Transit	Following station
Khlong Bang Phai Terminus	Purple Line	Sam Yaek Bang Yai towards Tao Poon
Location

Talad Bang Yai Station Traditional sign

Talad Bang Yai station (Thai: สถานีตลาดบางใหญ่, RTGS: Sathani Talat Bang Yai, pronounced [sā.tʰǎː.nīː tā.làːt bāːŋ jàj]) is a station on the Purple Line of the Bangkok MRT, located in Bang Yai, Nonthaburi Province. The station connects to Central WestGate shopping mall, one of the largest shopping mall in the country.
