= Purple Line (Bangkok) =

Rapid transit line in Thailand

MRT Purple Line

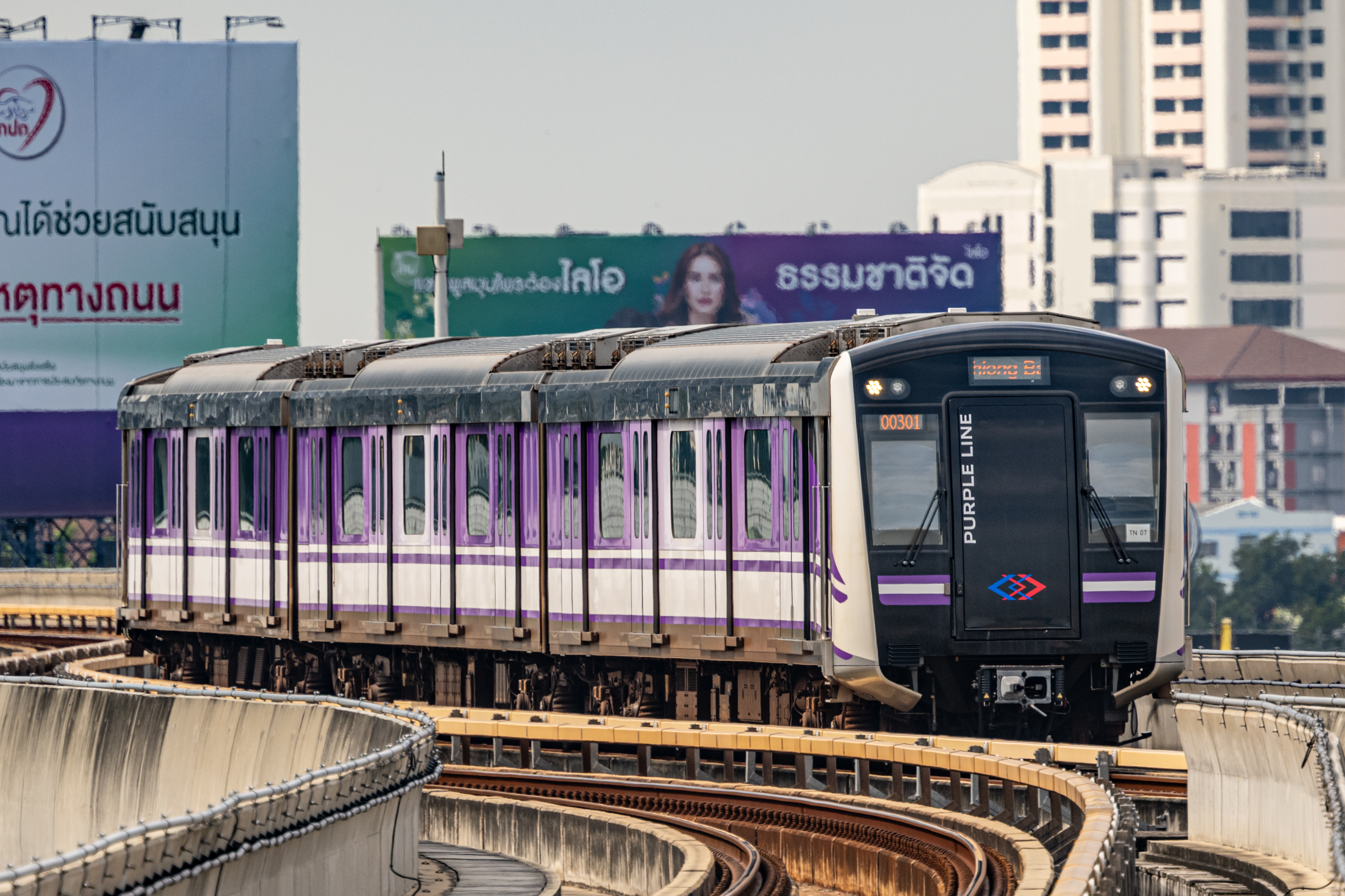
- J-TREC sustina trainset

Overview
- Other name: MRT Chalong Ratchadham Line
- Native name: สายสีม่วง สายฉลองรัชธรรม
- Owner: Mass Rapid Transit Authority
- Locale: Nonthaburi Province and Bangkok
- Termini: PP01 Khlong Bang Phai; PP16 Tao Poon
- Stations: Total: 33 stations 16 (operational); 17 (under construction)
- Color on map: Purple

Service
- Type: Rapid transit
- System: MRT
- Operator: Bangkok Expressway and Metro
- Depot(s): Khlong Bang Phai; Kru Nai (under construction)
- Rolling stock: J-TREC Sustina; S24-EMU: 21 three-car trainsets
- Daily ridership: 66,935 (๋2024)

History
- Work began: 10 November 2009; 17 years ago
- Opened: 6 August 2016; 10 years ago

Technical
- Line length: Total: 43.70 km (27.15 mi); 20.92 km (13.00 mi) (operational); 22.78 km (14.15 mi) (under construction)
- Num of tracks: 2
- Character: Elevated: 30.63 km (19.03 mi); Underground: 13.07 km (8.12 mi)
- Track gauge: 1,435 mm (4 ft 8 1/2 in) standard gauge
- Electrification: 750 V DC third rail
- Operating speed: 80 km/h (50 mph)
- Signalling: Bombardier CITYFLO 650 moving block CBTC ATC under ATO GoA 2 (STO), with subsystems of ATP, ATS and CBI

The MRT Purple Line (Thai: รถไฟฟ้ามหานคร สายสีม่วง) or The M.R.T. Chalong Ratchadham Line (Thai: รถไฟฟ้ามหานคร สายฉลองรัชธรรม) is Bangkok's fifth rapid transit line, following the Sukhumvit Line, Silom Line, Blue Line, and Airport Rail Link. The line is 23 km (14 mi) long, serving the north-western area of Bangkok running from Tao Poon to Khlong Bang Phai in Nonthaburi Province.

The Northern section of the line opened on 6 August 2016, with travel between Khlong Bang Phai and Tao Poon. It is the second line of MRT system and is operated by BEM under a concession contract. Daily ridership is 70,000.

A 23.63 km (14.68 mi), 17 station Southern extension of the line between Tao Poon and Kru Nai consisting of a 14.3 km (8.89 mi) underground section and a 9.3 km (5.78 mi) elevated section commenced construction in August 2022. As of April 2025, construction has progressed to 53.4% completion with an expected opening date of 2028. However, a road collapse in September 2025 caused the opening date to be delayed.

== History ==
Officially named the Chalong Ratchadham Line (Thai: สายฉลองรัชธรรม) – "To Celebrate the Great King's Reign with Righteousness" – but informally known as the "Purple Line", the rapid transit line provides a north–western corridor in Bangkok's Mass Rapid Transit Master Plan. The line also incorporated an extension of the Blue Line from nearby Bang Sue station to Tao Poon Station.

In the 1990s, the plan for the Purple Line was to run from Bang Phut to Bang Sue for 12 kilometres (7.5 mi), with an extension to Thewet for 6.7 kilometers (4.2 mi).

This line was created from the adjustment of the 1994 mass transit rail system master plan, which connected the original extension of the Blue Line from Tao Poon to Bang Yai, while the original Purple Line would have run from the National Library to Tao Poon and the original Orange Line from Samsen (National Library) to Rat Burana, becoming a new line designated as the Purple Line, included in the master plan of the Office of Transport and Traffic Policy and Planning (OTP) for the first time in 2004. Five years later, the line's construction began.

== Northern section ==
Construction was divided into six contracts, three of them for civil works. The contracts were signed from late 2009 to early 2010 and completion was originally scheduled for the end of 2014. The third contract included construction of four park and ride buildings at the Khlong Bang Phai, Sam Yaek Bang Yai, Bang Rak Noi Tha It, and Yaek Nonthaburi 1 stations. On 31 March 2017, the fifth contract was effectively terminated and became part of a new Blue Line concession agreement.

The 2011 Thailand floods delayed the construction of the line for nearly one year. In June 2013, five people were injured when six beams fell onto vehicles below Tao Poon station. In July 2014, the civil work was 94 percent complete; in October 2014, civil work was stated to be 99% complete.

The line opened on 6 August 2016, when King Bhumibol Adulyadej appointed Princess Maha Chakri Sirindhorn to represent him in presiding over the opening ceremony and officially pressing the button to open the electric train system. However, the MRT Blue Line extension to Tao poon was delayed, so when it opened the Purple Line could not interchange with the Blue Line as planned. This resulted in low line usage. Even with a reduced fare, the line only attracted about 22,000 passengers daily compared to a goal of 100,000. A shuttle bus service was in operation between Tao Poon MRT station and Bang Sue MRT station to connect with the Blue Line. When the Blue Line extension finally opened a year later, on 11 August 2017, ridership significantly increased. In 2019, daily ridership was 70,000.

=== Construction contracts ===
Contract	Notes	Contractor(s)	Length (km)
1	Phra Nang Klao Bridge to Tao Poon	CKTC Joint Venture	13
2	Khlong Bang Phai to Phra Nang Klao Bridge	Sino-Thai Engineering & Construction	10.75
3	Khlong Bang Phai Depot and Park & Ride buildings	PAR Joint Venture	
4	Purple Line Rolling stocks and O&M	Bangkok Expressway and Metro	
5	Bang Sue to Tao Poon section and O&M (MRT Blue Line)	Bangkok Expressway and Metro	
6	Track and Electrical	Italian-Thai Development	

== Southern section ==
As the northern section of the Purple line was built first, the second phase of the Purple Line south from Tao Poon via Rattanakosin – Bangkok's old town to Rat Burana would fully complete the line. The length of the southern extension is 23.63 km (14.68 mi): 14.29 km (8.88 mi) underground, 9.34 km (5.80 mi) elevated with 17 stations, ten underground and seven elevated. The initial cost of the southern extension is 82 billion baht and with a planned opening by the end of 2027.

The Thai Cabinet was expected to approve the tender in mid 2017 with a tender then to be issued in the second half of 2017. On 25 July 2017, Cabinet approval was given, but the tender was then delayed until 2018. By December 2018, a tender had still not been issued and was further delayed. In August 2019, subject to final land acquisition, a March 2020 tender was planned. In mid 2020, the Ministry of Transport still aimed for a tendering process within 2020 despite COVID-19 related delays. The MRTA then expected to issue a tender in February 2021. and if construction had begun in 2021, the extension was projected to enter service sometime in 2027. However, the tender was delayed yet again and subsequently cancelled in August 2021 until it was finally issued in November 2021.

Construction contracts were signed on 11 March 2022 with a construction period of 2005 days for a planned 2027 opening date.

=== Construction progress ===
Contactors were issued with a Notice to Proceed on 25 April 2022 giving them access to sites along the route with actual construction planned to begin from August 2022. Construction began in early August for two contract sections, 3 & 4. Some 410 lots and 500 buildings will need to be appropriated to build the extension and as of May 2022 many of them were still to be surveyed.

Construction progress was at 3.45% complete at the end of September 2022. By the end of November 2022, construction progress was at 4.30%. At the end of February 2023, construction had progressed to 7.73%.

By the end of May 2023, construction had progressed to 11.50%.

As of December 2024, construction has progressed to 46.3% completion.

As of June 2025, construction has progressed to 57.6% completion with an expected opening date of 2028.

In August 2025, it was reported that only the section between Parliament House station and National Library station will open in 2027. The opening date for the whole extension is delayed to 2030.

=== Sinkhole incident ===
On 24 September 2025, at approximately 07:13 local time, a sinkhole measuring about 20 metres in depth opened on a section of Samsen Road in Bangkok. The incident occurred near the construction site of Vajira Hospital Station, part of the southern section of the MRT Purple Line.

Following the collapse, the MRTA suspended construction activities at the affected site to investigate the cause of the incident.

=== Construction contracts ===
Contract	Notes	Contractor(s)	Length (km)	Progress (June 2025)	Cost
1	Tao Poon to National Library	CKST Joint Venture	4.8	75.54%	฿19,430 million
2	National Library to Phan Fah	CKST Joint Venture	3.44	65.41%	฿15,878 million
3	Phan Fah to Memorial Bridge	ITD-NWR Joint Venture	3.1	55.18%	฿15,109 million
4	Memorial Bridge to Dao Khanong	Unique Construction and Engineering	4.1	59.09%	฿14,982 million
5	Dao Khanong to Kru Nai & Depot	Italian-Thai Development	9	36.98%	฿19,904 million
6	Track and Electrical	Italian-Thai Development		42.24%	฿3,589 million
7	Rolling stock	TBA		TBA	
Total Progress				57.36%	฿82,083 million

== Stations ==
Code	Station name		Image	Opened	Platform type	Position	Park & Ride	Transfer	Notes
Code	English	Thai	Image	Opened	Platform type	Position	Park & Ride	Transfer	Notes
Khlong Bang Phai - Tao Poon: 20.92 km (operational)
PP01	Khlong Bang Phai	คลองบางไผ่		6 August 2016; 10 years ago	Island	Elevated	Yes		Exit to: • Khlong Bang Phai Depot • DHL Supply Chain & Distribution
PP02	Talad Bang Yai	ตลาดบางใหญ่		6 August 2016; 10 years ago	Island	Elevated	No		Exit to: • Big C Extra Bangyai • The Square Bang Yai • Kasemrad International Hospital Ratthanathibet • Home Pro Rattanathibet • Big C Supercenter Rattanathibet 1 • Decathlon Bangyai • Index Living Mall Bang Yai • Central Westgate • IKEA Bangyai • Bang Yai Market
PP03	Sam Yaek Bang Yai	สามแยกบางใหญ่		6 August 2016; 10 years ago	Island	Elevated	Yes		
PP04	Bang Phlu	บางพลู		6 August 2016; 10 years ago	Island	Elevated	No		Exit to Megahome Rattanathibet
PP05	Bang Rak Yai	บางรักใหญ่		6 August 2016; 10 years ago	Island	Elevated	No		Exit to Wat Bang Rak Yai
PP06	Bang Rak Noi Tha It	บางรักน้อย-ท่าอิฐ		6 August 2016; 10 years ago	Island	Elevated	Yes	Proposed connecting station to BTS (future)	
PP07	Sai Ma	ไทรม้า		6 August 2016; 10 years ago	Island	Elevated	No		
PP08	Phra Nang Klao Bridge	สะพานพระนั่งเกล้า		6 August 2016; 10 years ago	Island	Elevated	No	Connecting station, without paid-area integration to Phra Nang Klao pier for • Mine Smart Ferry • CHAOPHRAYA EXPRESS	Exit to: • Wat Noi Nok • Wat Chaeng Sirisamphan • Tonsak Market • Rajamangala University of Technology Suvarnabhumi - Nonthaburi Campus - North Area
PP09	Yaek Nonthaburi 1	แยกนนทบุรี 1		6 August 2016; 10 years ago	Island	Elevated	Yes		Exit to: • Central NorthVille (was known as Central Rattanathibet) • Owl Market
PP10	Bang Krasor	บางกระสอ		6 August 2016; 10 years ago	Island	Elevated	No		Exit to: • Big C Supercenter Rattanathibet 2 • Grand Richmond Stylish Convention Hotel Formerly Si Phon Sawan
PP11	Nonthaburi Civic Center	ศูนย์ราชการนนทบุรี		6 August 2016; 10 years ago	Island	Elevated	No	Connecting station, without paid-area integration, to • MRT , via a 350-metre elevated pedestrian walkway. • MRT (future)	Exit to: • National Broadcasting and Telecommunications Commission • Nonthaburi Civic Center • Esplanade Cineplex Ngamwongwan – Khae Rai • Siam Business Administration Nonthaburi Technological College • Makut Rommayasaran Park
PP12	Ministry of Public Health	กระทรวงสาธารณสุข		6 August 2016; 10 years ago	Island	Elevated	No		Exit to: • Ministry of Public Health • Srithanya Hospital • Regional Revenue Office 4
PP13	Yaek Tiwanon	แยกติวานนท์		6 August 2016; 10 years ago	Island	Elevated	No		
PP14	Wong Sawang	วงศ์สว่าง		6 August 2016; 10 years ago	Island	Elevated	No		Exit to Big C Market Place Wong Sawang
PP15	Bang Son	บางซ่อน		6 August 2016; 10 years ago	Island	Elevated	No	Connecting station, without paid-area integration, to • SRT • SRT Southern Line	Exit to Bang Son Market
PP16	Tao Poon	เตาปูน		6 August 2016; 10 years ago	Island	Elevated	No	Interchange station to MRT	Exit to: • Tao Poon Market • Lotus's Prachachuen

=== Under construction ===
Code	Station name		Opened	Platform type	Position	Park & Ride	Transfer	Notes	Progress (October 2026)
Code	English	Thai	Opened	Platform type	Position	Park & Ride	Transfer	Notes	Progress (October 2026)
Tao Poon - Kru Nai: 22.78 km (under construction)
PP17	Parliament House	รัฐสภา	2030; 4 years' time (expected)	Island	Underground	No		Exit to: • Thai Parliament • Defence Industrial Department • 4th Armoured Regiment, 1st Division King's Royal Guard • Air Defence Division • Wat Mai Thongsen • Wat Kaew Fah Chulamanee	88.54%
PP18	Sri Yan	ศรีย่าน	2030; 4 years' time (expected)	Stacked	Underground	No		Exit to: • Supreme Complex • Makro Samsen • Royal Irrigation Department • Medium Irrigation Water Resources Development Division • Wimol Sriyan Commercial College Formerly Royal Irrigation Department.	92.15%
PP19	Vajira Hospital	วชิรพยาบาล	2030; 4 years' time (expected)	Stacked	Underground	No		Exit to: • Vajira Hospital • Sukhothai Palace • Market Place Dusit • Suan Dusit University • Saint Gabriel's College	88.15%
PP20	National Library	หอสมุดแห่งชาติ	2030; 4 years' time (expected)	Side	Underground	No		Exit to: • Suan Sunandha Rajabhat University • National Library of Thailand • Rajamangala University of Technology Phra Nakhon • Thewet, Wat Thewarat Kunchorn	88.87%
PP21	Bang Khun Phrom	บางขุนพรหม	2030; 4 years' time (expected)	Stacked	Underground	No		Exit to: • Bank of Thailand • Bank of Thailand Museum • Bang Khun Phrom Palace • Wat Sam Phraya	88.77%
PP22	Democracy Monument	อนุสาวรีย์ประชาธิปไตย	2030; 4 years' time (expected)	Stacked	Underground	No	Interchange station to MRT (under construction)	Exit to: • Mahakan Fort • Rattanakosin Exhibition Hall • Queen Sirikit Gallery • Royal Pavilion Mahajetsadabadin • Wat Saket Formerly Phan Fa	88.80%
PP23	Sam Yot	สามยอด	2030; 4 years' time (expected)	Island	Underground	No	Interchange station to MRT	Exit to: • Giant Swing (including Wat Suthat and Wat Dev Mandir) • Khlong Ong Ang • Mega Plaza Saphan Lek • Phahurat • Rommaninat Park • The Old Siam Plaza	54.88%
PP24	Memorial Bridge	สะพานพุทธฯ	2030; 4 years' time (expected)	Island	Underground	No	Proposed connecting station to Prachathipok station for MRL	Exit to: • Suksanari School • Wat Prayurawongsawat Worawihan • Wat Phitchaya Yatikaram Worawihan • Wat Anongkharam Worawihan • Big C Supercenter Itsaraphap	71.79%
PP25	Wongwian Yai	วงเวียนใหญ่	2030; 4 years' time (expected)	Island	Underground	No	Connecting station, without paid-area integration to • BTS via 270-metre underground walkway • SRT via 120-metre covered walkway (future)	Exit to: • Wongwian Yai Market • Wongwian Yai	59.85%
PP26	Somdech Phra Pinklao Hospital	โรงพยาบาลสมเด็จพระปิ่นเกล้า	2030; 4 years' time (expected)	Island	Underground	No		Exit to: • Somdech Phra Pinklao Hospital • Samre Market Formerly Samre	65.47%
PP27	Dao Khanong	ดาวคะนอง	2030; 4 years' time (expected)	Side	Elevated	No		Exit to: • Big C Supercenter Dao Khanong • Wat Mongkhon Wararam	26.82%
PP28	Bang Pakaeo	บางปะแก้ว	2030; 4 years' time (expected)	Side	Elevated	No			28.81%
PP29	Bang Pakok	บางปะกอก	2030; 4 years' time (expected)	Side	Elevated	Yes		Exit to: • Wat Bang Pakok • Bang Pakok Wittayakom School • Bangpakok 1 Hospital • Bang Pakok Fresh Market • Lotus's Bangpakok	28.30%
PP30	Yaek Pracha Uthit	แยกประชาอุทิศ	2030; 4 years' time (expected)	Side	Elevated	No		Exit to: • Bangkok Employment Office Area 2 • Han Clan Foundation of Thailand • Wat Sarod School • Wat Sarod Formerly Rama 9 Bridge	46.88%
PP31	Rat Burana	ราษฎร์บูรณะ	2030; 4 years' time (expected)	Side	Elevated	Yes			29.59%
PP32	Phra Pradaeng	พระประแดง	2030; 4 years' time (expected)	Side	Elevated	No		Exit to: • Phra Pradaeng Arcade Market • HomePro Suk Sawat • Big C Supercenter Suksawat • Thaiwatsadu Suk Sawat	43.03%
PP33	Khru Nai	ครุใน	2030; 4 years' time (expected)	Side	Elevated	No		Exit to Wat Kru Nai	33.35%

== Infrastructure ==
=== Depot ===
The Khlong Bang Phai Depot serves as the main maintenance facility for the entire MRT Purple Line. It is on Kanchanaphisek Road, near Khlong Bang Phai Station. Additionally, the Kru Nai stabling yard is currently under construction as part of the Purple Line Southern Section project. It is near the southern section of Kanchanaphisek Road in Phra Pradaeng District, Samut Prakan Province.

=== Park & Ride ===
There are currently four Park & Ride facilities along the MRT Purple Line, at Khlong Bang Phai, Sam Yaek Bang Yai, Bang Rak Noi Tha It, and Yaek Nonthaburi 1 stations. Two additional facilities are under construction at Bang Pakok and Rat Burana stations as part of the Purple Line Southern Section project.

=== Station ===
The MRT Purple Line comprises 33 stations, with 16 currently in operation since 2016—all of which are elevated. The remaining 17 stations are under construction and expected to be completed by 2029, consisting of 10 underground and 7 elevated stations.

Station structures on the MRT Purple Line North Section range from 300 to 400 meters in length and approximately 18 meters in width. In the Southern Section, underground stations typically measure 250 meters in length and 20 meters in width, while elevated stations are 153 meters long and 25 meters wide. All stations are designed to accommodate a maximum of six cars per train. Elevated stations are equipped with half-height platform screen doors, while underground stations will be fitted with full-height platform screen doors. In addition, the entrances to the stations are designed to be about one meter above ground level, taking into account the highest recorded flood levels in Bangkok to prepare for potential future flooding events.

=== Rolling stock ===
In November 2013, BEM contracted with Marubeni Corp, Toshiba Corp, and East Japan Railway Company to install E&S systems, supply 21 three-car trains (total of 63 cars) rolling stock, and provide maintenance for 10 years as part of a contract worth 12.6 billion baht. East Japan Railway train manufacturing subsidiary J-TREC built them in Yokohama with the first sets delivered in early 2016. The trains are owned by the MRTA which paid for the rolling stock at BEMs request. The southern extension will acquire 17 additional trains, along with the current ones, to create a total of 38 trains.

In total, line is service by 21 three-car trains. Trains are powered by 750 V DC via third rail system, are air-conditioned and capable of traveling at up to 80 km/h (50 mph).

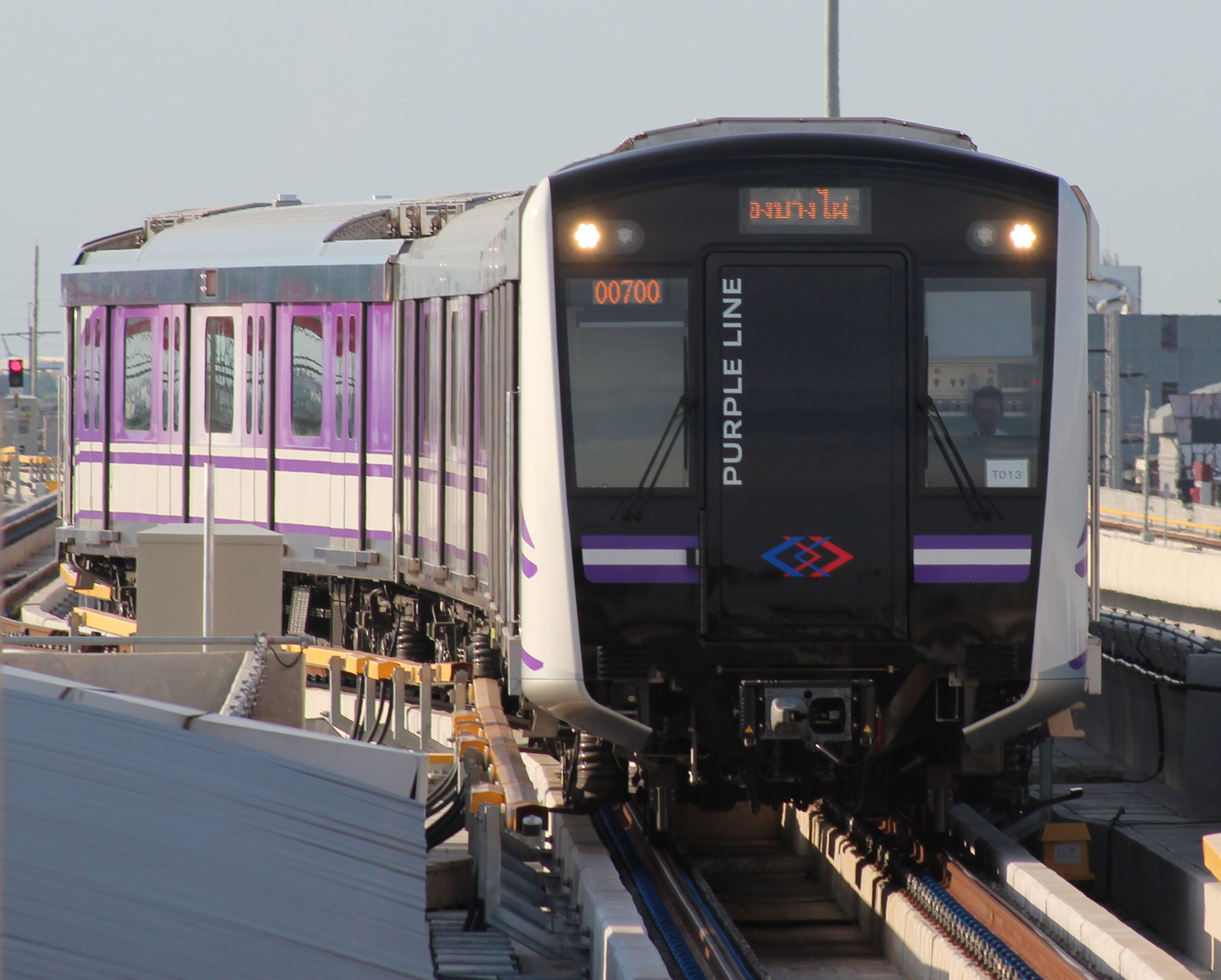
MRT Purple Line train entering a station.

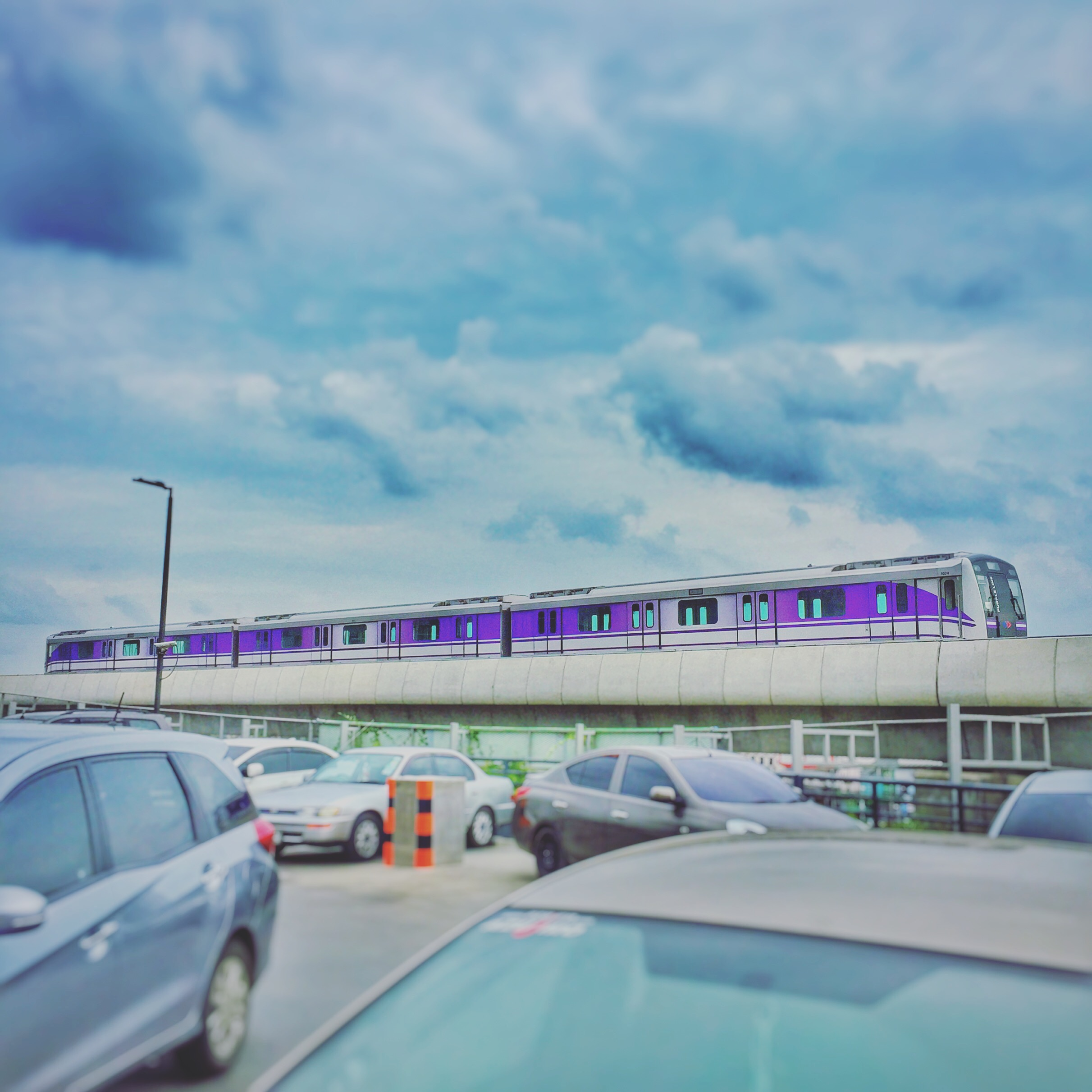
Purple Line train spotted near Central WestGate.

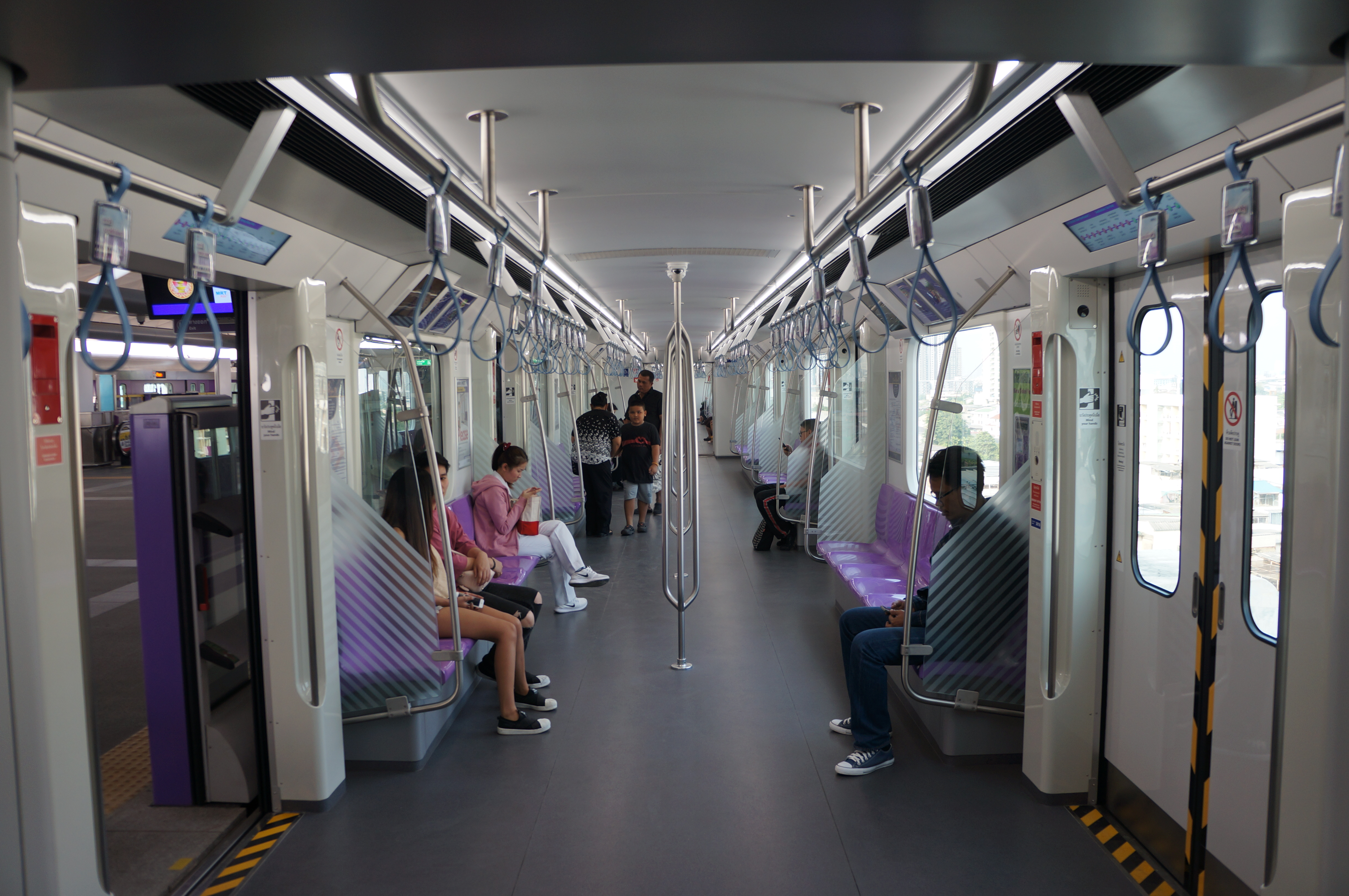
Interior of a train.

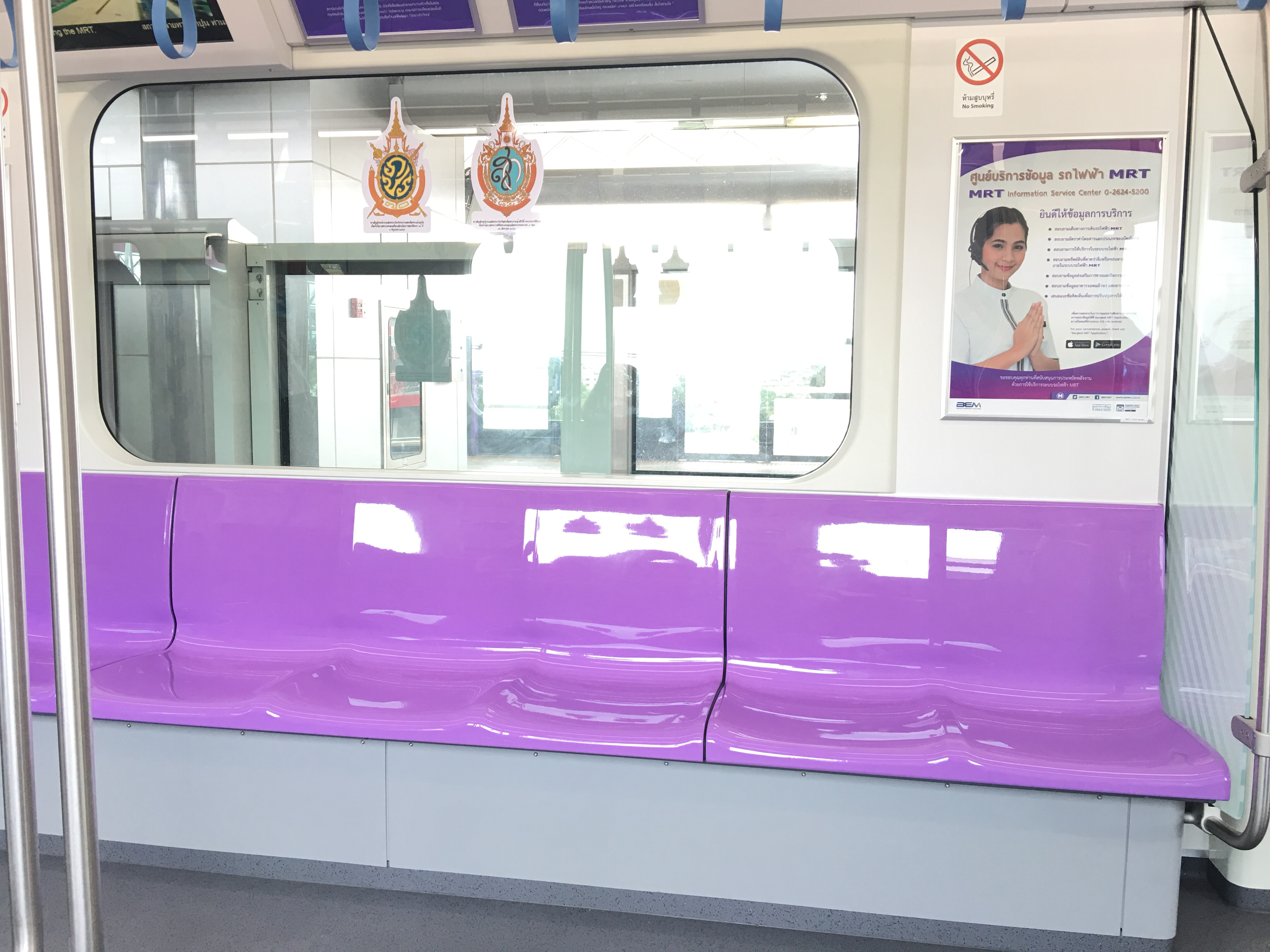
Interior of a train.

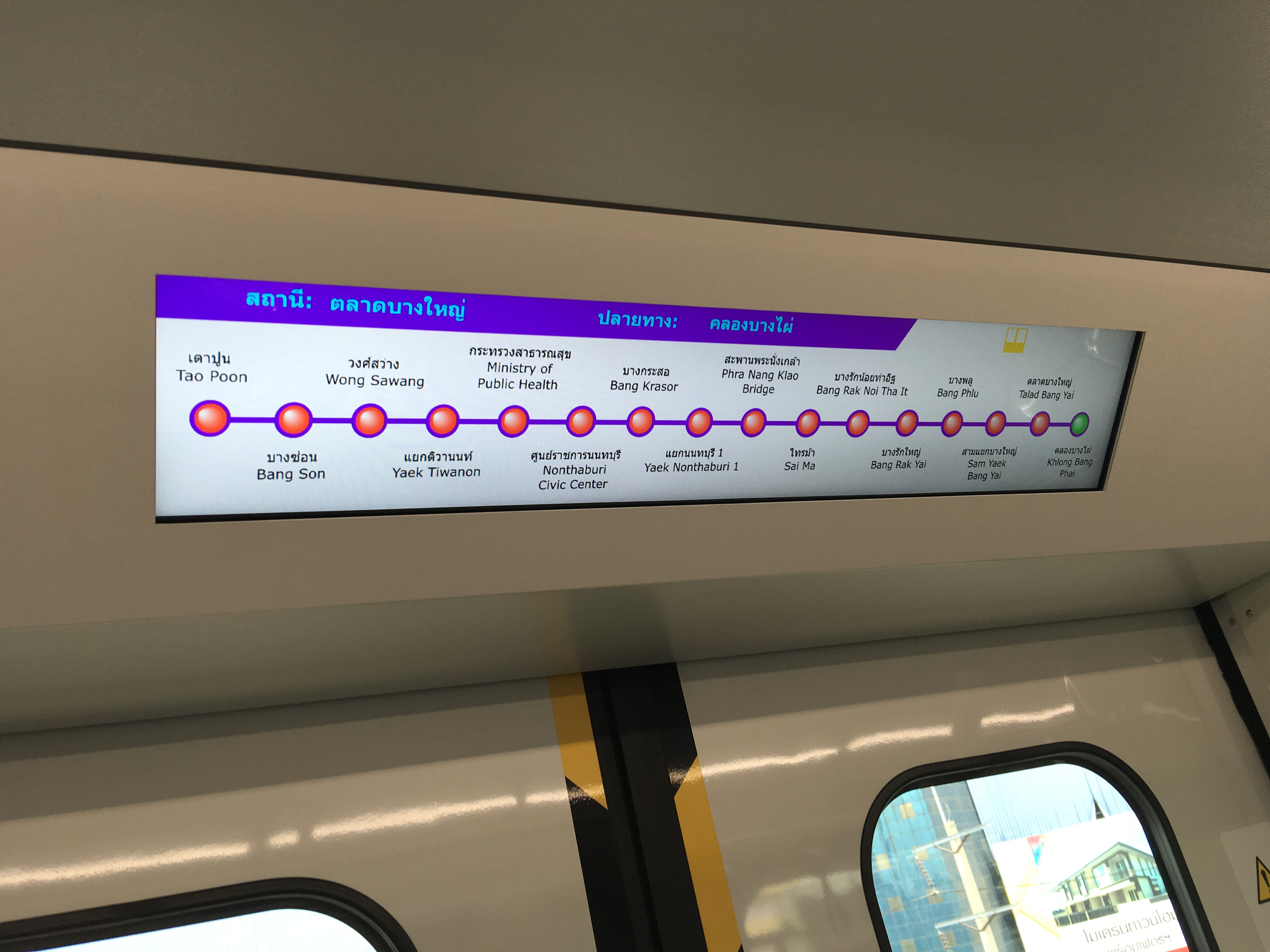
Dynamic route map

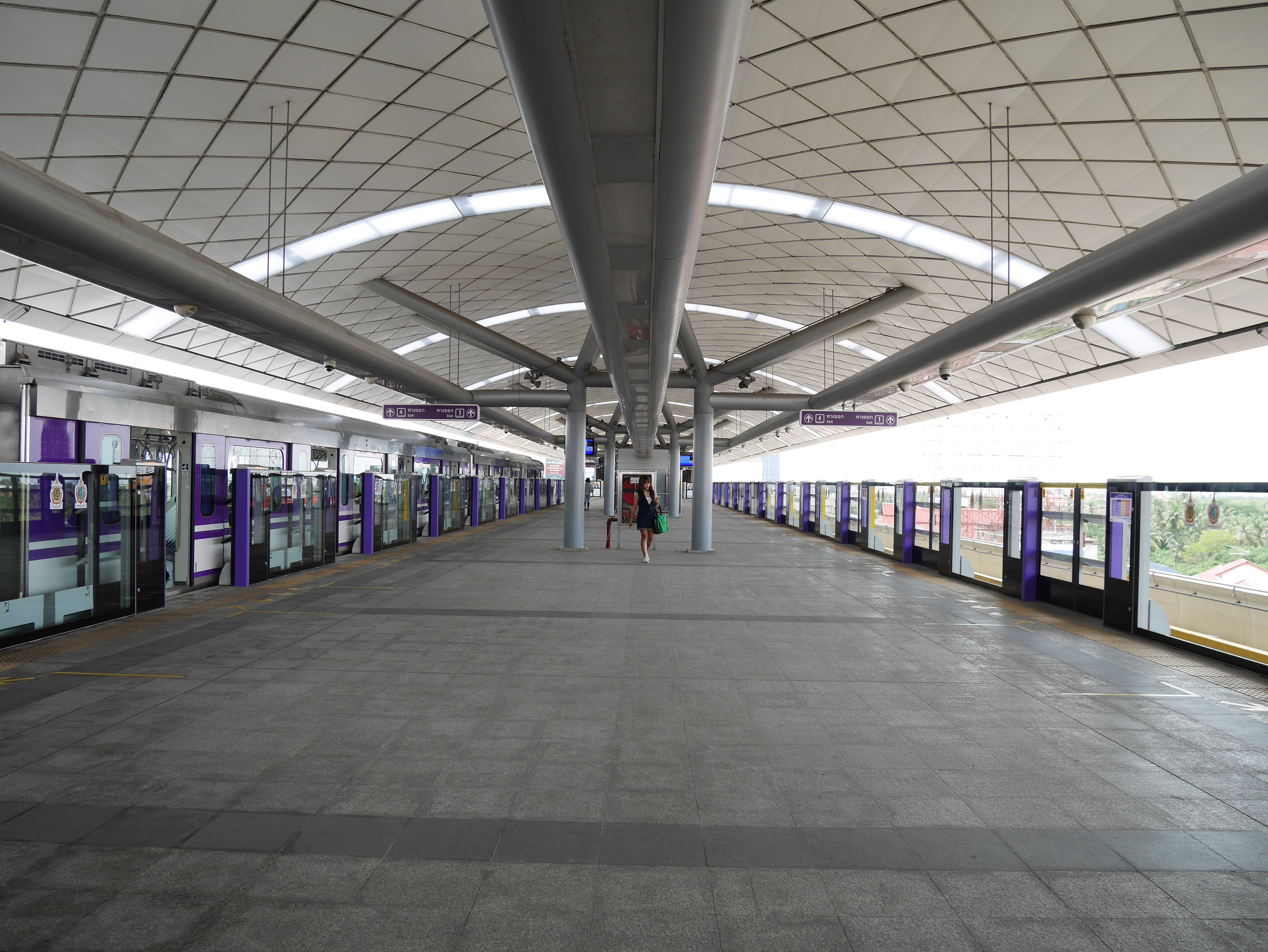
Platform Level at Bang Phlu station

=== Signaling system ===
Bombardier Cityflo 650 signaling system has been implemented for the MRT Purple Line project. This communication-based train control (CBTC) system supports automatic train operation (ATO), allowing for efficient and safe control of train movements. It enables real-time train monitoring, optimizing operations and minimizing delays while prioritizing passenger safety. Additionally, the system ensures a minimum headway of just ninety seconds.

== Operation ==
=== Service hour ===
The line operates with varying schedules across stations. The first train departs from Khlong Bang Phai station at 5:30 AM and from Tao Poon station at 6:00 AM. The frequency of train services depends on the time of day and passenger volume. The service hours are determined by the departure time of the last train heading to Khlong Bang Phai station. For example, when the last train departs from Tao Poon station at 11:24 PM, that marks the closing time for all stations, with the final closure occurring at Talad Bang Yai Station.

=== Headways ===
MRT Purple Line headway
Time	Headway (Minutes:Seconds)
Monday - Friday
05.30 - 06.30	07:12
06:30 - 08:30	04:50
08:30 - 09:30	06:25
09:30 - 17:00	08:30
17:00 - 20:00	04:50
20:00 - 21:00	06:25
21:00 - 24:00	09:30
Saturday
06:00 - 16:00	09:30
16:00 - 21:00	07:15
21:00 - 24:00	09:30
Saturday to Sunday and Public Holiday
06:00 - 24:00	09:30

=== Ridership ===
When the Purple Line first opened daily ridership was only 22,000 compared to projected numbers of 100,000. After the opening of the Blue Line extension to Tao Poon 1 year later in August 2017, daily average ridership increased significantly from 33,000 to 50,000.

In August 2018, the MRTA Deputy Governor stated that daily ridership had increased to 60,000 each weekday. By late 2019, this had increased to 70,000. In 2023 the purple line saw an average of 50385 passengers per day.

On 16 October 2023, MRT Purple Line began using the new fare rates of 14 to 20 baht (down from 16 to 42 baht) after the '20 Baht Transit Max Fares Policy' was approved by the Thai government.

From 25 to 31 January 2025, Prime Minister Paetongtarn Shinawatra implemented a policy of free public transportation in Bangkok for one week. This measure aimed to address the worsening air pollution caused by surging dust levels across all districts of the capital.

MRT Purple Line ridership
Year	Quarter	Quarterly ridership	Daily ridership	Annual ridership	Remarks
2016	Q1			3,074,389	
2016	Q2			3,074,389	
2016	Q3	1,161,989	20,731	3,074,389	PP01 Khlong Bang Phai - PP16 Tao Poon section opened on 6 August 2016.
2016	Q4	1,912,400	20,796	3,074,389	
2017	Q1	1,969,874	21,888	11,626,990	
2017	Q2	2,196,900	24,142	11,626,990	
2017	Q3	3,437,488	37,364	11,626,990	BL10 Tao Poon - BL11 Bang Sue section on MRT Blue Line opened on 11 August 2017, PP16 Tao Poon became a connecting station.
2017	Q4	4,022,728	44,206	11,626,990	
2018	Q1	4,005,632	44,508	17,644,588	
2018	Q2	4,120,533	45,281	17,644,588	
2018	Q3	4,791,613	52,083	17,644,588	
2018	Q4	4,726,810	51,379	17,644,588	
2019	Q1	4,699,831	52,221	19,726,225	
2019	Q2	4,665,231	52,419	19,726,225	
2019	Q3	5,298,016	57,588	19,726,225	
2019	Q4	5,063,147	55,035	19,726,225	
2020	Q1	4,719,549	51,863	16,836,638	1st wave of COVID-19 outbreaks (January 2020 - May 2020)
2020	Q2	2,208,015	24,264	16,836,638	1st wave of COVID-19 outbreaks (January 2020 - May 2020)
2020	Q3	4,840,866	52,619	16,836,638	
2020	Q4	5,068,208	55,089	16,836,638	2nd wave of COVID-19 outbreaks (December 2020 - February 2021)
2021	Q1	3,475,384	38,615	9,841,934	2nd wave of COVID-19 outbreaks (December 2020 - February 2021)
2021	Q2	1,993,392	21,668	9,841,934	3rd wave of COVID-19 outbreaks (April 2021 - June 2021)
2021	Q3	1,417,404	15,407	9,841,934	4th wave of COVID-19 outbreaks (July 2021 - early 2022); SRT Light Red Line opened on 21 August 2021, PP15 Bang Son became a connecting station.
2021	Q4	2,955,754	32,128	9,841,934	4th wave of COVID-19 outbreaks (July 2021 - early 2022); SRT Light Red Line opened on 21 August 2021, PP15 Bang Son became a connecting station.
2022	Q1	2,946,430	32,739	16,450,757	4th wave of COVID-19 outbreaks (July 2021 - early 2022); SRT Light Red Line opened on 21 August 2021, PP15 Bang Son became a connecting station.
2022	Q2	3,569,128	39,222	16,450,757	4th wave of COVID-19 outbreaks (July 2021 - early 2022); SRT Light Red Line opened on 21 August 2021, PP15 Bang Son became a connecting station.
2022	Q3	4,691,107	50,991	16,450,757	
2022	Q4	5,244,092	57,001	16,450,757	
2023	Q1	5,122,816	56,921	21,508,224	
2023	Q2	4,897,809	53,823	21,508,224	
2023	Q3	5,623,257	61,123	21,508,224	
2023	Q4	5,864,342	63,742	21,508,224	Began using 14–20 baht fare rates from 16 October 2023. MRT Pink Line opened on 21 November 2023, PP11 Nonthaburi Civic Center became a connecting station.
2024	Q1	6,005,239	65,992	24,675,599	
2024	Q2	5,718,198	62,837	24,675,599	
2024	Q3	6,628,438	72,049	24,675,599	
2024	Q4	6,323,724	68,737	24,675,599	
2025	Q1	6,295,927	69,622	24,999,442	Free public transportation policy was implemented between 25 and 31 January 2025. Train services were temporarily suspended due to the 2025 Myanmar earthquake on 28 March.
2025	Q2	5,806,279	63,806	24,999,442	
2025	Q3	6,609,854	71,847	24,999,442	
2025	Q4	6,287,382	68,342	24,999,442	As of December 2025. Starting 1 December 2025, the 14–20 baht fare rates were replaced by a 40-baht daily fare cap for passengers using credit or debit cards.
2026	Q1	5,802,153	64,468	17,182,403	
2026	Q2	5,359,992	58,901	17,182,403	
2026	Q3	6,020,258	65,438	17,182,403	As of September 2026
2026	Q4			17,182,403	

=== Fares ===
MRT Purple Line fare is calculated based on the travel distance between the origin and destination stations. Previously, fares ranged from 14 to 42 baht, with a maximum of 70 baht when transferring to the MRT Blue Line.

==== Implementation of the 20-Baht Fare Cap (2023–2025) ====
Following the introduction of the policy in October 2023, fares were reduced to a range of 14 to 20 baht, with a new maximum of 51 baht when transferring to the Blue Line. Discounted fares were available for children under 14 and senior citizens, starting at 7 baht and capped at 36 baht with a Blue Line transfer. Student fares started at 13 baht and rise to 48 baht when including a transfer to the Blue Line.

The policy was discontinued on 30 November 2025 and was replaced by a 40-baht daily fare cap for credit or debit card users; this policy also applies to the SRT Red Lines.

==== EMV Payment and Transfer Privileges ====
EMV Card users will receive a 15 baht discount when transferring from the Purple Line to the Pink Line, and a 14 baht discount when transferring in the opposite direction. Senior citizens are eligible for an 8 baht discount when transferring from the Purple Line to the Pink Line, and a 7 baht discount when transferring from the Pink Line to the Purple Line. Students will receive a 15 baht discount when transferring from the Purple Line to the Pink Line, and a 13 baht discount when transferring from the Pink Line to the Purple Line.

Following the Cabinet's approval on 25 November 2025, a new 'Daily Fare Cap' measure was introduced to reduce the cost of living, effective from 1 December 2025 to 30 November 2026. This policy applies to travel on the MRT Purple Line and SRT Red Lines. General passengers using EMV Contactless cards are subject to a maximum fare of 40 baht per day. Students are eligible for a 10% discount on fares with a daily cap of 30 baht, provided the same card is used for all trips. Meanwhile, state welfare cardholders, persons with disabilities, senior citizens, and children continue to receive their existing discounts or fare exemptions; specifically, senior citizens remain entitled to a 50% discount.

== Incidents ==
=== 2025 Myanmar earthquake ===
On 28 March, a 7.7-magnitude earthquake in Myanmar struck Bangkok, leading to the temporary suspension of all train services to ensure readiness for resumption and to prepare for potential aftershocks. The line resumed normal service on the next day.

=== 2025 Bangkok road collapse ===
On 24 September 2025, a section of Samsen Road collapsed, creating a large sinkhole in front of Vajira Hospital. The hole was estimated to be about 30 metres wide and nearly 50 metres deep, swallowing several vehicles and damaging water pipes, power lines, and other infrastructure. Although no injuries were reported, parts of the Sam Sen police station and nearby buildings were evacuated, and the hospital suspended some services for two days as a precaution.

Officials linked the collapse to soil erosion associated with the construction of the MRT Purple Line South section and a possible leakage from water pipes beneath the road. Initial repair work involved pouring large amounts of concrete into the cavity, but engineers were forced to stop when the material began seeping into a nearby tunnel through a breach in its wall. By the following day, the ground continued to shift, complicating stabilization efforts. Authorities responded by closing off the area, installing monitoring equipment, and preparing plans for a permanent retaining wall.

The Bangkok Metropolitan Administration stated that full repairs would require thousands of tonnes of concrete and additional engineering measures. Inspections of surrounding structures are ongoing, and traffic on Samsen Road is expected to resume by 9 October 2025.

== Network map ==
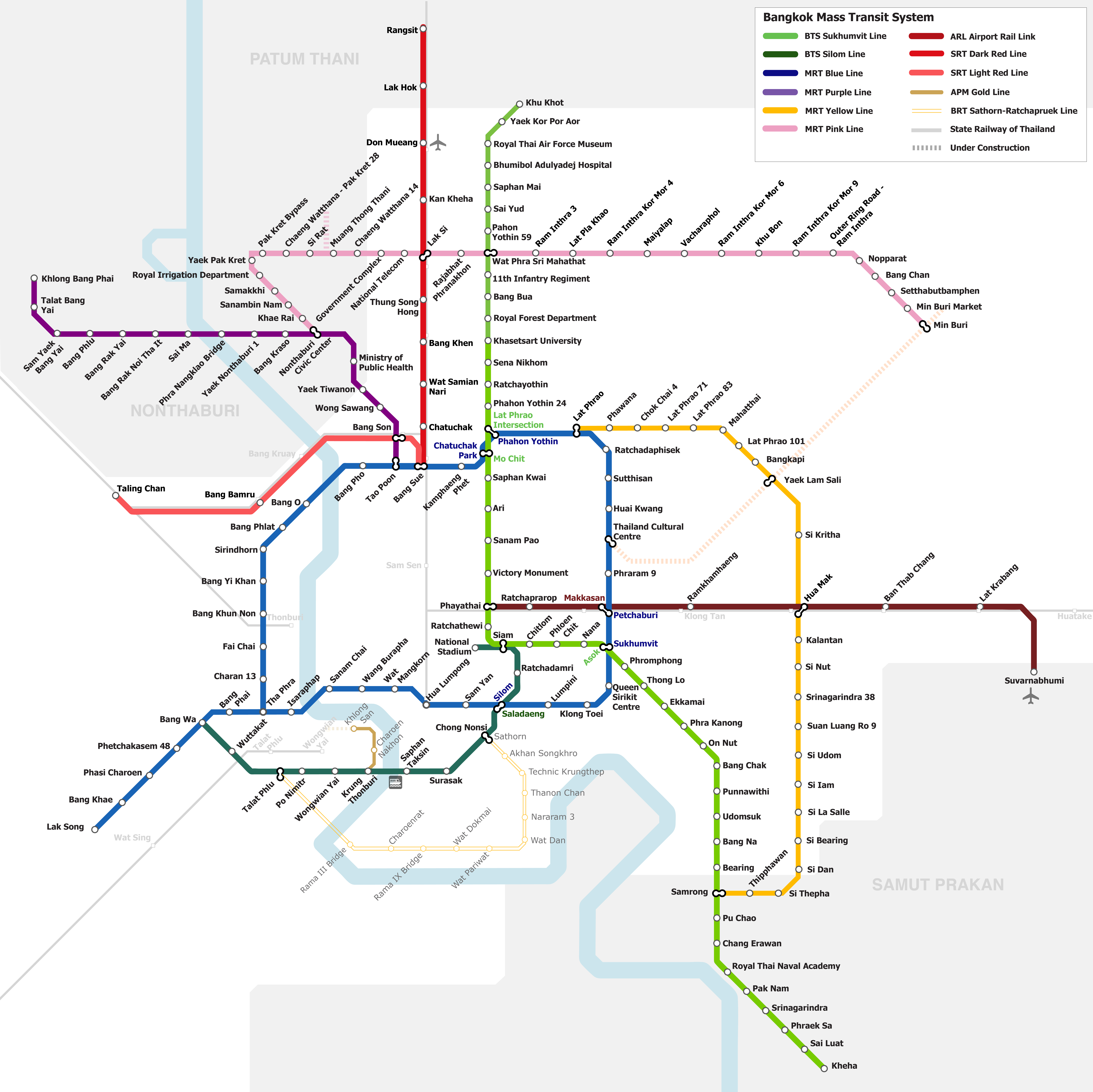

== See also ==
- Mass Rapid Transit Master Plan in Bangkok Metropolitan Region
- Bangkok Metro
- MRT Blue Line
- MRT Brown Line
- MRT Grey Line
- MRT Light Blue Line
- MRT Orange Line
- MRT Pink Line
- MRT Yellow Line
- BTS Skytrain
- Sukhumvit Line
- Silom Line
- Airport Rail Link (Bangkok)
- SRT Dark Red Line
- SRT Light Red Line
- Bangkok BRT
- BMA Gold Line
- BMA Bang Na-Airport Line
