= Khlong Bang Phai MRT station =

Mass Rapid Transit station in Thailand

คลองบางไผ่ PP01 Khlong Bang Phai
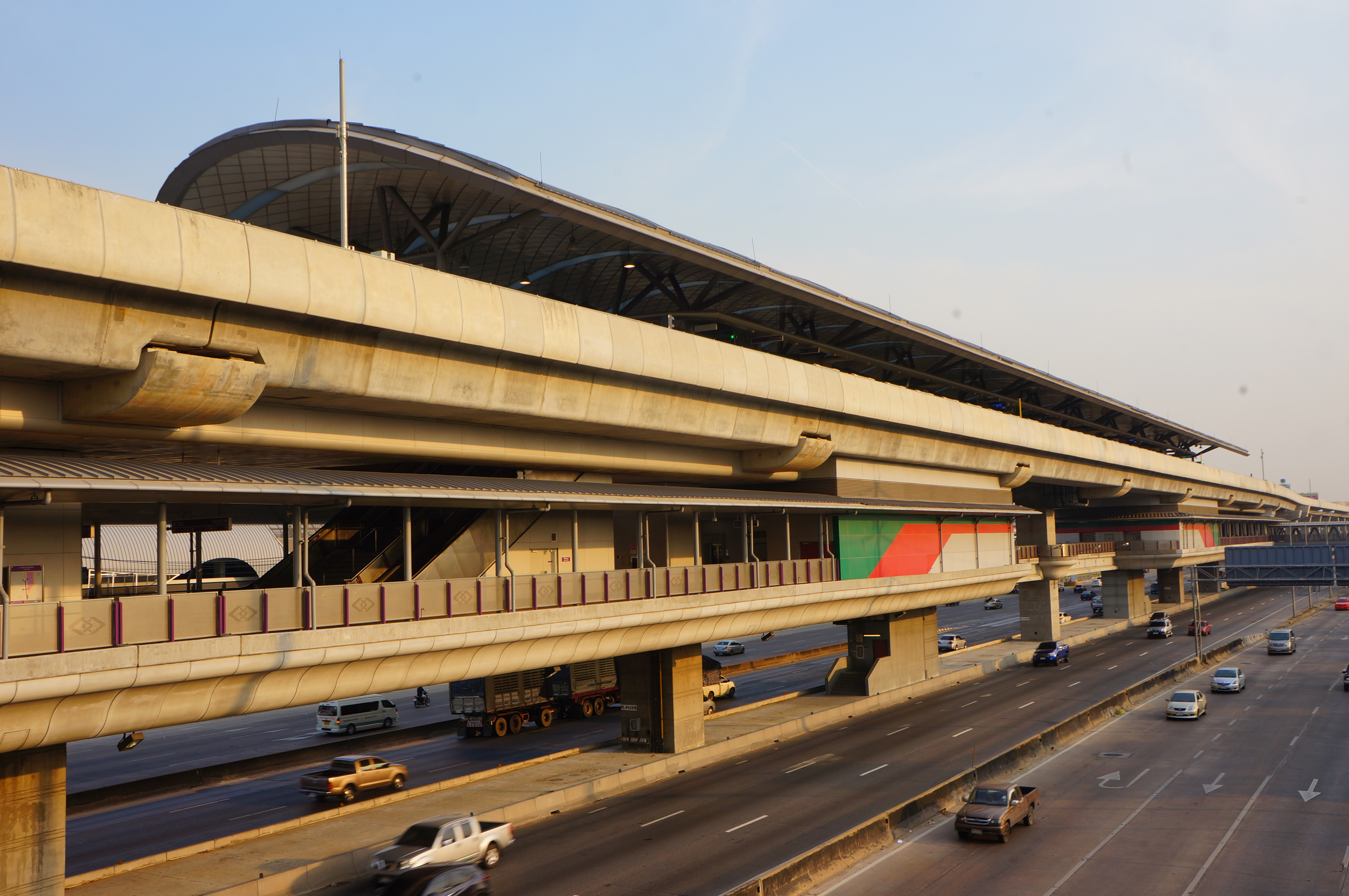

General information
- Location: Bang Rak Phatthana, Bang Bua Thong, Nonthaburi, Thailand
- Coordinates: 13°53′32.7″N 100°24′29.8″E
- System: | MRT
- Owner: Mass Rapid Transit Authority of Thailand
- Operator: Bangkok Expressway and Metro Public Company Limited
- Line: Purple Line
- Platforms: 2 (1 island platform)
- Tracks: 2
- Connections: Bus, Taxi

Construction
- Structure type: Elevated
- Parking: Available
- Cycle facilities: Available
- Accessible: yes

Other information
- Station code: PP01

History
- Opened: 6 August 2016; 10 years ago

Passengers
- 2021: 1,250,505

Services
Preceding station	Metropolitan Rapid Transit	Following station
Terminus	Purple Line	Talad Bang Yai towards Tao Poon
Location

Khlong Bang Phai station (Thai: สถานีคลองบางไผ่, pronounced [sā.tʰǎː.nīː kʰlɔ̄ːŋ bāːŋ pʰàj]) is the terminal station of the Bangkok MRT Purple Line. Located on Kanchanaphisek Road, Bang Bua Thong District, Nonthaburi Province. The MRT Purple Line Depot is located near here.

Khlong Bang Phai station (P1) is above the centre line of the Kanchanapisek road between Khlong Bang Phai and the Khlong Thanon area, south of the Chan Thong Lam road. The three-level station has a centre-platform, and is approximately 300 m (984 ft 3 in) long.

To its east is the Rattanawadi village, and the MRT Purple Line Depot, housing the main maintenance workshop, operations control centre, railway system operations, and a three-floor Park & Ride building. To the west the station serves commuters from the Bua Thong residential area. The Regency and Suphanan villages are here.

The station has four entrances from the Kanchanaphisek road at street level.

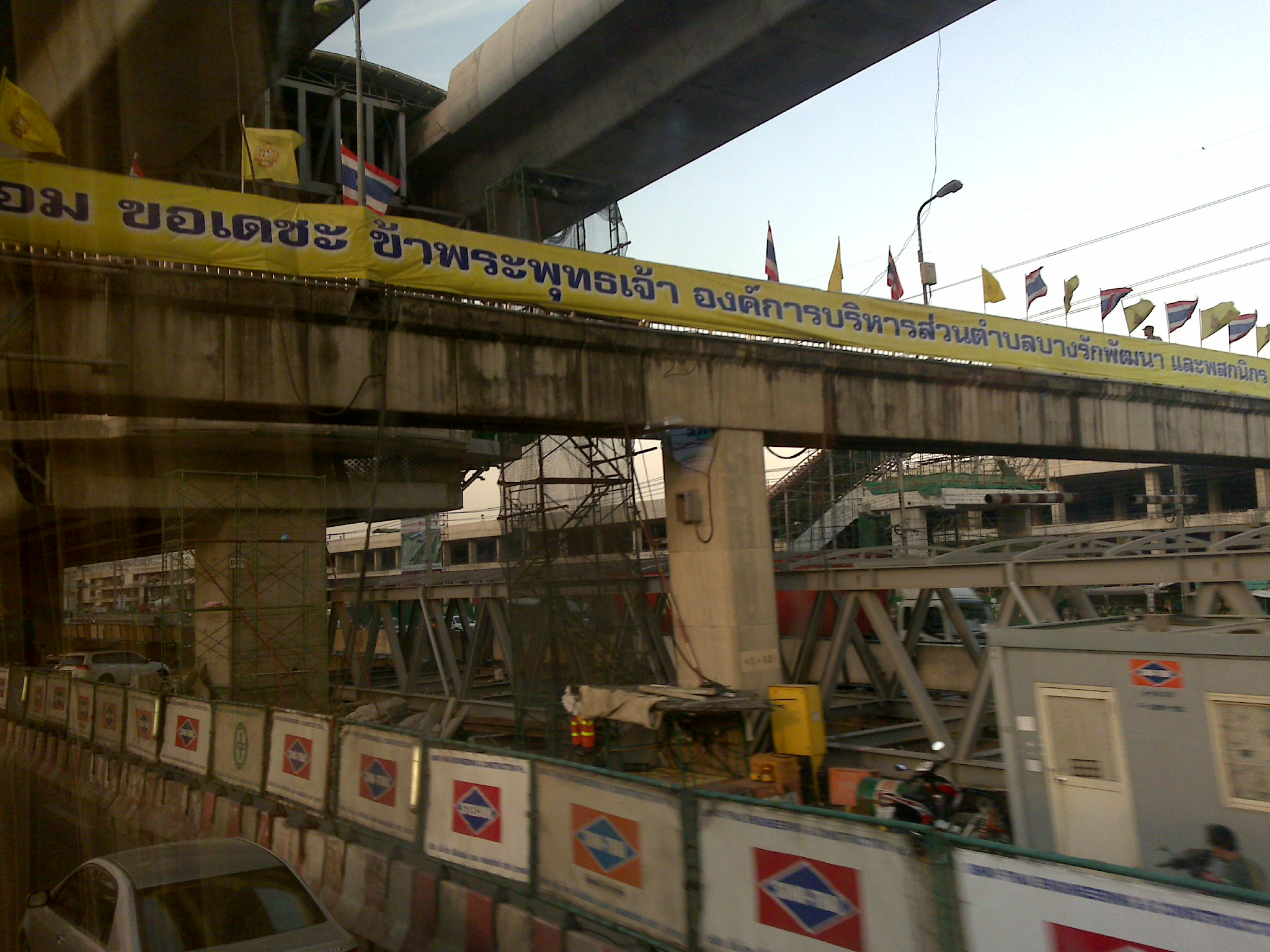
The station under construction in 2013

== Gallery ==
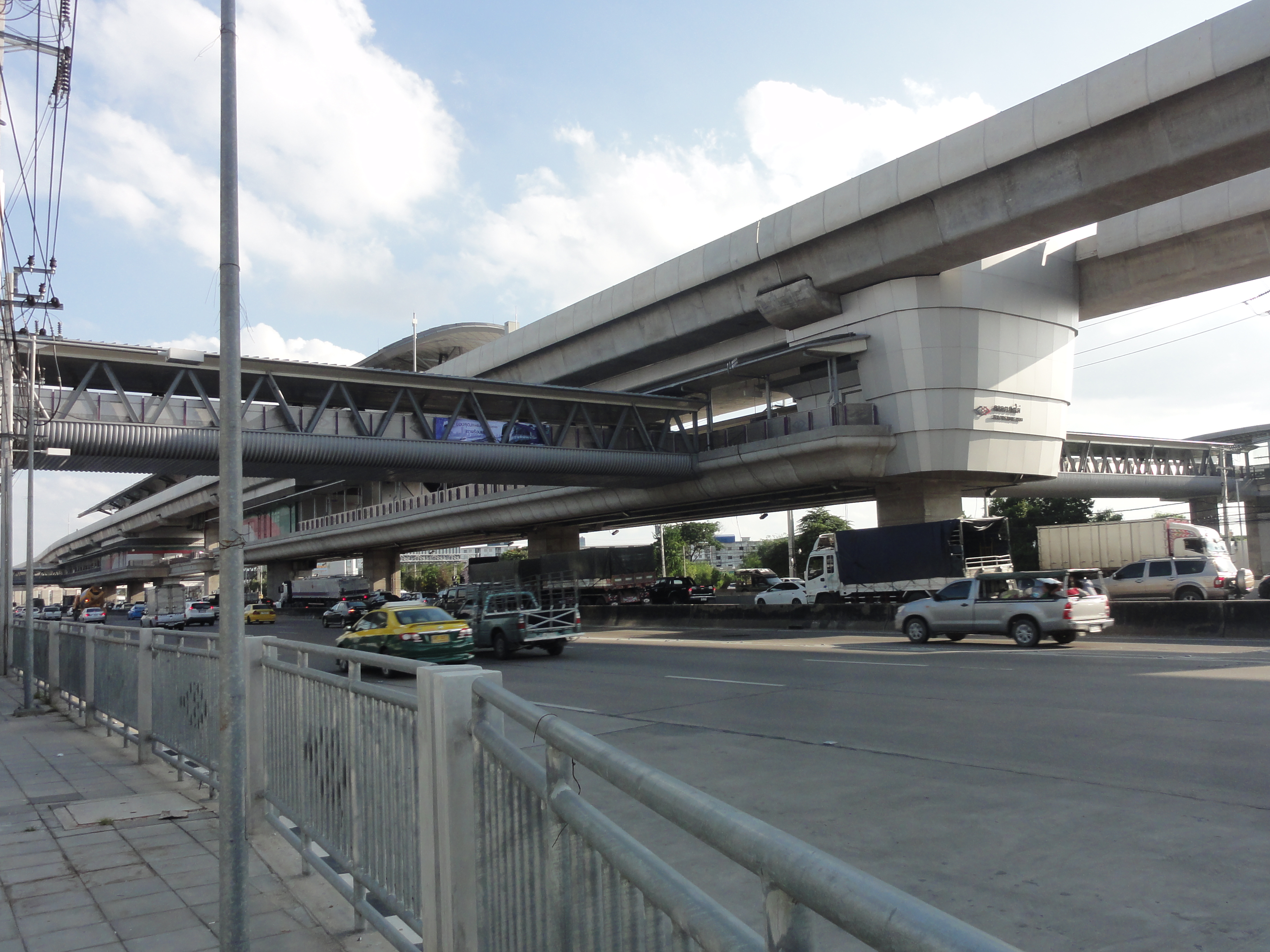
Outside of the station

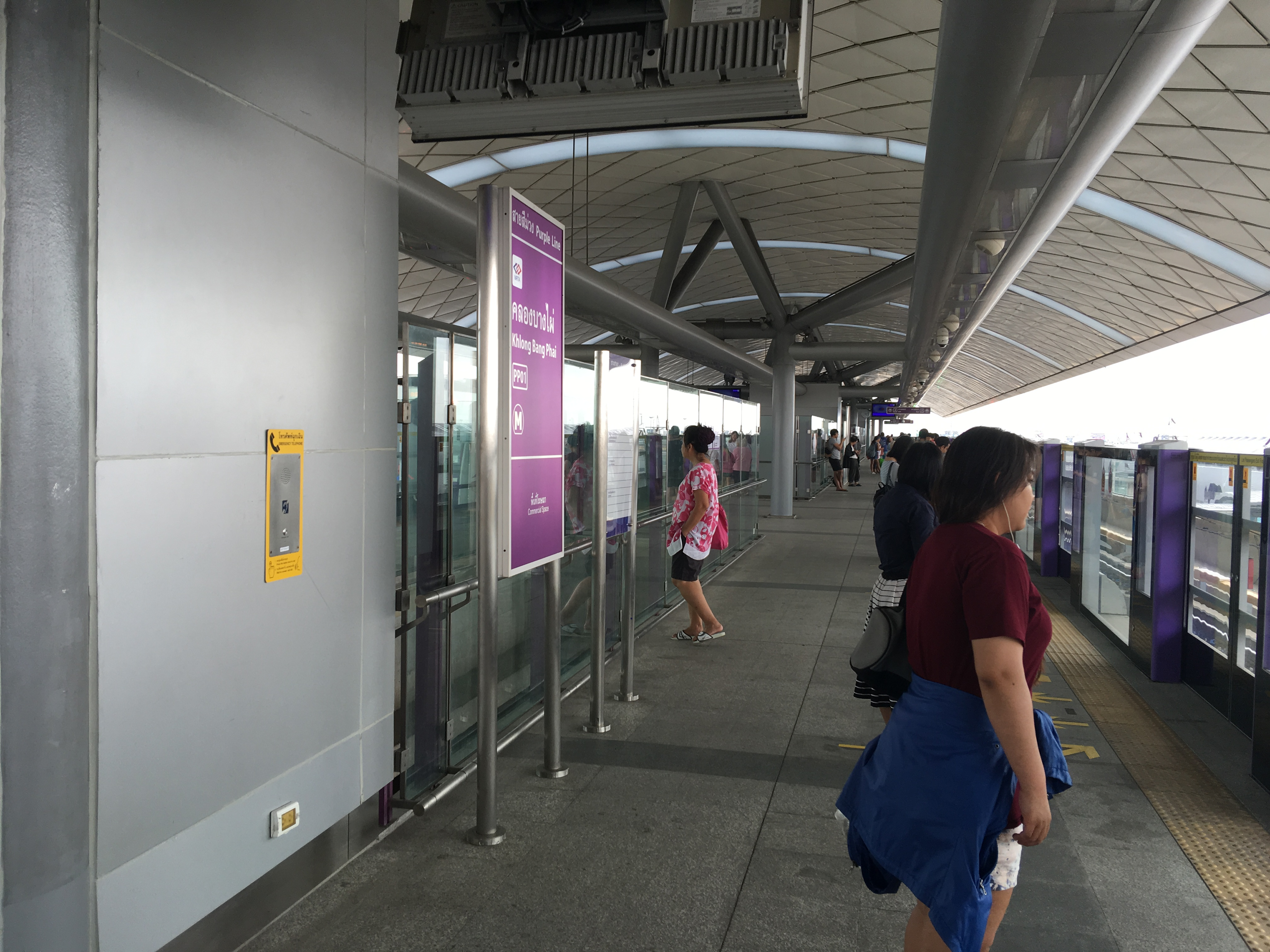
The platform

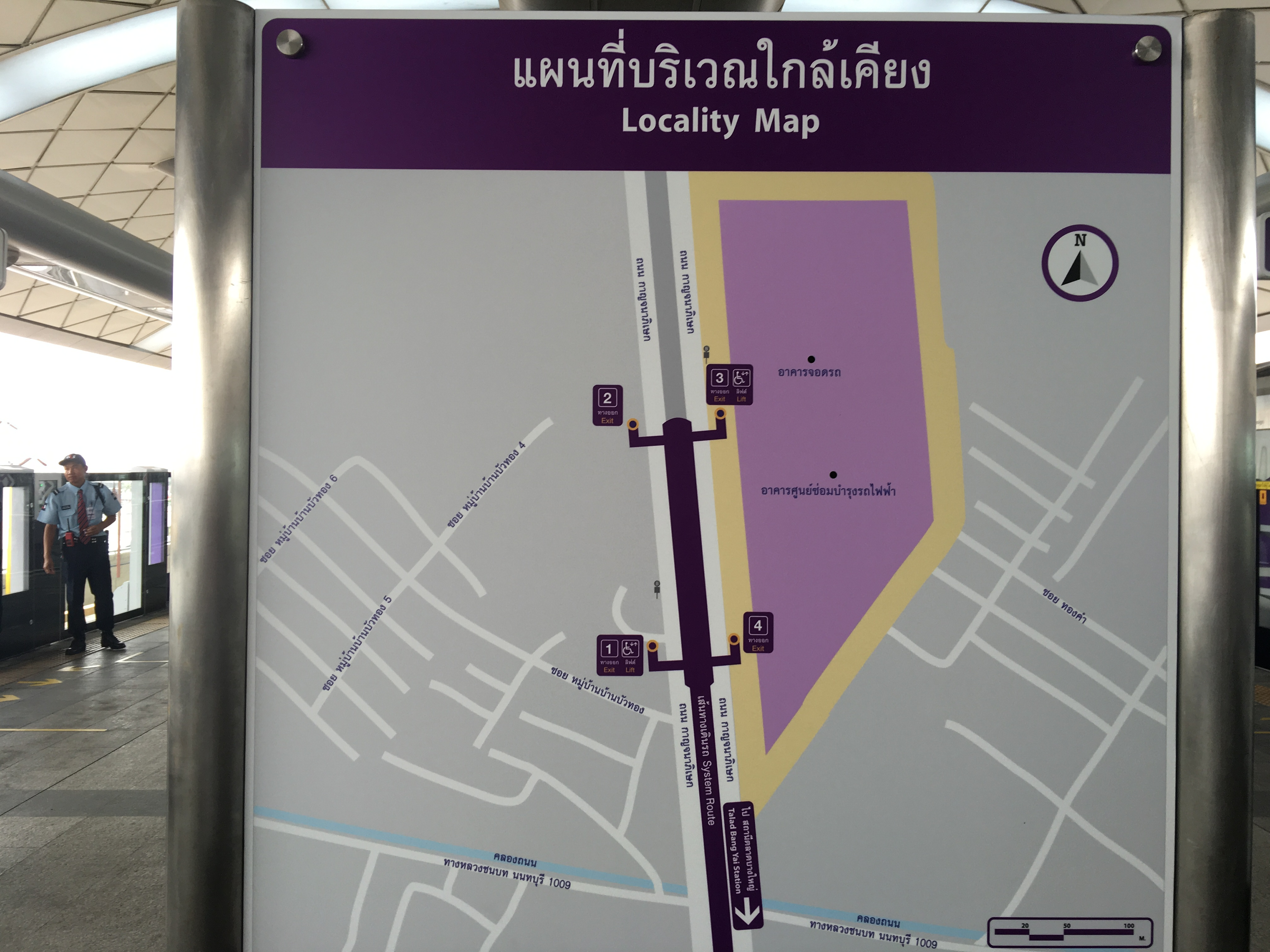
Locality map

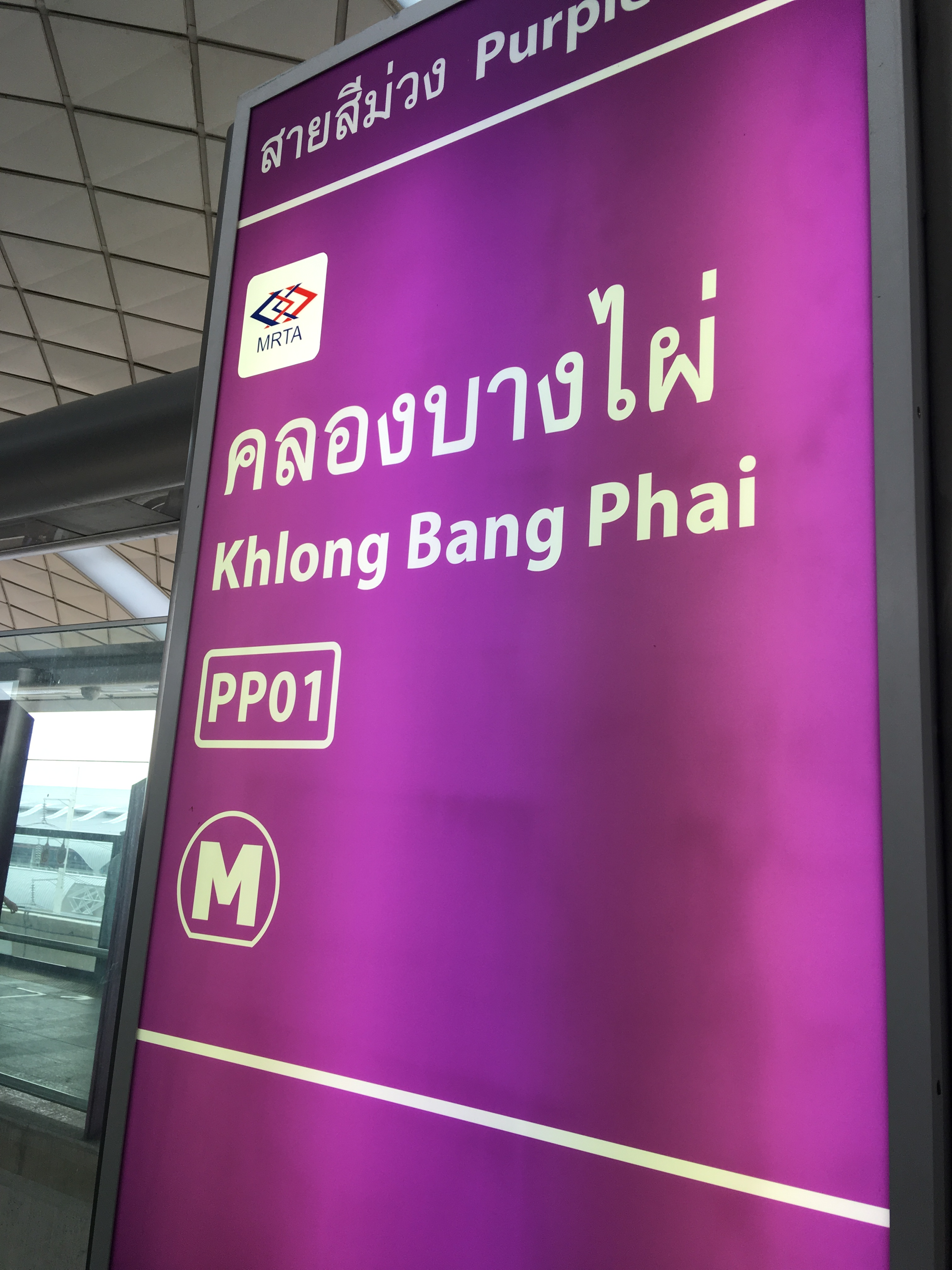
Name sign

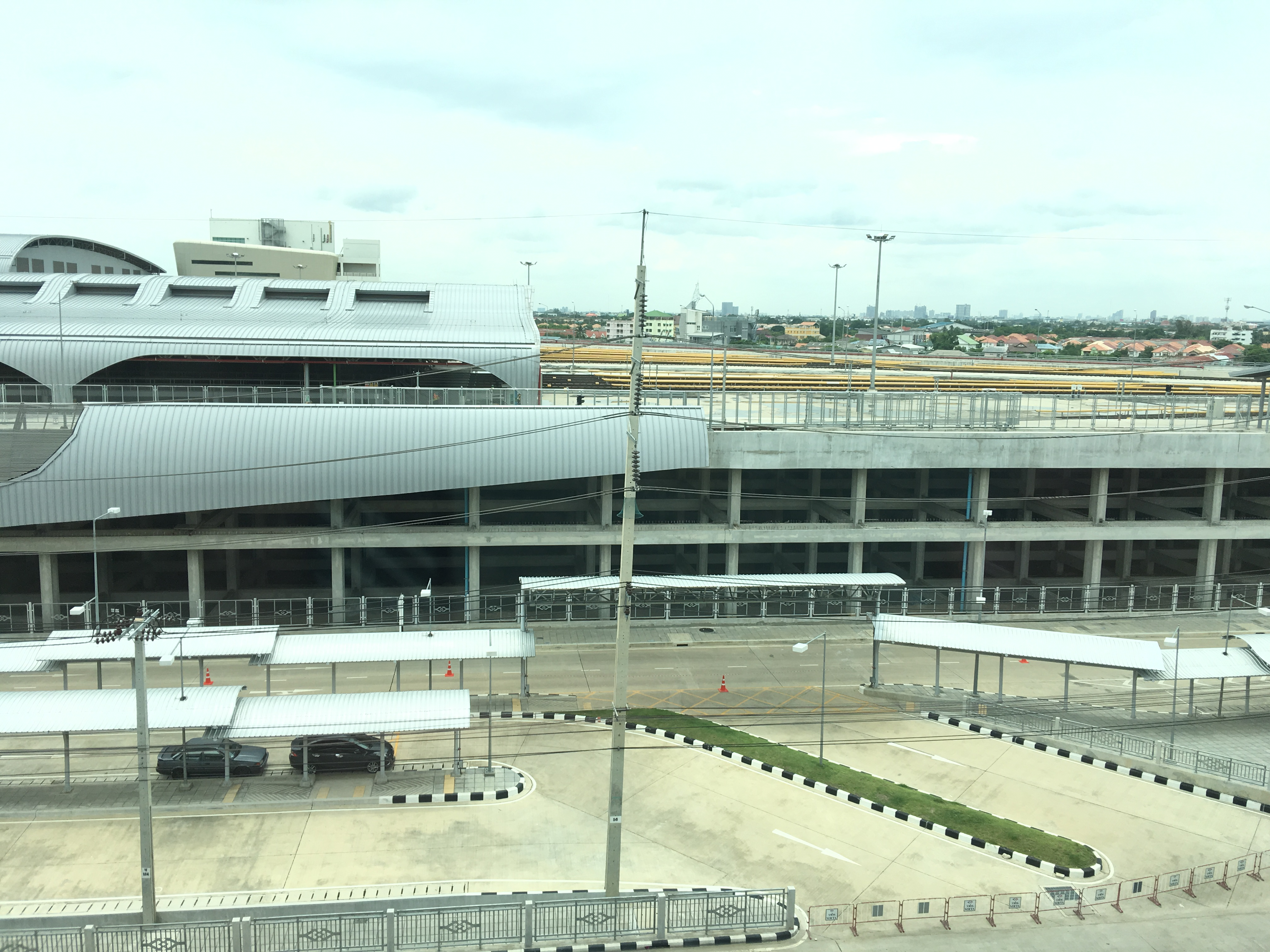
The depot and parking lot

Khlong Bang Phai Station Traditional sign
