= Tao Poon MRT station =

Railway station in Bangkok, Thailand

เตาปูน BL10 Tao Poon PP16
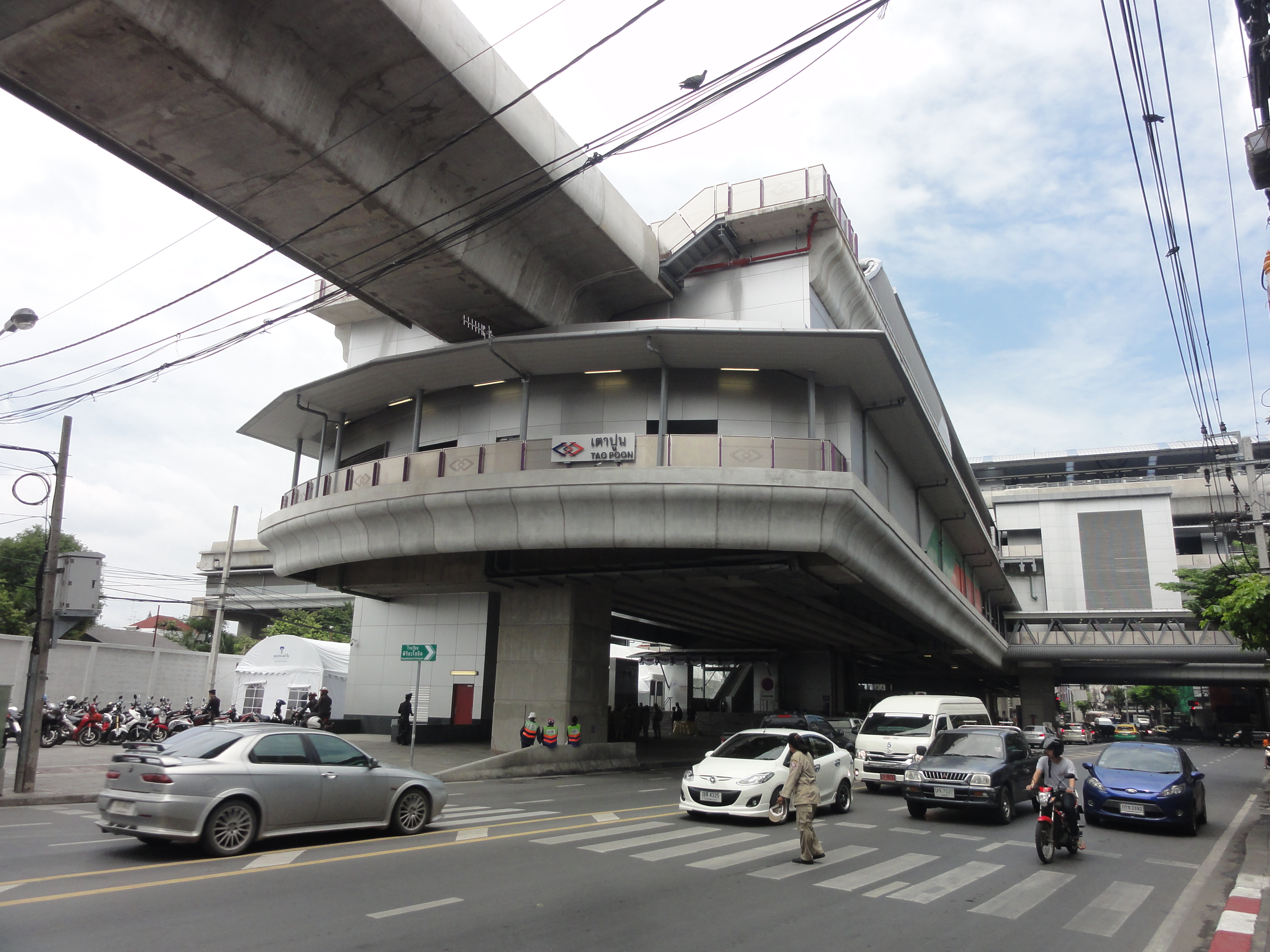
- Tao Poon station

General information
- Location: Bang Sue, Bangkok, Thailand
- Coordinates: 13°48′22.4″N 100°31′51.2″E
- System: | MRT MRT
- Owner: Mass Rapid Transit Authority of Thailand
- Operator: Bangkok Expressway and Metro Public Company Limited
- Lines: Blue Line; Purple Line
- Platforms: 4 (2 side platforms, 1 island platform)
- Tracks: 4
- Connections: Bus, Taxi

Construction
- Structure type: Elevated
- Parking: Not available
- Cycle facilities: Yes
- Accessible: yes

Other information
- Station code: BL10 PP16

History
- Opened: 6 August 2016; 10 years ago (Purple Line); 11 August 2017; 9 years ago (Blue Line)

Passengers
- 2021: 2,200,468

Services
| Preceding station | Metropolitan Rapid Transit | Following station |
|---|---|---|
| Bang Sue towards Lak Song | Blue Line | Bang Pho towards Tha Phra |
| Bang Son towards Khlong Bang Phai | Purple Line | Terminus |
Under construction
| Terminus | Purple Line Southern Extension | Parliament House towards Khru Nai |
Location

Tao Poon station (Thai: สถานีเตาปูน, RTGS: Sathani Tao Pun, pronounced [sā.tʰǎː.nīː tāw pūːn]) is a MRT station in Bangkok, located above Tao Poon Intersection in Bang Sue district, Bangkok. It is an interchange station of the Blue Line and Purple Line. The station was opened on 6 August 2016. While Tao Poon is currently the southern terminus of the Purple line, the construction is currently taking place to extend the line southward, with new stations planned to open in 2027.

== History ==
The station was opened on 6 August 2016, initially with only Purple line service and were not connected to the rest of Bangkok's rapid transit system due to construction delays and a contract dispute. This resulted in Prime Minister Prayut Chan-o-cha invoking the section 44 of the 2014 interim constitution of Thailand on 27 December 2016 to allow construction to proceed, and allowing BEM to operate Blue line service on this station. During that time, free shuttle bus service was provided, connecting Tao Poon station to a nearby Bang Sue MRT station.

The one-station Blue Line extension from Bang Sue to Tao Poon was opened on 11 August 2017, adding Blue Line service to the station and enabling direct transfers between the two lines. The station served as the terminal station of Blue line until 4 December 2019, when the Blue line service was extended from Tao Poon to Sirindhorn station.

== Station layout ==
U4
Purple Line platforms
Platform 3 and 4 (Island platforms)

Purple towards Khlong Bang Phai (Bang Son)

U3
Blue Line platforms

Side platform, doors will open on the left
Platform 1
Blue towards Lak Song (Bang Sue)
Platform 2
Blue towards Tha Phra (Bang Pho)
Side platform, doors will open on the left
U2
Concourse

ticket sales floor
Exit 1-3, Ticket Machines
Ground Floor
street level

-
Bus stop

== Future ==
The Purple Line is planned to be extended southward, from Tao Poon to Rat Burana. The extension has been approved by the cabinet in 2017. The bidding occurred during November 2021 and March 2022. Construction began in the third quarter of 2022. The extension was expected to be complete by the end of 2027. However a new report suggest that only a few stations can be opened in 2027. The opening date for the whole line also got delayed to 2030.

== Gallery ==
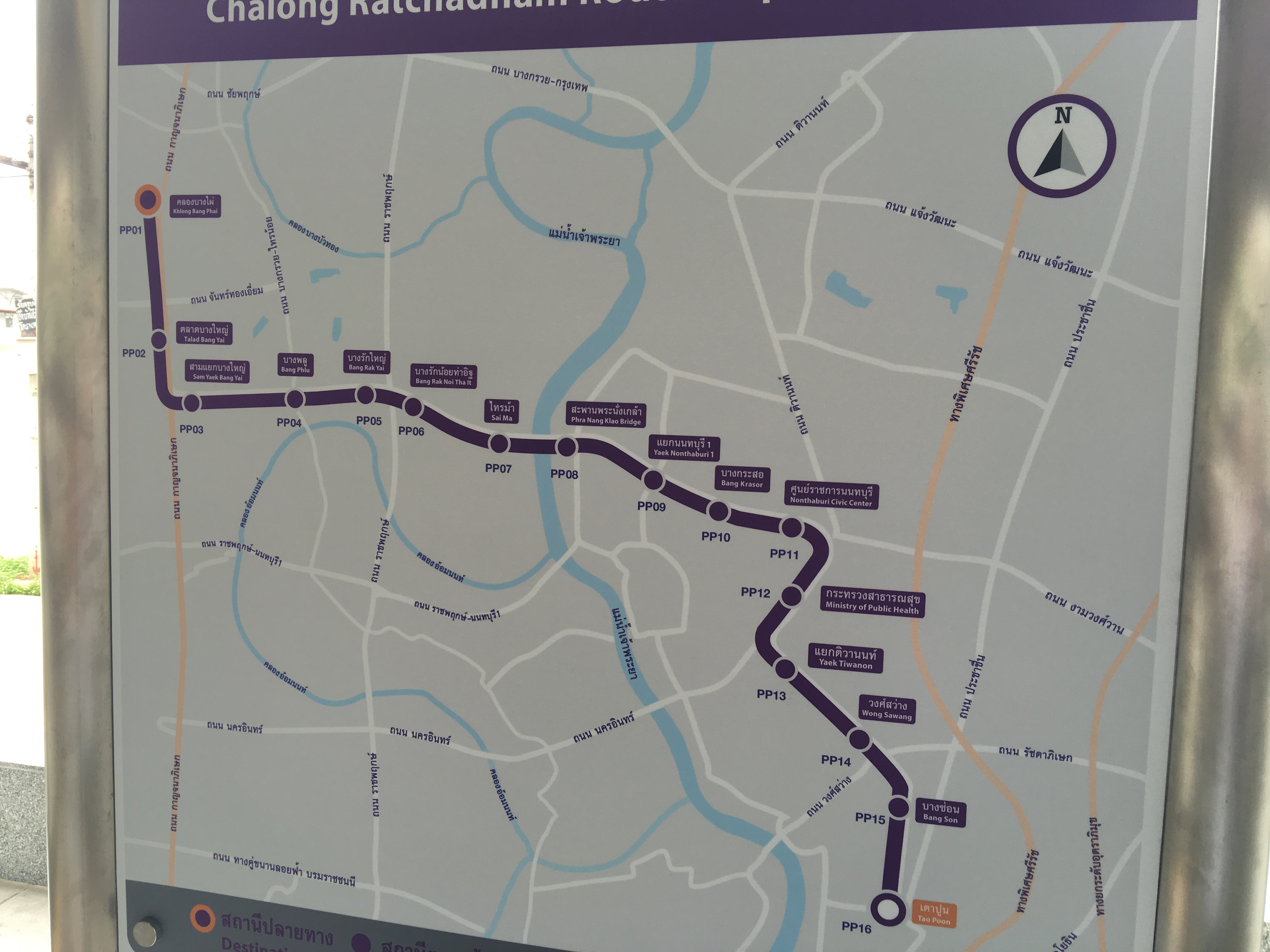
Route map of the MRT Purple line

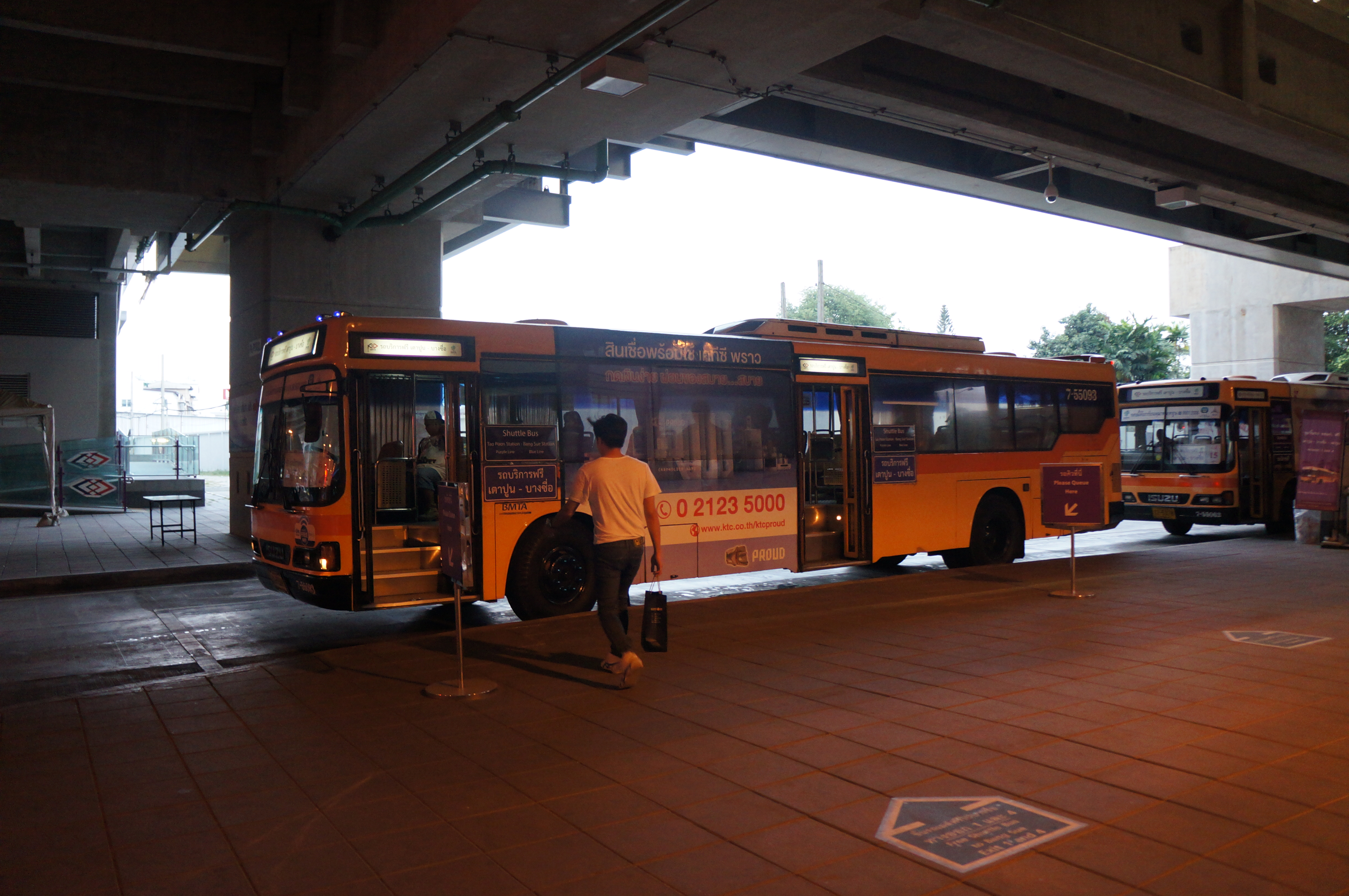
The shuttle bus connects to Bang Sue MRT station. Service discontinued after the opening of Blue Line extension from Bang Sue

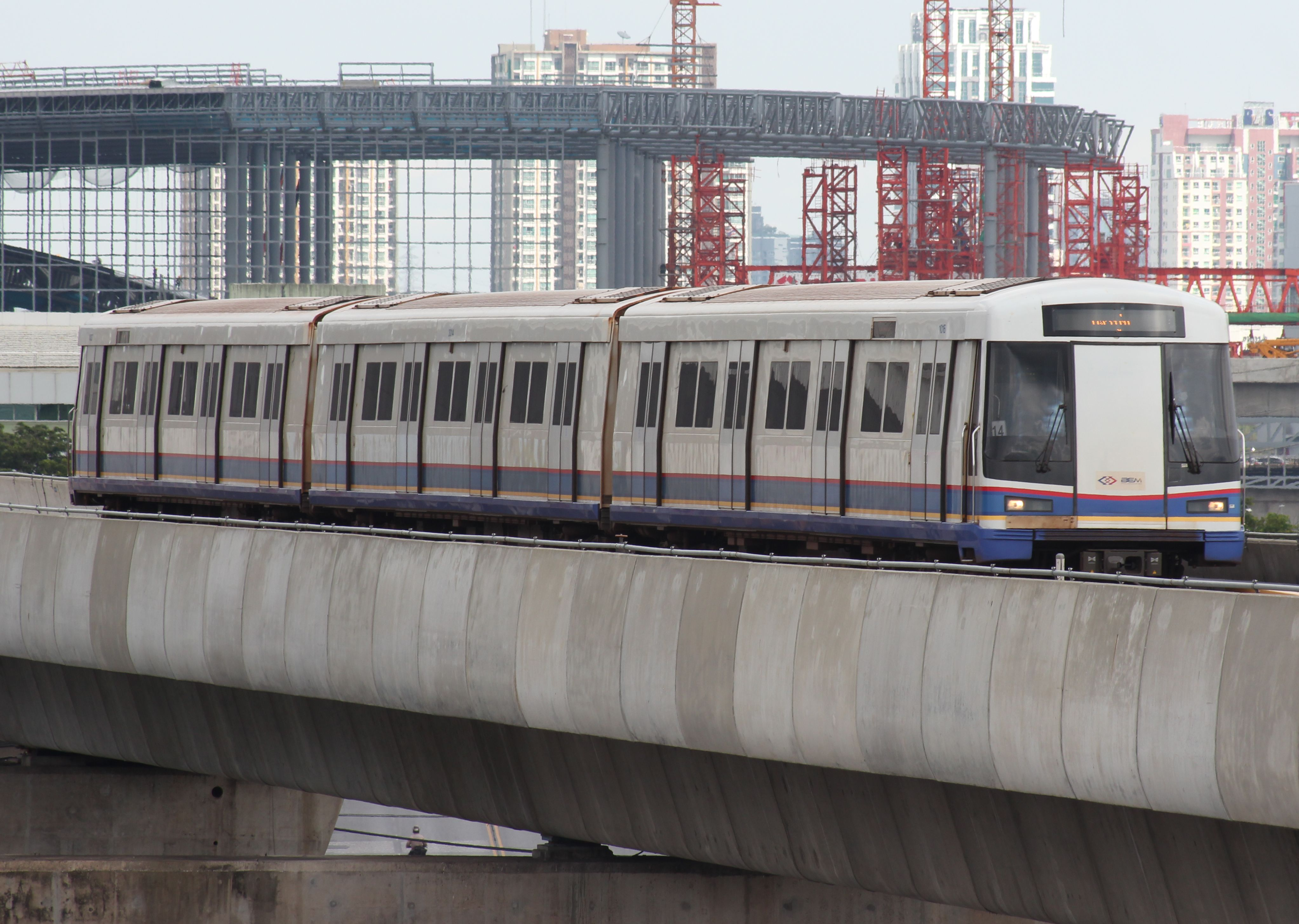
Blue Line train from Bang Sue approaching Tao Poon station

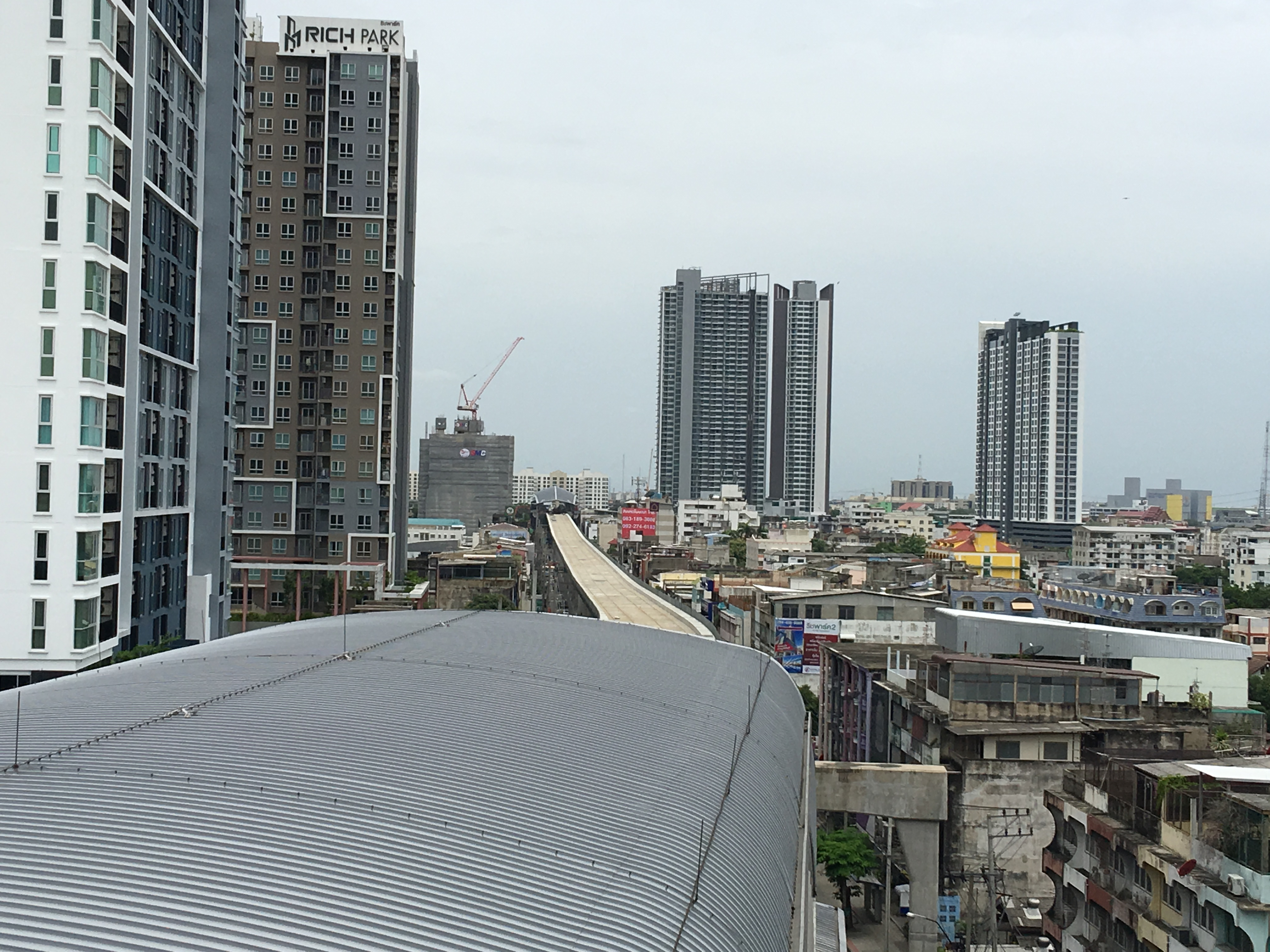
Blue line viaduct to Bang Pho under construction (Photo taken from Purple Line platform)

Tao Poon Station sign (Blue Line)

Tao Poon Station sign (Purple Line)

== See also ==
Other interchange stations in Bangkok with paid area integration.

- Krung Thep Aphiwat Central Terminal (Bang Sue Grand Station)
- Muang Thong Thani MRT station
- Siam BTS station
- Wat Phra Sri Mahathat station
