= Bangkok Expressway and Metro =

Public transportation company in Thailand

Bangkok Expressway and Metro Public Company Limited (BEM Plc.)
- Company type: Public
- Traded as: SET: BEM
- ISIN: TH6999010007
- Industry: Transportation
- Founded: 30 December 2015; 10 years ago
- Headquarters: Bangkok, Thailand
- Area served: Bangkok Metropolitan Region
- Key people: Veerapong Ramangkul(Chairman, CEO)
- Services: Mass transit; Media; Property; Services
- Parent: CH. Karnchang Public Company Limited
- Website: www.bemplc.co.th

Bangkok Expressway and Metro Public Company Limited or BEM (Thai: บริษัท ทางด่วนและรถไฟฟ้ากรุงเทพ จำกัด (มหาชน)) is a public transportation company in Thailand. It operates two metro lines in Bangkok and expressways.

It was formed by the merger of Bangkok Expressway Public Company Limited (“BECL”) and Bangkok Metro Public Company Limited (“BMCL”) on December 30, 2015.

Under 25-year concession agreements with the Mass Rapid Transit Authority of Thailand, BEM operates the MRT Blue Line, MRT Purple Line and is also set to operate the MRT Orange Line once it becomes operational. Additional BEM has won contracts to build or operate three expressways in Bangkok: the Si Rat expressway, Si Rat - Outer Ring Road Expressway and Udon Ratthaya Expressway.

BEM is listed on the Stock Exchange of Thailand and has a market value over THB 80,000 million.
