= Bang Son station =

Bang Son station may refer to:

- Bang Son railway station
- Bang Son MRT station
