= Rama VI Bridge =

Rama VI Bridge สะพานพระราม ๖
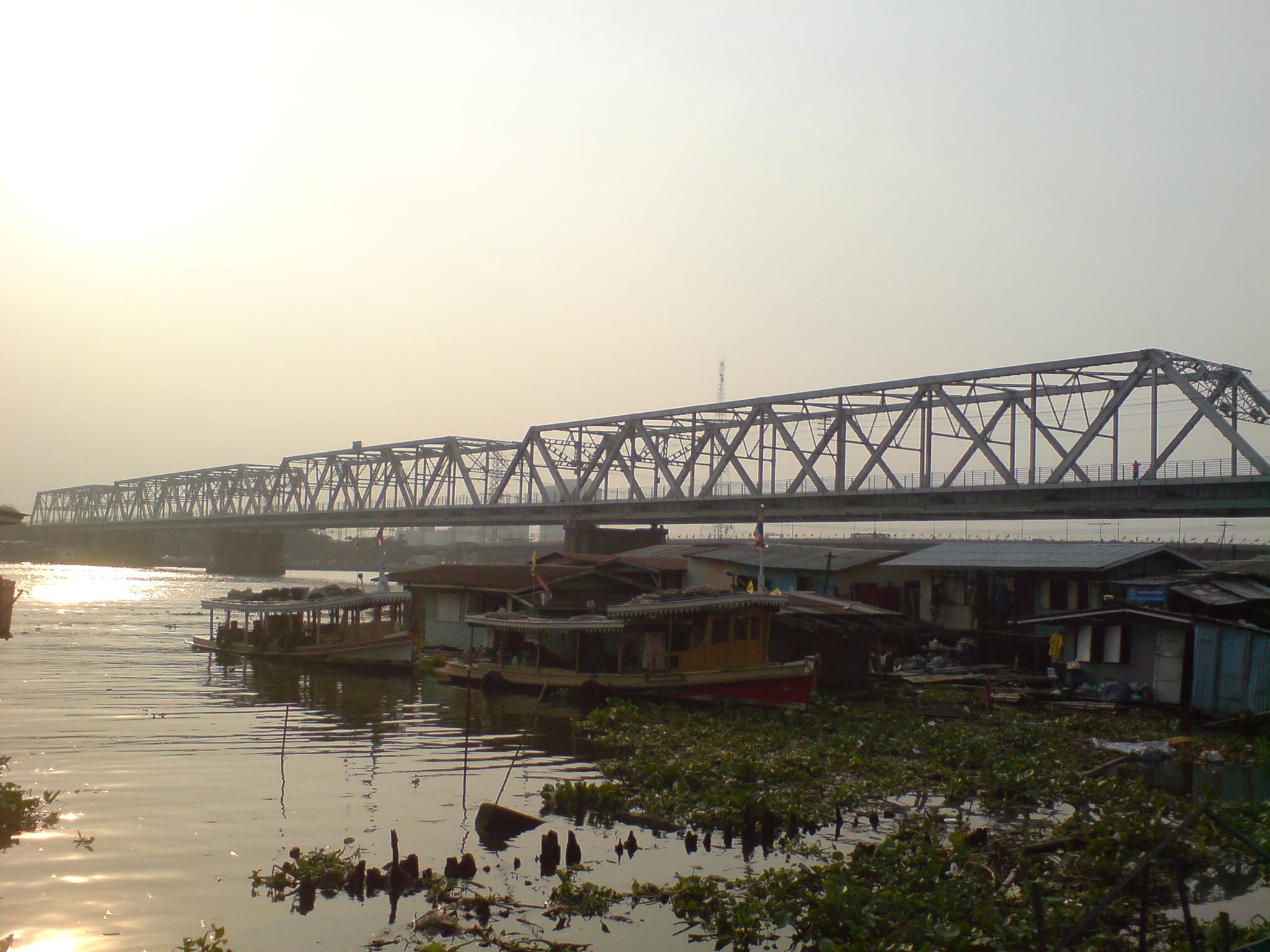
- View from east bank
- Coordinates: 13.813108°N 100.515826°E
- Carries: 2 Railway tracks, pedestrians
- Crosses: Chao Phraya River
- Locale: Bangkok, Thailand
- Official name: Saphan Phra Ram Hok

Characteristics
- Design: 5-span through-truss
- Total length: 441.44 metres
- Longest span: 120.00 metres

History
- Construction start: 1922
- Construction end: December 1926
- Opened: 1 January 1927

Location
- Interactive map of Rama VI Bridge

Rama VI Bridge (Thai: สะพานพระราม 6, RTGS: Saphan Phra Ram Hok, pronounced [sā.pʰāːn pʰráʔ rāːm hòk]) is a railway bridge over the Chao Phraya River in Bangkok, in Thailand, connecting the districts Bang Sue and Bang Phlat.

== History ==
It is the first bridge to cross the Chao Phraya River and was initially both a single-track railway and road (two lanes) bridge. Construction started in December 1922, during the reign of Vajiravudh to link the Northern Line with the Southern Line so the bridge was named after King Vajiravudh. Construction cost was 2,714,113.30 baht and It was officially opened on 1 January 1927.

The center of the bridge was torn on 7 February 1945, during World War II. It was repaired in 1950-1953 by Dorman Long and Christiani & Nielsen and was officially reopened on 12 December 1953. Following the opening of the adjacent Rama VII Bridge in 1992 due to increase in traffic volumes, cars were diverted from Rama VI bridge. Another railway track was laid in place of the road completed in 1999, making it a railway-only bridge.

== Location ==
The bridge is located 13 km from Bangkok railway station, between Bang Son railway station and Bang Bamru railway station. The bridge has 5 spans, all of the through-truss design: 77, 83, 120, 83 and 77 metres respectively, for a total length of 441 metres. It is thus the longest railway bridge in Thailand, almost 110 metres longer than its nearest rival, the 132 metre River Kwai bridge near Kanchanaburi.
