= Muan Bang clan =

Korean clan from South Jeolla Province

- Country: Korea
- Current region: Muan County
- Founder: Bang Po

Muan Bang clan (Korean: 무안 방씨; Hanja: 務安 邦氏) was one of the Korean clans. Their Bon-gwan was in Muan County, South Jeolla Province. According to the research in 2000, the number of Muan Bang clan was 331. Their founder was Bang Po who was from Shanxi and was a loyal of Zhu Yujian in Southern Ming, China.

== See also ==
- Korean clan names of foreign origin
