= Tao Pun (disambiguation) =

Tao Poon (Thai: เตาปูน, also spelled Tao Pun) is a neighbourhood in Bangkok.

Tao Poon or Tao Pun may also refer to these places in Thailand:

- Tao Poon MRT station, a rapid transit station in the aforementioned neighbourhood
- Tao Pun subdistrict in Song district, Phrae
- Tao Pun subdistrict in Photharam district, Ratchaburi
- Tao Pun subdistrict in Kaeng Khoi district, Saraburi
- Ko Tao Pun, an island in Ko Samui district, Surat Thani
