= Bang Sue subdistrict =

Bang Sue บางซื่อ
- Khwaeng
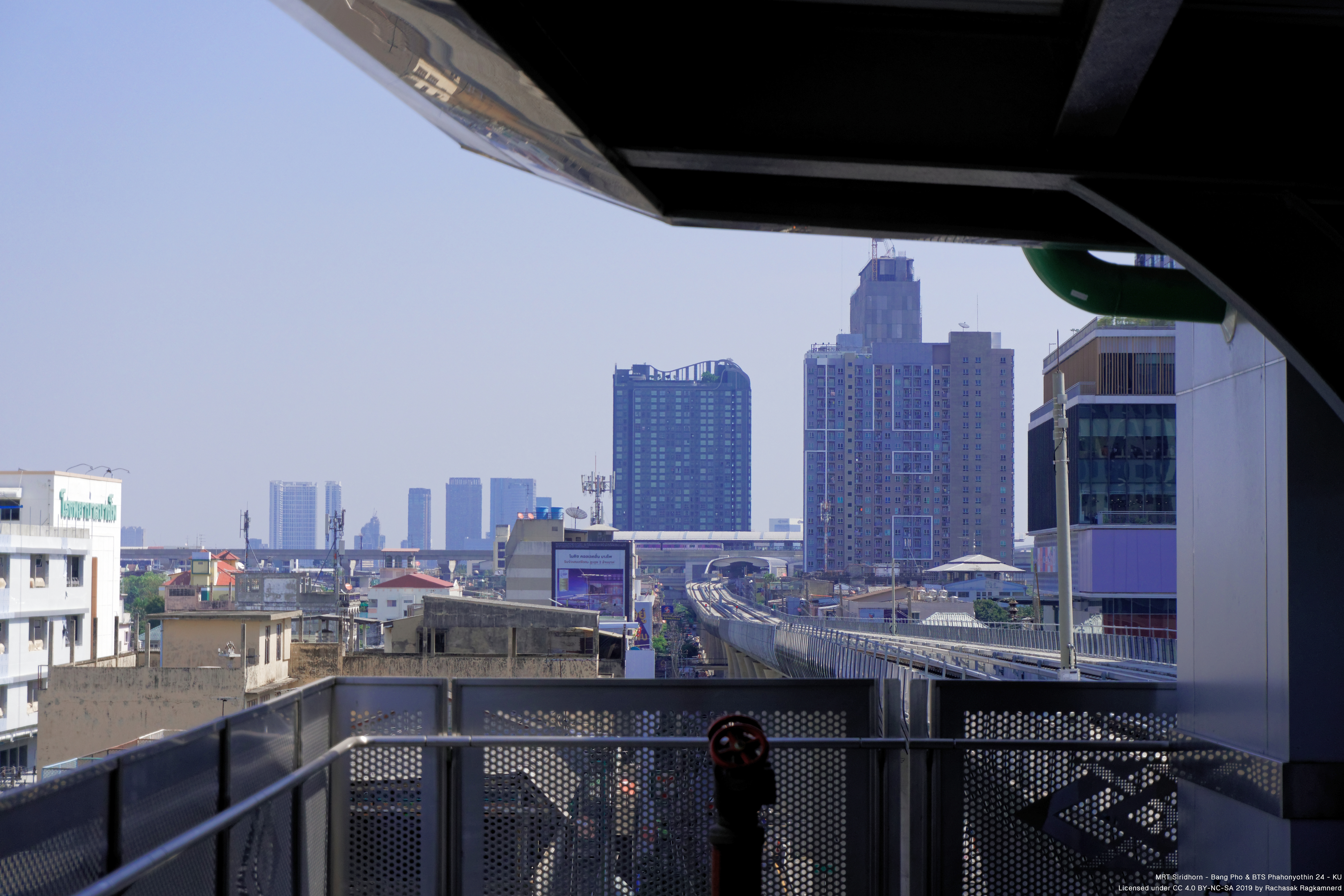
- View of Bang Sue (the area of Bang Pho toward Tao Poon) from Bang Pho MRT station

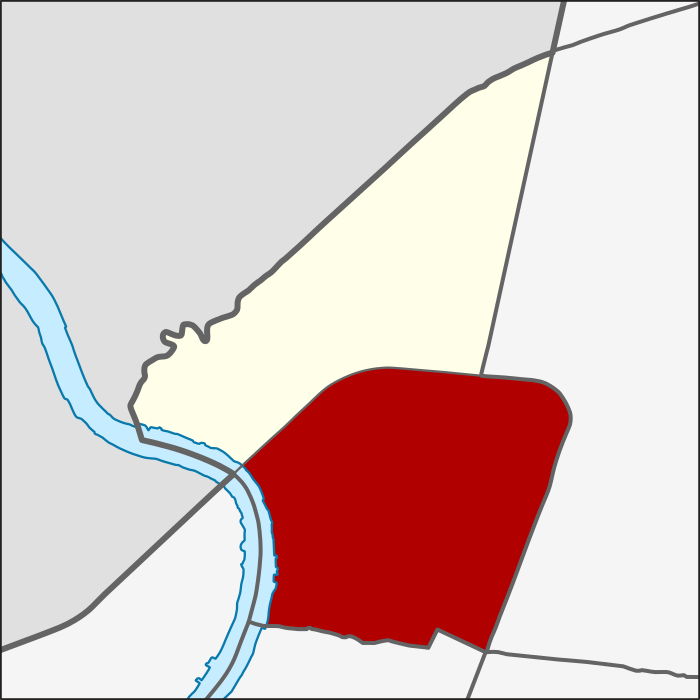
- Location in Bang Sue District
- Country: Thailand
- Province: Bangkok
- Khet: Bang Sue

Area
  - Total: 5.762 km^{2} (2.225 sq mi)

Population (2020)
  - Total: 79,405
- Time zone: UTC+7 (ICT)
- Postal code: 10800
- TIS 1099: 102901

Bang Sue (Thai: บางซื่อ, pronounced [bāːŋ sɯ̂ː]) is a khwaeng (subdistrict) of Bang Sue District, in Bangkok, Thailand. In 2020, it had a total population of 79,405 people.

== Geography ==
Bang Sue is the southern part of the district. The west bank is all connected to the Chao Phraya River. It borders Wong Sawang to the north (Southern Railway Line is a borderline), Chatuchak to the east (Khlong Prapa is a borderline), Thanon Nakhon Chai Si to the south (Khlong Bang Sue is a borderline), Bang O (across the Chao Phraya River) to the west.
