= Bang Son railway station =

Railway station in Bangkok, Thailand

Bang Son บางซ่อน
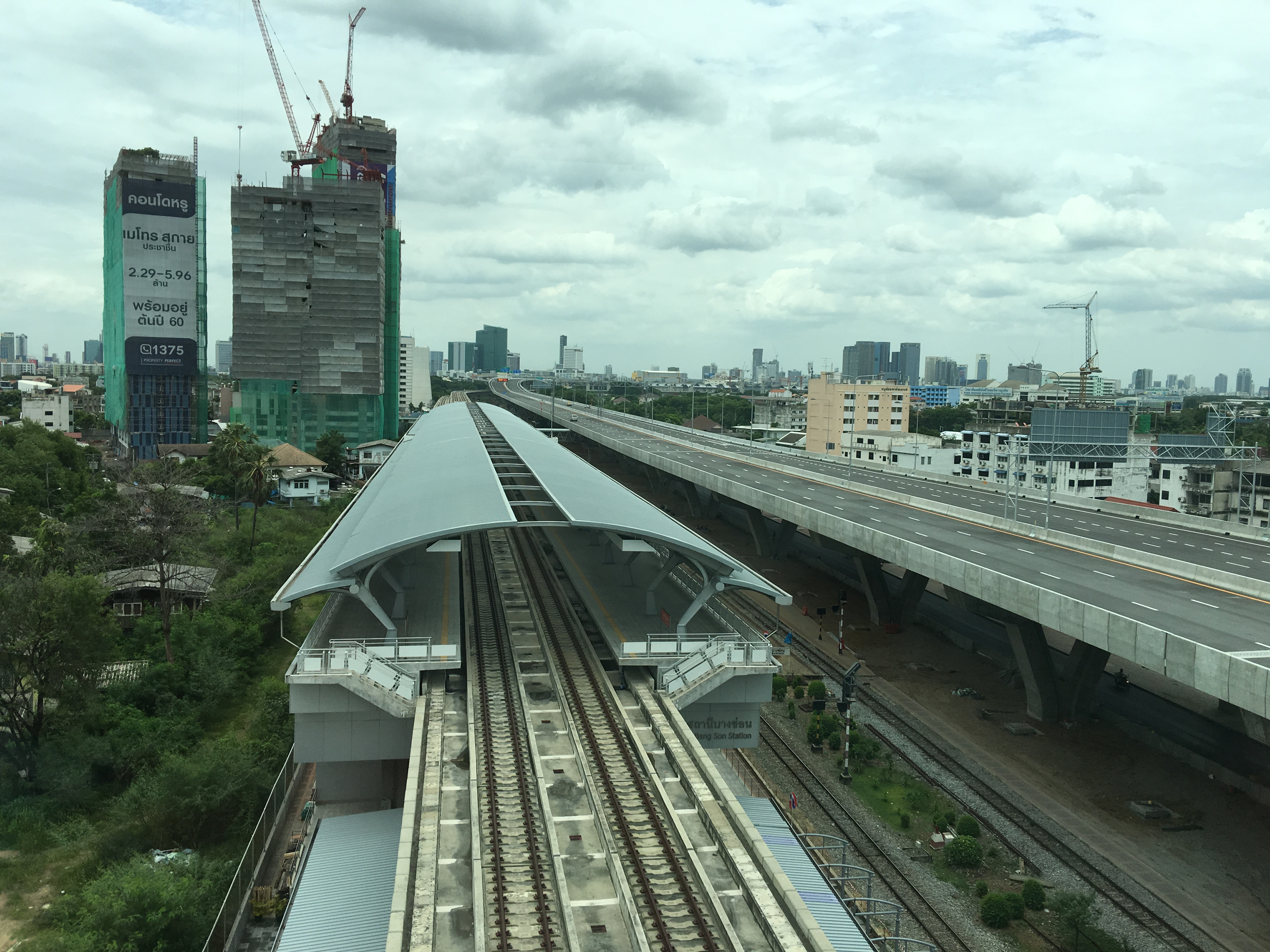

General information
- Location: Bangkok-Nonthaburi Road, Bang Sue Subdistrict, Bang Sue; Bangkok; Thailand
- Coordinates: 13.8221°N 100.5342°E
- Operator: State Railway of Thailand
- Distance: 12.907 km (8.0 mi) from Hua Lamphong
- Platforms: 2 (Elevated); 2 (At-grade)
- Tracks: 2 (Elevated); 2 (At-grade)

Construction
- Structure type: Elevated (SRT Red Lines); At-grade (SRT Inter-city)
- Platform levels: 2
- Accessible: Yes

Other information
- Station code: ซอ., RW02
- Classification: Halt

History
- Rebuilt: September 2009; 16 years ago
- Electrified: 25 kV AC overhead line

Services
Preceding station	State Railway of Thailand	Following station
Bang Sue Junction towards Hua Lamphong	Southern Line	Bang Bamru towards Su-ngai Kolok
Preceding station	SRT Red Lines	Following station
Krung Thep Aphiwat Terminus	Light Red Line	Bang Bamru towards Taling Chan
Location

Bang Son station (Thai: สถานีบางซ่อน) is a railway station located in Bang Sue subdistrict, Bang Sue district, Bangkok. It is located 12.907 km (8.0 mi) from Bangkok Railway Station. Passengers can transfer to the Bang Son MRT station. Bang Son station serves two systems operated by the State Railway of Thailand, the Southern Line at the at-grade railway halt and the Bang Son–Taling Chan SRT Light Red Line at the elevated station.
