= Bang Pho =

Neighborhood in Bangkok

Coordinates: 13.809222°N 100.522028°E

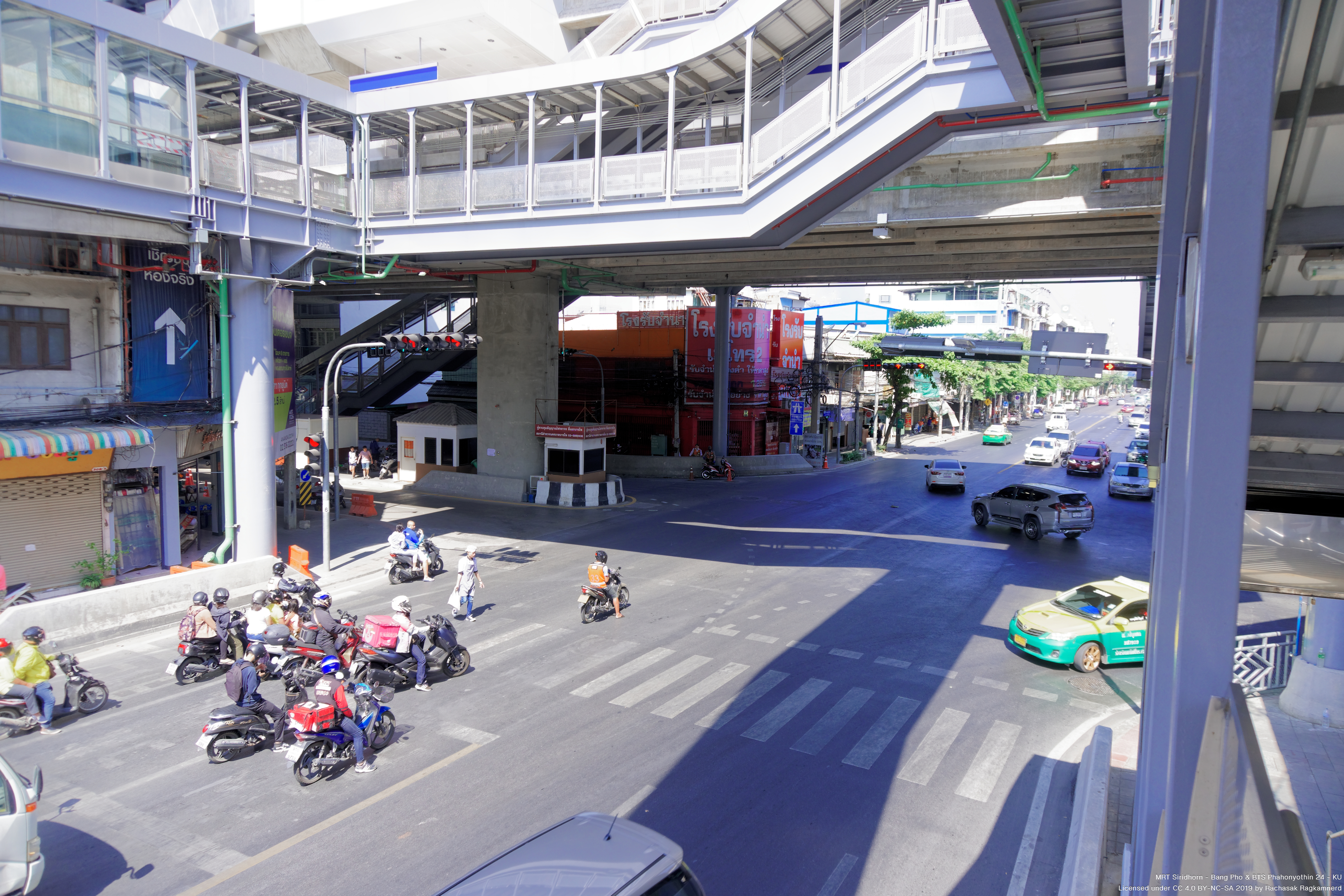
Bang Pho MRT station and the namesake four-way intersection

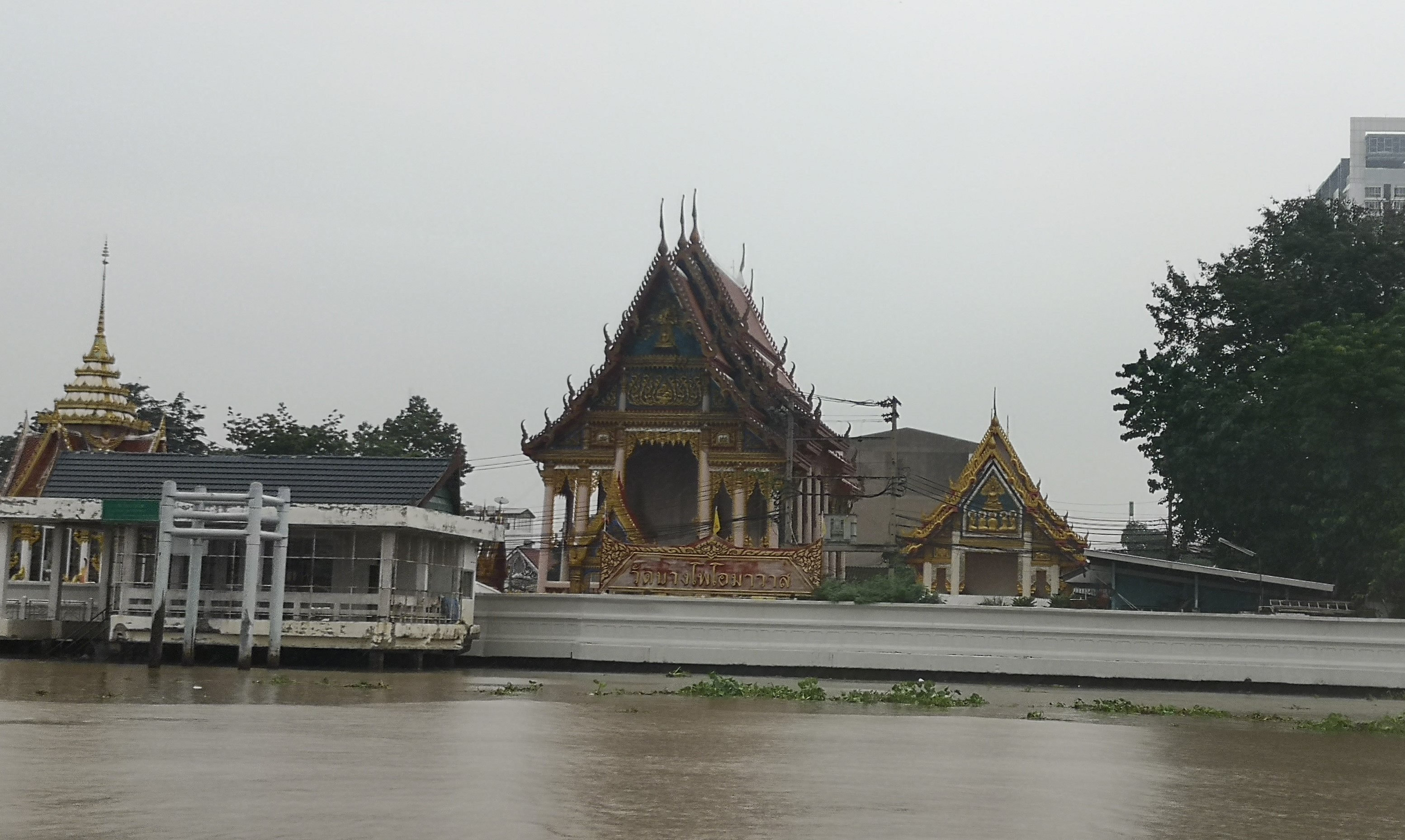
Wat Bang Pho Omawat (popularly called for short "Wat Bang Pho") viewed from the Chao Phraya river and the large sacred fig is on the rightmost

Bang Pho (Thai: บางโพ, pronounced [bāːŋ pʰōː]) is a neighbourhood in Bangkok. It roughly occupies the area of the sub-district of Bang Sue in Bang Sue district, and four-way intersection in the same name. Well known as centre for various types of wood products, especially on Sai Mai road. Nowadays, the surrounding neighbourhood is also studded with many condominiums.

== Geography ==
Bang Pho is lower part of Bang Sue in the area adjacent to the eastern bank of the Chao Phraya river. It borders another neighbourhood, Tao Poon to the east.

For the road junction, Bang Pho is four-way intersection, where Pracha Rat Sai Nueng road cuts across Pracha Rat Sai Song road. Both are roads built in 1935.

== History ==
=== Early period and toponymy ===
Bang Pho has a long history matching the planting of Bangkok. The first group of immigrants to settle here were the Annamese (Vietnamese) from southern Vietnam, around Saigon (present-day Ho Chi Minh City). In the early Rattanakosin era corresponds to the King Rama I's reign, Nguyễn Ánh who escaped to live in Bangkok had escaped again. Therefore, relatives who traveled from Laos came to look for them. The king therefore decided that these two Annamese families should settle and live in a place far from the sea so that they would not escape again, that was Bang Pho.

In those days, there were houses and people living along the waterways. On the inlands, was mostly orchards. These Annamese had the ability to be carpenters and catch aquatic animals, such as shrimp or fish for a living. Bang Pho was mentioned in Nirat Phu Khao Thong (นิราศภูเขาทอง, "journey to golden mount"), the travelogue of the famed poet Sunthon Phu. In the literature described the Annamese in Bang Pho had a career selling shrimp and fish. Evidence that once Annamese lived here is a Wat Anam Nikayaram (formerly and still colloquially known as Wat Yuan (Note: "Yuan" is a Thai word used to refer to Annamese (currently known as Vietnamese) in the past.)), an Annamese Buddhist temple near Bang Pho intersection today.

The name "Bang Pho" literally translates to "sacred fig (Note: Referring to the Bodhi tree.) waterside hamlet" is assumed to have gotten this name from Wat Bang Pho Omawat, a local Thai Buddhist monastery. In the temple compound adjacent to Bang Pho police station and the Chao Phraya river at present. A large sacred fig appeared.

=== Wood trading centre ===
For woodworking, there is historical evidence indicating that Annamese were the main workers in assembling the sailing ships of the nobles, upper class, and merchants during the King Rama III's reign.

For wood carving, Annamese sculptors were considered one of the 10 royal craftsmen of the royal court. In the King Rama V's reign, he granted them government service and bestowed titles.

Moreover, during the time before that, the Golden Mount of Wat Saket has collapsed. Therefore there was a major restoration by strengthening the base using a method of stacking logs into rafts. Including the construction of the Phra Prang (a type of pagoda) and the twelve wooden recess bases. All such work began in the King Rama III's reign and was completed in the King Rama IV's reign.

The need to use a large amount of logs. Moreover, processed wood and wood carving requires Chinese craftsmen, especially Hainanese, as main workers. Because the restoration took a long time, this resulted in a community of carpenters and the sawmills in the area around the monastery and nearby canals, namely Khlong Rop Krung and Khlong Maha Nak. Causing it to continue to be a timber trading district until the present.

In 1957, a large fire caused extensive damage to buildings and sawmills. The Bangkok Municipality (present-day Bangkok Metropolitan Administration) had a measure prohibiting the establishment of factories in residential areas. As a result, businesses related to woodworking in particular, privatization must be moved to another location, Bang Pho was one of them.

== Wood street ==
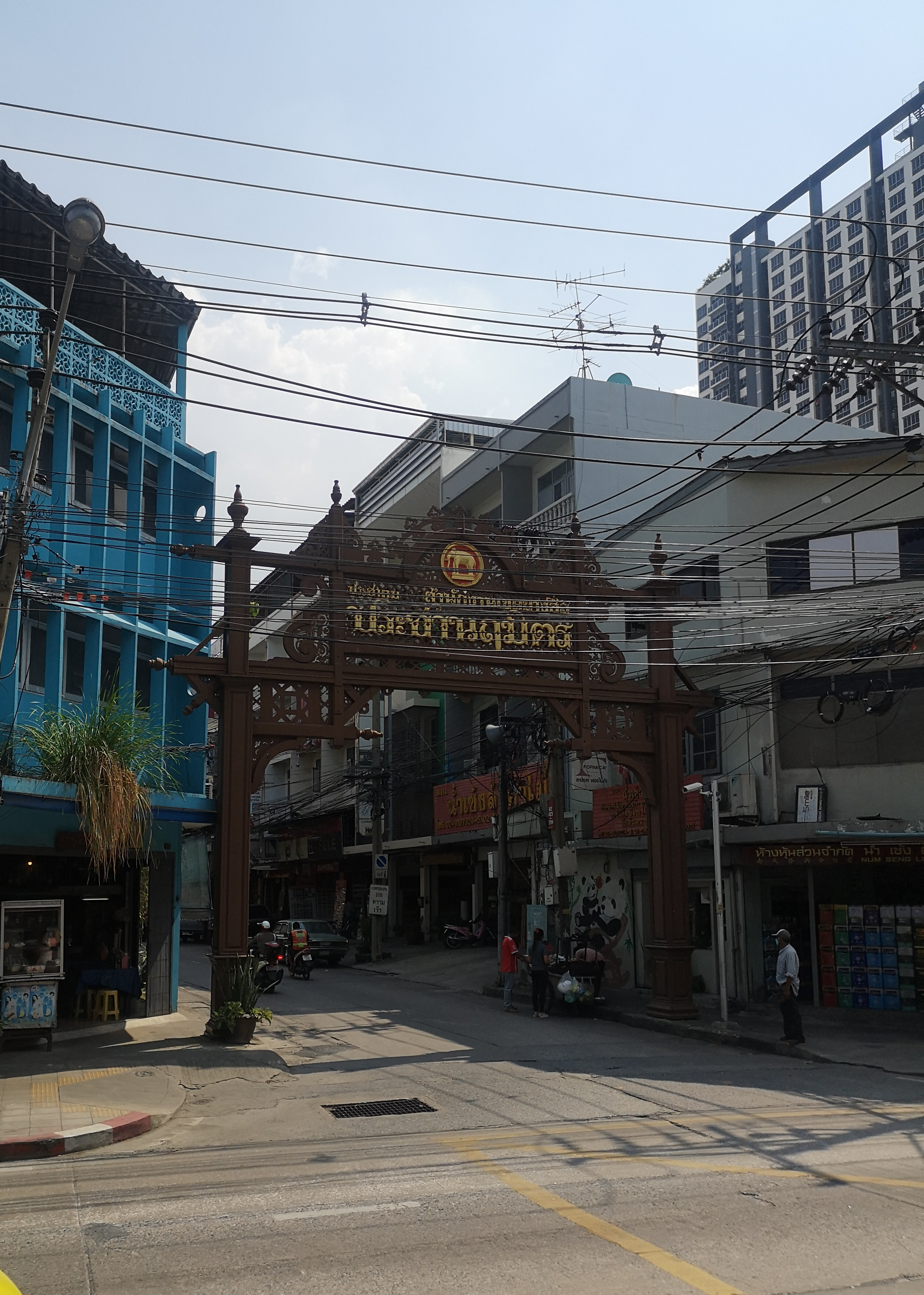
The entrance arch of the wood street on Pracha Rat Sai Nueng side

Sai Mai road (ถนนสายไม้, pronounced [tʰānǒn sǎːj máːj], "wood street") is unofficial name of Soi (alley) Pracha Naruemit, a short (1.1 km (0.7 mi)) street, with over 200 woodwork shops along both sides of the alley. It offers from small decoration pieces to large furniture.

The wood street is a side-street (soi) branching off Pracha Rat Sai Nueng road (Pracha Rat Sai Nueng Soi 26) and connects to Krung Thep-Nonthaburi road (Krung Thep-Nonthaburi Soi 5).

Its history began alongside the timber trading business of Bang Pho, as part of this neighbourhood. The big changes came in 1979 when skilled carpenters from the quarters of Wat Yuan, Saphan Khao, Damrong Rak road, Saphan Dam, Bang Lamphu and Wat Saket moved to settle here.

As a result, Bang Pho had become a larger wood trading centre. Most of the entrepreneurs descended from Annamese immigrants at that time, integrated with Hainanese carpenters, and there were also carpenters from other provinces in the central region who come to live with them as well.

At present, the wood street has expanded into nearby area, namely Pracha Rat Sai Nueng Soi 28 (Soi Sawai Suwan) or Krung Thep-Nonthaburi Soi 13, which is known as "Sai Mai road II" or "New Sai Mai road".

Its landmark is the ornately carved wooden arch that was constructed in 1997 and is present at both the entrance and exit of the street.

== Transportation ==
The neighbourhood is crossed by the Blue Line of the Bangkok MRT with Bang Pho MRT station (BL09). The station is located above Bang Pho intersection, and can also be connected to the Chao Phraya Express Boat by Bang Pho Pier (N22).

== Popular culture ==
Bang Pho is the setting of a Thai disco song, titled 'Sao Bang Pho' (สาวบางโพ, "Bang Pho girl"). It was sung by Direk Amatayakul in the year 1982, bringing the area became more widely known.

== See also ==
- List of neighbourhoods in Bangkok
