= Light Red Line (Bangkok) =

Mass rapid rail in Thailand

SRT Light Red Line

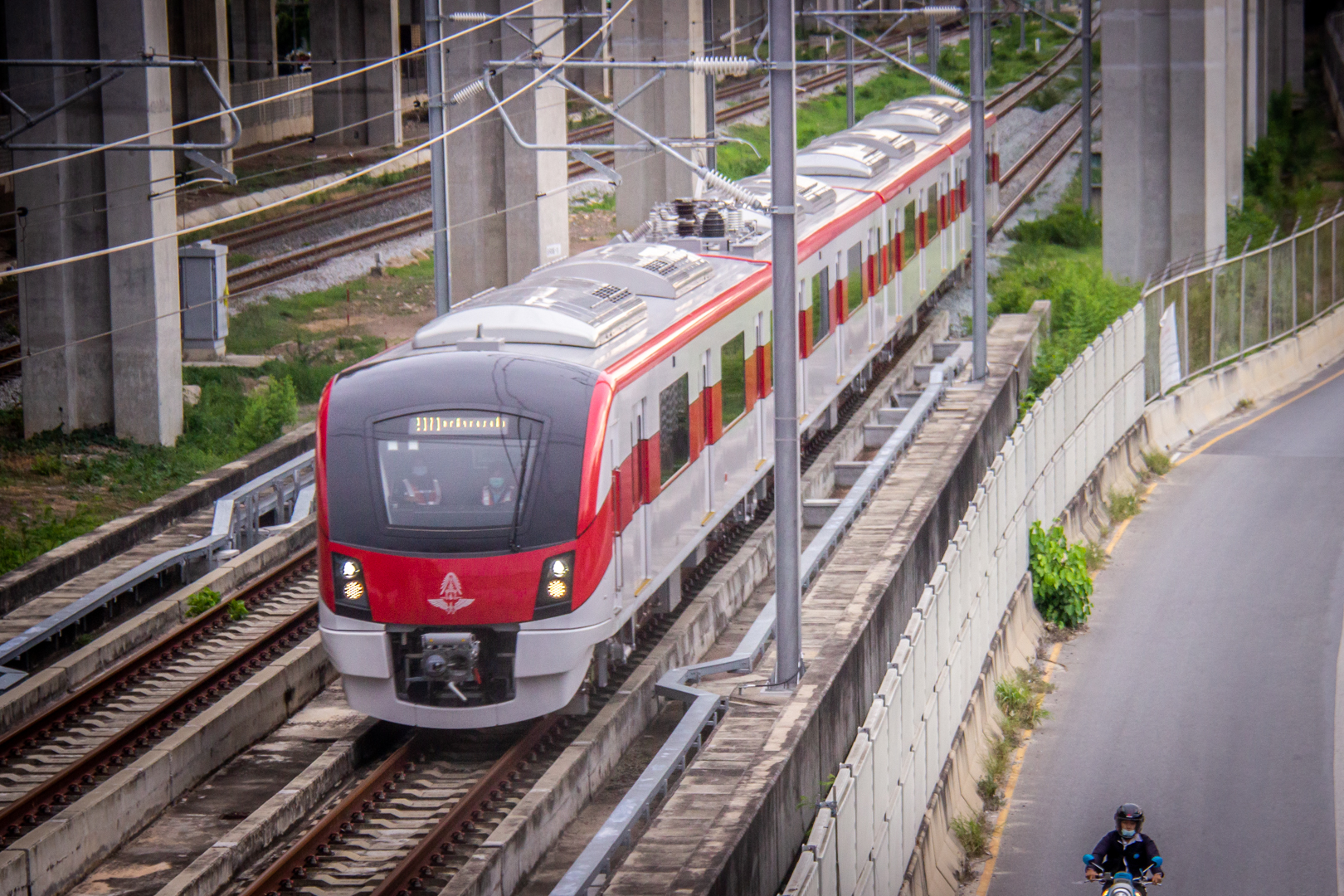
- SRT Light Red Line train at Bang Bamru railway station

Overview
- Other name: Nakhon Withi Line
- Native name: สายนครวิถี
- Status: Operational (Phase I)
- Owner: State Railway of Thailand
- Locale: Bangkok Metropolitan Region
- Termini: Krung Thep Aphiwat; Taling Chan
- Stations: 4
- Website: State Railway of Thailand

Service
- Type: Commuter rail
- System: SRT Red Lines
- Operator: SRTET - SRT Electrified Train Company Limited
- Depot(s): Chatuchak, Bangkok
- Rolling stock: Hitachi AT100

History
- Opened: 2 August 2021 (free trial service); 29 November 2021 (commercial service)

Technical
- Line length: 15.26 km (9.48 mi)
- Num of tracks: 2
- Character: Elevated
- Track gauge: 1,000 mm (3 ft 3 3/8 in) metre gauge
- Electrification: 25 kV 50 Hz AC overhead catenary
- Operating speed: 90 km/h (56 mph)
- Signalling: Thales AlTrac for ERTMS (ECTS Level 1)

The SRT Light Red Line, or Nakhon Withi Line (Thai: รถไฟชานเมือง สายนครวิถี) is a 15 km (9.3 mi) between Krung Thep Aphiwat Central Terminal and Taling Chan and is part of the SRT Red Lines suburban railway system serving the greater Bangkok Metropolitan Region. The construction plan is split into 5 phases.

Phase I running between Krung Thep Aphiwat Central Terminal and Taling Chan opened for trial operations on 2 August 2021 with full commercial services commencing on 29 November 2021. An initial segment from Taling Chan to Bang Son previously opened for limited, free trial service between 5 December 2012 and 13 January 2014 with only 12 services a day until all services were fully suspended due to the lack of rolling stock.

Extensions for Phase II running from Taling Chan to Salaya and Phase III spur line from Taling Chan to Siriraj were approved by the Thai Cabinet on 17 June 2025. In addition, three infill stations of Rama VI Bridge, Bang Kruai (EGAT) and Ban Chim Phli were approved under a single construction contract totalling 20.5 km. The proposal had been submitted to the Cabinet secretariat on 27 March 2025 and expects to open bidding in late-2025. Bids for construction on the Phase II extension and 3 infill stations were opened until 29 December 2025, with winning bids announced by the MRTA in January 2026. Contracts are expected to be finalised in February 2026, with construction expected to last 36 months to February 2029 and a target to begin services in March 2029.

As of June 2025, there are no updates for Phase IV and Phase V of the project. When fully completed, the line will run east–west from Salaya, Thailand in Phutthamonthon District of Nakhon Pathom Province to Hua Mak railway station in Bangkok.

== Route alignment ==
The 15 km (9.3 mi) section runs from Krung Thep Aphiwat Central Terminal (the new Intercity Terminal in Chatuchak District) to Bang Son where it interchanges with the MRT Purple Line. It then continues west and crosses the Chao Phraya River to the Thonburi side of Bangkok before continuing farther west to Taling Chan where it terminates. Krung Thep Aphiwat Central Terminal Intercity Terminal provides interchange with the SRT Dark Red Line and MRT Blue Line. The line will be extended 14.8 km (9.2 mi) west to Sala Ya in Phutthamonthon District of Nakhon Pathom Province. Finally, the line will be extended south from Krung Thep Aphiwat Central Terminal via Phaya Thai and then east to Hua Mak Railway Station in the east of Bangkok where it will interchange with the MRT Yellow Line.

== History ==
In 2004, in conjunction with OTP, the SRT began formulating plans for a new, modern suburban network in Bangkok along existing SRT alignments to replace the existing, limited services. On 7 November 2006, the Thai Cabinet passed a resolution to approve the framework of the new network with the SRT Light Red line being DMU operations while the SRT Dark Red Light would be EMU. The cabinet approved the line on 22 May 2007, with a budget of 13.133 billion baht. At the time, it was expected that the full iine could be completed within 15–20 years. Contracts for construction of the initial section from Taling Chan to Bang Sue were awarded by the SRT on 29 September 2009. The contract was signed on 15 December 2008, with the contract awarded to the Unique-Chun Wo consortium.

=== Construction ===
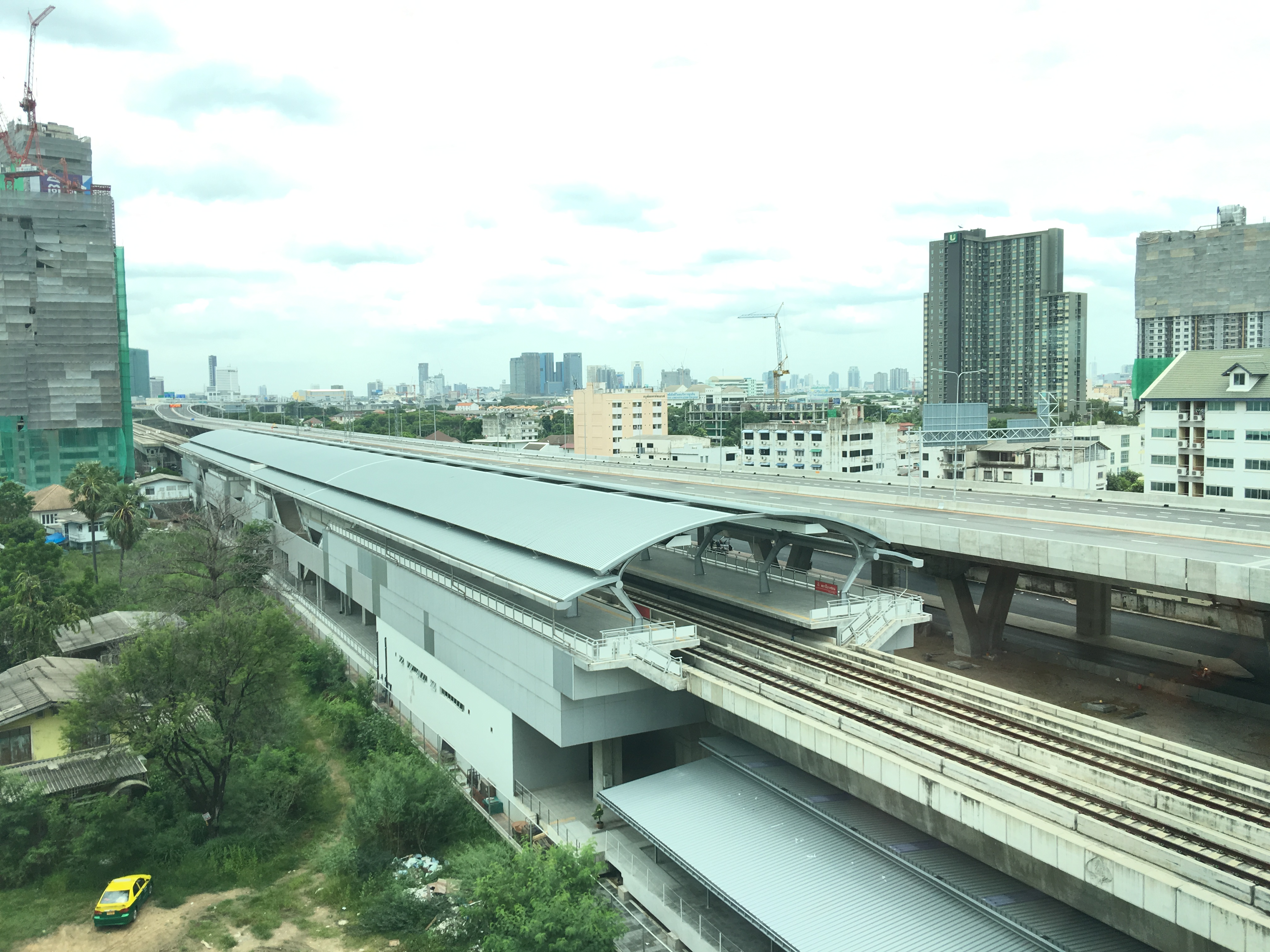
Bang Son Commuter station on SRT Light Red Line

Construction started in early 2010 after some site access delays related to slum dwellers who had been residing various sections of SRT land for many years. Works progressed well but were thereafter delayed for a few months due to the late 2011 floods in Bangkok with floodwaters inundated on parts of the route. Construction was completed by the 3rd quarter of 2012. Testing began in September 2012 for a 3-month period.

=== 2012–2014 trial operation and suspension ===
The line opened for free limited trial service on 5 December 2012 between Taling Chan Station and Bang Son Station. The line was operated with 2 refurbished DMUs running a very limited service. There were only 6 services each way a day every 60 minutes from 6am to 8am and from 4pm to 7pm. As such, only a few hundred passengers a day rode the service. On 14 September 2013, weekend services were cancelled. Effective 13 January 2014, all services were suspended until electrification works could be completed and rolling stock procured which was expected to be by the end of 2018.

=== Electrification and 2021 opening ===
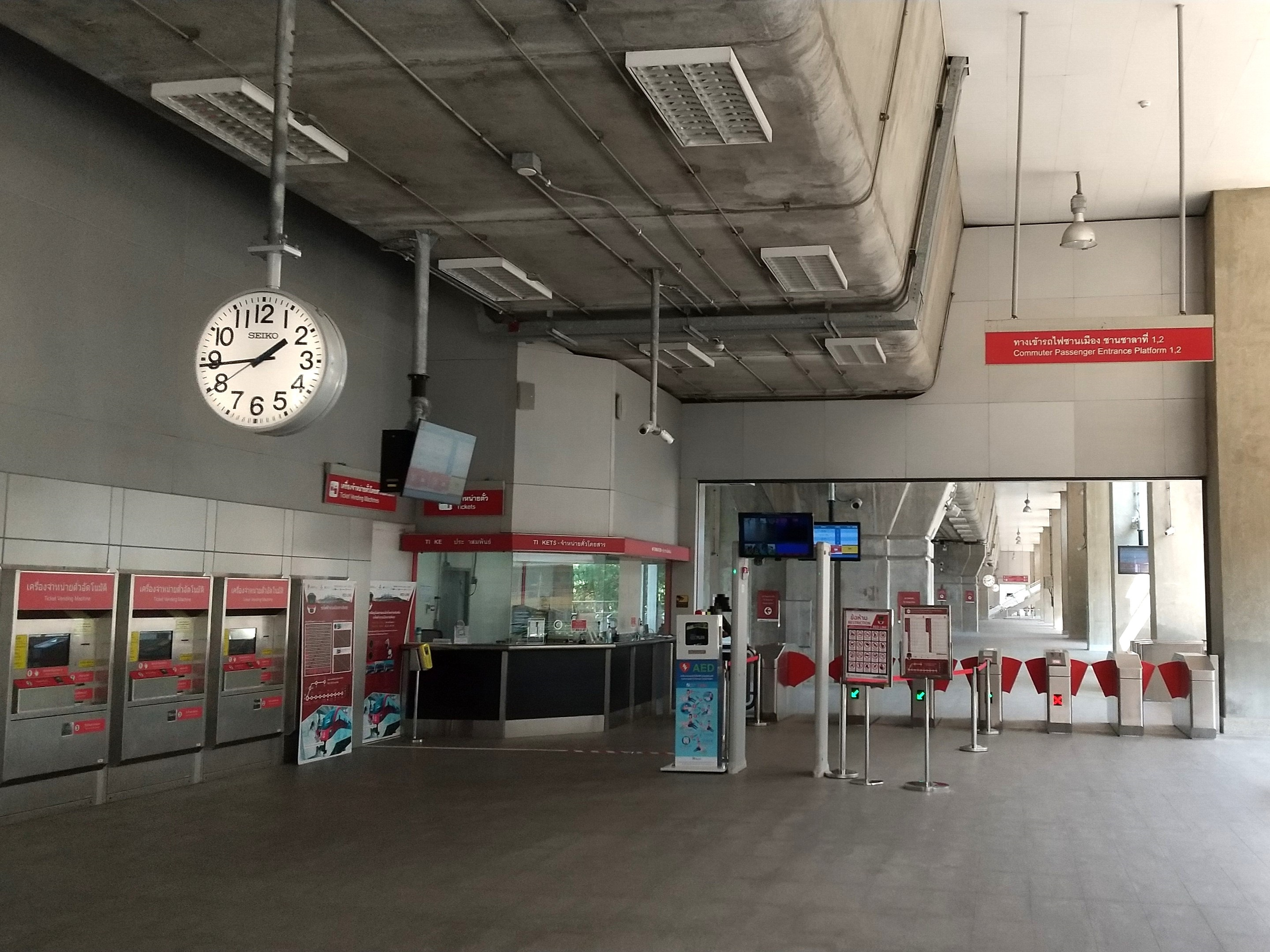
Ticket hall at Bang Son railway station

The reopening of the SRT Light Red line was contingent upon the completion of the new Krung Thep Aphiwat Central Terminal, delivery of rolling stock and installation of the overhead catenary electrical system between Bang Sue–Taling Chan which was funded as part of the SRT Dark Red Line contract 3 as the SRT had subsequently decided to change the line from DMU to EMU operations. Full electrification was planned to be completed by 2020 when the SRT Dark Red line was completed. By the end of September 2019, Electrical and Signaling installation was at 45.60%.

By June 2020, installation of the catenary system was at 76.82%. The line was expected to reopen in January 2021 after test runs began in late October 2020. In mid-November 2020, the Minister of Transport announced that free trial operations would operate from March to May 2021 with full-service operations expected in November 2021. In late February 2021, the SRT confirmed that free trial operations would commence on 26 March 2021 with full commercial operations starting on 28 July 2021. In July, the SRT postponed the service and the free trial operations commenced on 2 August 2021 with full commercial operations due to start on 28 November 2021.

== Rolling stock ==
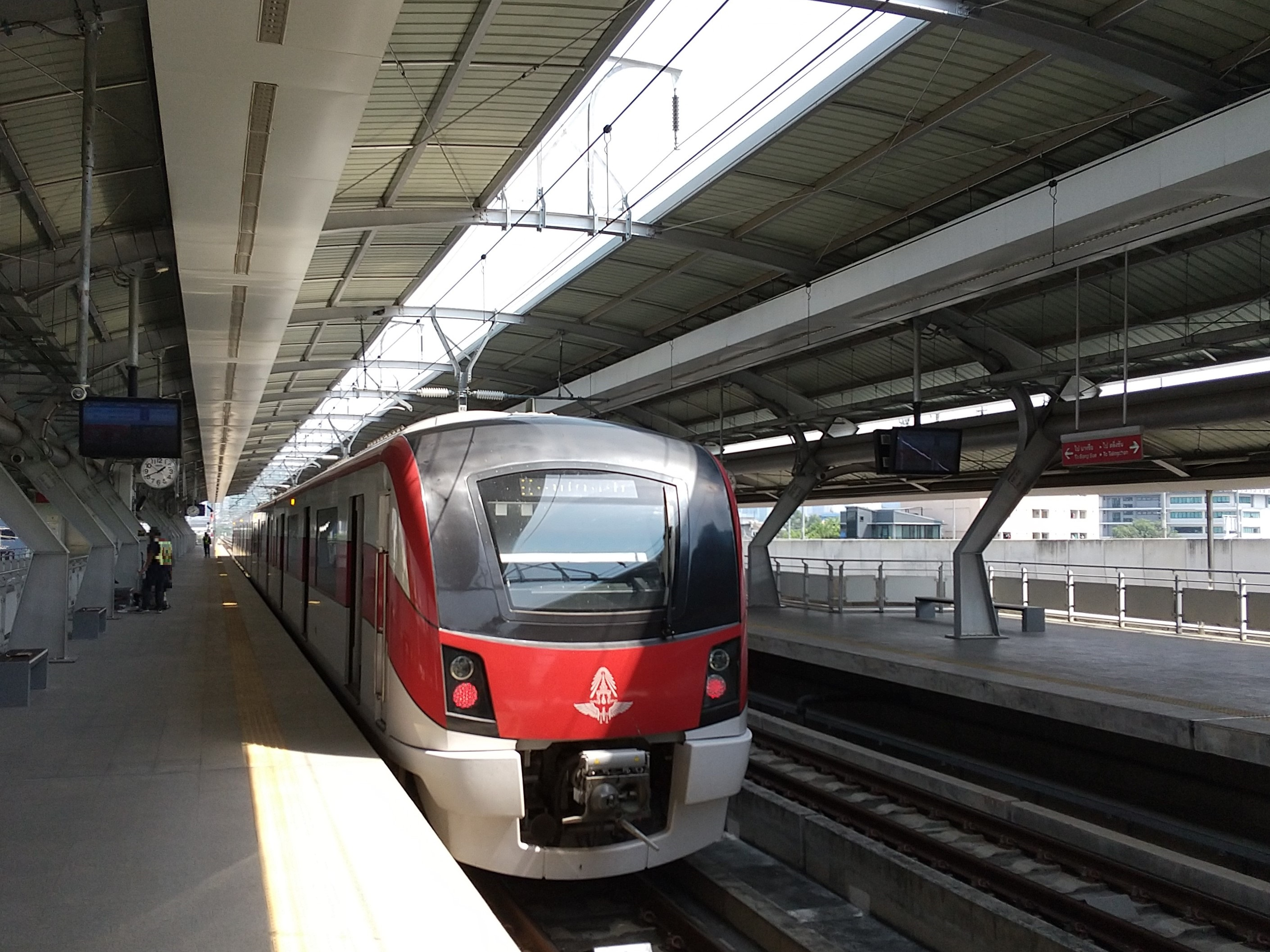
A Hitachi-built SRT 1000 series at Bang Son railway station

The 3rd contract for the SRT Dark Red Line was for the electrical and mechanical (E&M) systems and procuring EMU rolling stock for both the SRT Light Red and SRT Dark Red lines with an overhead catenary electrical system at 25 kV 50 Hz AC. In April 2014, only 2 bidders remained but one of the bidding consortiums was disqualified on due to the fact that one of the consortium members (Marubeni Corporation) had convictions for bribery in an Indonesian bidding process.

This left the MHSC Consortium (consisting of Mitsubishi Heavy Industries, Hitachi, and Sumitomo Corporation) as the sole bidder qualified for the contract. However, their bid of 28,899 billion Baht was above the SRT median price of 26 billion baht which was set in 2010. The MHSC Consortium argued that their bid reflected 2013 prices after the national minimum wage increase from 1 January 2012. Finally in July 2014, after a 2-year delay in the bidding process JICA approved the loan for Contract 3. However, the coup of May 2014 delayed finalization leading to further review and negotiations. By mid-2016, negotiations had concluded and Hitachi promised that all rolling stock for the Dark Red line would be delivered by 2020. The contract specified 25 EMUs consisting of ten 4 car sets and fifteen 6 car sets for 130 cars in total.

In late September 2019, the first 2 sets of rolling stock were shipped from Japan and both arrived in Thailand at Laem Chabang port on 12 October 2019 for shipment to Bangkok. By March 2020, 5 sets had been delivered. As of July 2020, 13 sets - 7 of the 6 car sets and 6 of the 4 car sets - of the ordered 25 sets of rolling stock had been delivered with a further 2 sets due to be delivered by August 2020. By the end of September 2020, 21 sets had been delivered - 13 of the 6 car sets and 8 of the 4 car sets - with the final 4 sets to be delivered in October.

== Operation ==
As of 2024, services operate from 5am to 12am with headways of 20 minutes. Distance-based fares range from 12 to 20 baht (previously 42 baht). The SRT also offers a 30-day integrated Transit Pass which can be used for 50 trips and for travel on all BMTA buses.

SRT long-distance trains on the Southern Line terminating at Krung Thep Aphiwat share the same tracks.

=== Ridership ===
On the first full day of free trial operations on 3 August 2021 total passengers numbered 302, on 4 August this increased to 331 passengers. By the end of September, this had increased to around 500-550 passengers a day. For the first 10 months of operations to September 2022 both Red lines carried over 3.2 million passengers and services ran on time 99.45% of the time according to the SRT. However, a small percentage of this were passengers on the Light Red line. By the end of September 2022 the line averaged only 23,000 passengers a month. In November 2022, the SRT introduced regular DMU services from Thonburi via Taling Chan to Nakhon Pathom to connect with the Light Red line. Afterwards, daily passengers numbers rose significantly from an average of 300 a day to between 1,400 and 1,500 passengers a day in January 2023.

SRT Light Red Line Ridership
Year	Quarter	Quarterly Ridership	Daily Ridership	Annual Ridership	Remarks
2024	Q1	161,535	1,737	697,550	
2024	Q2	151,417	1,697	697,550	
2024	Q3	188,667	2,052	697,550	
2024	Q4	192,931	2,098	697,550	
2025	Q1	202,649	2,179	805,408	
2025	Q2	185,490	2,039	805,408	
2025	Q3	215,354	2,341	805,408	
2025	Q4	201,915	2,197	805,408	The 20 baht flat fare on the Red and Purple lines ended on 30 September 2025
2026	Q1	159,788	1,775	511,350 (Note: As of October 2026)	
2026	Q2	142,600	1,567	511,350	
2026	Q3	158,176	1,719	511,350	
2026	Q4	50,786	1,638	511,350	

Note: Passenger statistics for the Light Red Line exclude users of the GATE EMV KTB card. The State Railway of Thailand does not publish separate figures for passengers using GATE EMV KTB cards the Dark Red and Light Red lines. As of Q1 2026, there is a daily average of 9,753 users on both lines.

== Future extensions ==
In July 2016, the cabinet approved the construction of the Bang Sue–Phaya Thai–Makkasan–Hua Mak segment. However, the 15 km (9.3 mi), 4 station western extension Taling Chan to Salaya was due to be tendered first by September 2018 and then slated for the 2nd half of 2019. However, the tender was further delayed until 2021 as the Transport Minister has requested the new Department of Railways to investigate conducting PPP tenders for this extension. The decision to change the extensions to PPP projects and tender out the operation of the line with a 50-year concession was opposed by the SRT and SRT union. On 10 February 2021, the Department of Railways announced that in April 2021 the SRT would issue the tenders for the west extensions to Salaya and from Taling Chan to Siriraj. However, the PPP tender process was subject to further review.

In October 2021, the SRT announced that the PPP tenders would not be released until June 2022 with the aim to sign contracts for the extensions (with 50 year leases) in July 2023. However, this was delayed yet again to an initial October 2022 tender release and later a December 2022 date. In late October 2022, the SRT again delayed the tender time frame to February 2023 with an aim to sign contracts by May 2023 but the time frame was contingent on new Cabinet approval of an updated budget for the extension. At the same time, the SRT decided to defer the bidding for the 50 year operation concession and new EMUs to December 2024. Once the concession is contracted the SRTET will cease to operate the line.

With the 14 May 2023 national elections and the expected time frame in the formation of a new government, it is unlikely that the tenders will be issued until late 2023. In late June, a MOT source expressed that the extension is likely be submitted to Cabinet in October 2023 for approval of a new budget of 10.67 billion baht to build the Salaya extension. If approved, a tender could be issued in the first quarter of 2024.

Extensions for Phase II running from Taling Chan to Salaya and Phase III spur line from Taling Chan to Siriraj were approved by the Thai Cabinet on 17 June 2025. In addition, three infill stations of Rama VI Bridge, Bang Kruai (EGAT) and Ban Chim Phli were approved under a single construction contract totalling 20.5 km. The proposal had been submitted to the Cabinet secretariat on 27 March 2025 and expects to open bidding in late-2025. The approved budget decreased from 16.847 to 15.176 billion baht, with construction projected to run from January 2026 to December 2028 and services beginning in 2029.

Construction segments based on M-Map:

Phase	Segment	Length	Progress
I	Bang Sue–Taling Chan	15.26 km (9.48 mi)	Full operation: 29 November 2021
II	Taling Chan–Salaya	14.8 km (9.20 mi)	construction start 15 July 2026
III	Taling Chan–Siraj	5.7 km (3.54 mi)	construction start 15 July 2026
IV	Bang Sue–Hua Mak	20.14 km (12.51 mi)	Under study
V	Salaya–Nakhon Pathom	30 km (18.64 mi)	Under study

=== Phase II Taling Chan–Salaya Extension ===
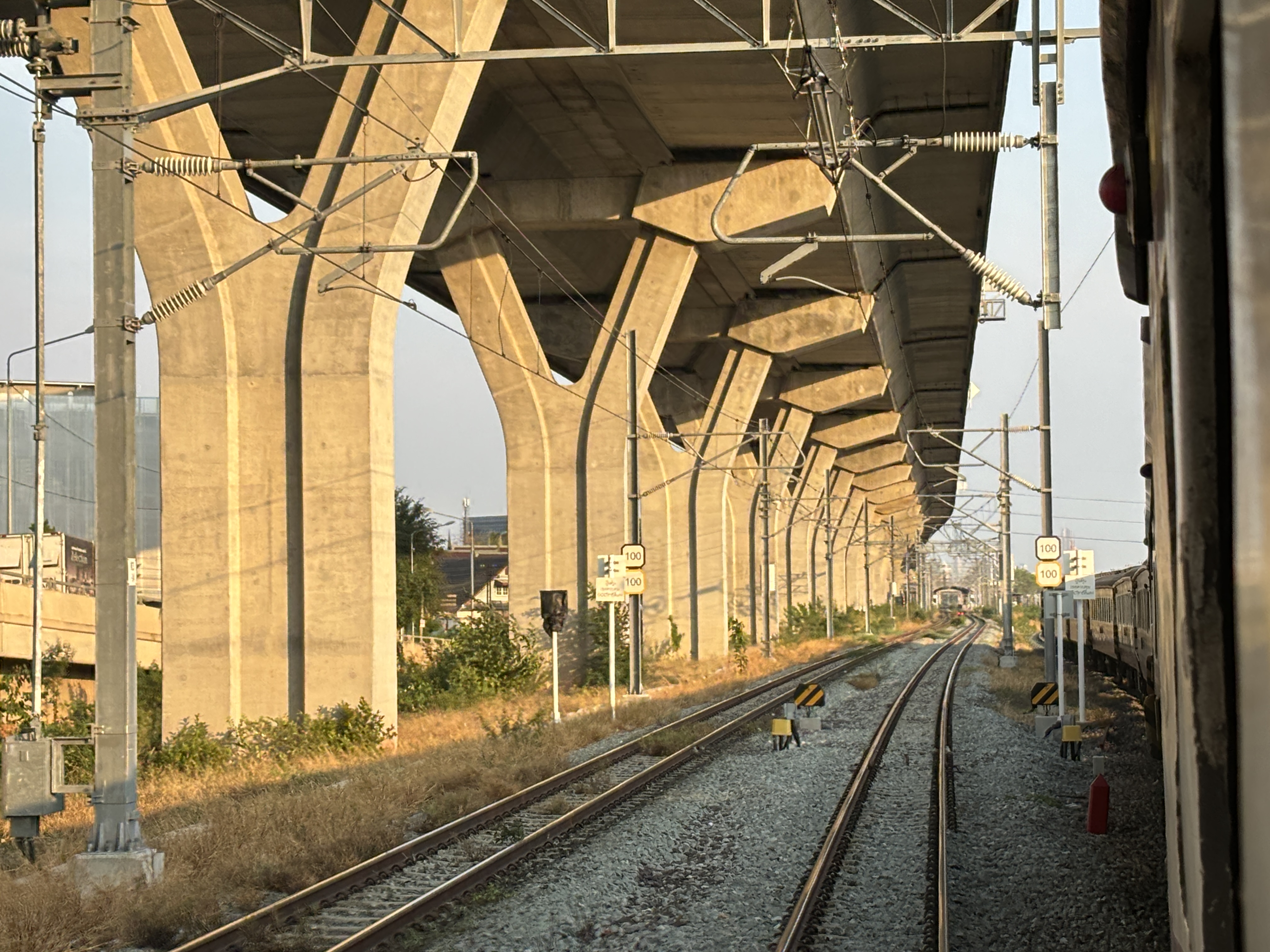
End of electrification segment west of the Taling Chan Junction Railway Station (2024)

The western extension of the SRT Light Red Line from Taling Chan to Salaya is approximately 14.8 km in length and will be constructed along the existing State Railway of Thailand corridor. The extension includes four primary stations: The SRT Light Red Line is planned to be extended by 14.8 km (9.2 mi) west to Salaya. It is planned to be built along the existing SRT corridor, and will consist of four stations:

1. Kanchanaphisek
2. Sala Thammasop
3. Salaya

The extension was originally planned to be tendered by September 2018 after receiving Thai Cabinet approval in July 2016, but was further delayed to the 2nd half of 2019. Tenders were further delayed until 2021 as the then-Transport Minister requested the new Department of Railways to investigate conducting PPP tenders for this extension.

Finally, on 17 June 2025, the Thai Cabinet approved both the Phase II extension and the Phase III spur line to Siriraj, together with the three infill stations, under a single contract. The approved construction scope totals approximately 20.5 km.

Bids for construction on the Phase II and Phase III extensions, and 3 infill stations, were finally opened until 29 December 2025, with winning bids announced by the MRTA in January 2026, budgeted at 14,720 million baht. Contracts are expected to be finalised in February/March 2026, with construction expected to last 36 months to February 2029 and a target to begin services in March 2029.

==== Infill stations ====
Two additional infill stations, Rama VI Bridge and Bang Kruai (EGAT) on either side of the Chao Praya river, were part of the original plans but deferred until ridership grew. These stations, as well as Ban Chim Phli, were tendered as part of the Phase II and Phase III extensions under a single contract.

1. Rama VI Station
2. Bang Kruai (EGAT)
3. Ban Chimplii

The contracts for construction were finally opened until 29 December 2025, with winning bids announced by the MRTA in January 2026, and contracts are expected to be finalised in February/March 2026, with construction expected to last 36 months to February 2029 and a target to begin services in March 2029.

=== Phase III Taling Chan–Siriraj spur line ===
The Phase III spur line will extend approximately 5.7 km from Taling Chan to Siriraj, following the alignment of the existing intercity railway line from Thonburi to Kanchanaburi.

1. Taling Chan Floating Market (Bang Ramat)
2. Charan Sanit Wong (interchange with the MRT Blue Line and MRT Orange Line)
3. Siriraj (interchange with the MRT Orange Line)

On 17 June 2025, the Thai Cabinet approved the Phase III spur line, as well as Phase II extension and 3 infill stations under a single contract totaling 20.5 km. Bids for the project were opened until 29 December 2025, with winning bids announced by the MRTA in January 2026, budgeted at 14,720 million baht. Contracts are expected to be finalised in February/March 2026, with construction expected to last 36 months to February 2029 and a target to begin services in March 2029.

=== Phase IV Bang Sue–Hua Mak ===
The eastern extension will be 18.8 km (11.7 mi) long with stations at Ratchawithi, Phaya Thai, Makkasan, and Hua Mak. It will have a narrow right of way given the current ARL viaduct and ARL stations.

The Phase IV extension forms part of the so-called “Missing Link” section of the SRT Red Lines network. The project overlaps with the Bang Sue–Hua Lamphong section of the Dark Red Line, as well as the Three Airport Railway.

The much-delayed Missing Link section gained renewed attention after the 2026 Bangkok train collision at a level crossing at Makkasan Station in central Bangkok. This along with 27 other level crossings in the city were intended to be eliminated by the Missing Link section of the Light Red Line.

The State Railway of Thailand brought forward proposals to complete feasibility studies on the line to submit to Cabinet in 2028, open construction bids in 2029 with an aim to complete the project in 2034.

=== Phase V Salaya to Nakhon Pathom ===
In March 2026, SRT announced plans to extend the line from Salaya to Nakhon Pathom. It plans to complete studies and detailed design by 2027, then seek approval and complete the environmental impact assessment (EIA) process by 2029. Construction is planned to start in 2030 and take about three and a half to four years.

The line extension is expected to start at Salaya, the future western terminus of the Light Red Line, and will continue west along the existing rail corridor until it reaches Nakhon Pathom. Total distance of the route extension is approximately 25.3 km. Planned stations include:

1. Wat Suwan Station
2. Khlong Maha Sawat Halt
3. Wat Ngio Rai Station
4. Nakhon Chai Si Station
5. Tha Chalaep Station
6. Ton Samrong Station
7. Nakhon Pathom Station

== Stations ==
=== Western stations ===
Code	Station Name	Thai	Express Train	City Train	Transfer	Province
SRT Light Red Line
RW01	Bang Sue (Krung Thep Aphiwat)	กรุงเทพอภิวัฒน์			SRT; ARL (preliminary works); MRT : Bang Sue	Bangkok
RW02	Bang Son	บางซ่อน			MRT : Bang Son	Bangkok
RW03	Phra Ram 6	พระราม 6				Bangkok
RW04	Bang Kruai-EGAT	บางกรวย-กฟผ.				Nonthaburi
RW05	Bang Bamru	บางบำหรุ				Bangkok
RW06	Taling Chan	ตลิ่งชัน			BTS : Talingchan (proposed)	Bangkok
RW07	Ban Chimphli	บ้านฉิมพลี				Bangkok
RW08	Kanchanaphisek	กาญจนาภิเษก				Bangkok
RW09	Sala Thammasop	ศาลาธรรมสพน์				Bangkok
RW10	Salaya	ศาลายา				Nakhon Pathom
Talingchan–Siriraj Branch Line
RW06	Taling Chan	ตลิ่งชัน			BTS : Talingchan (proposed)	Bangkok
RWS01	Talat Nam Taling Chan	ตลาดน้ำตลิ่งชัน				Bangkok
RWS02	Charan Sanitwong	จรัญสนิทวงศ์			MRT : Bang Khun Non; MRT : Bang Khun Non (tender awarded)	Bangkok
RWS03	Siriraj	ศิริราช			MRT : Siriraj (tender awarded)	Bangkok

=== Eastern stations ===
Code	Station Name	Thai	Express Train	City Train	Transfer	Province
SRT Light Red Line
RE01	Bang Sue (Krung Thep Aphiwat)	กรุงเทพอภิวัฒน์			SRT; ARL (preliminary works); MRT : Bang Sue	Bangkok
RE02	Pradiphat	ประดิพัทธ์			SRT (approved)	Bangkok
RE03	Sam Sen	สามเสน			SRT (approved)	Bangkok
RE04	Ratchawithi	ราชวิถี			SRT (approved)	Bangkok
RE05	Phaya Thai	พญาไท			BTS : Phaya Thai; ARL : Phaya Thai	Bangkok
RE06	Makkasan	มักกะสัน			ARL : Makkasan (City Air Terminal); MRT : Phetchaburi	Bangkok
RE07	Sun Wichai	ศูนย์วิจัย			MRL (proposed)	Bangkok
RE08	Ramkhamhaeng	รามคำแหง			ARL : Ramkhamhaeng	Bangkok
RE09	Hua Mak	หัวหมาก			ARL : Hua Mak; MRT : Hua Mak	Bangkok

== Network map ==
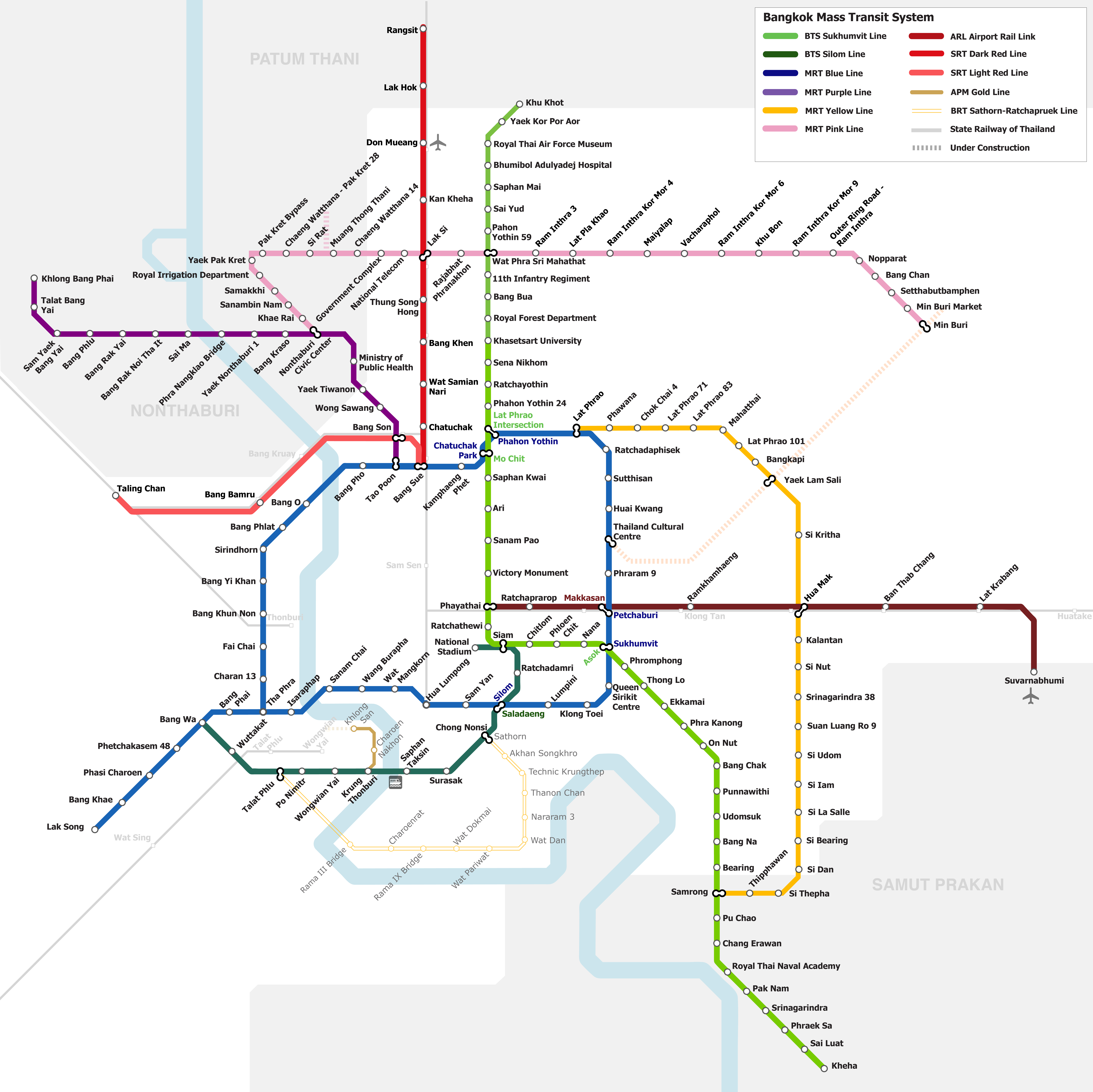

== See also ==
- Mass Rapid Transit Master Plan in Bangkok Metropolitan Region
- SRT Dark Red Line
- Airport Rail Link (Bangkok)
- MRT (Bangkok)
- MRT Blue Line
- MRT Brown Line
- MRT Grey Line
- MRT Light Blue Line
- MRT Orange Line
- MRT Pink Line
- MRT Purple Line
- MRT Yellow Line
- BTS Skytrain
- BTS Sukhumvit Line
- BTS Silom Line
- Bangkok BRT
- BMA Gold Line
