= Bang Bamru railway station =

Railway station in Bangkok, Thailand

Bang Bamru บางบำหรุ
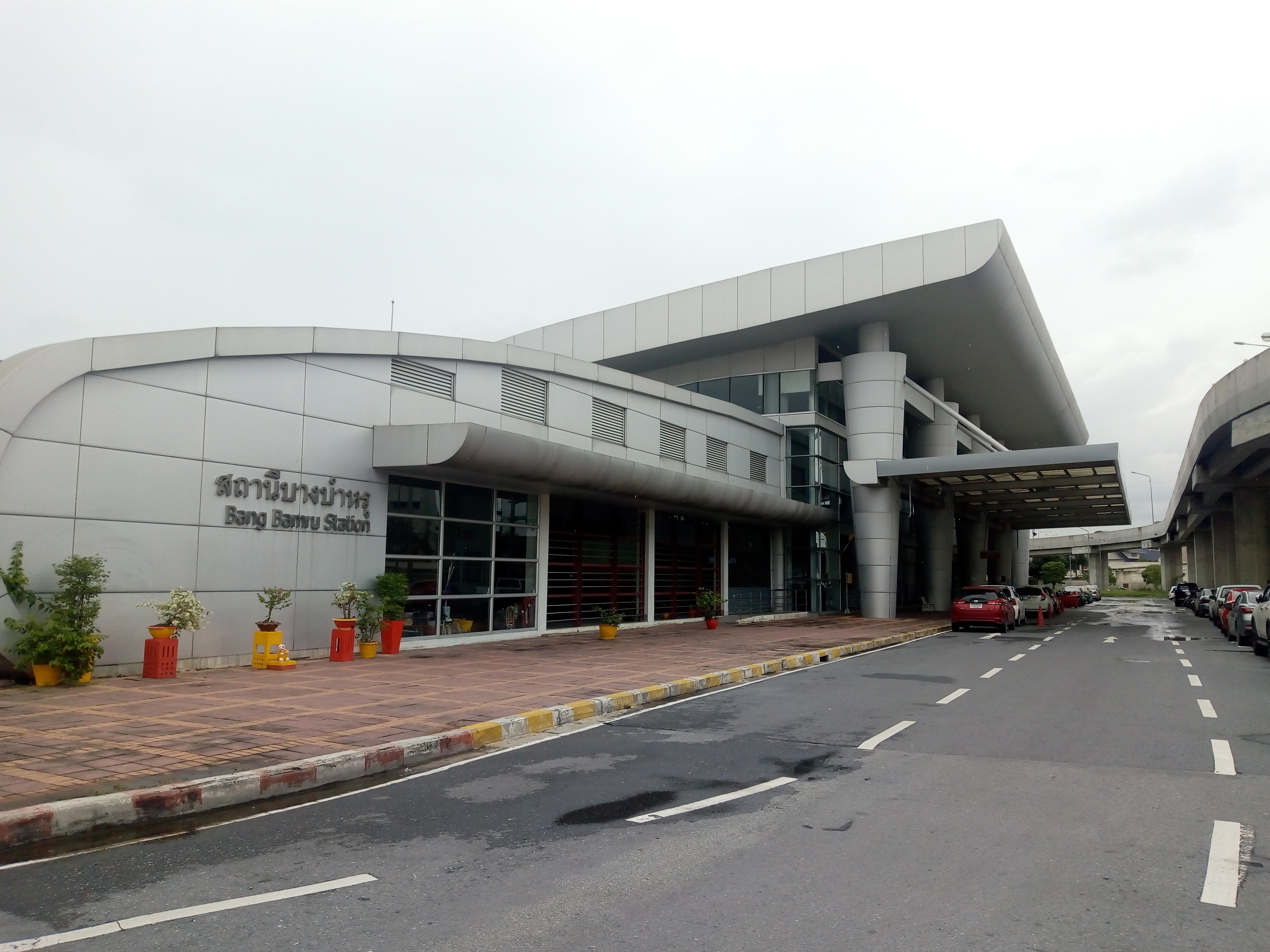
- Facade of Bang Bamru Station, September 2021

General information
- Location: Soi Sirinthorn 4, Bang Phlat Sub-district, Bang Phlat District, Bangkok (Southern Line station); Wat Chalo Sub-district, Bang Kruai District, Nonthaburi Province (Light Red Line station); Thailand
- Coordinates: 13.7918°N 100.4776°E
- Operator: State Railway of Thailand
- Manager: Ministry of Transport
- Line: Su-ngai Kolok Main Line
- Platforms: 3 (Mainline); 4 (Light Red Line)
- Tracks: 4
- Connections: BMTA Bus

Construction
- Structure type: At-grade
- Platform levels: 7
- Accessible: Yes

Other information
- Station code: บำ., RW05, 4005
- Classification: Class 1

History
- Opened: 2 August 2021; 5 years ago
- Rebuilt: September 2009; 16 years ago
- Electrified: 25 kV AC overhead line
Services
| Preceding station | State Railway of Thailand | Following station |
|---|---|---|
| Krung Thep Aphiwat Terminus | Southern Line long-distance services | Taling Chan towards Su-ngai Kolok |
| Bang Son towards Bangkok (Hua Lamphong) | Southern Line ordinary and commuter services | Taling Chan towards Su-ngai Kolok |
| Preceding station | SRT Red Lines | Following station |
| Bang Son towards Krung Thep Aphiwat | Light Red Line | Taling Chan Terminus |
Location

Bang Bamru Station Sign

Bang Bamru station (Thai: สถานีบางบำหรุ) is a railway station located at Bang Phlat Subdistrict, Bang Phlat District, Bangkok. It is a class 1 station and serves two systems operated by the State Railway of Thailand, Southern Line and the SRT Light Red Line. It is located 17.94 kilometres (11.1 mi) from Bangkok railway station.

== History ==
Bang Bamru railway station originally opened as a single wooden building with concrete platforms with a junction for a rail line to Northern Phra Nakhon Power Station at Bang Kruai for Lignite Coal trains from the Mae Mo Mines, Lampang. It was rebuilt to form a larger station with a concrete structure. And again in September 2009 to the current modern, concrete building with platforms also for the SRT Light Red Line project.

== Station layout ==
| G | Passenger building | Exit 1, passenger service center, ticket vending room, ticket vending machines, shops |
| G | | Southern HSR |
| G | Side platform, doors will open on the left |
| G | 1 |
| G | 3 |
| G | Low-level island platform |
| G | 4 |
| G | 2 |
| G | Side platform, doors will open on the left |
| B Station tunnel | - | Exit 2, Tunnel between platforms and passenger building |

== Services ==
=== Light Red Line ===
| Terminus | Days | First train | Last train |
Light Red Line
Platform 1
| Taling Chan | Mon - Sun | 06:10 | 19:45 |
Platform 2
| Bang Sue | Mon - Sun | 06:10 | 19:40 |

=== Southern Line ===
As of 6 January 2022, 16 trains serve Bang Bamru railway station (excluding services on the Light Red Line).

=== Bus services ===
The following BMTA routes serve this station:

- 79 (Borommaratchachonnani Depot – Southern Bus Terminal (Pinklao))
- 208 (Taling Chan – Arun Amarin) (Loop)
- 515 (CentralPlaza Salaya – Victory Monument)
- 539 (Om Noi – Victory Monument)

== Gallery ==
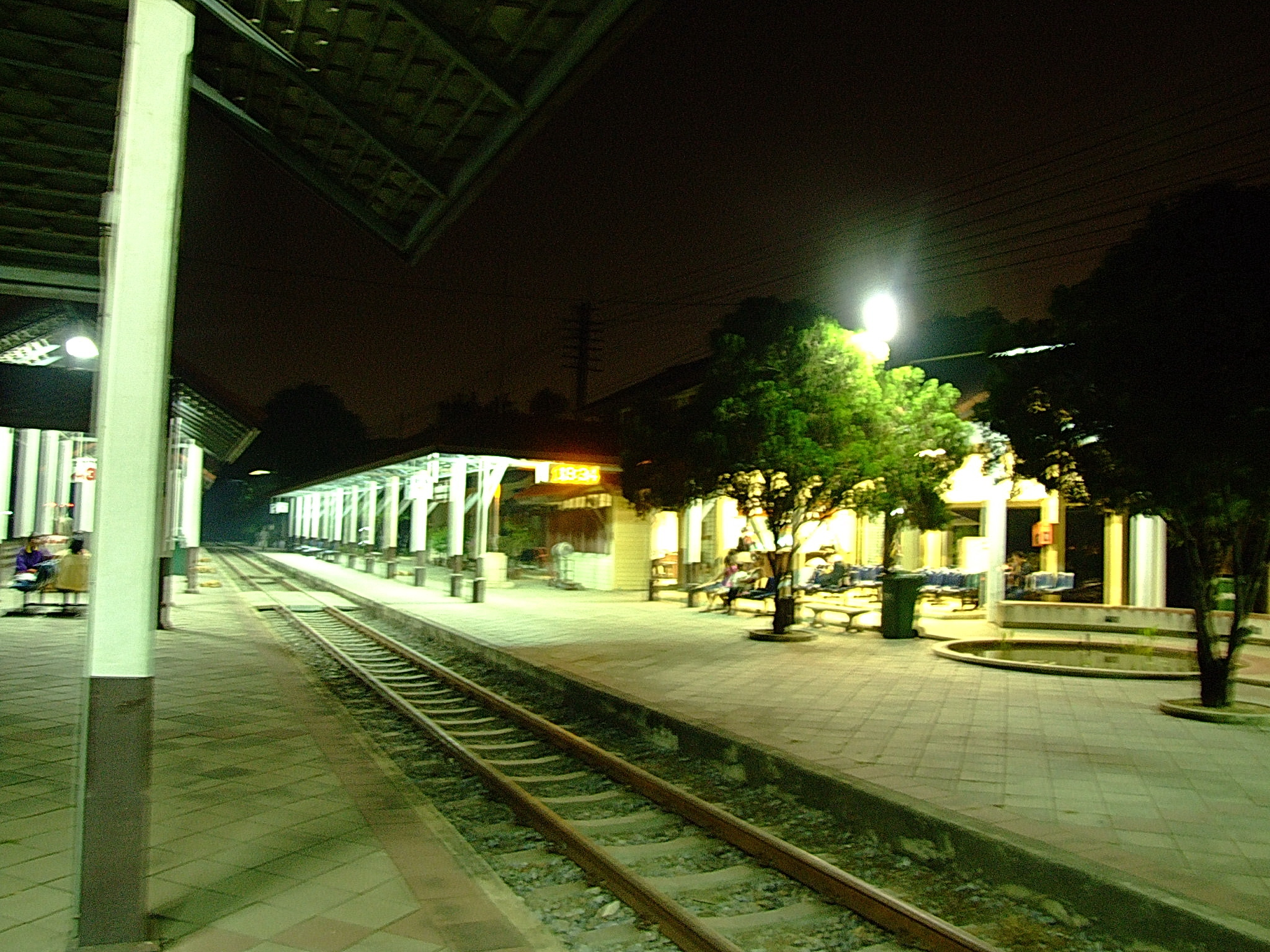
Bang Bamru railway station in 2006 before refurbishment

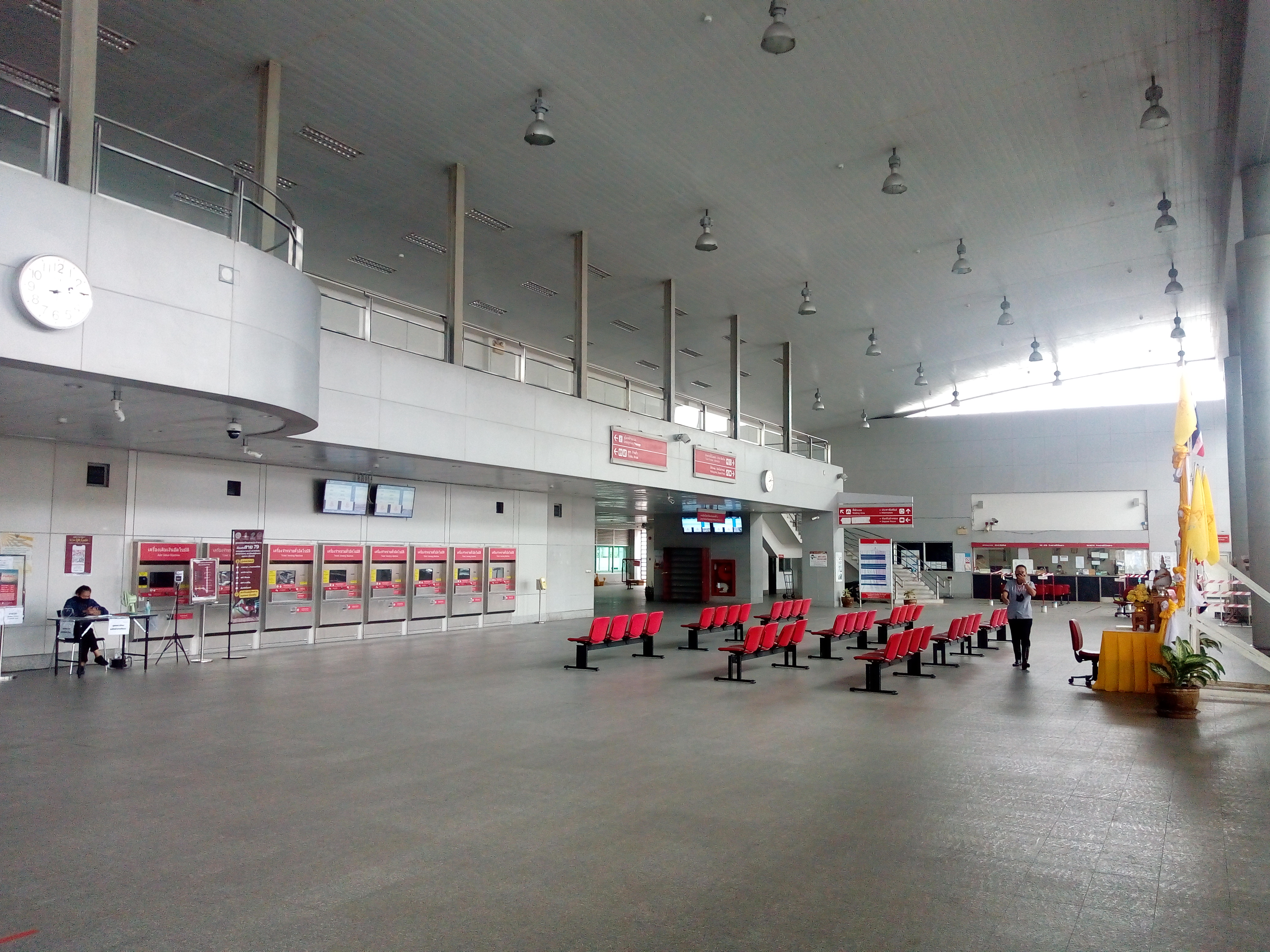
Interior of Bang Bamru Station

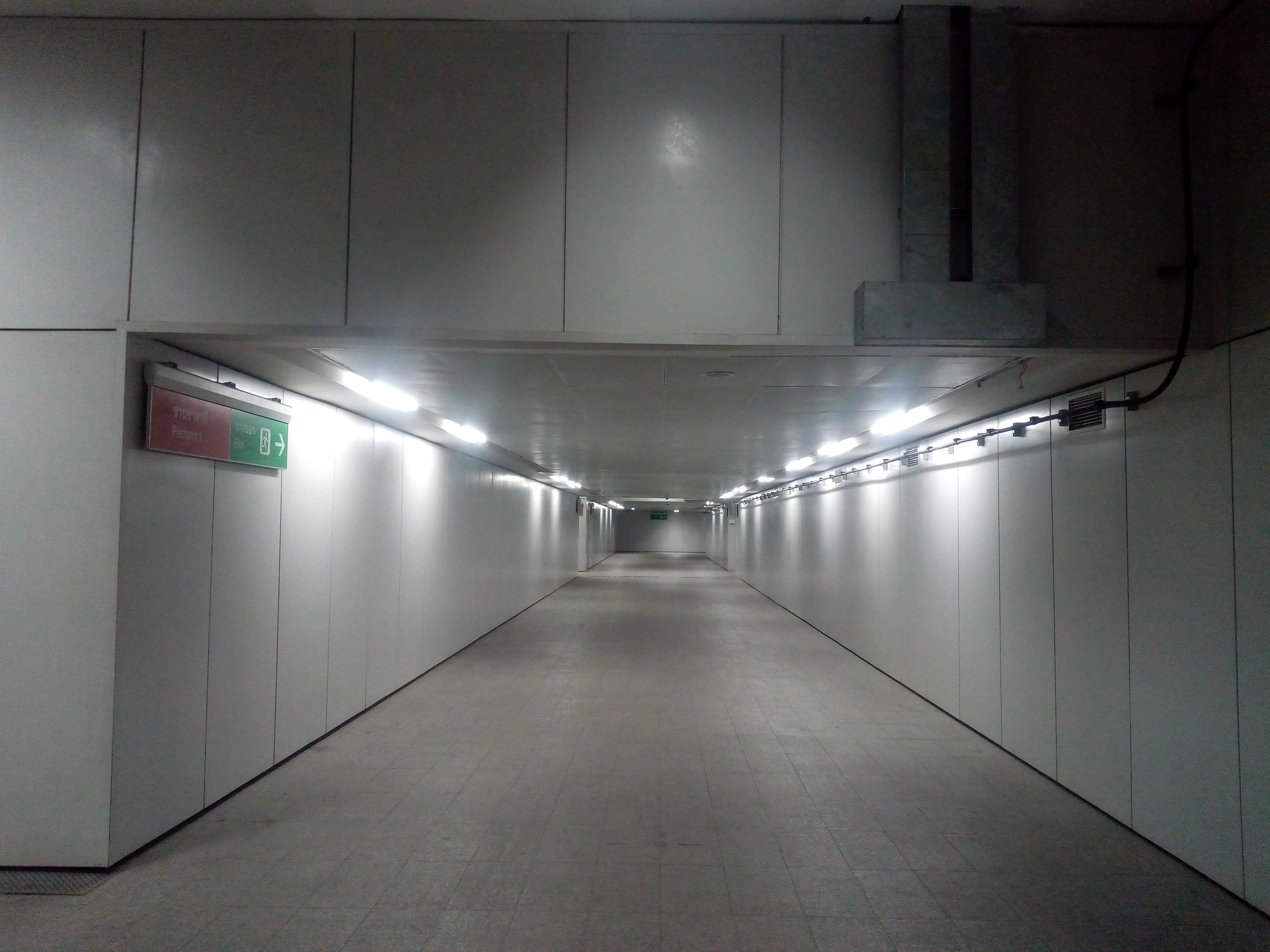
The tunnel between platforms

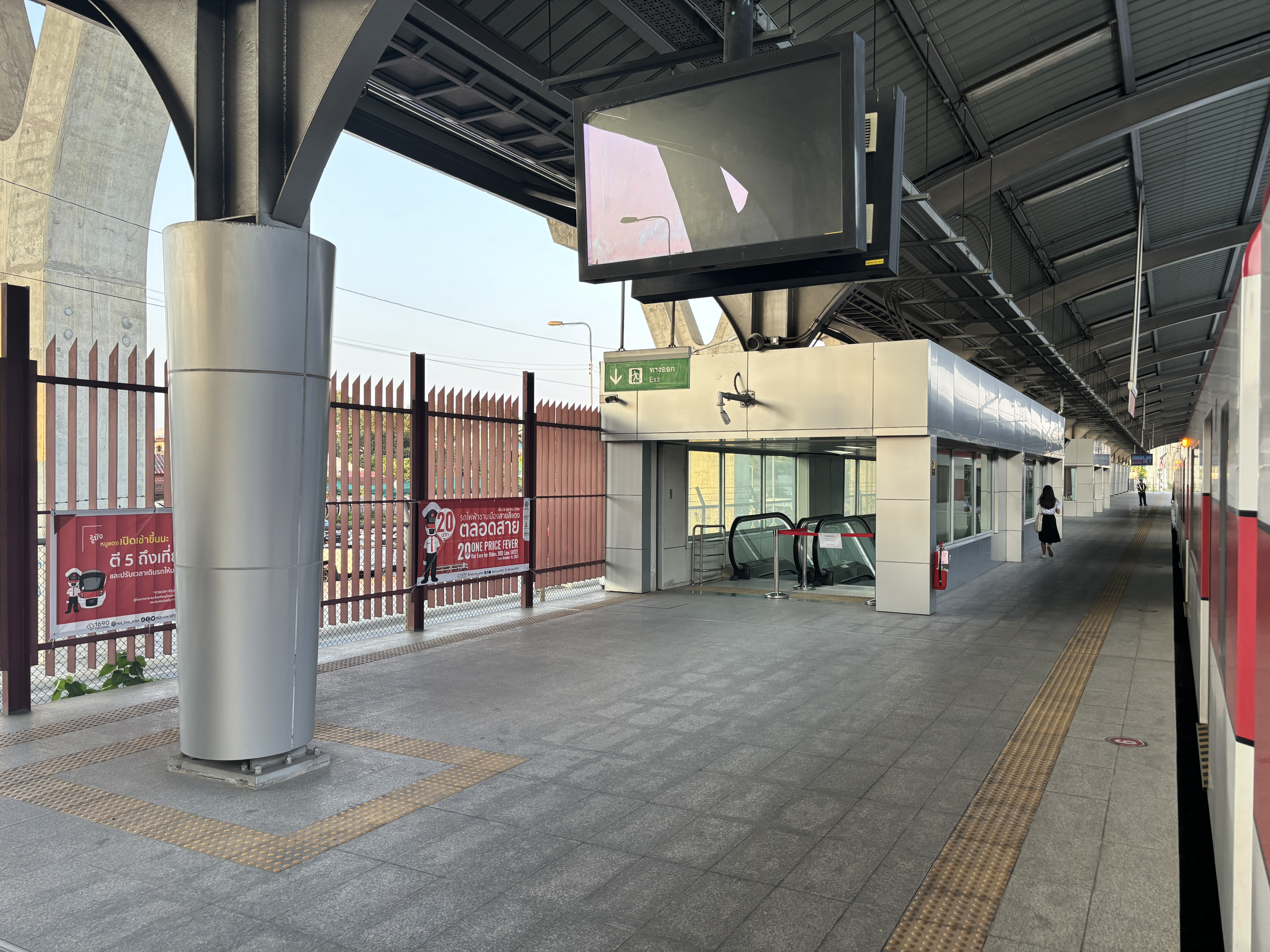
Platform 4 serves SRT Light Red Line trains towards Bang Sue station
