= Bang Son MRT station =

Mass Rapid Transit station in Thailand

บางซ่อน PP15 Bang Son
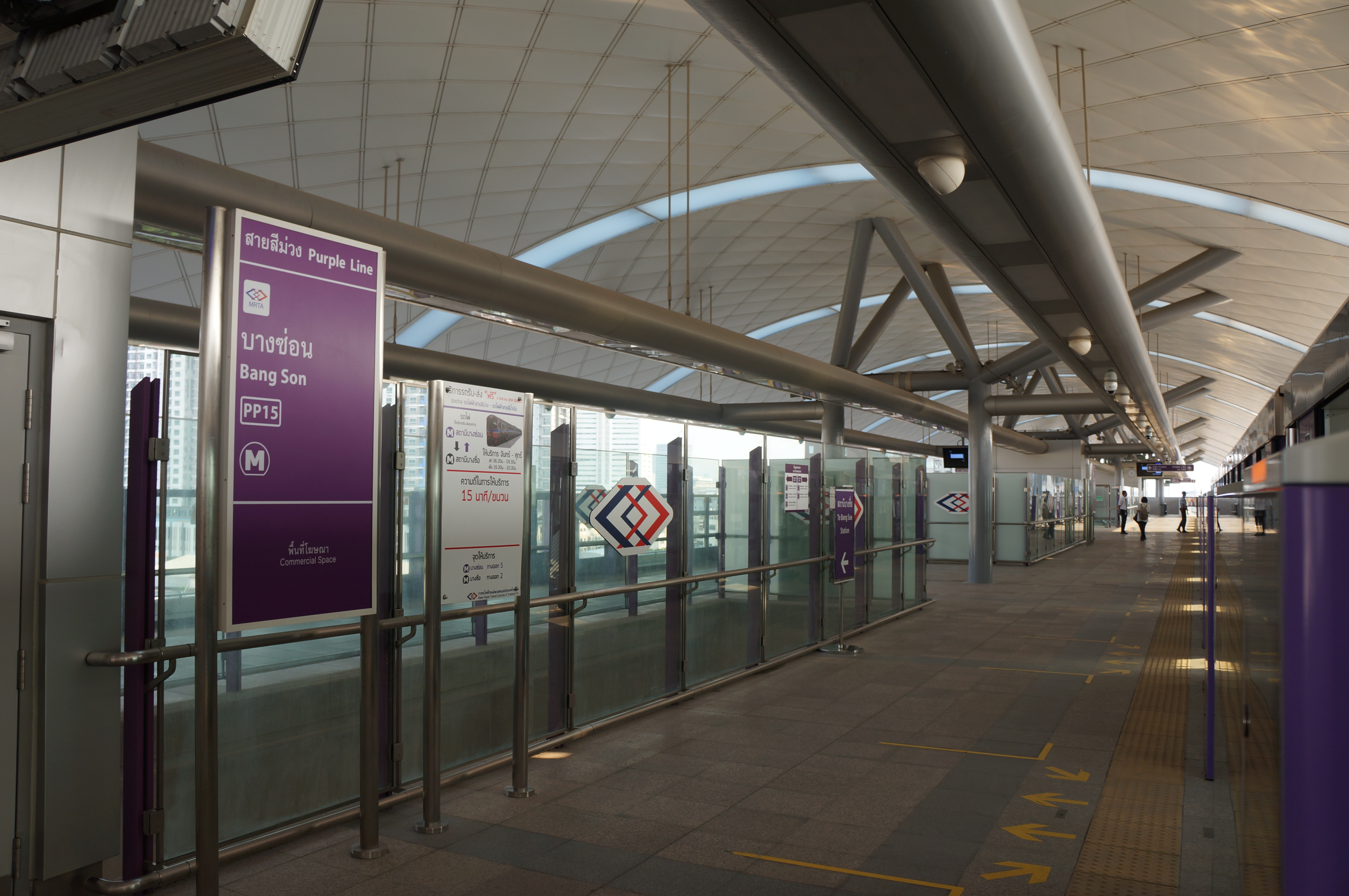
- Platform

General information
- Location: Bang Sue, Bangkok, Thailand
- Coordinates: 13°49′12.6″N 100°31′57.4″E
- System: | MRT
- Owner: Mass Rapid Transit Authority of Thailand
- Operator: Bangkok Expressway and Metro Public Company Limited
- Line: Purple Line
- Platforms: 2 (1 island platform)
- Tracks: 2
- Connections: Bus, Taxi, SRT Light Red Line

Construction
- Structure type: Elevated
- Parking: Available
- Cycle facilities: Available
- Accessible: yes

Other information
- Station code: PP15

History
- Opened: 6 August 2016; 10 years ago

Passengers
- 2021: 1,311,770

Services
Preceding station	Metropolitan Rapid Transit	Following station
Wong Sawang towards Khlong Bang Phai	Purple Line	Tao Poon Terminus
Location

Bang Son Station Traditional sign

Bang Son station (Thai: สถานีบางซ่อน, pronounced [sā.tʰǎː.nīː bāːŋ sɔ̂n]) is a Bangkok MRT station on the Purple Line on Bangkok-Nonthaburi Road in Bang Sue District, Bangkok. It provides transfers to SRT Light Red Line at Bang Son station, and the State Railway of Thailand at Bang Son halt.
