= Taling Chan railway station =

Railway station in Bangkok, Thailand

Coordinates: 13.7893°N 100.4393°E

Taling Chan ตลิ่งชัน
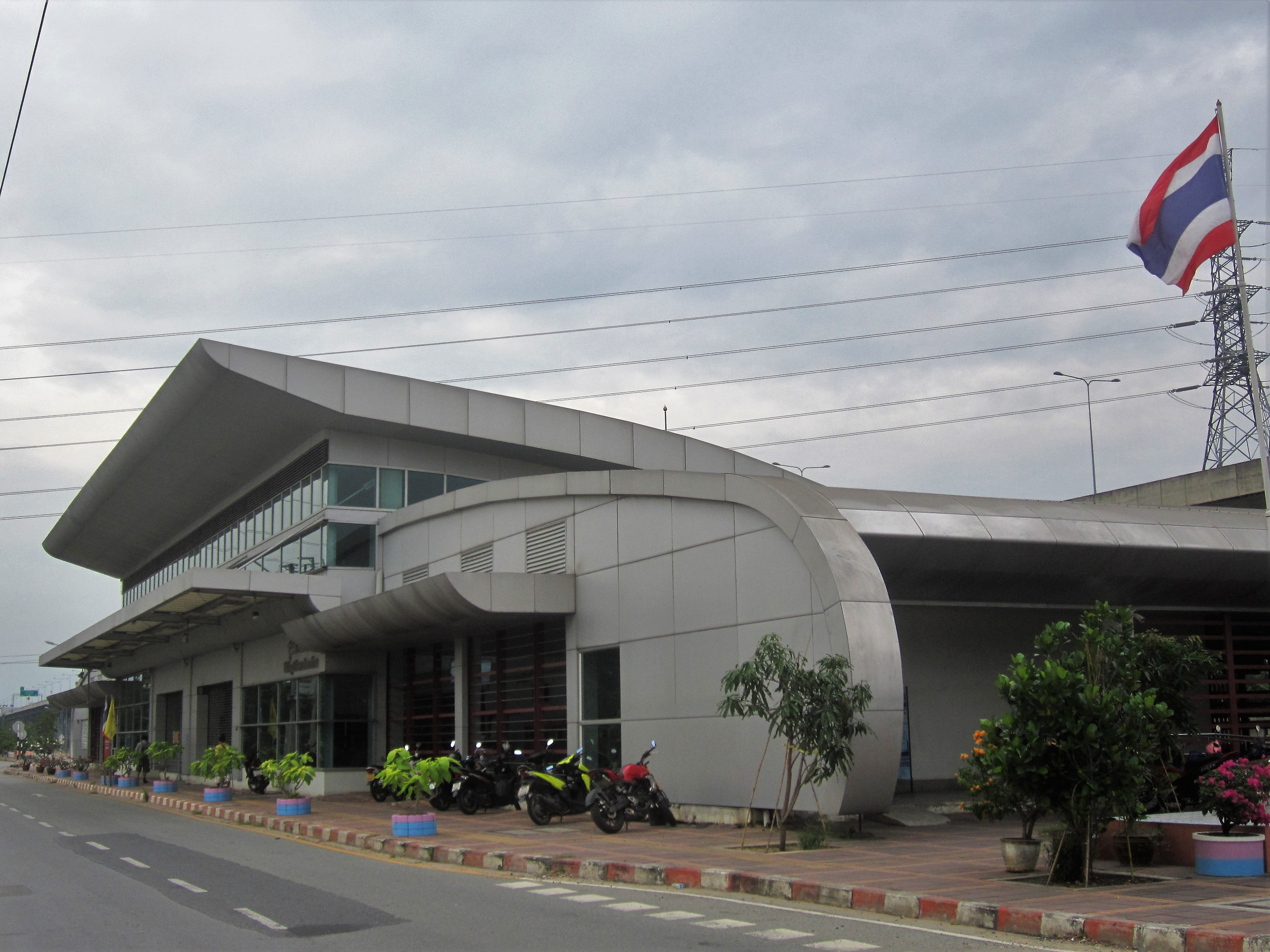

General information
- Location: Soi Chimphli 12, Chimphli Road, Chimphli Subdistrict, Taling Chan; Bangkok; Thailand
- Operator: State Railway of Thailand
- Manager: Ministry of Transport
- Lines: Su-ngai Kolok Main Line; Thon Buri Line
- Platforms: 3 (Mainline); 4 (Red Line)
- Tracks: 6

Construction
- Structure type: At-grade
- Accessible: Yes

Other information
- Station code: RW06; OR01

History
- Rebuilt: September 2009
- Electrified: 25 kV 50 Hz AC overhead catenary

Services
Preceding station	SRT Red Lines	Following station
Bang Bamru towards Krung Thep Aphiwat	Light Red Line	Terminus
Preceding station	State Railway of Thailand	Following station
Bang Bamru towards Hua Lamphong or Krung Thep Aphiwat	Southern Line	Ban Chimphli Halt towards Su-ngai Kolok
Bang Ramat Halt towards Thon Buri	Southern Line Thon Buri Line	Terminus
Future services
Preceding station	Metropolitan Rapid Transit	Following station
Terminus	Orange Line	Bang Khun Non towards Yaek Rom Klao
Location

Taling Chan Station is a railway station located in Taling Chan District, Bangkok. It is operated by the State Railway of Thailand and serves two routes: the Southern Main Line and the Bang Sue–Taling Chan SRT Light Red Line.

== Overview ==
In the future, it will become an interchange station and western terminus for the MRT Orange Line following the opening of the western extension in 2030. It is located 22.136 kilometres from Bangkok railway station. Taling Chan Junction serves as a junction for the mainline from Bangkok and the short branchline to Thon Buri railway station, near Siriraj Hospital.

Taling Chan Station is also the terminus for the current Light Red Line from Bang Sue. In the past, the station building was a wooden structure with about five platforms. Since 2009, the station was rebuilt to concrete and other tracks were removed for the SRT Light Red Line new tracks.

=== Bus feeder ===
Although Taling Chan District is full of many songthaew (local bus) lines, there is no line that provides service directly to this station including both BMTA buses and private joint service buses. Until July 25, 2024, BMTA changed the service route of ordinary bus line 4-59 (189) to provide service until it terminates here and make this bus provide service between Taling Chan Station and Wat Bang Yang temple, Krathum Baen District, Samut Sakhon Province.

== Gallery ==
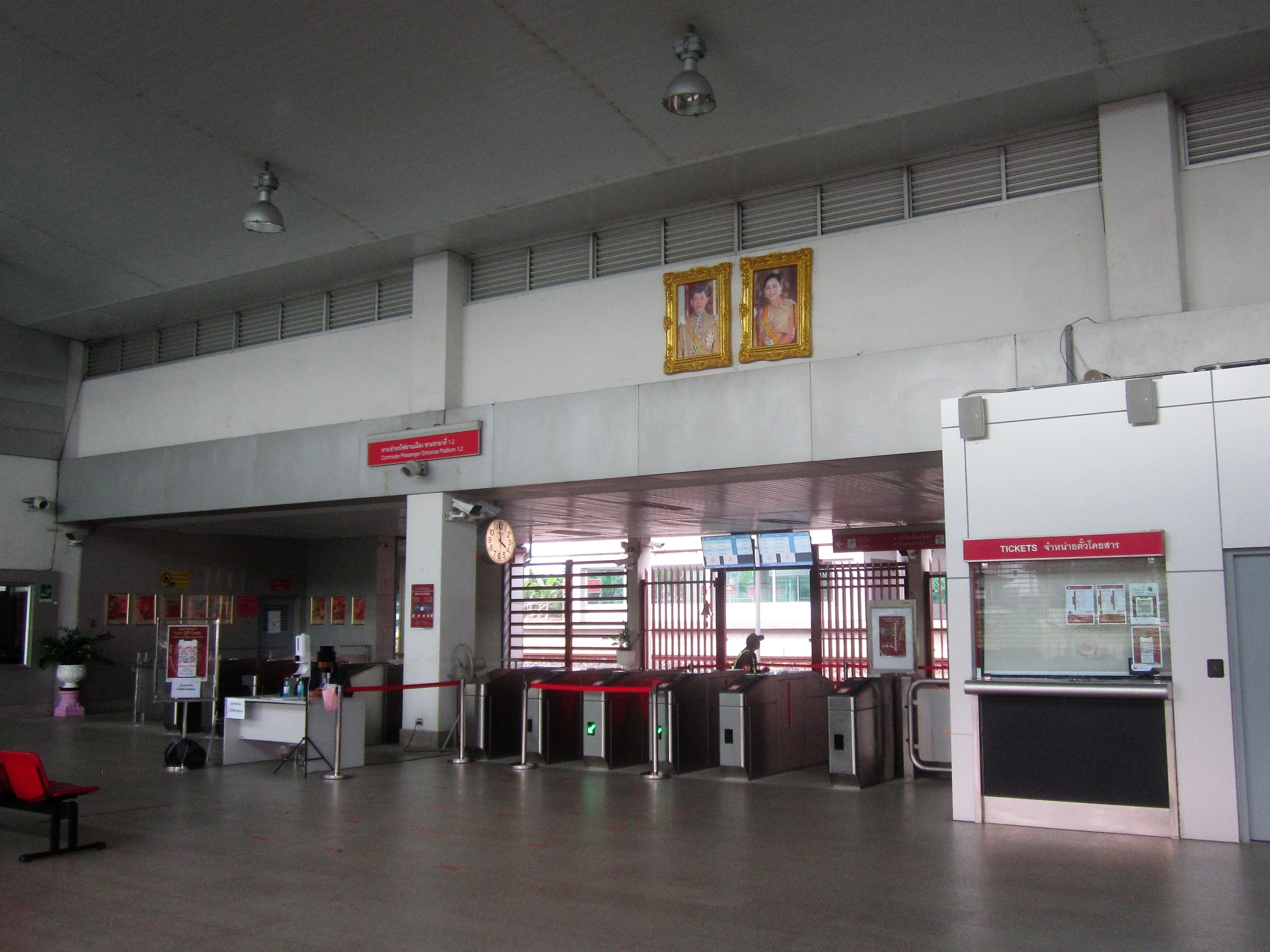
Interior of station building

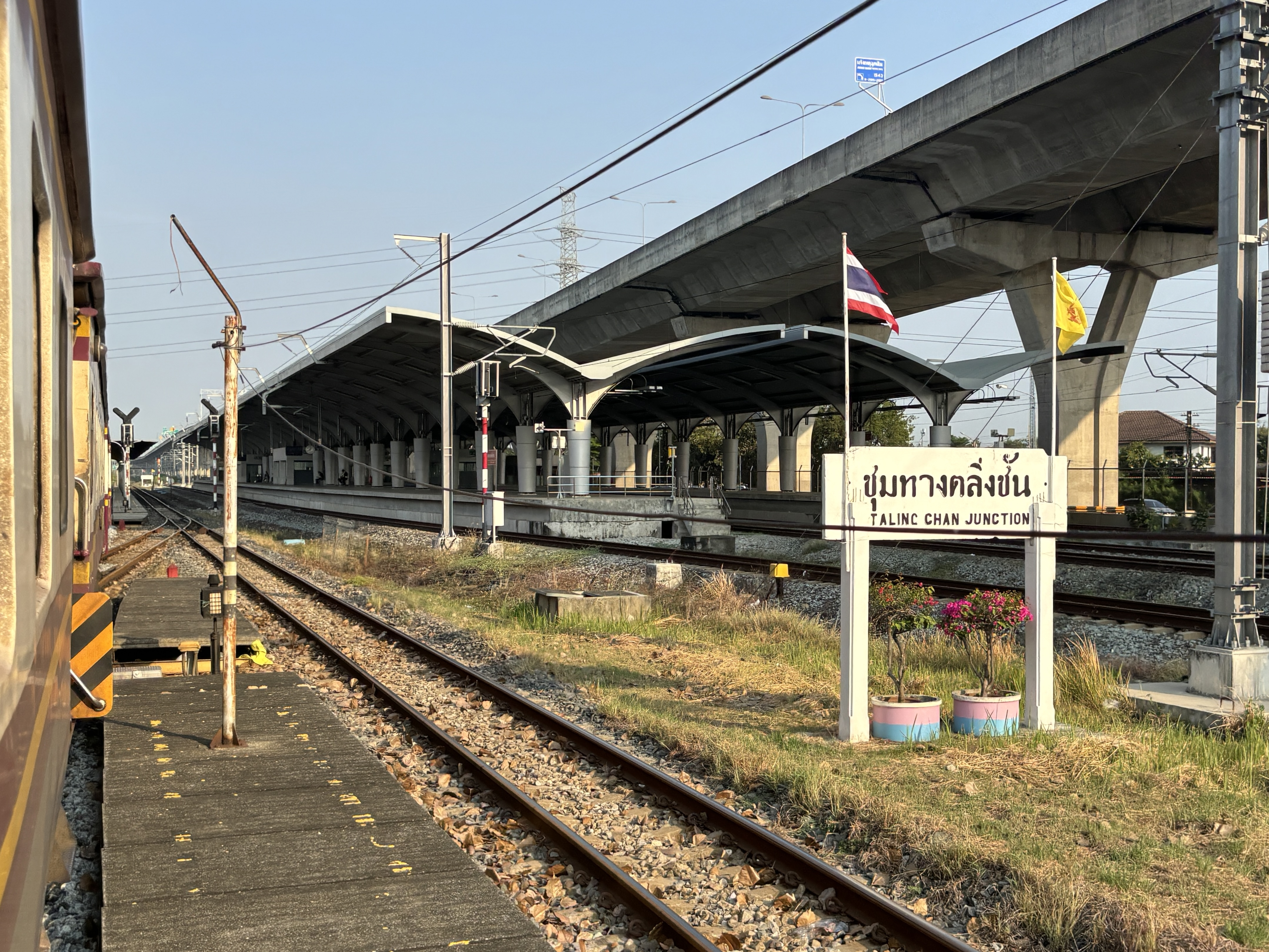
Old and new platforms

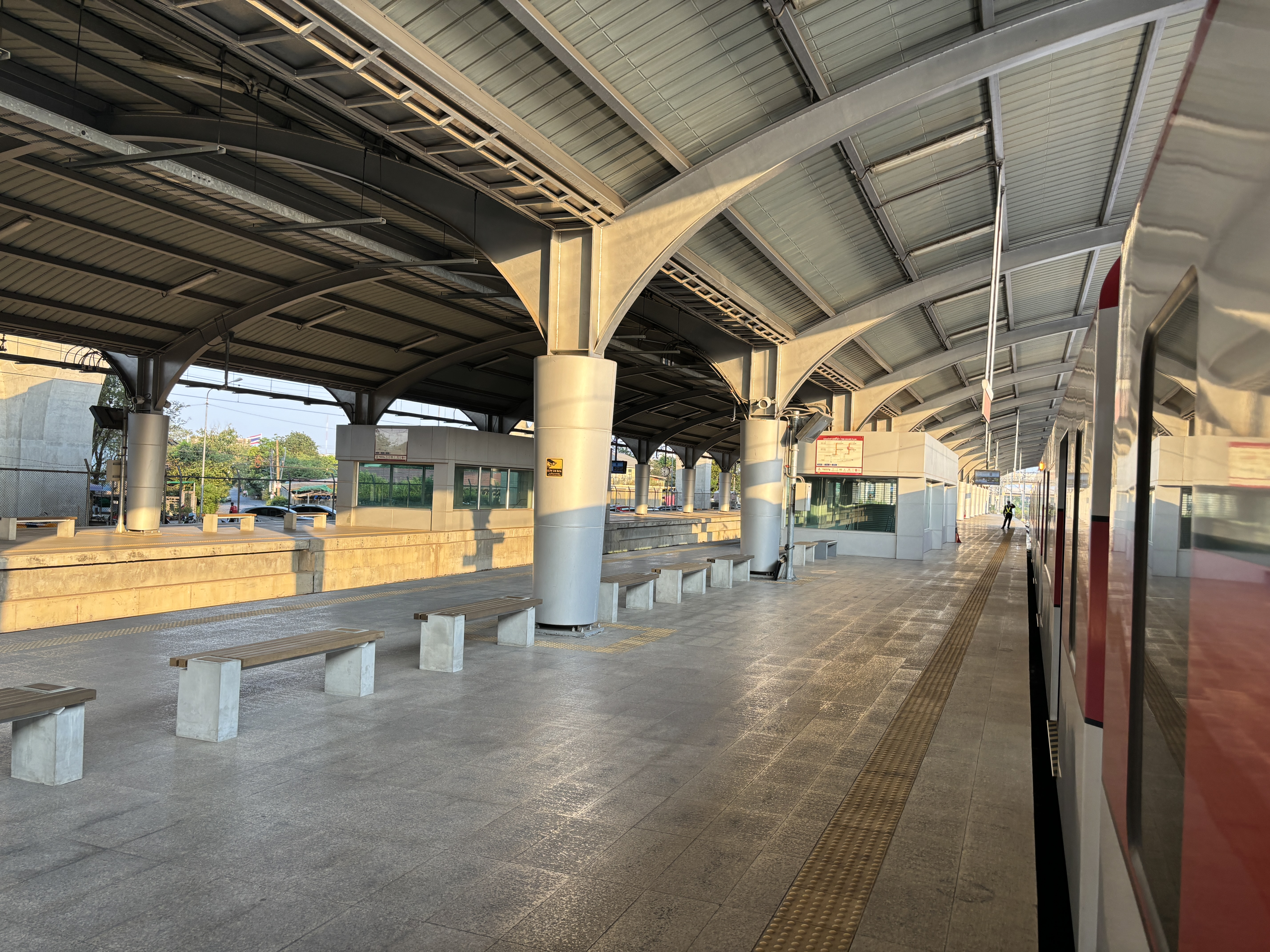
Commuter train platforms

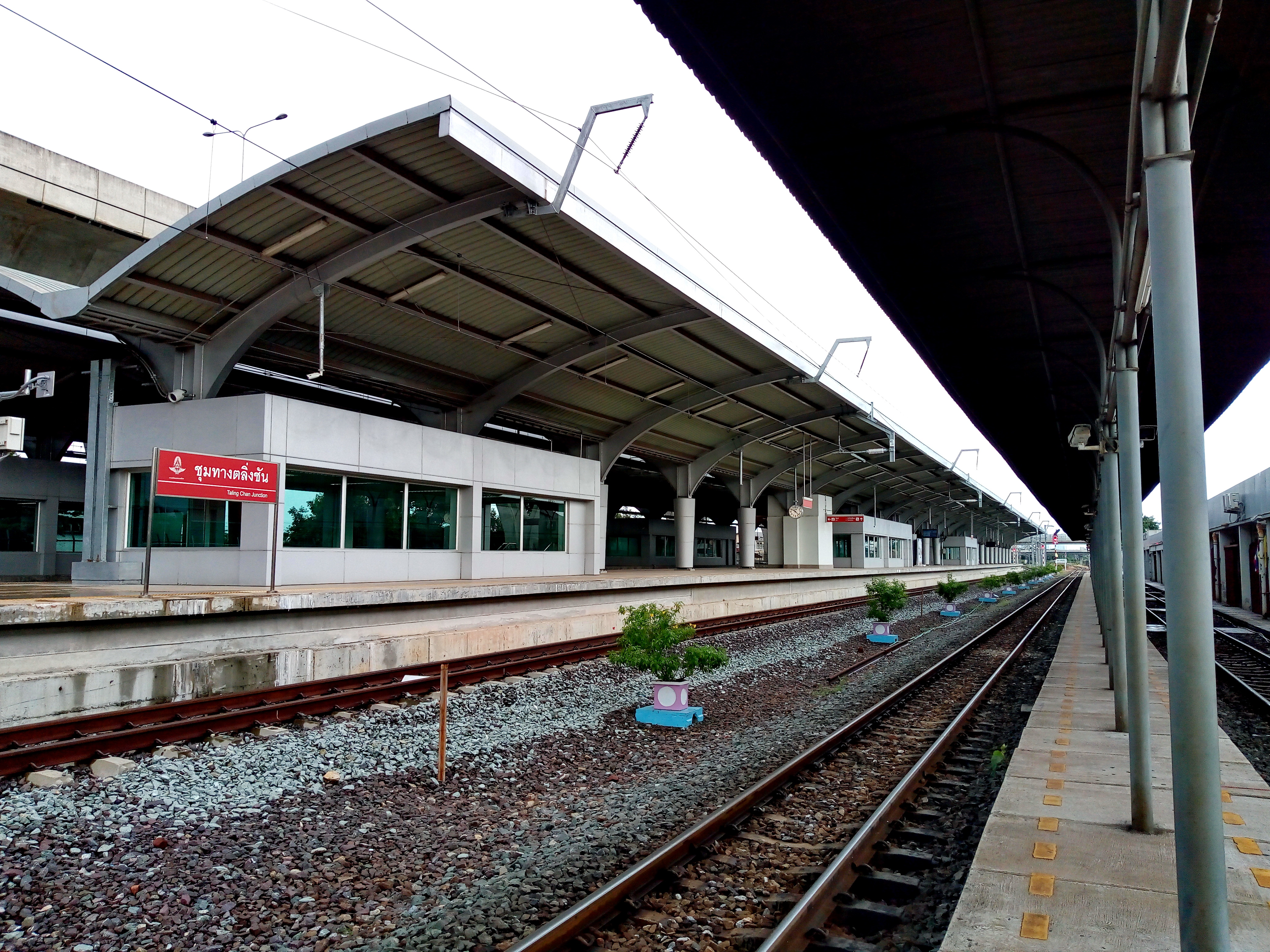
Commuter train platforms

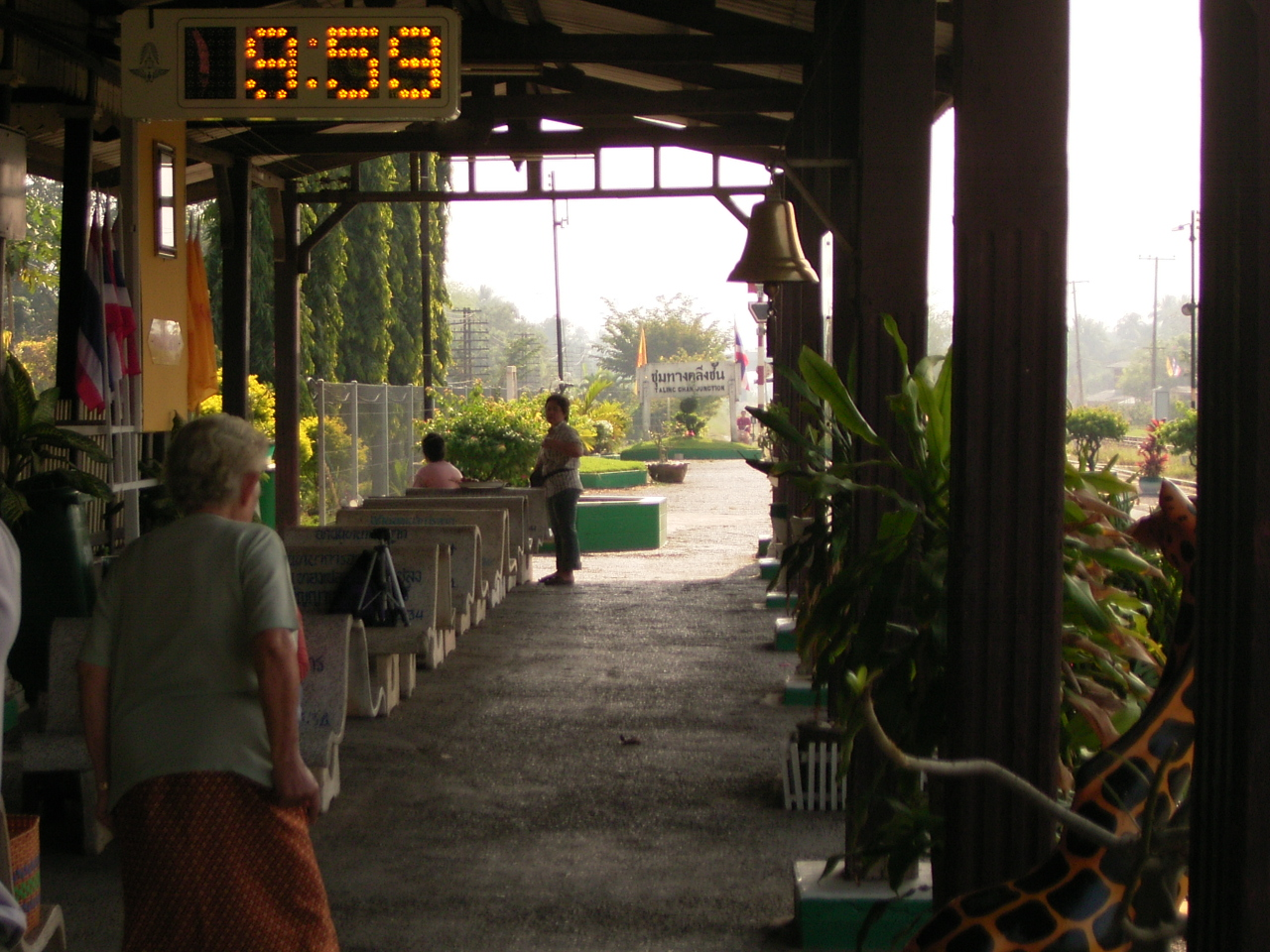
Taling Chan Junction in 2006, prior to refurbishment
