= Bang Sue district =

District of Bangkok, Thailand

Bang Sue บางซื่อ
- Khet
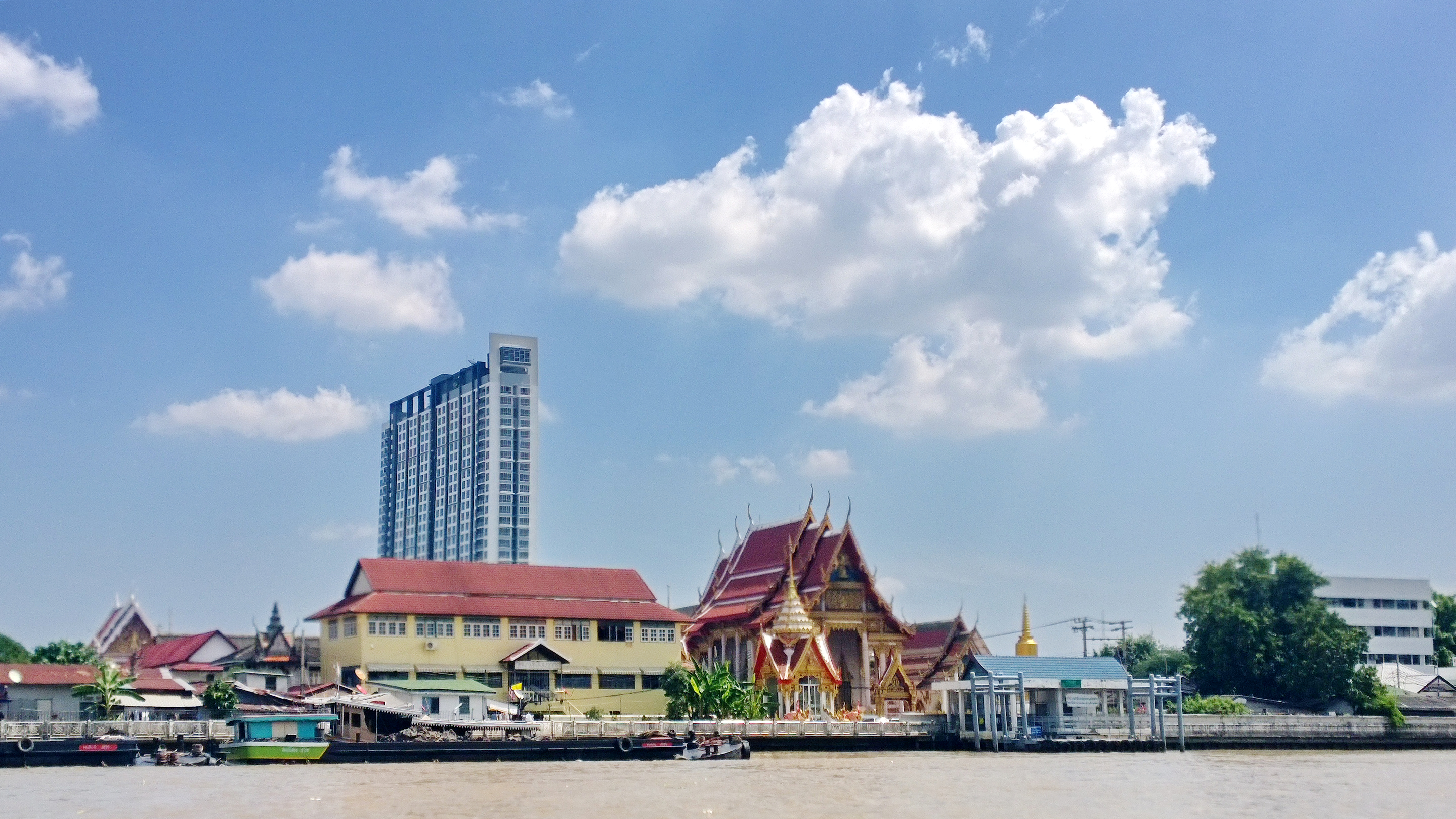
- Wat Bang Pho Omawat, Bang Sue District

- Khet location in Bangkok
- Coordinates: 13°48′35″N 100°32′14″E
- Country: Thailand
- Province: Bangkok
- Seat: Bang Sue
- Khwaeng: 2

Area
  - Total: 11.545 km^{2} (4.458 sq mi)

Population (2017)
  - Total: 125,440
  - Density: 10,907.82/km^{2} (28,251.1/sq mi)
- Time zone: UTC+7 (ICT)
- Postal code: 10800
- Geocode: 1029

Bang Sue (Thai: บางซื่อ, pronounced [bāːŋ sɯ̂ː]) is one of the 50 districts (khet) of Bangkok, Thailand. It borders Chatuchak to the east, Phaya Thai to the southeast, Dusit to the south, Bang Phlat and Bang Kruai across the Chao Phraya to the west and Mueang Nonthaburi to the north.

== History ==
Bang Sue was one of eight outer Bangkok amphoes (districts) established during King Chulalongkorn's reign.

In an administrative reform in 1938, Bang Sue was reduced from an amphoe to a tambon (sub-district), becoming part of Dusit district. In 1972, as part of the creation of a special administrative area of Bangkok where tambons in Bangkok were renamed khwaengs and amphoes in Bangkok were renamed khets, Bang Sue became Khwaeng Bang Sue under Khet Dusit. Bang Sue became a khet in 1989.

"Bang Sue" means "community of the faithful". The name appears in Journey to Phrabat, a poem by Sunthorn Phu written in 1807.

According to regional folklore, the name originates from the "Story of Lord Uthong". When someone asked about the hidden treasure of Lord Uthong (a mythical king, not the King Uthong of Ayutthaya), the locals responded with honesty.

Bang Pho is the historic area along the Chao Phraya River. In the 18th century, corresponding to the early Rattanakosin era, used to be a settlement for Annamese (presently known Vietnamese) immigrants.

== Places ==
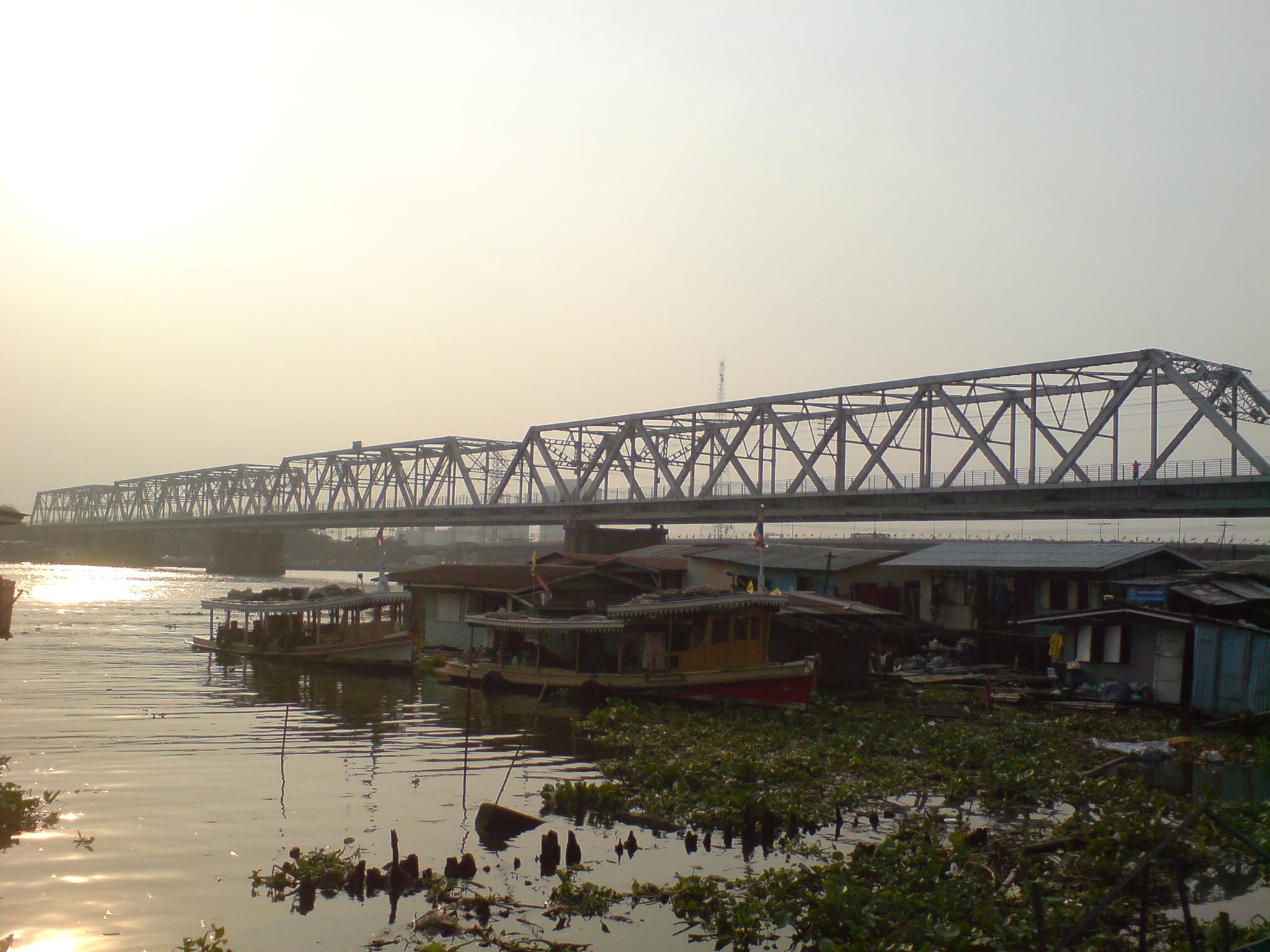
Rama VI Bridge

Rama VI Bridge was the first bridge to cross the Chao Phraya River. It was opened on 1 January 1923 and was named after King Vajiravudh (Rama VI). The 442 metre (1450 ft) long and 10 metre (33) wide road-rail bridge originally carried a single-track railway to the west and south of Thailand and a one-lane road.

During World War II the bridge was heavily damaged by Allied bombing, since it was being used by the occupying Japanese. The reconstructed bridge was re-opened on 12 December 1953. In 1992, road traffic was permanently diverted to the new Rama VII bridge slightly upstream as the State Railway of Thailand converted the roadway to a second railway track.

== Transport ==
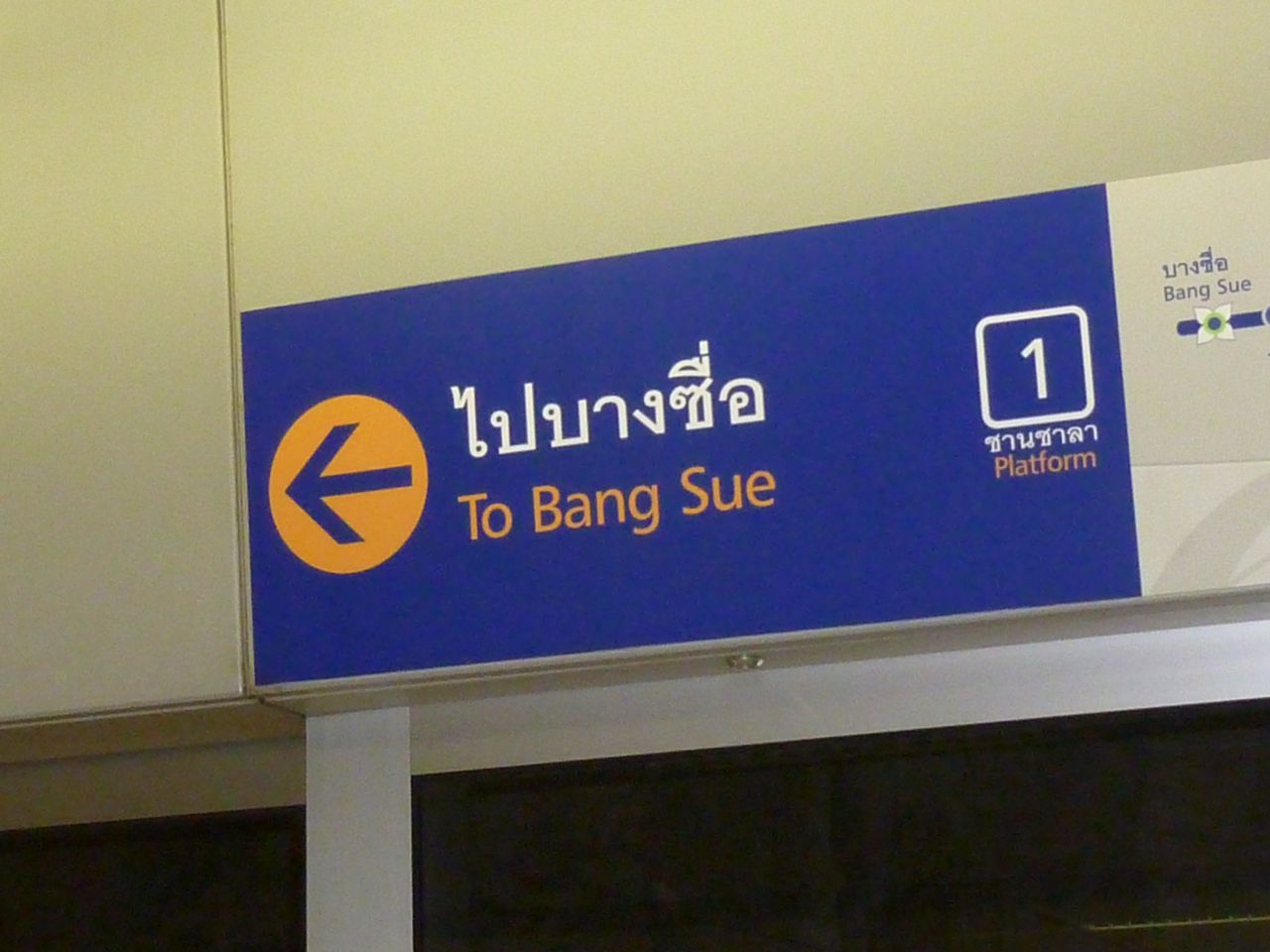
Metro Station sign on the Blue Line of the Bangkok MRT

Bang Sue District hosts a MRT Blue Line station at Bang Sue MRT station, the interchange station between the Blue Line and MRT Purple Line at Tao Poon MRT station and Purple Line Bang Son and Wong Sawang stations.

State Railway of Thailand (SRT) trains serve the Bang Sue Junction Railway Station.

The district is the site of a current central station for Bangkok, Krung Thep Aphiwat Central Terminal, along with a new business district. Three separate subway lines are connected the station to other districts in Bangkok. Indeed, it is located in a neighbouring area, Chatuchak Subdistrict of Chatuchak District.

== Administration ==
The district is divided into two sub-districts (khwaeng).

No.	Name	Thai	Area (km^{2})	Map
1.	Bang Sue	บางซื่อ	5.762	Map
2.	Wong Sawang	วงศ์สว่าง	5.783	Map
Total			11.545	Map
