= Tao Poon =

Neighbourhood in Bangkok, Thailand

Coordinates: 13°48′22″N 100°31′50″E

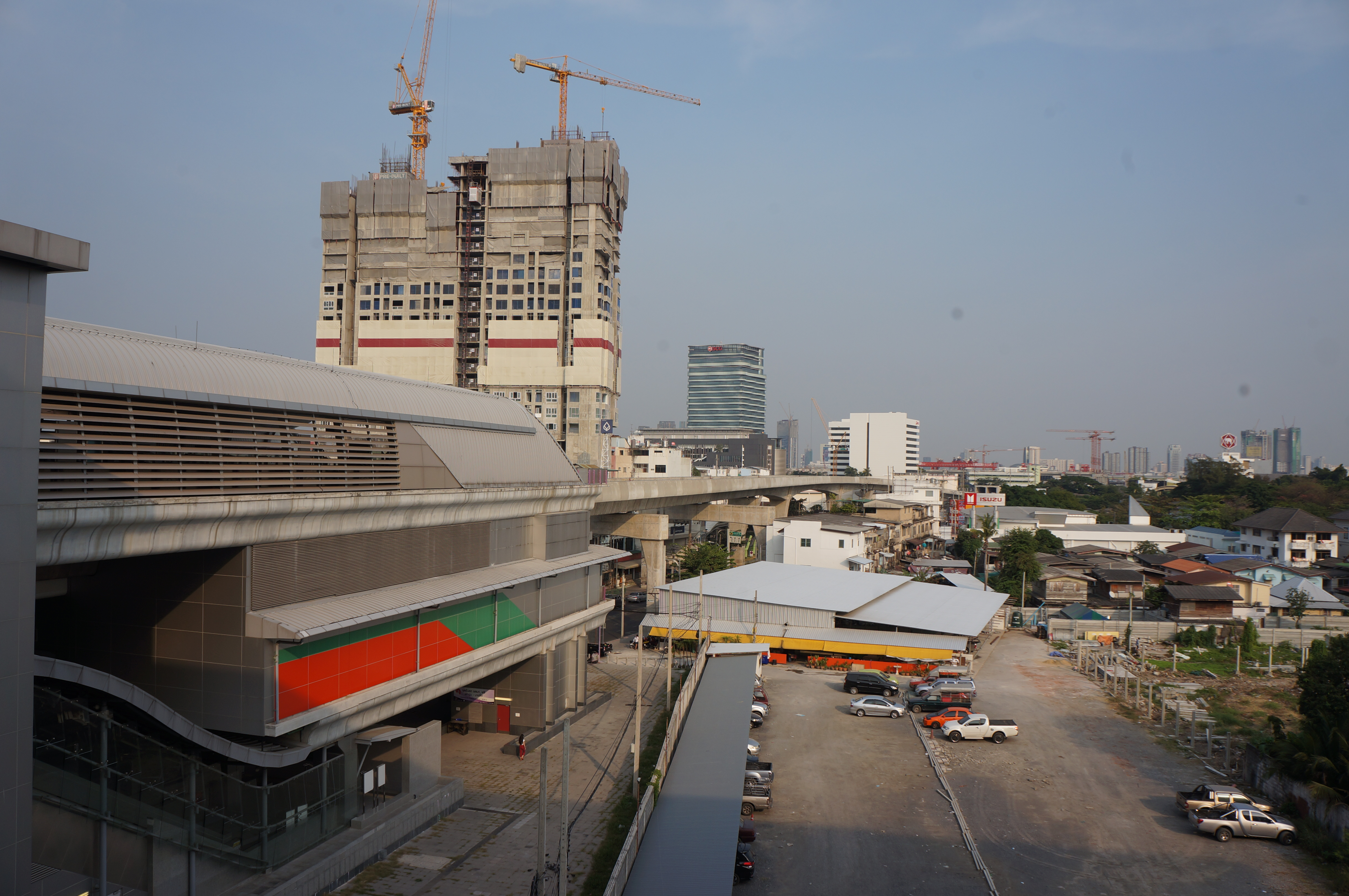
The elevated tracks of the Blue Line, under construction in 2017, viewed from Tao Poon station towards the Siam Cement Group headquarters

Tao Poon (Thai: เตาปูน, RTGS: Tao Pun, lit. 'cement kiln') is a neighbourhood in Bangkok's Bang Sue district. It is named after the country's first cement factory, established in 1913 by the Siam Cement Company, whose corporate headquarters are still located here, adjacent to Bang Sue Junction railway station on the station's west side. Today, the name most specifically refers to the area around Tao Pun Junction, where Krung Thep–Nonthaburi Road meets Pracharat Sai Song Road beneath the elevated Tao Poon MRT station, which connects the Blue Line and Purple Line.
