= Bang Yai =

Bang Yai may refer to:

- Bang Yai District in Nonthaburi Province, Thailand
  - Bang Yai Subdistrict, Nonthaburi, within the district
  - Sao Thong Hin, a municipality and subdistrict within the district, and its current administrative centre, the area of which is commonly referred to as Bang Yai
    - Sam Yaek Bang Yai MRT station, which serves the area
    - Talad Bang Yai MRT station, which also serves the area
