= Wat Puranawat =

Buddhist temple in Bangkok, Thailand

Coordinates: 13.80333°N 100.33563°E

Wat Puranawat (Thai: วัดปุรณาวาส) is a private Buddhist temple in suburb Bangkok, situated on the bank of Khlong Maha Sawat in the area of Sala Thammasop in Thawi Watthana District, considered as a temple on the northwesternmost of Bangkok. Across Khlong Maha Sawat is the area of Tambon Sala Klang, Bang Kruai District of Nonthaburi Province, while Tambon Salaya, Phutthamonthon District of Nakhon Pathom Province is not far from here.

The monastery was built in 1854 during the King Mongkut (Rama IV)'s reign. Formerly called Wat Nok (วัดนก) and sometimes called Wat Klang Khlong (วัดกลางคลอง), the temple was recorded that King Mongkut has Khlong Maha Sawat dug and visit the construction site, he joined with a man called Mr. Bun in contribution to build the monk's dwelling and named the temple as Wat Ratchabuntham (วัดราชบุญธรรม). The name was later changed to Wat Bunyawat Ratchasatthatham (วัดบุญญาวาสน์ราชศรัทธาธรรม). In 1937, the temple was again renamed to Wat Puranawat in present day.

The temple there are three valuable ancient object of Buddha images called Luang Pho In (หลวงพ่ออินทร์) and Luang Pho Chan (หลวงพ่อจันทร์), as well as a figure of Buddha during difficult deeds enshrined in the temple. The temple has undergone major restoration by the Yongchaiyudh family, whose family members include General Chavalit Yongchaiyudh, the 22nd Prime Minister of Thailand.

Besides, Wat Puranawat School, a secondary school on the land of the temple, it was also the home of Bangkok Local Museum Thawi Watthana District. Both school and museum are opposite the temple, bisected by southern railway line.
