= Wat Khangkhao =

Buddhist temple in Thailand

- วัดค้างคาว
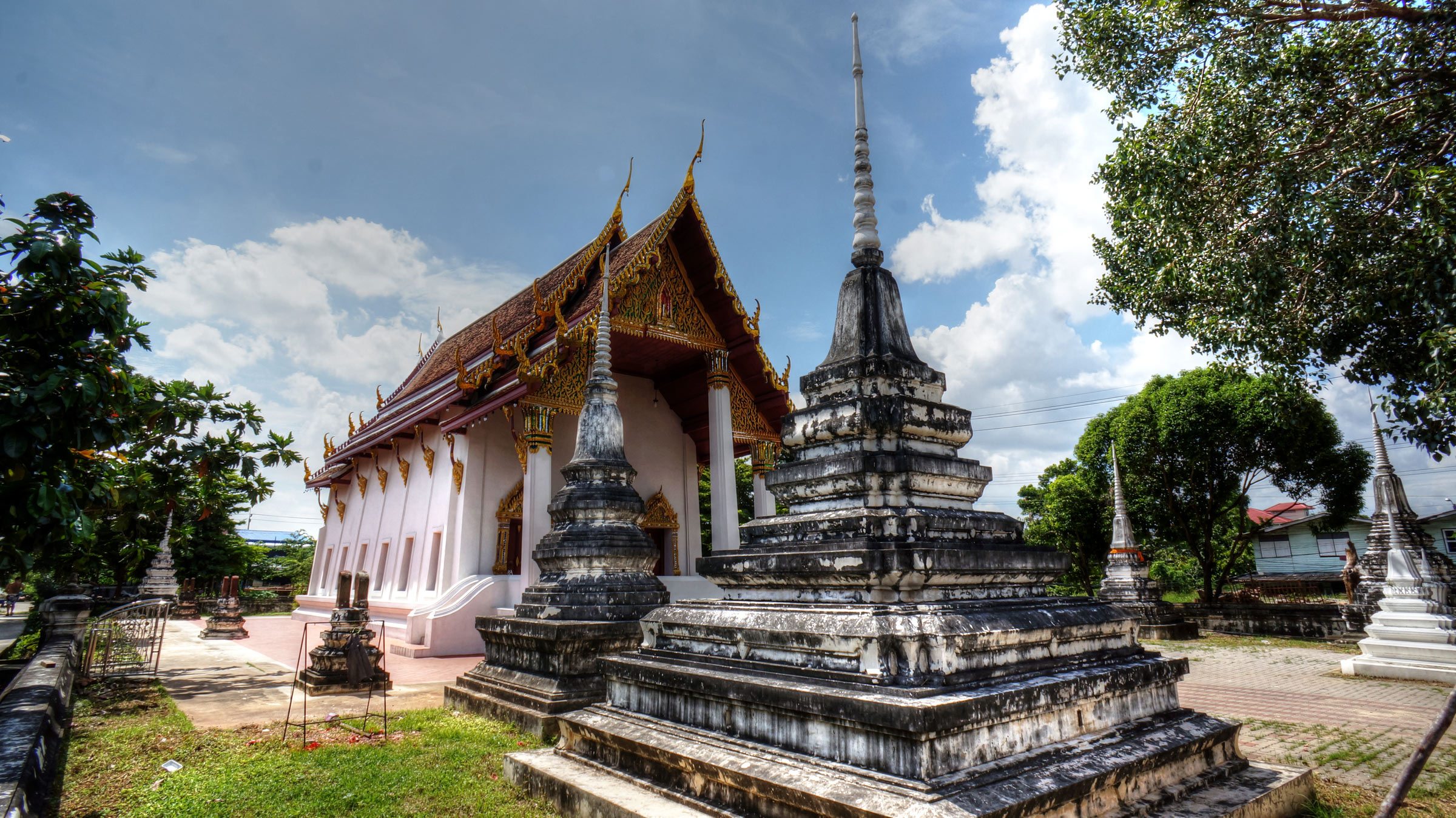
- The ordination hall

Religion
- Affiliation: Buddhism
- Sect: Theravāda Mahā Nikāya
- Status: Private temple

Location
- Location: 138, Moo 4, Soi Bang Phai 10, Bang Phai Phatthana–Yaek Wat Tuek Rd, Bang Phai, Mueang Nonthaburi, Nonthaburi, 11000
- Country: Thailand
- Interactive map of Wat Khangkhao
- Coordinates: 13.819817°N 100.498992°E

Architecture
- Founder: Unknown

Wat Khangkhao (Thai: วัดค้างคาว) is a historic Buddhist temple on the west side of the Chao Phraya River, opposite Wat Khema Phirataram on the east side, Nonthaburi Province.

Its origins date back to the reign of Trailok (สมเด็จพระบรมไตรโลกนาถ), a 15th-century Ayutthaya era king. Outside ordination hall feature 16 red sema (temple boundary stone) sandstones, these stones presumed built in the time of Ban Phu Luang dynasty period (between 1688–1767).

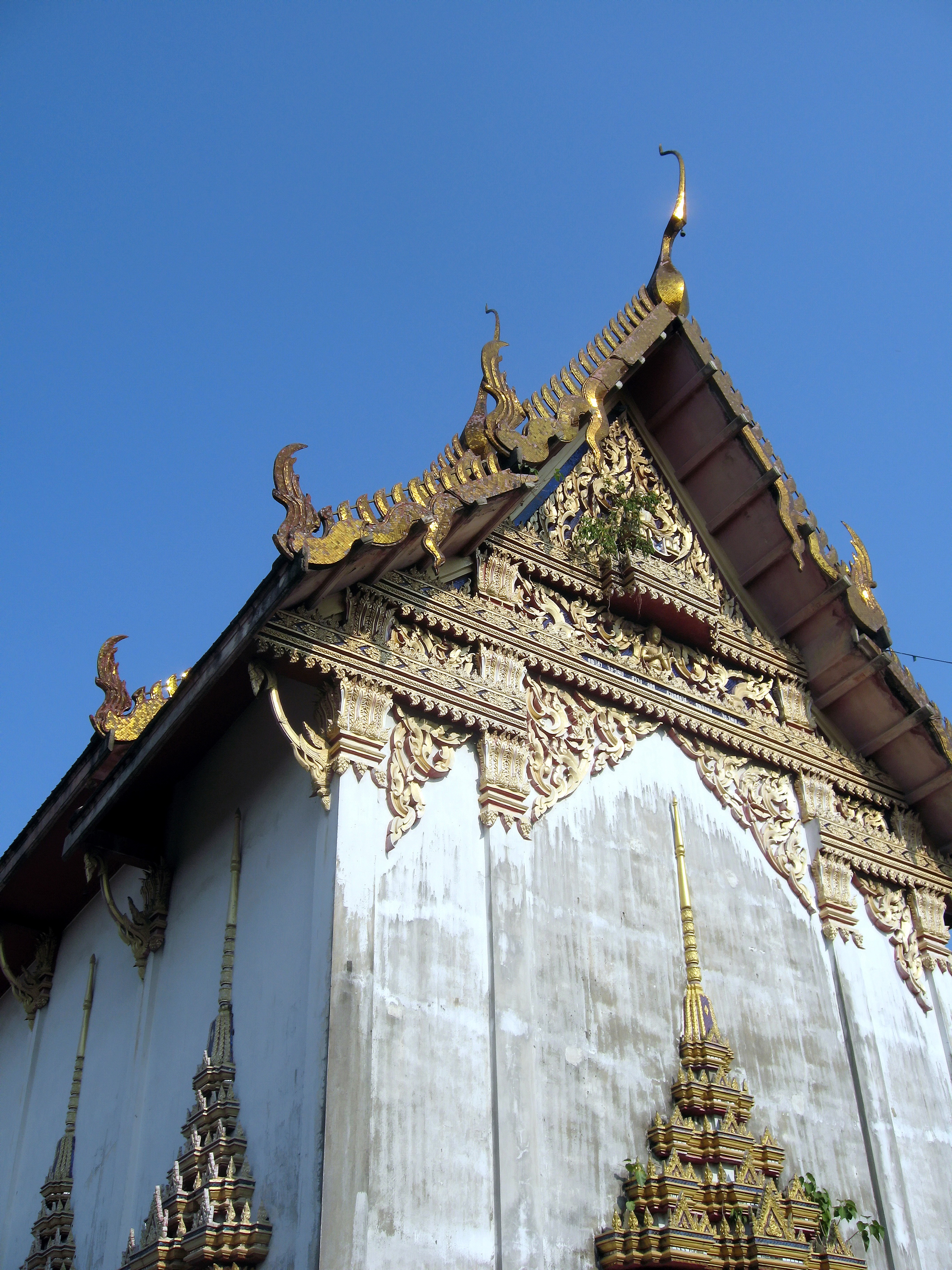
Outside the ordination hall

The front is enshrined a crowned standing stucco Buddha image named "Luang Pho Kao" (หลวงพ่อเก้า). It is characterized by the fingers of the left hand that looked like they only had four fingers, hence the name "Luang Pho Kao" (reverend father nine), referring to its characteristic. The Buddha image is said to be very sacred, therefore, it is worshiped by the general public.

Another singularity of this hall is the presence of a Buddha footprint directly attached to the wall facing the principle image.

The temple name translates to "Bat Temple" as it used to be inhabited by large bat colonies in the past.

Currently, the temple has been almost completely renovated, but still maintains the shady and tranquility as in the past.

The temple has been registered as a national historic site by the Fine Arts Department since 1993.
