= Natthawut Ponglangka =

Thai journalist

- ณัฐวุฒิ ปงลังกา
- Born: 14 September 1990; Chiang Rai, Thailand
- Died: 30 November 2025 (aged 35); Bang Kruai District, Nonthaburi Province, Thailand

Natthawut Ponglangka (Thai: ณัฐวุฒิ ปงลังกา) was a Thai journalist.

== Career ==
Natthawut was a reporter for Channel 8 news. In 2025, he received the Thep Narai Nakarat Award for Outstanding Field Reporter.

== Death ==
Natthawut was found dead on 30 November 2025. On 6 December 2025, Thailand's Central Institute of Forensic Science released a toxicology report showing fatal levels of cyanide were found in his stomach and bloodstream.

On 14 December 2025, Natthawut's death was ruled a suicide.
