= Bang Muang, Nonthaburi =

Bang Muang Subdistrict ตำบลบางม่วง
- Subdistrict
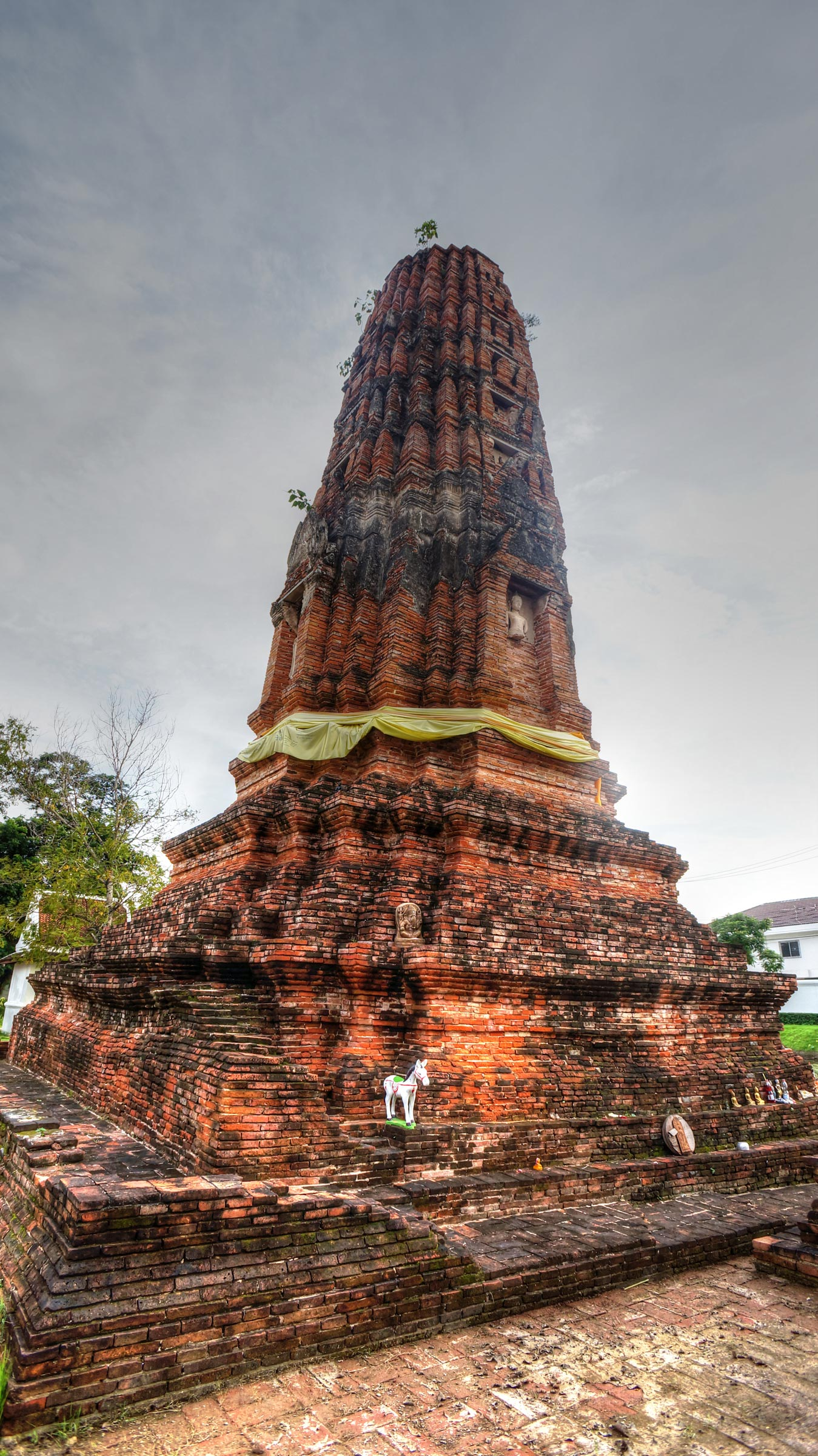
- The prang of Wat Prang Luang, one of the oldest temples in Nonthaburi Province and Bangkok Metropolitan Region
- Interactive map of Bang Muang Subdistrict
- Country: Thailand
- Province: Nonthaburi
- District: Bang Yai

Population (2020)
  - Total: 19,518
- Time zone: UTC+7 (ICT)
- Postal code: 11140
- TIS 1099: 120301

Bang Muang (Thai: บางม่วง, pronounced [bāːŋ mûa̯ŋ]) is one of the six subdistricts (tambon) of Bang Yai District, in Nonthaburi Province, Thailand. Neighbouring subdistricts are (from north clockwise) Bang Mae Nang, Sao Thong Hin, Bang Len, Bang Khu Wiang, Plai Bang, Sala Klang and Bang Yai. In 2020, it had a total population of 19,518 people.

== Administration ==
=== Central administration ===
The subdistrict is subdivided into 15 administrative villages (muban).

No.	Name	Thai
1.	Ban Prang Luang (Ban Ban Muang)	บ้านปรางค์หลวง (บ้านบางม่วง)
2.	Ban Lang Wat Phikun Ngoen (Ban Ban Muang)	บ้านหลังวัดพิกุลเงิน (บ้านบางม่วง)
3.	Ban Ban Muang	บ้านบางม่วง
4.	Ban Ban Muang	บ้านบางม่วง
5.	Ban Khlong Bang Sano (Ban Bang Sano)	บ้านคลองบางโสน (บ้านบางโสน)
6.	Ban Bang Sano Noi (Ban Bang Sano)	บ้านบางโสนน้อย (บ้านบางโสน)
7.	Ban Hua Khu Nai	บ้านหัวคูใน
8.	Ban Hua Khu Nok	บ้านหัวคูนอก
9.	Ban Bang Krang	บ้านบางกร่าง
10.	Ban Nak Kiao	บ้านนาคเกี้ยว
11.	Ban Bang Muang	บ้านบางม่วง
12.	Ban Khlong Yai Chap (Ban Bang Muang)	บ้านคลองยายจับ (บ้านบางม่วง)
13.	Ban Khlong Khwang (Ban Bang Muang)	บ้านคลองขวาง (บ้านบางม่วง)
14.	Ban Khlong Lat	บ้านคลองลัด
15.	Ban Bang Sano Phatthana 2	บ้านบางโสนพัฒนา 2

=== Local administration ===
The area of the subdistrict is shared by two local administrative organizations.

- Bang Muang Subdistrict Municipality (เทศบาลตำบลบางม่วง)
- Ban Bang Muang Subdistrict Municipality (เทศบาลตำบลบ้านบางม่วง)
