= Nong Phrao Ngai =

Nong Phrao Ngai Subdistrict ตำบลหนองเพรางาย
- Subdistrict
- Interactive map of Nong Phrao Ngai Subdistrict
- Country: Thailand
- Province: Nonthaburi
- District: Sai Noi

Area
  - Total: 27.386 km^{2} (10.574 sq mi)

Population (2020)
  - Total: 7,595
  - Density: 277.33/km^{2} (718.3/sq mi)
- Time zone: UTC+7 (ICT)
- Postal code: 11150
- TIS 1099: 120503

Nong Phrao Ngai (Thai: หนองเพรางาย, pronounced [nɔ̌ːŋ pʰrāw ŋāːj]) is one of the seven subdistricts (tambon) of Sai Noi District, in Nonthaburi Province, Thailand. Neighbouring subdistricts are (from north clockwise) Thawi Watthana, Bang Khu Rat, Ban Mai, Khlong Yong and Naraphirom. In 2020 it had a total population of 7,595 people.

== Administration ==
=== Central administration ===
The subdistrict is subdivided into 12 administrative villages (muban).

No.	Name	Thai
1.	Ban Mai	บ้านใหม่
2.	Ban Khlong Param (Ban Nong Param)	บ้านคลองปะรำ (บ้านหนองปะรำ)
3.	Ban Talat Makluea (Ban Khlong Makluea)	บ้านตลาดมะเกลือ (บ้านคลองมะเกลือ)
4.	Ban Nong Bua (Ban Nong Thap)	บ้านหนองบัว (บ้านหนองทับ)
5.	Ban Naraphirom	บ้านนราภิรมย์
6.	Ban Na Luang	บ้านนาหลวง
7.	Ban Nong Sam Bat	บ้านหนองสามบาท
8.	Ban Khlong Sahakon (Ban Sahakon)	บ้านคลองสหกรณ์ (บ้านสหกรณ์)
9.	Ban Nong Thap	บ้านหนองทับ
10.	Ban Khamen	บ้านเขมร
11.	Ban Khlong Naraphirom	บ้านคลองนราภิรมย์
12.	Ban Khu Khlong Khwang (Ban Kut Khlong Khwang)	บ้านคู้คลองขวาง (บ้านกุ้ดคลองขวาง)

=== Local administration ===
The whole area of the subdistrict is covered by Nong Phrao Ngai Subdistrict Administrative Organization (องค์การบริหารส่วนตำบลหนองเพรางาย).
