= Bang Rak Phatthana =

Bang Rak Phatthana Subdistrict ตำบลบางรักพัฒนา
- Subdistrict
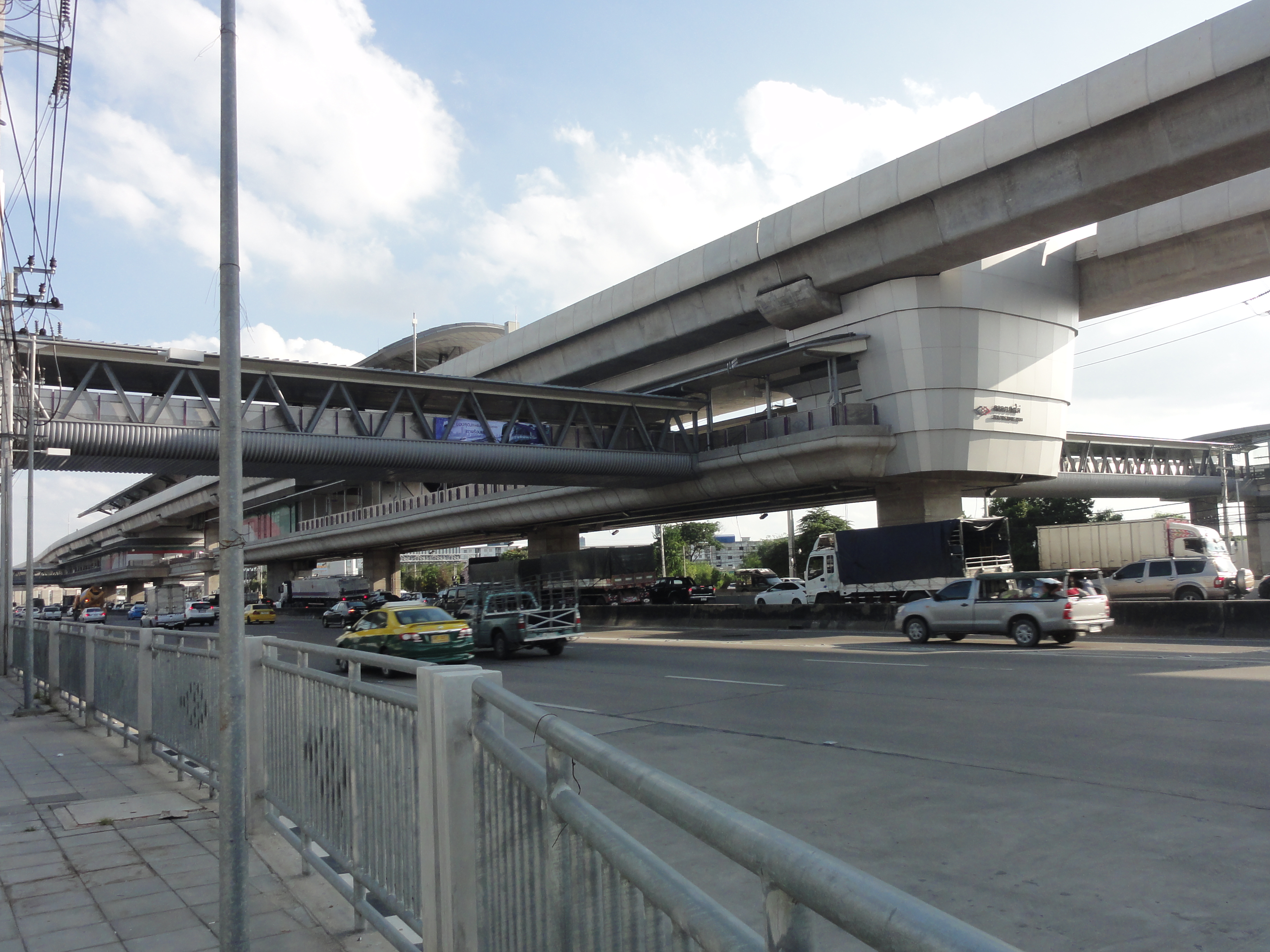
- Khlong Bang Phai MRT station and Kanchanaphisek Road in the subdistrict

- Location within Bangkok Location within Thailand
- Country: Thailand
- Province: Nonthaburi
- District: Bang Bua Thong

Population (2020)
  - Total: 73,369
- Time zone: UTC+7 (ICT)
- Postal code: 11110
- TIS 1099: 120408

Bang Rak Phatthana (Thai: บางรักพัฒนา, pronounced [bāːŋ rák pʰát.tʰā.nāː]) is one of the eight subdistricts (tambon) of Bang Bua Thong District, in Nonthaburi Province, Thailand. Neighbouring subdistricts are (clockwise from north) Phimon Rat, Om Kret, Bang Rak Noi, Bang Rak Yai, Sao Thong Hin, Bang Mae Nang and Bang Khu Rat. In 2020, it had a total population of 73,369 people.

== Administration ==
=== Central administration ===
The subdistrict is subdivided into 15 administrative villages (muban).

No.	Name	Thai
1.	Ban Nong Bua	บ้านหนองบัว
2.	Ban Khlong Bang Phraek	บ้านคลองบางแพรก
3.	Ban Khlong Nio Khom (Ban Nio Khom)	บ้านคลองนิ้วค่อม (บ้านนิ้วค่อม)
4.	Ban Bang Phraek (Ban Khlong Bang Phraek)	บ้านบางแพรก (บ้านคลองบางแพรก)
5.	Ban Khlong Bang Phai (Ban Bang Phai)	บ้านคลองบางไผ่ (บ้านบางไผ่)
6.	Ban Sano Loi (Ban Ao Krathon)	บ้านโสนลอย (บ้านอ่าวกระท้อน)
7.	Ban Lat Pla Duk (Ban Plai Khlong Bang Phai)	บ้านลาดปลาดุก (บ้านปลายคลองบางไผ่)
8.	Ban Khlong Wat Lat Pla Duk	บ้านคลองวัดลาดปลาดุก
9.	Ban Ubon Kan	บ้านอุบลกาญจน์
10.	Ban Bua Thong	บ้านบัวทอง
11.	Ban Plai Khlong Bang Phraek (Ban Khlong Bang Phraek Ton Plai)	บ้านปลายคลองบางแพรก (บ้านคลองบางแพรกตอนปลาย)
12.	Ban Rattanathibet (Ban Rattanaphirom)	บ้านรัตนาธิเบศร์ (บ้านรัตนาภิรมย์)
13.	Ban Udom Buri	บ้านอุดมบุรี
14.	Ban Kritsada	บ้านกฤษดา
15.	Ban Rung Rueang	บ้านรุ่งเรือง

=== Local administration ===
The area of the subdistrict is shared by two local administrative organizations.

- Bang Rak Phatthana Town Municipality (เทศบาลเมืองบางรักพัฒนา)
- Bang Bua Thong Town Municipality (เทศบาลเมืองบางบัวทอง)
