= Ban Mai, Bang Yai =

Ban Mai Subdistrict ตำบลบ้านใหม่
- Subdistrict
- Interactive map of Ban Mai Subdistrict
- Coordinates: 13.8773°N 100.3316°E
- Country: Thailand
- Province: Nonthaburi
- District: Bang Yai

Population (2020)
  - Total: 9,206
- Time zone: UTC+7 (ICT)
- Postal code: 11140
- TIS 1099: 120306

Ban Mai (Thai: บ้านใหม่, pronounced [bâːn màj]) is one of the six subdistricts (tambon) of Bang Yai District, in Nonthaburi Province, Thailand. Neighbouring subdistricts are (from north clockwise) Nong Phrao Ngai, Bang Khu Rat, Bang Mae Nang, Bang Yai and Khlong Yong. In 2020, it had a total population of 9,206 people.

== Administration ==
=== Central administration ===
The subdistrict is subdivided into 11 administrative villages (muban).

No.	Name	Thai
1.	Ban Khlong Lum Li (Ban Khlong Phuyai Chan)	บ้านคลองหลุมลี (บ้านคลองผู้ใหญ่ชั้น)
2.	Ban Khlong Bang I Lue (Ban Chao)	บ้านคลองบางอีลือ (บ้านเจ้า)
3.	Ban Khlong Ta Daeng	บ้านคลองตาแดง
4.	Ban Wat Ton Chueak	บ้านวัดต้นเชือก
5.	Ban Khlong Phai Khat (Ban Nong Phai Khat)	บ้านคลองไผ่ขาด (บ้านหนองไผ่ขาด)
6.	Ban Si Yaek Khlong Yong	บ้านสี่แยกคลองโยง
7.	Ban Khlong Thawi Watthana (Ban Sahakon)	บ้านคลองทวีวัฒนา (บ้านสหกรณ์)
8.	Ban Don Talumphuk	บ้านดอนตะลุมพุก
9.	Ban Khlong Wa Diao	บ้านคลองวาเดียว
10.	Ban Khlong Rat Prasoet (Ban Rat Prasoet)	บ้านคลองราษฎร์ประเสริฐ (บ้านราษฎร์ประเสริฐ)
11.	Ban Sam Yaek Bang Khu Lat (Ban Bang Khu Lat)	บ้านสามแยกบางคูลัด (บ้านบางคูลัด)

=== Local administration ===
The area of the subdistrict is shared by two local administrative organizations.

- Bang Yai Subdistrict Municipality (เทศบาลตำบลบางใหญ่)
- Ban Mai Subdistrict Administrative Organization (องค์การบริหารส่วนตำบลบ้านใหม่)
