= Bang Khun Kong =

Bang Khun Kong Subdistrict ตำบลบางขุนกอง
- Subdistrict
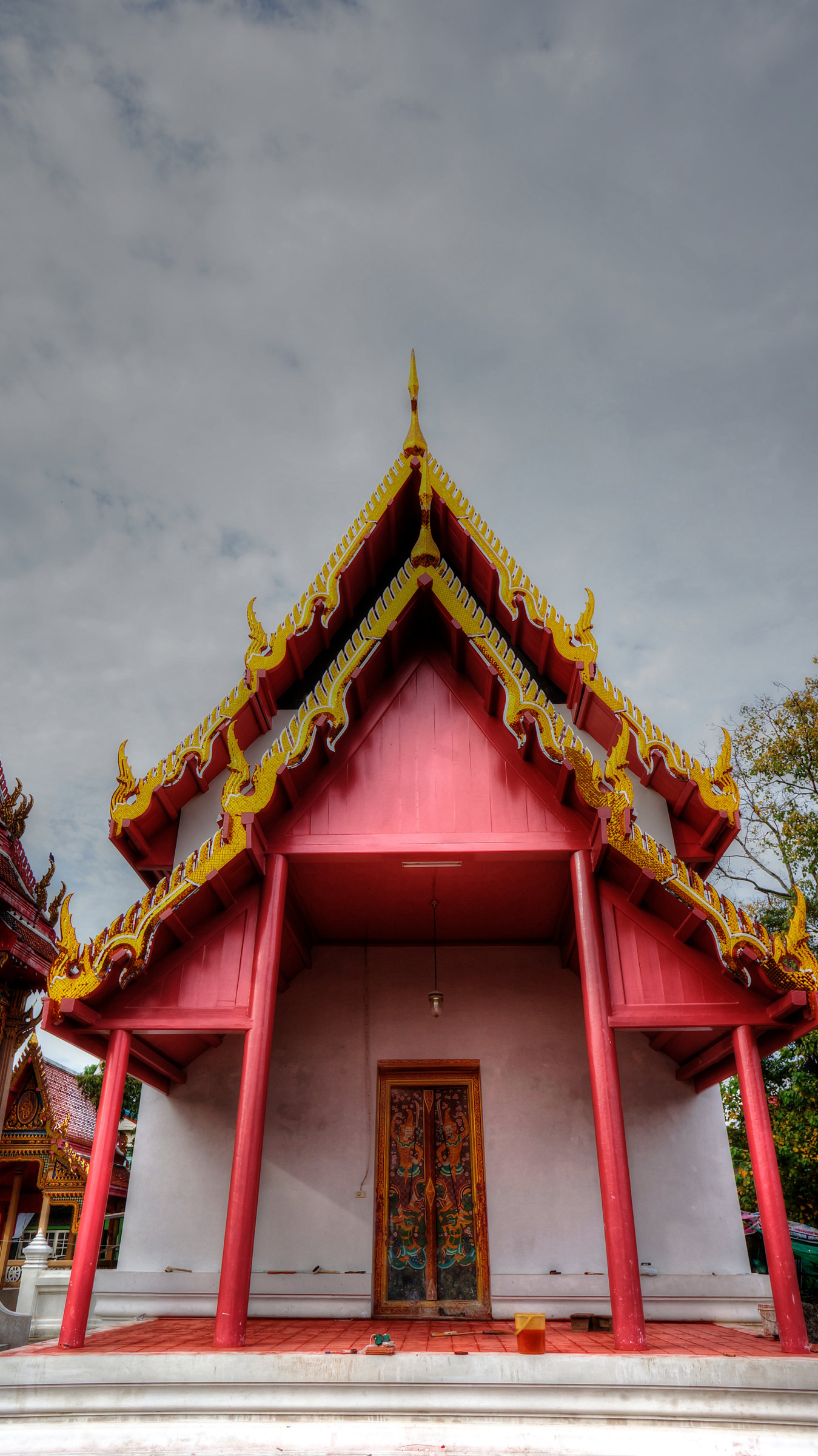
- The old ubosot of Wat Bang Krai Nai
- Interactive map of Bang Khun Kong Subdistrict
- Country: Thailand
- Province: Nonthaburi
- District: Bang Kruai

Area
  - Total: 6.09 km^{2} (2.35 sq mi)

Population (2020)
  - Total: 11,171
  - Density: 1,834.32/km^{2} (4,750.9/sq mi)
- Time zone: UTC+7 (ICT)
- Postal code: 11130
- TIS 1099: 120205

Bang Khun Kong (Thai: บางขุนกอง, pronounced [bāːŋ kʰǔn kɔ̄ːŋ]) is one of the nine subdistricts (tambon) of Bang Kruai District, in Nonthaburi Province, Thailand. The subdistrict is bounded by (clockwise from north) Bang Krang, Bang Khanun, Maha Sawat and Bang Khu Wiang subdistricts. In 2020, it had a total population of 11,171 people.

== Administration ==
=== Central administration ===
The subdistrict is subdivided into 6 administrative villages (muban).

No.	Name	Thai
1.	Ban Khlong Bang Khun Kong	บ้านคลองบางขุนกอง
2.	Ban Wat Song Phlu	บ้านวัดซองพลู
3.	Ban Wat Thai Charoen	บ้านวัดไทยเจริญ
4.	Ban Bang Nai Krai	บ้านบางนายไกร
5.	Ban Wat Utthayan	บ้านวัดอุทยาน
6.	Ban Khlong Bang Rao Nok	บ้านคลองบางราวนก

=== Local administration ===
The whole area of the subdistrict is covered by Bang Khun Kong Subdistrict Administrative Organization (องค์การบริหารส่วนตำบลบางขุนกอง).
