= Sai Ma =

Sai Ma Subdistrict ตำบลไทรม้า
- Subdistrict
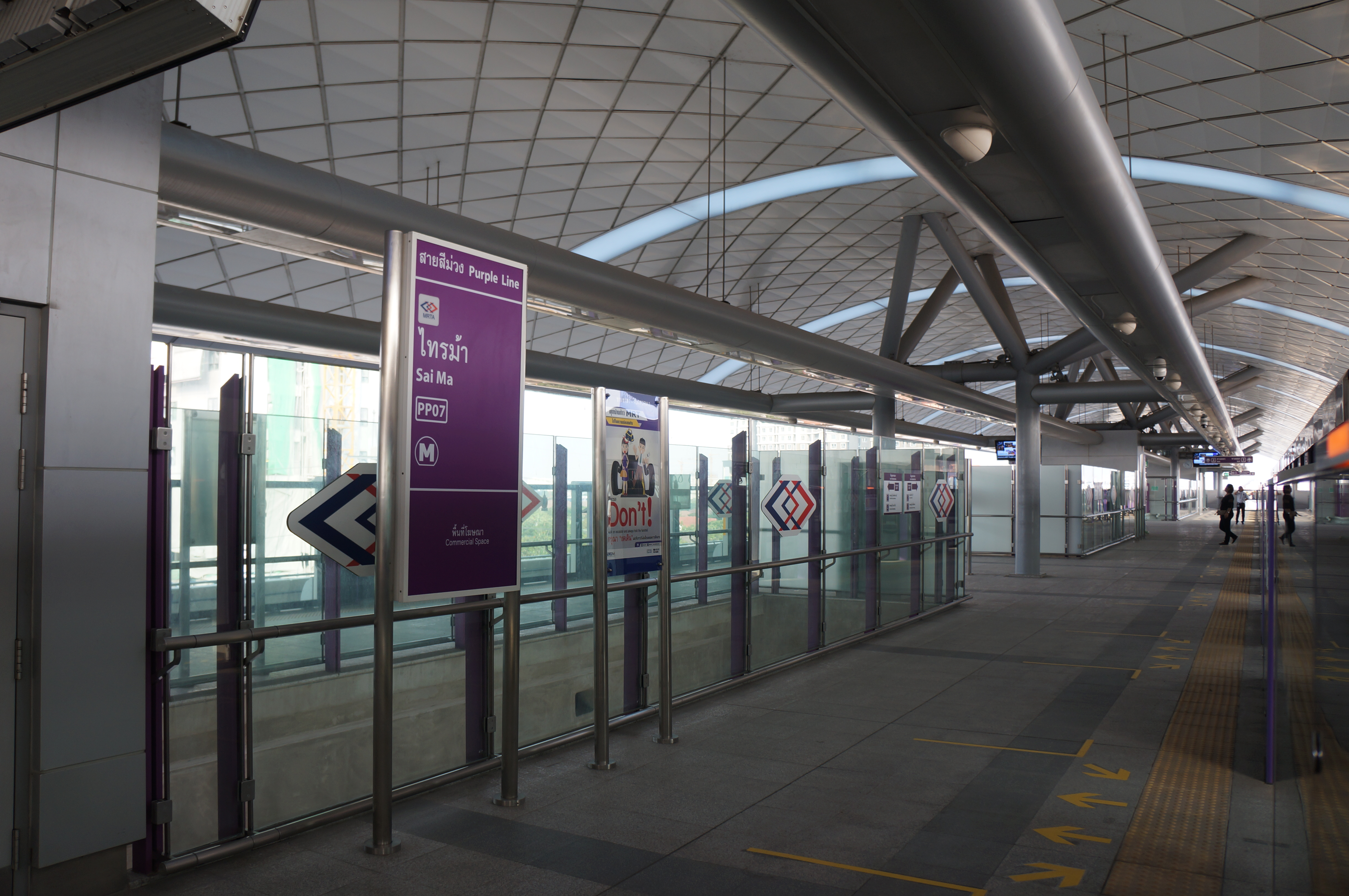
- Sai Ma MRT station
- Interactive map of Sai Ma Subdistrict
- Country: Thailand
- Province: Nonthaburi
- District: Mueang Nonthaburi

Area
  - Total: 8.14 km^{2} (3.14 sq mi)

Population (2020)
  - Total: 23,742
  - Density: 2,916.71/km^{2} (7,554.2/sq mi)
- Time zone: UTC+7 (ICT)
- Postal code: 11000
- TIS 1099: 120109

Sai Ma (Thai: ไทรม้า, pronounced [sāj máː]) is one of the ten subdistricts (tambon) of Mueang Nonthaburi District, in Nonthaburi Province, Thailand. Neighbouring subdistricts are (from north clockwise) Tha It, Bang Kraso, Suan Yai (across the Chao Phraya River), Bang Si Mueang, Bang Krang and Bang Rak Noi. In 2020 it had a total population of 23,742 people.

== Administration ==
=== Central administration ===
The subdistrict is subdivided into 6 administrative villages (muban).

No.	Name	Thai
1.	Ban Wat Daeng	บ้านวัดแดง
2.	Ban Khlong Bang Kamlang	บ้านคลองบางกำลัง
3.	Ban Khlong Lum Madan	บ้านคลองหลุมมะดัน
4.	Ban Sai Ma Nuea	บ้านไทรม้าเหนือ
5.	Ban Sai Ma Tai	บ้านไทรม้าใต้
6.	Ban Bang Pradu	บ้านบางประดู่

=== Local administration ===
The whole area of the subdistrict is covered by Sai Ma Town Municipality (เทศบาลเมืองไทรม้า).
