= Plai Bang =

Plai Bang Subdistrict ตำบลปลายบาง
- Subdistrict
- Interactive map of Plai Bang Subdistrict
- Country: Thailand
- Province: Nonthaburi
- District: Bang Kruai

Population (2020)
  - Total: 19,358
- Time zone: UTC+7 (ICT)
- Postal code: 11130
- TIS 1099: 120208

Plai Bang (Thai: ปลายบาง, pronounced [plāːj bāːŋ]) is one of the nine subdistricts (tambon) of Bang Kruai District, in Nonthaburi Province, Thailand. Neighbouring subdistricts are (from north clockwise) Bang Muang, Bang Khu Wiang, Maha Sawat, Chimphli, Sala Thammasop and Sala Klang. In 2020 it had a total population of 19,358 people.

== Administration ==
=== Central administration ===
The subdistrict is subdivided into 5 administrative villages (muban).

No.	Name	Thai
1.	Ban Talat Si Prawat	บ้านตลาดศรีประวัติ
2.	Ban Khlong Khue Khwang	บ้านคลองขื่อขวาง
3.	Ban Khlong Plai Bang	บ้านคลองปลายบาง
4.	Ban Hua Khu Nok	บ้านหัวคูนอก
5.	Ban Hua Khu Nok	บ้านหัวคูนอก

=== Local administration ===
The whole area of the subdistrict is covered by Plai Bang Subdistrict Municipality (เทศบาลตำบลปลายบาง).
