= Bang Krang =

Bang Krang Subdistrict ตำบลบางกร่าง
- Subdistrict
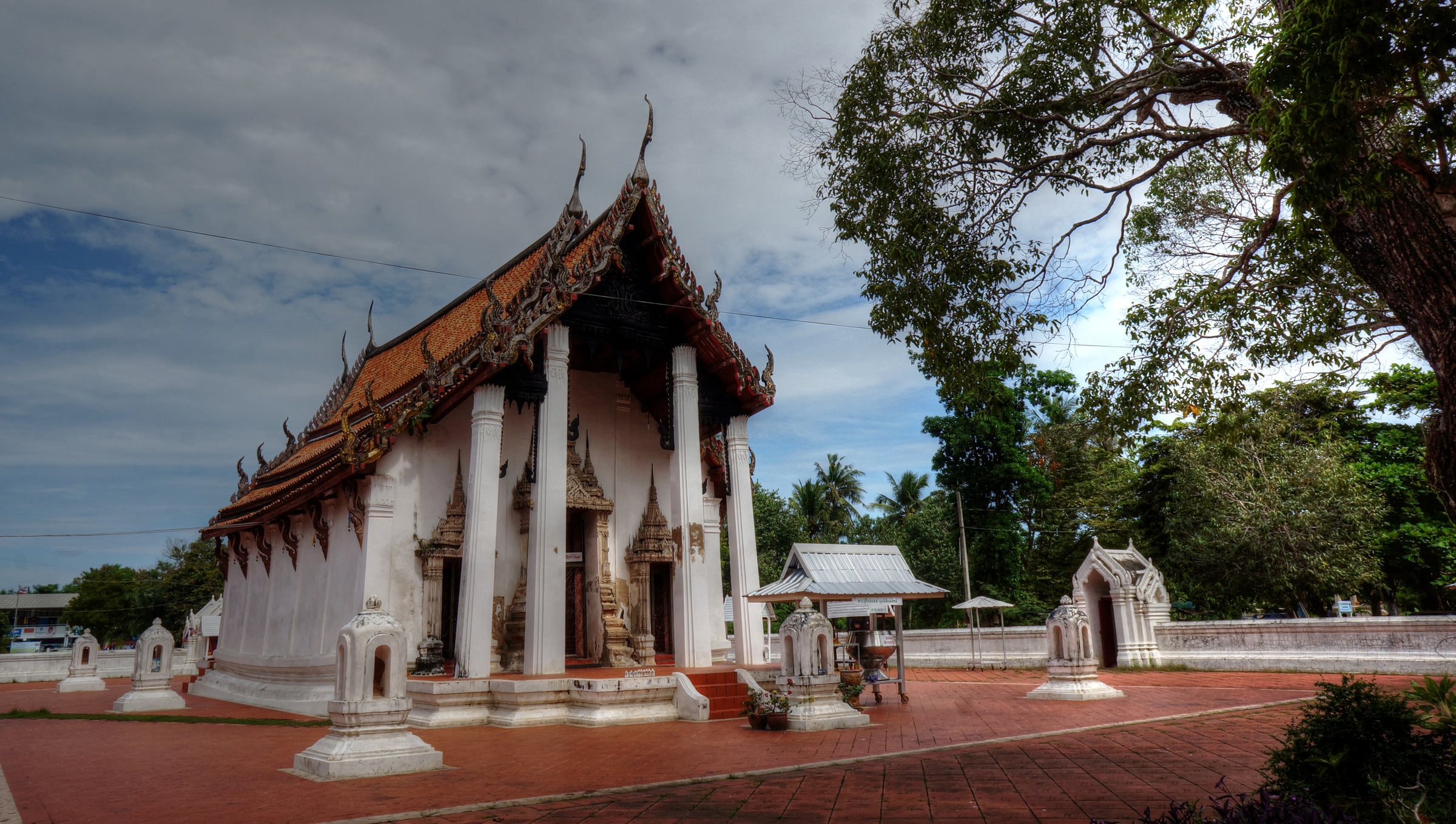
- Wat Prasat in Bang Krang boasts the oldest mural paintings of Nonthaburi Province.
- Interactive map of Bang Krang Subdistrict
- Coordinates: 13°50′32″N 100°27′14″E
- Country: Thailand
- Province: Nonthaburi
- District: Mueang Nonthaburi

Population (2020)
  - Total: 31,954
- Time zone: UTC+7 (ICT)
- Postal code: 11000
- TIS 1099: 120108

Bang Krang (Thai: บางกร่าง, pronounced [bāːŋ kràːŋ]) is one of the ten subdistricts (tambon) of Mueang Nonthaburi District, in Nonthaburi Province, Thailand. Neighbouring subdistricts are (from north clockwise) Bang Rak Noi, Sai Ma, Bang Si Mueang, Bang Si Thong, Bang Khanun, Bang Khun Kong, Bang Khu Wiang and Bang Len. In 2020, it had a total population of 31,954 people.

== Administration ==
=== Central administration ===
The subdistrict is subdivided into 10 administrative villages (muban).

No.	Name	Thai
1.	Ban Bang Krang	บ้านบางกร่าง
2.	Ban Bang Krang	บ้านบางกร่าง
3.	Ban Bang Krang	บ้านบางกร่าง
4.	Ban Bang Krang	บ้านบางกร่าง
5.	Ban Bang Nang Kroek	บ้านบางนางเกริก
6.	Ban Bang Nang Kroek	บ้านบางนางเกริก
7.	Ban Bang Krang	บ้านบางกร่าง
8.	Ban Wat Khwan Mueang	บ้านวัดขวัญเมือง
9.	Ban Bang Rahong	บ้านบางระโหง
10.	Ban Wat Pracha Rangsan	บ้านวัดประชารังสรรค์

=== Local administration ===
The area of the subdistrict is shared by two local administrative organizations.

- Bang Krang Town Municipality (เทศบาลเมืองบางกร่าง)
- Bang Si Mueang Town Municipality (เทศบาลเมืองบางศรีเมือง)
