= Bang Si Mueang =

Bang Si Mueang Subdistrict ตำบลบางศรีเมือง
- Subdistrict
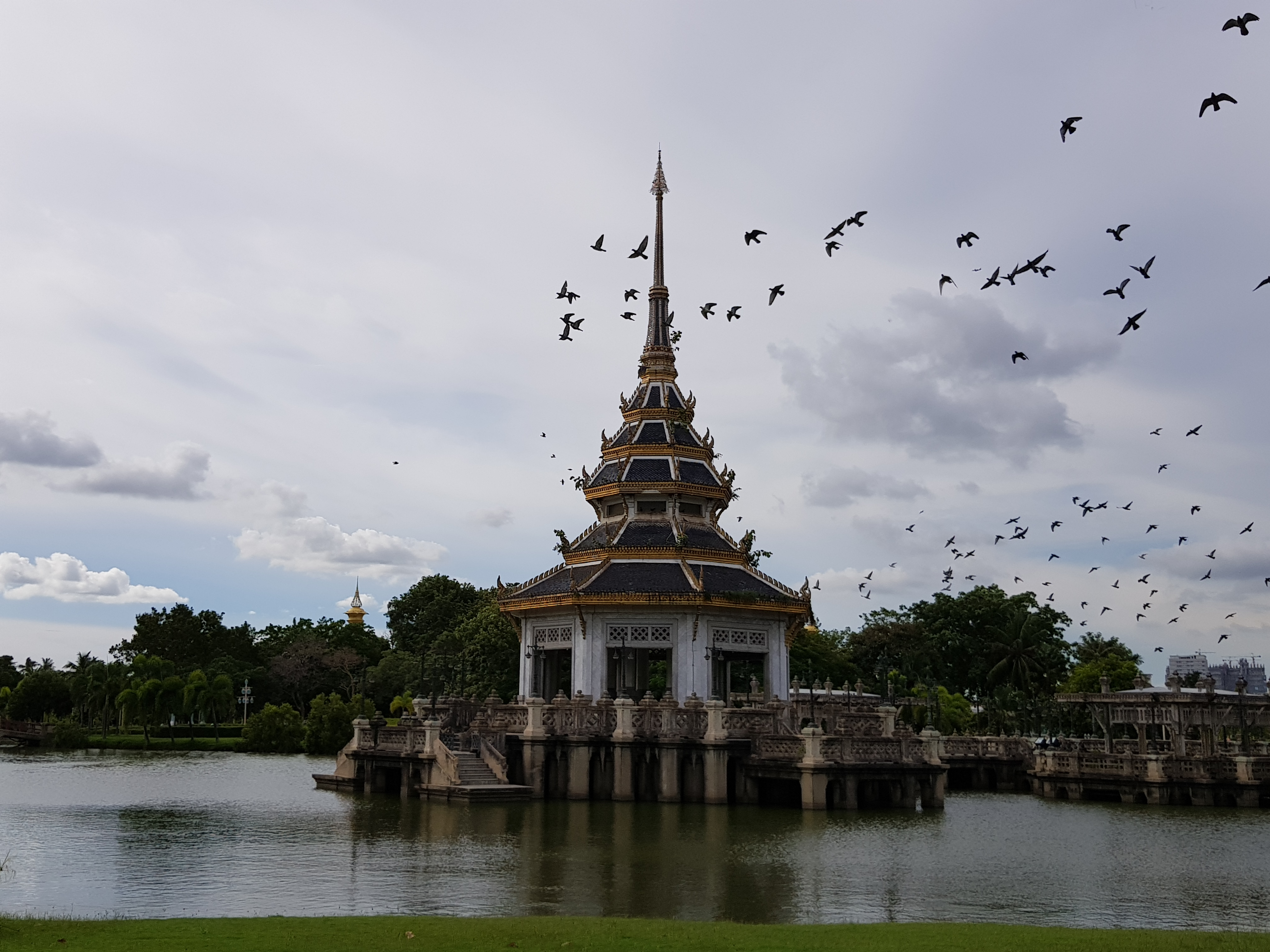
- Chaloem Golden Jubilee Park inside Wat Chaloem Phra Kiat Worawihan
- Country: Thailand
- Province: Nonthaburi
- District: Mueang Nonthaburi

Population (2020)
  - Total: 24,718
- Time zone: UTC+7 (ICT)
- Postal code: 11000
- TIS 1099: 120107

Bang Si Mueang (Thai: บางศรีเมือง, pronounced [bāːŋ sǐː mɯ̄a̯ŋ]) is one of the ten subdistricts (tambon) of Mueang Nonthaburi District, in Nonthaburi Province, Thailand. Neighbouring subdistricts are (from north clockwise) Sai Ma, Suan Yai (across the Chao Phraya River), Bang Phai, Bang Si Thong and Bang Krang. In 2020, it had a total population of 24,718 people.

== Administration ==
=== Central administration ===
The subdistrict is subdivided into 5 villages (muban).

No.	Name	Thai
1.	Ban Bang Si Mueang	บ้านบางศรีเมือง
2.	Ban Khlong Om	บ้านคลองอ้อม
3.	Ban Tha Nam Non	บ้านท่าน้ำนนท์
4.	Ban Huai Chorakhe	บ้านห้วยจรเข้
5.	Ban Bang Si Thong	บ้านบางสีทอง

=== Local administration ===
The whole area of the subdistrict is covered by Bang Si Mueang Town Municipality (เทศบาลเมืองบางศรีเมือง).
