= Bang Mae Nang =

Bang Mae Nang Subdistrict ตำบลบางแม่นาง
- Subdistrict
- Interactive map of Bang Mae Nang Subdistrict
- Coordinates: 13°52′17″N 100°22′35″E
- Country: Thailand
- Province: Nonthaburi
- District: Bang Yai

Population (2020)
  - Total: 50,798
- Time zone: UTC+7 (ICT)
- Postal code: 11140
- TIS 1099: 120302

Bang Mae Nang (Thai: บางแม่นาง, pronounced [bāːŋ mɛ̂ː nāːŋ]) is one of the six subdistricts (tambon) of Bang Yai District, in Nonthaburi Province, Thailand. Neighbouring subdistricts are (from north clockwise) Bang Khu Rat, Bang Rak Phatthana, Sao Thong Hin, Bang Muang, Bang Yai, and Ban Mai. In 2020, it had a total population of 50,798 people.

== Administration ==
=== Central administration ===
The subdistrict is subdivided into 18 administrative villages (muban).

No.	Name	Thai
1.	Ban Bang Krabue	บ้านบางกระบือ
2.	Ban Bang Krayi (Ban Bang Khayi)	บ้านบางกระยี่ (บ้านบางขยี้)
3.	Ban Khlong Bang Thong (Ban Bang Thong)	บ้านคลองบางทอง (บ้านบางทอง)
4.	Ban Nong Kangkhen	บ้านหนองกางเขน
5.	Ban Wat Lang Bang (Ban Bang Len)	บ้านวัดหลังบาง (บ้านบางเลน)
6.	Ban Khlong Bang Sai (Ban Bang Sai)	บ้านคลองบางไทร (บ้านบางไทร)
7.	Ban Rong Mu	บ้านโรงหมู่
8.	Ban Talat Bang Khu Lat	บ้านตลาดบางคูลัด
9.	Ban Khlong Bang Khu Lat	บ้านคลองบางคูลัด
10.	Ban Don Lat Takhan	บ้านดอนลาดตะค้าน
11.	Ban Khlong Bang Sai (Ban Don Thingthon)	บ้านคลองบางไทร (บ้านดอนทิ้งถ่อน)
12.	Ban Bang Kho	บ้านบางโค
13.	Ban Bang Noi (Ban Bang Kho)	บ้านบางน้อย (บ้านบางโค)
14.	Ban Wat Bang Kho (Ban Bang Kho)	บ้านวัดบางโค (บ้านบางโค)
15.	Ban Plai Khlong Bang Krabue (Ban Bang Krabue)	บ้านปลายคลองบางกระบือ (บ้านบางกระบือ)
16.	Ban Plai Khlong Bang Krabue 1	บ้านปลายคลองบางกระบือ 1
17.	Ban Plai Khlong Bang Krabue 2	บ้านปลายคลองบางกระบือ 2
18.	Ban Plai Khlong Bang Krabue 3	บ้านปลายคลองบางกระบือ 3

=== Local administration ===
The area of the subdistrict is shared by two local administrative organizations.

- Bang Mae Nang Town Municipality (เทศบาลเมืองบางแม่นาง)
- Bang Yai Subdistrict Municipality (เทศบาลตำบลบางใหญ่)
