= Bang Kruai subdistrict =

Bang Kruai Subdistrict ตำบลบางกรวย
- Subdistrict
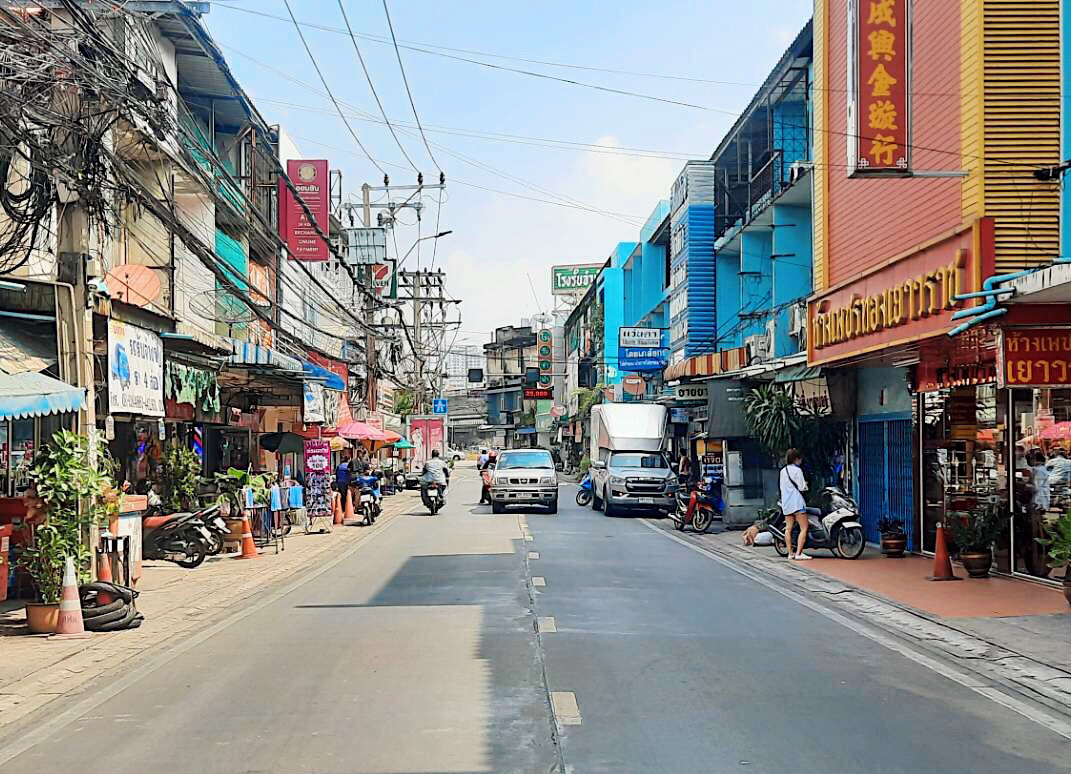
- Bang Kruai–Sai Noi Road in the subdistrict
- Country: Thailand
- Province: Nonthaburi
- District: Bang Kruai

Area
  - Total: 4.15 km^{2} (1.60 sq mi)

Population (2020)
  - Total: 27,836
  - Density: 6,707.47/km^{2} (17,372.3/sq mi)
- Time zone: UTC+7 (ICT)
- Postal code: 11130
- TIS 1099: 120202

Bang Kruai (Thai: บางกรวย, pronounced [bāːŋ krūa̯j]) is one of the nine subdistricts (tambon) of Bang Kruai District, in Nonthaburi Province, Thailand. The subdistrict is bounded by (clockwise from north) Bang Si Thong, Bang Phai, Suan Yai, Wong Sawang (across the Chao Phraya River), Bang O, Bang Phlat and Wat Chalo subdistricts. In 2020, it had a total population of 27,836 people.

== Administration ==
=== Central administration ===
The subdistrict is subdivided into 9 villages (muban).

No.	Name	Thai
1.	Ban Plai Khlong Bang Lamut	บ้านปลายคลองบางละมุด
2.	Ban Khlong Khue Khwang	บ้านคลองขื่อขวาง
3.	Ban Wat Lum	บ้านวัดลุ่ม
4.	Ban Wat Lum	บ้านวัดลุ่ม
5.	Ban Wat Lum	บ้านวัดลุ่ม
6.	Ban Wat Chan	บ้านวัดจันทร์
7.	Ban Wat Samrong	บ้านวัดสำโรง
8.	Ban Bang Kruai	บ้านบางกรวย
9.	Ban Bang Kruai	บ้านบางกรวย

=== Local administration ===
The whole area of the subdistrict is covered by Bang Kruai Town Municipality (เทศบาลเมืองบางกรวย).
