= Sai Ma MRT station =

Monorail station in Thailand

ไทรม้า PP07 Sai Ma
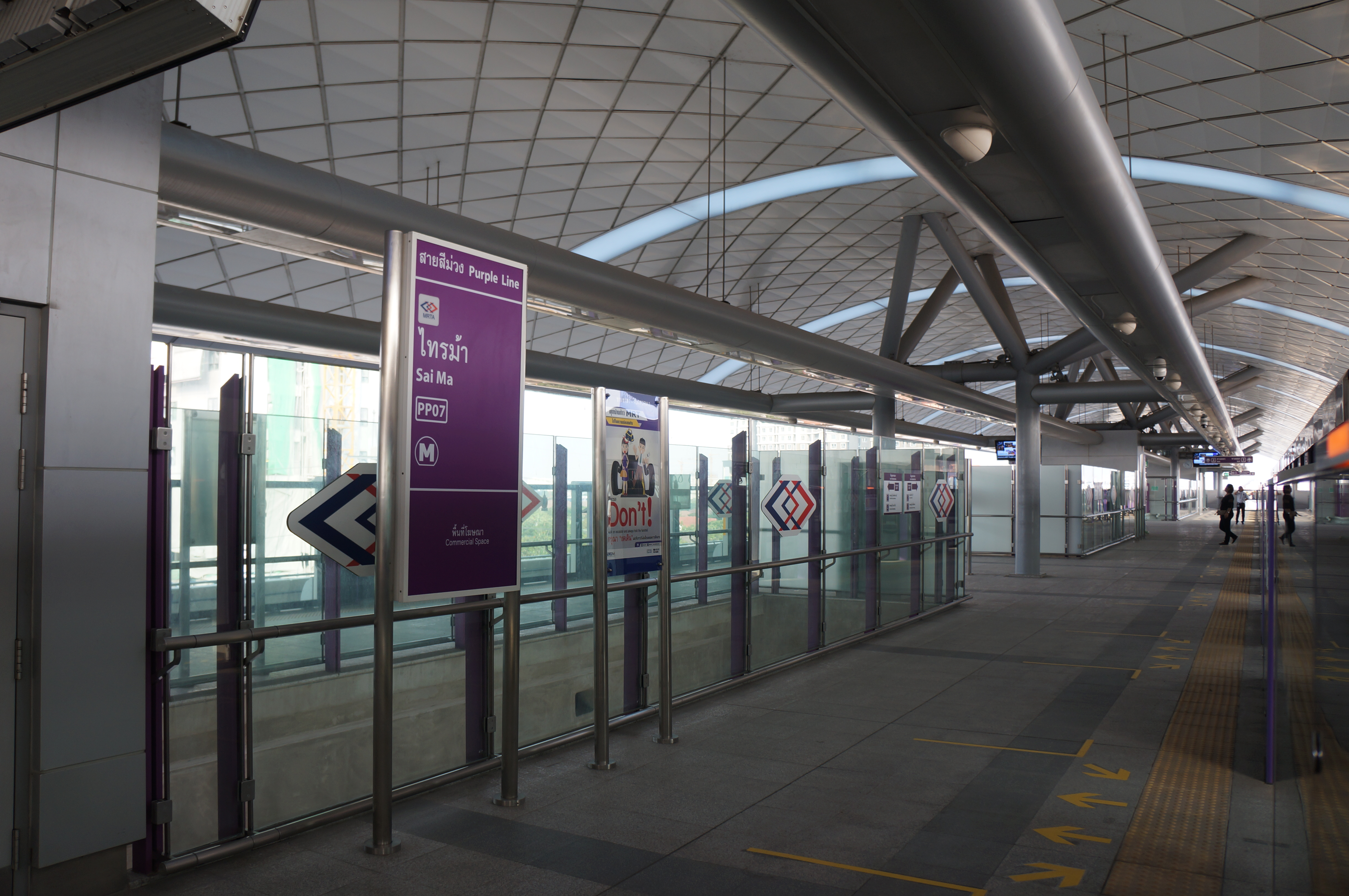
- Platform

General information
- Location: Sai Ma, Mueang Nonthaburi, Nonthaburi, Thailand
- Coordinates: 13°52′13.8″N 100°28′00.3″E
- System: | MRT
- Owner: Mass Rapid Transit Authority of Thailand
- Operator: Bangkok Expressway and Metro Public Company Limited
- Line: Purple Line
- Platforms: 2 (1 island platform)
- Tracks: 2
- Connections: Bus, Taxi

Construction
- Structure type: Elevated
- Parking: Not available
- Cycle facilities: Available
- Accessible: yes

Other information
- Station code: PP07

History
- Opened: 6 August 2016; 10 years ago

Passengers
- 2021: 435,570

Services
Preceding station	Metropolitan Rapid Transit	Following station
Bang Rak Noi Tha It towards Khlong Bang Phai	Purple Line	Phra Nang Klao Bridge towards Tao Poon
Location

Sai Ma station (Thai: สถานีไทรม้า, pronounced [sā.tʰǎː.nīː sāj máː]) is a Bangkok MRT station on the Purple Line. The station opened on 6 August 2016 and is located on Rattanathibet road in Nonthaburi Province. The station has four entrances.
