= Maha Sawat, Nonthaburi =

Maha Sawat Subdistrict ตำบลมหาสวัสดิ์
- Subdistrict
- Interactive map of Maha Sawat Subdistrict
- Country: Thailand
- Province: Nonthaburi
- District: Bang Kruai

Population (2020)
  - Total: 20,697
- Time zone: UTC+7 (ICT)
- Postal code: 11130
- TIS 1099: 120207

Maha Sawat (Thai: มหาสวัสดิ์, pronounced [mā.hǎː sā.wàt]) is one of the nine subdistricts (tambon) of Bang Kruai district, in Nonthaburi province, Thailand. Neighbouring subdistricts are (from north clockwise) Bang Khun Kong, Bang Khanun, Wat Chalo, Taling Chan, Chimphli, Plai Bang and Bang Khu Wiang. In 2020 it had a total population of 20,697 people.

== Administration ==
=== Central administration ===
The subdistrict is subdivided into 7 administrative villages (muban).

No.	Name	Thai
1.	Ban Wat Hu Chang (Ban Thanon Luang)	บ้านวัดหูช้าง (บ้านถนนหลวง)
2.	Ban Ton Pho (Ban Choeng Saphan Krung Non)	บ้านต้นโพธิ์ (บ้านเชิงสะพานกรุงนนท์)
3.	Ban Khlong Khwang	บ้านคลองขวาง
4.	Ban Rong Mu	บ้านโรงหมู
5.	Ban Saphan Phak	บ้านสะพานผัก
6.	Ban Khlong Khue Khwang (Ban Rim Khlong Khut)	บ้านคลองขื่อขวาง (บ้านริมคลองขุด)
7.	Ban Bang Rao Nok (Ban Wat Kho Non)	บ้านบางราวนก (บ้านวัดโคนอน)

=== Local administration ===
The area of the subdistrict is shared by two local administrative organizations.

- Plai Bang Subdistrict Municipality (เทศบาลตำบลปลายบาง)
- Maha Sawat Subdistrict Administrative Organization (องค์การบริหารส่วนตำบลมหาสวัสดิ์)
