= Wat Chalo subdistrict =

Wat Chalo Subdistrict ตำบลวัดชลอ
- Subdistrict
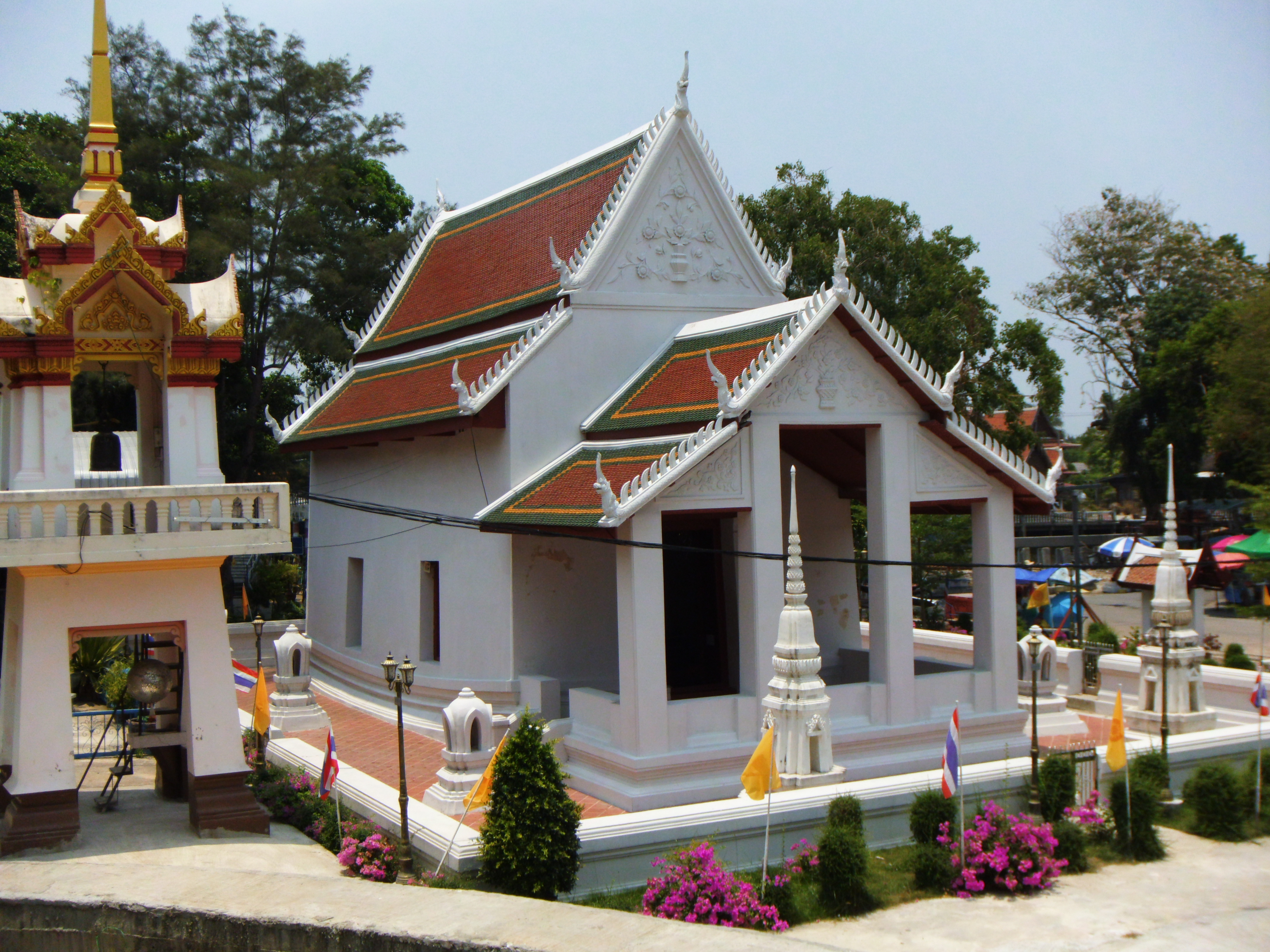
- Wat Chalo, the Buddhist temple after which the subdistrict is named
- Country: Thailand
- Province: Nonthaburi
- District: Bang Kruai

Area
  - Total: 4.17 km^{2} (1.61 sq mi)

Population (2020)
  - Total: 16,691
  - Density: 4,002.64/km^{2} (10,366.8/sq mi)
- Time zone: UTC+7 (ICT)
- Postal code: 11130
- TIS 1099: 120201

Wat Chalo (Thai: วัดชลอ, pronounced [wát t͡ɕʰā.lɔ̄ː]) is one of the nine subdistricts (tambon) of Bang Kruai District, in Nonthaburi Province, Thailand. The subdistrict is bounded by (clockwise from north) Bang Si Thong, Bang Kruai, Bang Phlat, Taling Chan, Maha Sawat and Bang Khanun subdistricts. In 2020 it had a total population of 16,691 people.

== Administration ==
=== Central administration ===
The subdistrict is subdivided into 10 villages (muban).

No.	Name	Thai
1.	Ban Wat Chalo	บ้านวัดชลอ
2.	Ban Wat Krachom	บ้านวัดกระโจม
3.	Ban Wat Chalo	บ้านวัดชลอ
4.	Ban Wat Sanam Nok	บ้านวัดสนามนอก
5.	Ban Pak Khlong Wat Sanam	บ้านปากคลองวัดสนาม
6.	Ban Wat Phikun Thong	บ้านวัดพิกุลทอง
7.	Ban Tai Wat Ket	บ้านใต้วัดเกด
8.	Ban Khao San	บ้านข้าวสาร
9.	Ban Bang O	บ้านบางโอ
10.	Ban Bang Si Thong	บ้านบางสีทอง

=== Local administration ===
The whole area of the subdistrict is covered by Bang Kruai Town Municipality (เทศบาลเมืองบางกรวย).
