= Bang Khu Wiang =

Bang Khu Wiang Subdistrict ตำบลบางคูเวียง
- Subdistrict
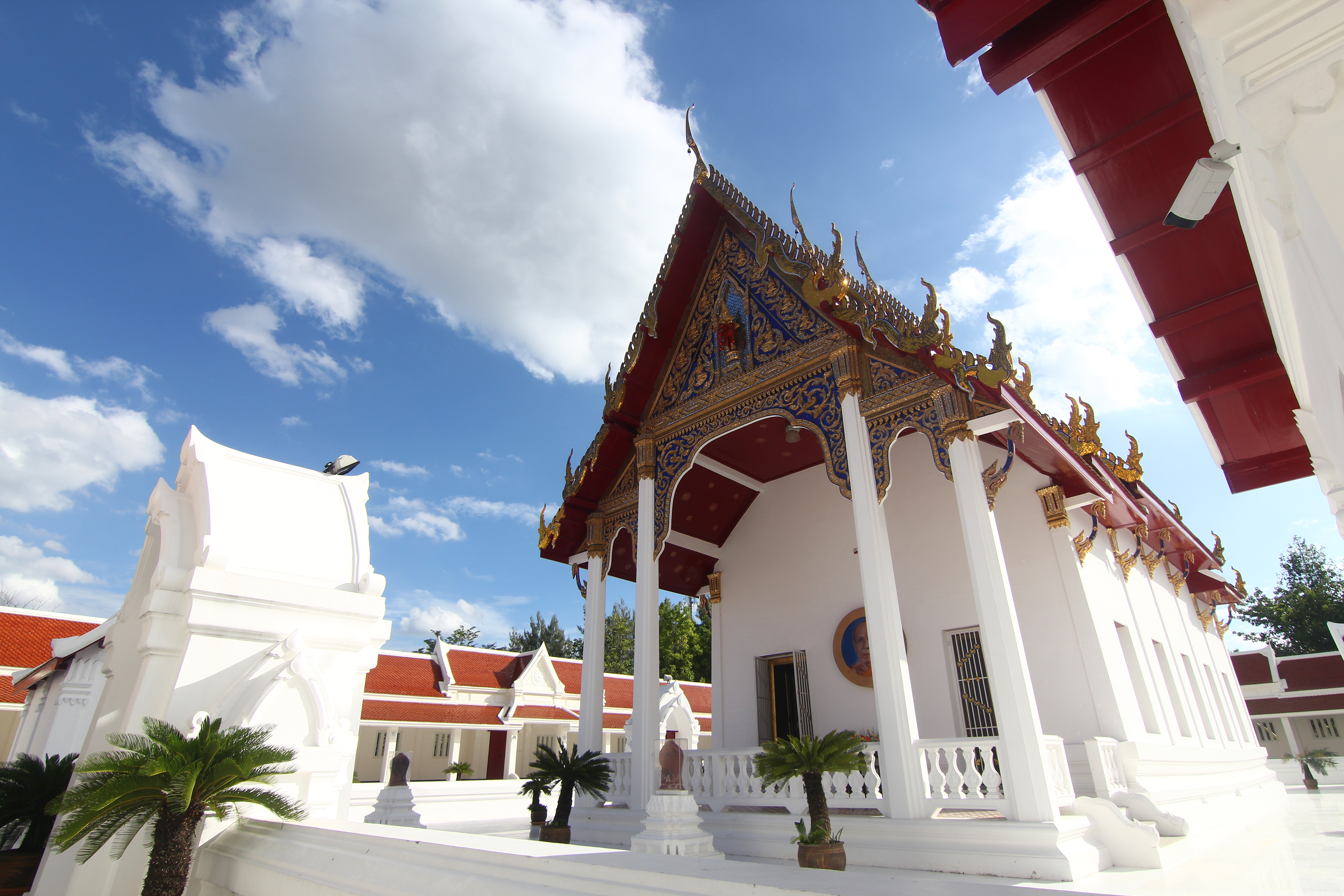
- Wat Bot Bon, a Buddhist temple in the subdistrict
- Country: Thailand
- Province: Nonthaburi
- District: Bang Kruai

Population (2020)
  - Total: 10,747
- Time zone: UTC+7 (ICT)
- Postal code: 11130
- TIS 1099: 120206

Bang Khu Wiang (Thai: บางคูเวียง, pronounced [bāːŋ kʰūː wīa̯ŋ]) is one of the nine subdistricts (tambon) of Bang Kruai District, in Nonthaburi Province, Thailand. The subdistrict is bounded by (clockwise from north) Bang Muang, Bang Len, Bang Krang, Bang Khun Kong, Maha Sawat and Plai Bang subdistricts. In 2020, it had a total population of 10,747 people.

== Administration ==
=== Central administration ===
The subdistrict is subdivided into 7 administrative villages (muban).

No.	Name	Thai
1.	Ban Bang Khu Wiang	บ้านบางคูเวียง
2.	Ban Khlong Khue Khwang	บ้านคลองขื่อขวาง
3.	Ban Bang Khu Wiang	บ้านบางคูเวียง
4.	Ban Bang Kho	บ้านบางค้อ
5.	Ban Bang Kho	บ้านบางค้อ
6.	Ban Khlong Bang Na	บ้านคลองบางนา
7.	Ban Khlong Bang Na	บ้านคลองบางนา

=== Local administration ===
The whole area of the subdistrict is covered by Plai Bang Subdistrict Municipality (เทศบาลตำบลปลายบาง).
