= Bang Khanun =

Bang Khanun Subdistrict ตำบลบางขนุน
- Subdistrict
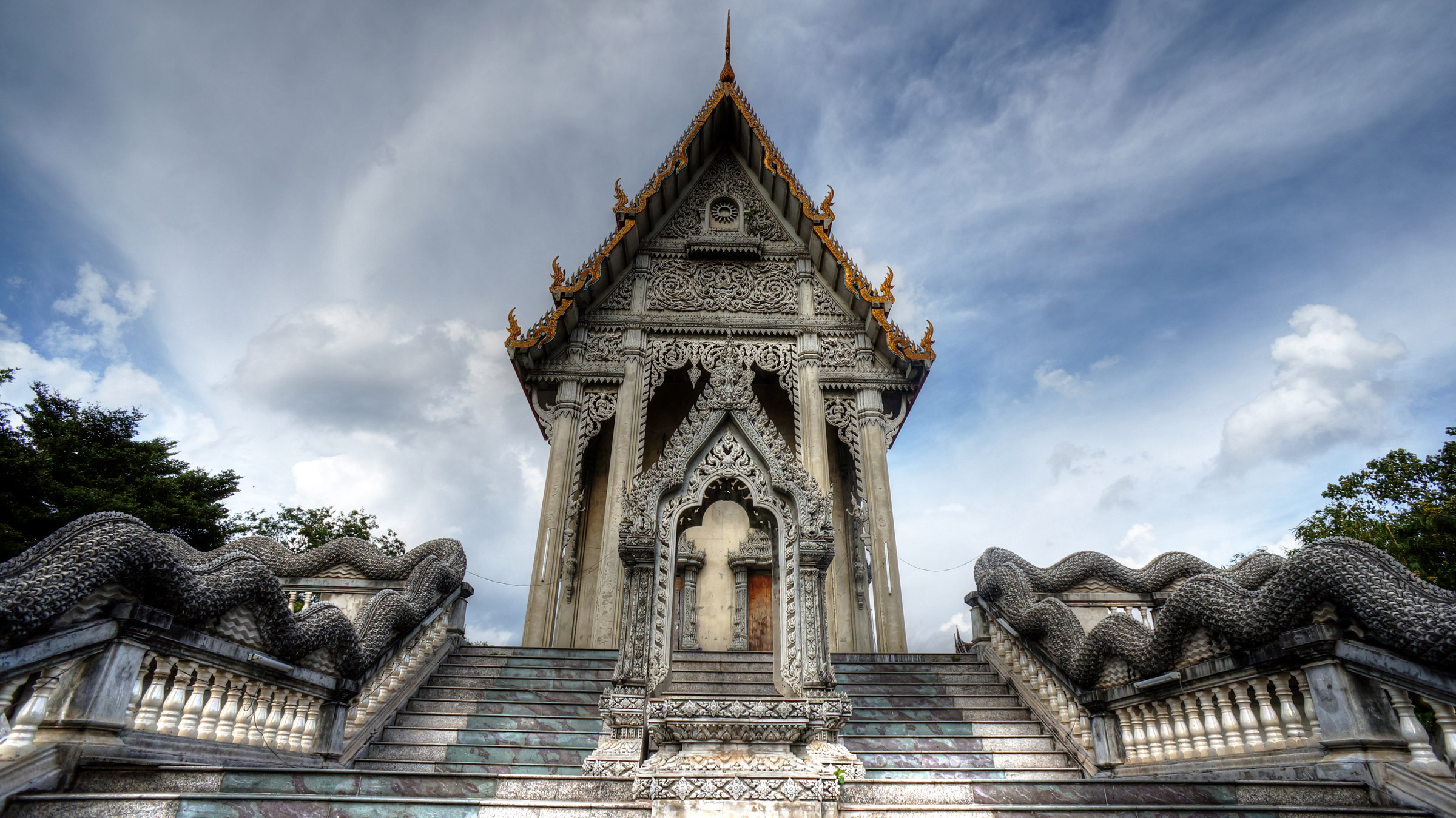
- Wat Kaeo Fa, a Buddhist temple in the subdistrict
- Interactive map of Bang Khanun Subdistrict
- Country: Thailand
- Province: Nonthaburi
- District: Bang Kruai

Area
  - Total: 3.56 km^{2} (1.37 sq mi)

Population (2020)
  - Total: 6,603
  - Density: 1,854.78/km^{2} (4,803.9/sq mi)
- Time zone: UTC+7 (ICT)
- Postal code: 11130
- TIS 1099: 120204

Bang Khanun (Thai: บางขนุน, pronounced [bāːŋ kʰā.nǔn]) is one of the nine subdistricts (tambon) of Bang Kruai District, in Nonthaburi Province, Thailand. Neighbouring subdistricts are (from north clockwise) Bang Krang, Bang Si Thong, Wat Chalo, Maha Sawat and Bang Khun Kong. In 2020, it had a total population of 6,603 people.

== Administration ==
=== Central administration ===
The subdistrict is subdivided into 5 administrative villages (muban).

No.	Name	Thai
1.	Ban Bang Khanun	บ้านบางขนุน
2.	Ban Tak Daet	บ้านตากแดด
3.	Ban Wat Sak	บ้านวัดสัก
4.	Ban Khlong Wat Sak	บ้านคลองวัดสัก
5.	Ban Phra That	บ้านพระธาตุ

=== Local administration ===
The whole area of the subdistrict is covered by Bang Khanun Subdistrict Administrative Organization (องค์การบริหารส่วนตำบลบางขนุน).
