= Bang Len subdistrict, Nonthaburi =

Bang Len Subdistrict ตำบลบางเลน
- Subdistrict
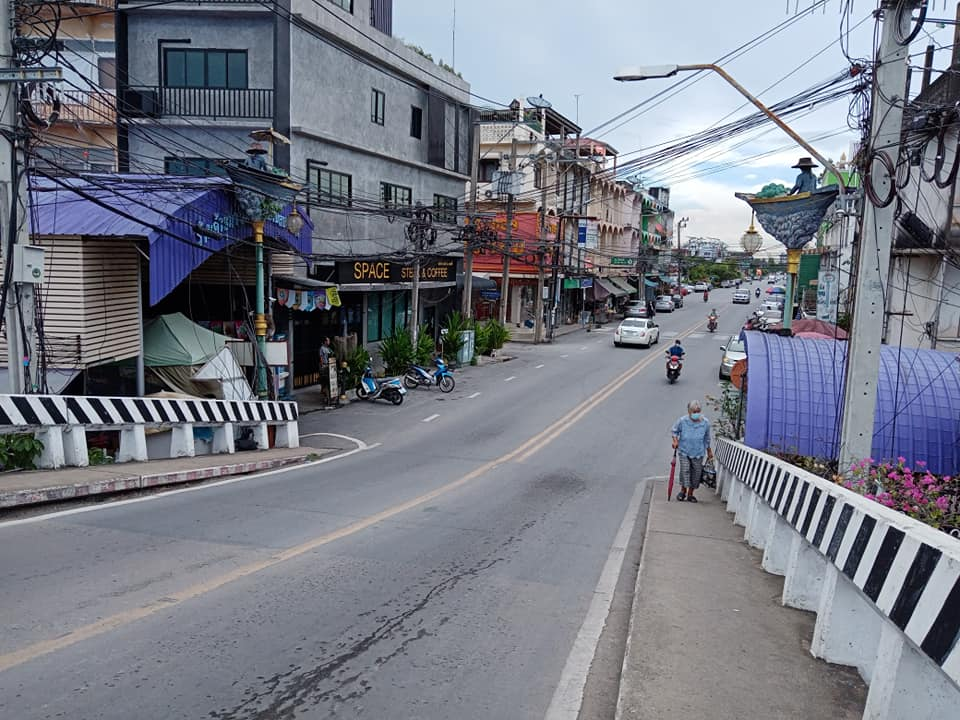
- The western branch of Bang Kruai–Sai Noi Road in the subdistrict
- Interactive map of Bang Len Subdistrict
- Country: Thailand
- Province: Nonthaburi
- District: Bang Yai

Population (2020)
  - Total: 19,566
- Time zone: UTC+7 (ICT)
- Postal code: 11140
- TIS 1099: 120303

Bang Len (Thai: บางเลน, pronounced [bāːŋ lēːn]) is one of the six subdistricts (tambon) of Bang Yai District, in Nonthaburi Province, Thailand. The subdistrict is bounded by (clockwise from north) Bang Rak Yai, Bang Rak Noi, Bang Krang, Bang Khu Wiang, Bang Muang and Sao Thong Hin subdistricts. In 2020, it had a total population of 19,566 people.

== Administration ==
=== Central administration ===
The subdistrict is subdivided into 11 administrative villages (muban).

No.	Name	Thai
1.	Ban Bang Len	บ้านบางเลน
2.	Ban Bang Phlu	บ้านบางพลู
3.	Ban Bang Masang	บ้านบางมะซาง
4.	Ban Bang Sakae	บ้านบางสะแก
5.	Ban Tha Rot	บ้านท่ารถ
6.	Ban Na Wat Prang Luang	บ้านหน้าวัดปรางค์หลวง
7.	Ban Wat Yukhantharawat	บ้านวัดยุคันธราวาส
8.	Ban Bang Si Rat	บ้านบางศรีราษฎร์
9.	Ban Bang Sakae	บ้านบางสะแก
10.	Ban Wat Noi	บ้านวัดน้อย
11.	Ban Na Rong Si	บ้านหน้าโรงสี

=== Local administration ===
The area of the subdistrict is shared by two local administrative organizations.

- Bang Len Subdistrict Municipality (เทศบาลตำบลบางเลน)
- Bang Muang Subdistrict Municipality (เทศบาลตำบลบางม่วง)
