= Bang Rak Yai =

Bang Rak Yai ตำบลบางรักใหญ่
- Subdistrict
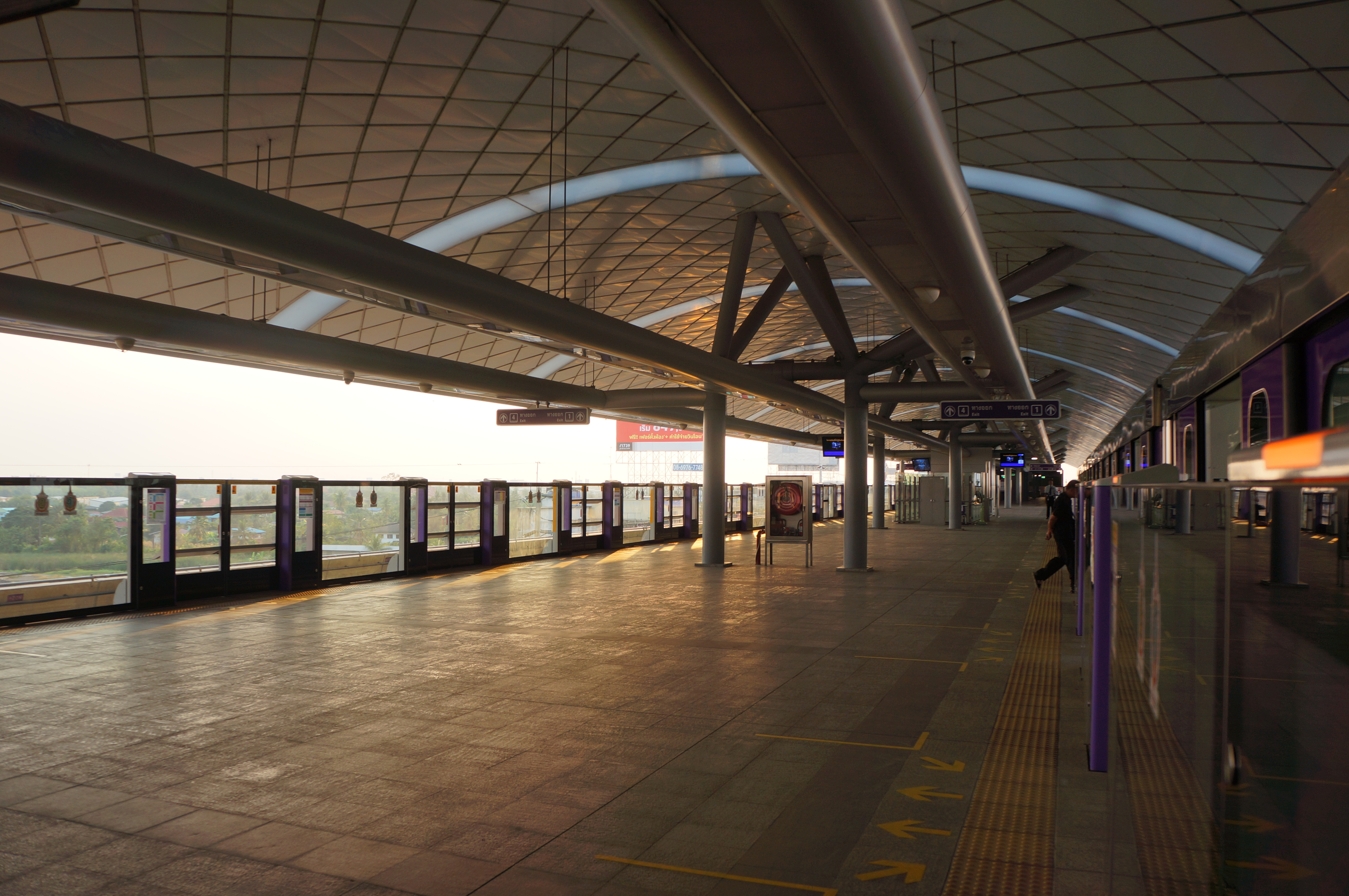
- Bang Phlu MRT station
- Interactive map of Bang Rak Yai
- Country: Thailand
- Province: Nonthaburi
- District: Bang Bua Thong

Population (2020)
  - Total: 9,547
- Time zone: UTC+7 (ICT)
- Postal code: 11110
- TIS 1099: 120403

Bang Rak Yai (Thai: บางรักใหญ่,pronounced [bāːŋ rák jàj]) is one of eight subdistricts (tambon) of Bang Bua Thong District, in Nonthaburi Province, Thailand. The subdistricts border (clockwise from the north) Bang Rak Phatthana, Bang Rak Noi, Bang Len and Sao Thong Hin. In 2020, the town has a total population of 9,547.

== Administration ==
=== Central government ===
The sub-region is divided into 11 administrative villages (muban).

| No. | Name | Thai |
|---|---|---|
| 1. | Ban Khlong Bang Phai (Ban Bang Phai) | บ้านคลองบางไผ่ (บ้านบางไผ่) |
| 2. | Ban Bang Rak Yai (Ban Nong Bua) | บ้านบางรักใหญ่ (บ้านหนองบัว) |
| 3. | Ban Khlong Bang Rak Yai (Ban Bang Rak Yai) | บ้านคลองบางรักใหญ่ (บ้านบางรักใหญ่) |
| 4. | Ban Bang Rak Yai | บ้านบางรักใหญ่ |
| 5. | Ban Khlong Bang Makham (Ban Khlong Lat) | บ้านคลองบางมะขาม (บ้านคลองลัด) |
| 6. | Ban Khlong Bang Phlu (Ban Bang Phlu) | บ้านคลองบางพลู (บ้านบางพลู) |
| 7. | Ban Rim Khlong Maenam Om (Ban Khlong Om) | บ้านริมคลองแม่น้ำอ้อม (บ้านคลองอ้อม) |
| 8. | Ban Khlong Bang Phai | บ้านคลองบางไผ่ |
| 9. | Ban Khlong Bang Duea (Ban Bang Duea) | บ้านคลองบางเดื่อ (บ้านบางเดื่อ) |
| 10. | Ban Bang Duea | บ้านบางเดื่อ |
| 11. | Ban Bang Phraek Noi (Ban Khlong Bang Phai) | บ้านบางแพรกน้อย (บ้านคลองบางไผ่) |

=== Local administration ===
The area of the sub-district is shared by two local administrative organizations.

- Bang Bua Thong Town Municipality (เทศบาลเมืองบางบัวทอง)
- Bang Rak Yai Subdistrict Administrative Organization (องค์การบริหารส่วนตำบลบางรักใหญ่)
