= Bang Khu Rat =

Bang Khu Rat Subdistrict ตำบลบางคูรัด
- Subdistrict
- Interactive map of Bang Khu Rat Subdistrict
- Country: Thailand
- Province: Nonthaburi
- District: Bang Bua Thong

Area
  - Total: 19.7 km^{2} (7.6 sq mi)

Population (2020)
  - Total: 40,360
  - Density: 2,048.73/km^{2} (5,306.2/sq mi)
- Time zone: UTC+7 (ICT)
- Postal code: 11110
- TIS 1099: 120404

Bang Khu Rat (Thai: บางคูรัด, pronounced [bāːŋ kʰūː rát]) is one of the eight subdistricts (tambon) of Bang Bua Thong District, in Nonthaburi Province, Thailand. The subdistrict is bounded by (clockwise from north) Phimon Rat, Bang Rak Phatthana, Bang Mae Nang, Ban Mai, Nong Phrao Ngai and Thawi Watthana subdistricts. In 2020, it had a total population of 40,360 people.

== Administration ==
=== Central administration ===
The subdistrict is subdivided into 10 administrative villages (muban).

No.	Name	Thai
1.	Ban Plai Khlong Bang Khu Rat	บ้านปลายคลองบางคูรัด
2.	Ban Nong Nok Faek (Ban Nok Faek)	บ้านหนองนกแฝก (บ้านนกแฝก)
3.	Ban Nong Sano	บ้านหนองโสน
4.	Ban Nong Kradi	บ้านหนองกระดี่
5.	Ban Nong Ai Prong	บ้านหนองอ้ายปรง
6.	Ban Lat Krachet (Ban Bang Khu Rat)	บ้านลาดกระเฉด (บ้านบางคูรัด)
7.	Ban Rang Lako	บ้านรางละกอ
8.	Ban Nong Phak Top (Ban Tem Rak)	บ้านหนองผักตบ (บ้านเต็มรัก)
9.	Ban Khlong Ta Chom	บ้านคลองตาชม
10.	Ban Plai Khlong Nai Lik (Ban Khlong Nai Lik)	บ้านปลายคลองนายหลีก (บ้านคลองนายหลีก)

=== Local administration ===
The whole area of the subdistrict is covered by Bang Khu Rat Town Municipality (เทศบาลเมืองบางคูรัด).
