= Bang Si Thong =

Bang Si Thong Subdistrict ตำบลบางสีทอง
- Subdistrict
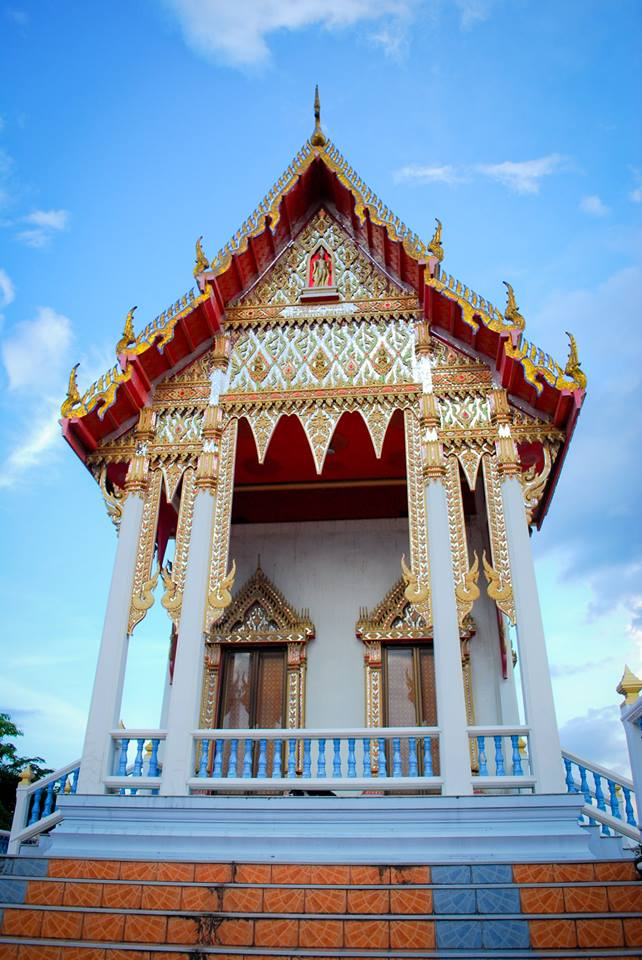
- Wat Sai, a Buddhist temple in the subdistrict
- Interactive map of Bang Si Thong Subdistrict
- Coordinates: 13°49′09″N 100°28′44″E
- Country: Thailand
- Province: Nonthaburi
- District: Bang Kruai

Area
  - Total: 5.8 km^{2} (2.2 sq mi)

Population (2020)
  - Total: 11,426
  - Density: 1,970/km^{2} (5,100/sq mi)
- Time zone: UTC+7 (ICT)
- Postal code: 11130
- TIS 1099: 120203

Bang Si Thong (Thai: บางสีทอง, pronounced [bāːŋ sǐː tʰɔ̄ːŋ]) is one of the nine subdistricts (tambon) of Bang Kruai District, in Nonthaburi Province, Thailand. The subdistrict is bounded by (clockwise from north) Bang Krang, Bang Si Mueang, Bang Phai, Bang Kruai, Wat Chalo and Bang Khanun subdistricts. In 2020, it had a total population of 11,426 people.

== Administration ==
=== Central administration ===
The subdistrict is subdivided into 5 administrative villages (muban).

No.	Name	Thai
1.	Ban Wat Sai	บ้านวัดไทร
2.	Ban Wat Bang Oi Chang	บ้านวัดบางอ้อยช้าง
3.	Ban Wat Daeng Pracha Rat	บ้านวัดแดงประชาราษฎร์
4.	Ban Wat Ruak Bang Si Thong	บ้านวัดรวกบางสีทอง
5.	Ban Bang Si Thong	บ้านบางสีทอง

=== Local administration ===
The whole area of the subdistrict is covered by Bang Si Thong Subdistrict Municipality (เทศบาลตำบลบางสีทอง).
