= Wat Prang Luang =

14th century Buddhist temple

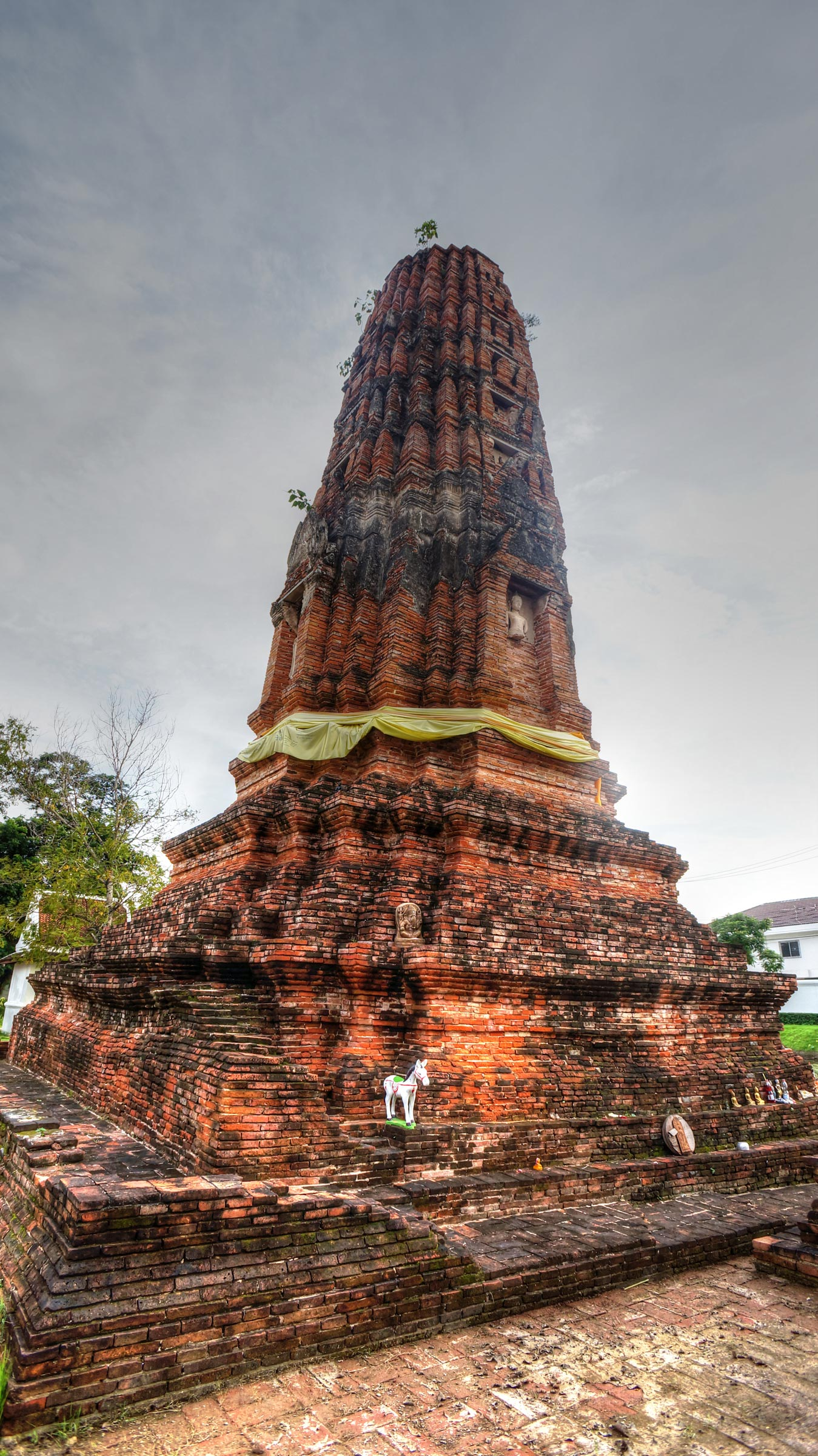
- The prang

- Location within Thailand

Religion
- Affiliation: Buddhism
- Sect: Mahā Nikāya
- Region: central Thailand
- Status: private temple

Location
- Location: 31 Moo 1 Wat Prang Luang Rd, Bang Muang, Bang Yai, Nonthaburi
- Country: Thailand
- Interactive map of Wat Prang Luang
- Coordinates: 13.839972°N 100.422667°E

Architecture
- Founder: Ramathibodi I (U-Thong)
- Completed: 1347 or 1361

Wat Prang Luang (Thai: วัดปรางค์หลวง, pronounced [wát prāːŋ lǔaŋ]) is a 14th-century Thai Buddhist temple in Nonthaburi province, and considered the oldest monastery and archaeological site in Nonthaburi and the Bangkok Metropolitan Region. It is situated along Khlong Om Non, also known as Khlong Bangkok Noi.

The temple previously called "Wat Luang" (วัดหลวง, "royal temple") was presumably built in the reign of King Ramathibodi I (U-Thong), the first monarch and founder of Ayutthaya Kingdom more than 650 years ago. Believing that its location was his residence after the cholera evacuation before the establishment of Ayutthaya Kingdom.

Later in the Rattanakosin period, Vajirananavarorasa, the 10th Supreme Patriarch of Thailand, found that prang (chedi in Khmer-style) was built at the same time as the temple. Then he changed the temple's name to "Wat Prang Luang," which has an ancient prang as a landmark and symbol.

The prang is old and dilapidated; it has been archaeologically proven to date back to the early Ayutthaya period with a different structure than the other prangs of the same period. A principal Buddha image in Māravijaya attitude has 9 meters (29 ft) width lap named "Luang Pho U-Thong" is enshrined in the ordination hall. It is considered a sacred Buddha image and is highly revered by Buddhists, both local and outsiders. Every Monday evening, the abbot holds a prayer activity every week.
