= Bang Rak Noi =

Bang Rak Noi Subdistrict ตำบลบางรักน้อย
- Subdistrict
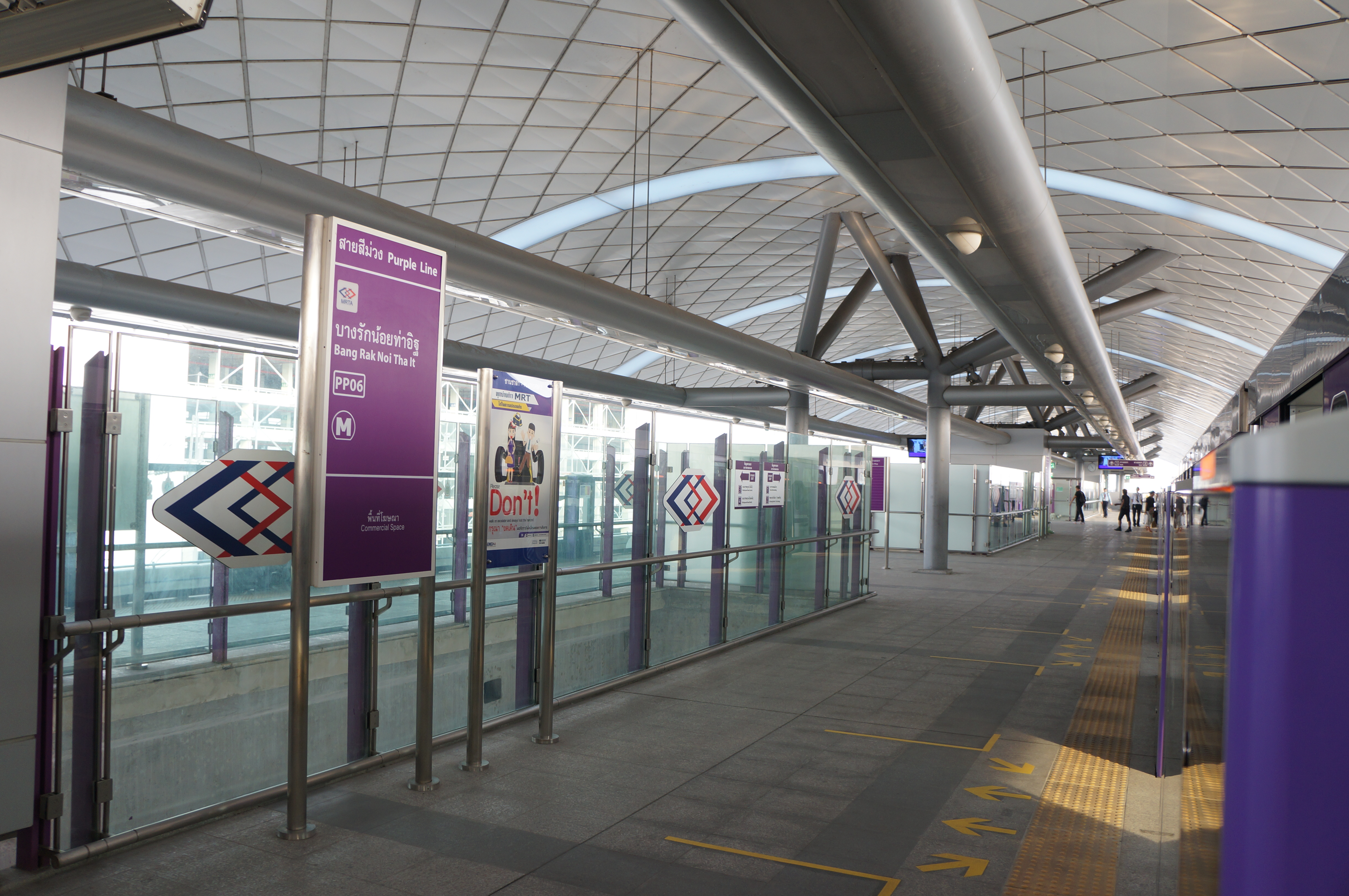
- Bang Rak Noi Tha It MRT station
- Interactive map of Bang Rak Noi Subdistrict
- Country: Thailand
- Province: Nonthaburi
- District: Mueang Nonthaburi

Area
  - Total: 5.8 km^{2} (2.2 sq mi)

Population (2020)
  - Total: 21,366
  - Density: 3,683.79/km^{2} (9,541.0/sq mi)
- Time zone: UTC+7 (ICT)
- Postal code: 11000
- TIS 1099: 120110

Bang Rak Noi (Thai: บางรักน้อย, pronounced [bāːŋ rák nɔ́ːj]) is one of the ten subdistricts (tambon) of Mueang Nonthaburi District, in Nonthaburi Province, Thailand. Neighbouring subdistricts are (from north clockwise) Om Kret, Tha It, Sai Ma, Bang Krang, Bang Len, Bang Rak Yai and Bang Rak Phatthana. In 2020, it had a total population of 21,366 people.

== Administration ==
=== Central administration ===
The subdistrict is subdivided into 6 administrative villages (muban).

No.	Name	Thai
1.	Ban Bang Pradu	บ้านบางประดู่
2.	Ban Bang Rak Noi	บ้านบางรักน้อย
3.	Ban Bang Rak Noi	บ้านบางรักน้อย
4.	Ban Bang Rak Noi	บ้านบางรักน้อย
5.	Ban Nong Bua	บ้านหนองบัว
6.	Ban Bang Pradu Yai	บ้านบางประดู่ใหญ่

=== Local administration ===
The whole area of the subdistrict is covered by Bang Rak Noi Subdistrict Administrative Organization (องค์การบริหารส่วนตำบลบางรักน้อย).
