= Sao Thong Hin =

Sao Thong Hin Subdistrict ตำบลเสาธงหิน
- Subdistrict
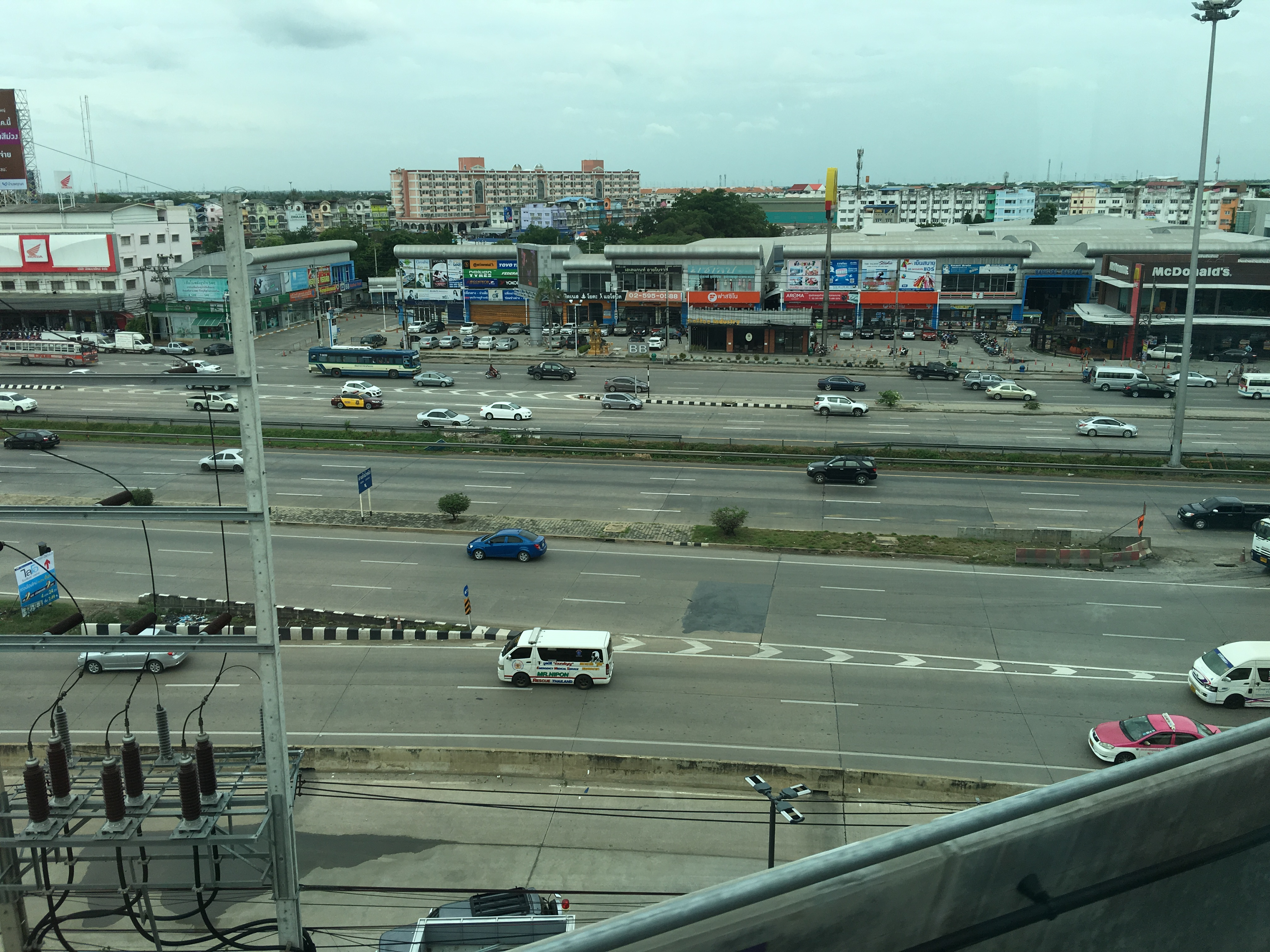
- Kanchanaphisek Road in the subdistrict
- Interactive map of Sao Thong Hin Subdistrict
- Country: Thailand
- Province: Nonthaburi
- District: Bang Yai

Population (2020)
  - Total: 40,566
- Time zone: UTC+7 (ICT)
- Postal code: 11140
- TIS 1099: 120304

Sao Thong Hin (Thai: เสาธงหิน, pronounced [sǎw tʰōŋ hǐn]) is one of the six subdistricts (tambon) of Bang Yai District, in Nonthaburi Province, Thailand. Neighbouring subdistricts are (from north clockwise) Bang Rak Phatthana, Bang Rak Yai, Bang Len, Bang Muang and Bang Mae Nang. In 2020 it had a total population of 40,566 people.

== Administration ==
=== Central administration ===
The subdistrict is subdivided into 8 administrative villages (muban).

| No. | Name | Thai |
|---|---|---|
| 1. | Ban Khlong Om | บ้านคลองอ้อม |
| 2. | Ban Khlong Bang Yai | บ้านคลองบางใหญ่ |
| 3. | Ban Khlong Sao Thong Hin | บ้านคลองเสาธงหิน |
| 4. | Ban Khlong Bang Krabue (Ban Bang Krabue) | บ้านคลองบางกระบือ (บ้านบางกระบือ) |
| 5. | Ban Khlong Khue Lat (Ban Bang Khue Lat) | บ้านคลองขื่อลัด (บ้านบางขื่อลัด) |
| 6. | Ban Khlong Phutsa (Ban Bang Phutsa) | บ้านคลองพุทรา (บ้านบางพุดซา) |
| 7. | Ban Khlong Bang Duea (Ban Bang Duea) | บ้านคลองบางเดื่อ (บ้านบางเดื่อ) |
| 8. | Ban Lat Takhe | บ้านลาดตะเข้ |

=== Local administration ===
The area of the subdistrict is shared by two local administrative organizations.

- Sao Thong Hin Subdistrict Municipality (เทศบาลตำบลเสาธงหิน)
- Bang Muang Subdistrict Municipality (เทศบาลตำบลบางม่วง)
