= Bang Yai subdistrict, Nonthaburi =

Bang Yai Subdistrict ตำบลบางใหญ่
- Subdistrict
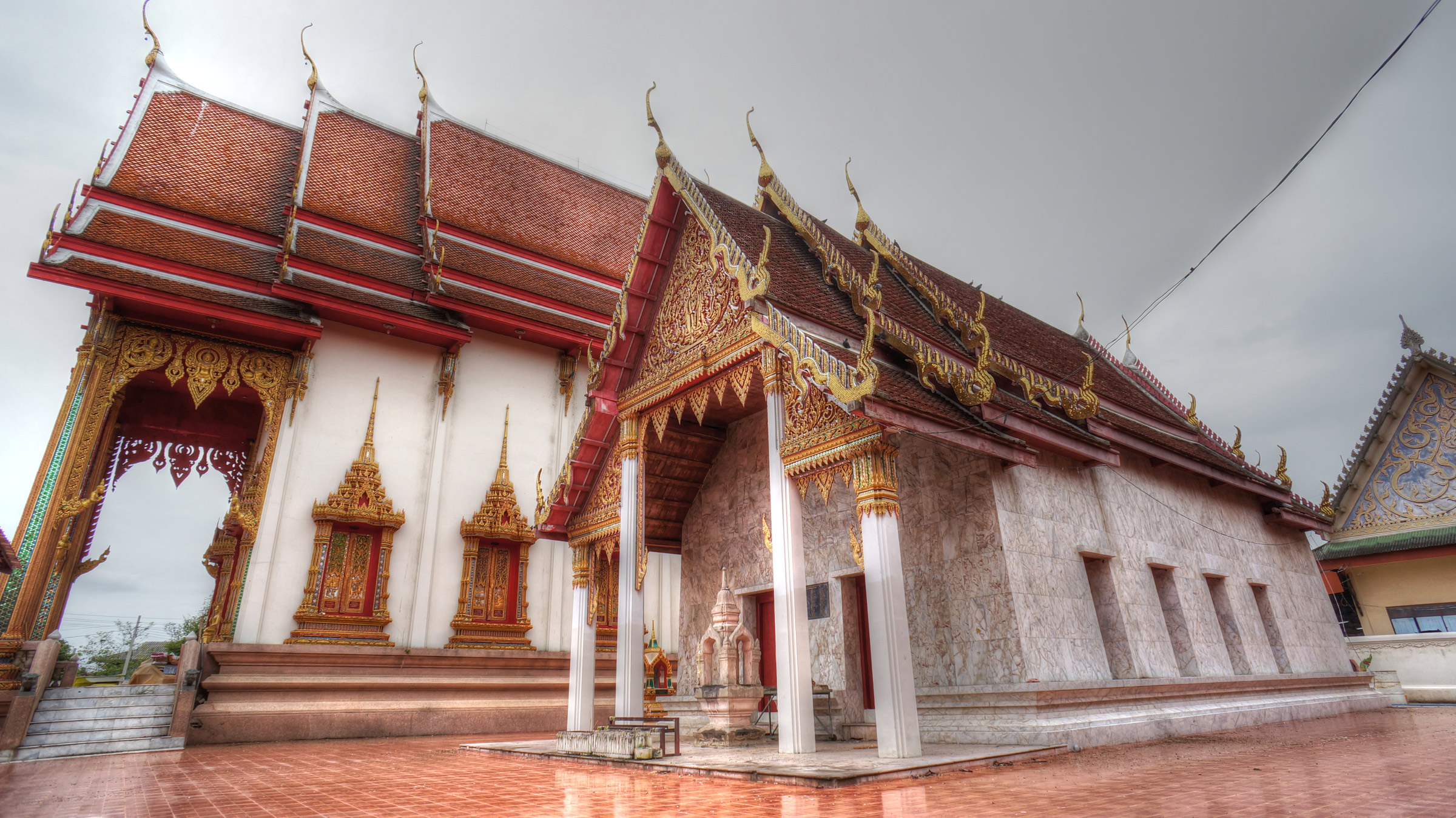
- Wat Anek Dittharam, one of the two Buddhist temples in the subdistrict
- Interactive map of Bang Yai Subdistrict
- Country: Thailand
- Province: Nonthaburi
- District: Bang Yai

Population (2020)
  - Total: 20,616
- Time zone: UTC+7 (ICT)
- Postal code: 11140
- TIS 1099: 120305

Bang Yai (Thai: บางใหญ่, pronounced [bāːŋ jàj]) is one of the six subdistricts (tambon) of Bang Yai District, in Nonthaburi Province, Thailand. The subdistrict is bounded by (clockwise from north) Ban Mai, Bang Mae Nang, Bang Muang, Sala Klang and Sala Ya subdistricts. In 2020, it had a total population of 20,616 people.

== Administration ==
=== Central administration ===
The subdistrict is subdivided into 6 administrative villages (muban).

No.	Name	Thai
1.	Ban Bang Sano	บ้านบางโสน
2.	Ban Khlong Bang Yai	บ้านคลองบางใหญ่
3.	Ban Chao (Ban Bang Yai)	บ้านเจ้า (บ้านบางใหญ่)
4.	Ban Talat Bang Khu Lat	บ้านตลาดบางคูลัด
5.	Ban Bang Yai	บ้านบางใหญ่
6.	Ban Si Yaek Khlong Yong	บ้านสี่แยกคลองโยง

=== Local administration ===
The area of the subdistrict is shared by two local administrative organizations.

- Bang Yai Subdistrict Municipality (เทศบาลตำบลบางใหญ่)
- Bang Yai Subdistrict Administrative Organization (องค์การบริหารส่วนตำบลบางใหญ่)
