= Sala Klang =

Sala Klang Subdistrict ตำบลศาลากลาง
- Subdistrict
- Location within Bangkok Location within Thailand
- Coordinates: 13°48′35″N 100°21′32″E
- Country: Thailand
- Province: Nonthaburi
- District: Bang Kruai

Area
  - Total: 14.78 km^{2} (5.71 sq mi)

Population (2020)
  - Total: 20,057
  - Density: 1,357.04/km^{2} (3,514.7/sq mi)
- Time zone: UTC+7 (ICT)
- Postal code: 11130
- TIS 1099: 120209

Sala Klang (Thai: ศาลากลาง, pronounced [sǎː.lāː klāːŋ]) is one of the nine subdistricts (tambon) of Bang Kruai District, in Nonthaburi Province, Thailand. The subdistrict is bounded by (clockwise from north) Bang Yai, Bang Muang, Plai Bang, Sala Thammasop and Sala Ya subdistricts. In 2020 it had a total population of 20,057 people.

== Administration ==
=== Central administration ===
The subdistrict is subdivided into 6 administrative villages (muban).

No.	Name	Thai
1.	Ban Khlong Bang Na (Ban Khlong Plai Bang)	บ้านคลองบางนา (บ้านคลองปลายบาง)
2.	Ban Pratunam Chimphli	บ้านประตูน้ำฉิมพลี
3.	Ban Sala Klang (Ban Khlong Bang Na)	บ้านศาลากลาง (บ้านคลองบางนา)
4.	Ban Khlong Khut Maha Sawat (Ban Khlong Maha Sawat)	บ้านคลองขุดมหาสวัสดิ์ (บ้านคลองมหาสวัสดิ์)
5.	Ban Charoen Suk (Ban Sala Klang)	บ้านเจริญสุข (บ้านศาลากลาง)
6.	Ban Naraphirom (Ban Khlong Naraphirom)	บ้านนราภิรมย์ (บ้านคลองนราภิรมย์)

=== Local administration ===
The whole area of the subdistrict is covered by Sala Klang Subdistrict Municipality (เทศบาลตำบลศาลากลาง).
