= Bang Phai, Nonthaburi =

Bang Phai Subdistrict ตำบลบางไผ่
- Subdistrict
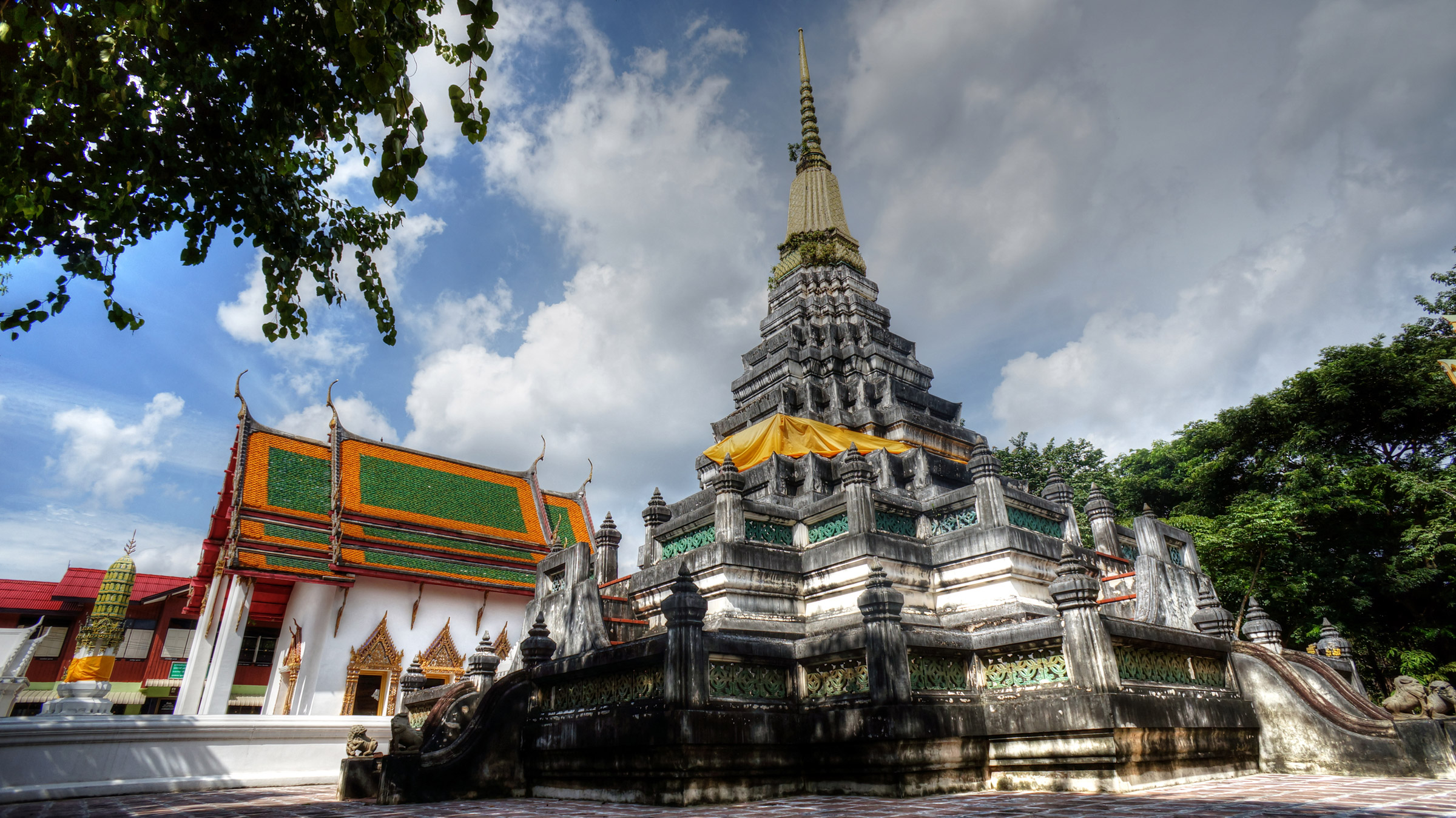
- Wat Chotikaram, one of the eight Buddhist temples in the subdistrict
- Interactive map of Bang Phai Subdistrict
- Coordinates: 13°49′29″N 100°29′27″E
- Country: Thailand
- Province: Nonthaburi
- District: Mueang Nonthaburi

Area
  - Total: 5.61 km^{2} (2.17 sq mi)

Population (2020)
  - Total: 12,482
  - Density: 2,224.96/km^{2} (5,762.6/sq mi)
- Time zone: UTC+7 (ICT)
- Postal code: 11000
- TIS 1099: 120106

Bang Phai (Thai: บางไผ่, pronounced [bāːŋ pʰàj]) is one of the ten subdistricts (tambon) of Mueang Nonthaburi District, in Nonthaburi Province, Thailand. Neighbouring subdistricts are (from north clockwise) Bang Si Mueang, Suan Yai (across the Chao Phraya River), Bang Kruai and Bang Si Thong. In 2020, it had a total population of 12,482 people.

== Administration ==
=== Central administration ===
The subdistrict is subdivided into 5 administrative villages (muban).

No.	Name	Thai
1.	Ban Bang Phai	บ้านบางไผ่
2.	Ban Bang Phai Yai	บ้านบางไผ่ใหญ่
3.	Ban Bang Phai Yai	บ้านบางไผ่ใหญ่
4.	Ban Bang Phai Noi	บ้านบางไผ่น้อย
5.	Ban Thong Na Prang	บ้านทองนาปรัง

=== Local administration ===
The whole area of the subdistrict is covered by Bang Phai Subdistrict Administrative Organization (องค์การบริหารส่วนตำบลบางไผ่).
