= Bang Yai district =

Bang Yai บางใหญ่
- District
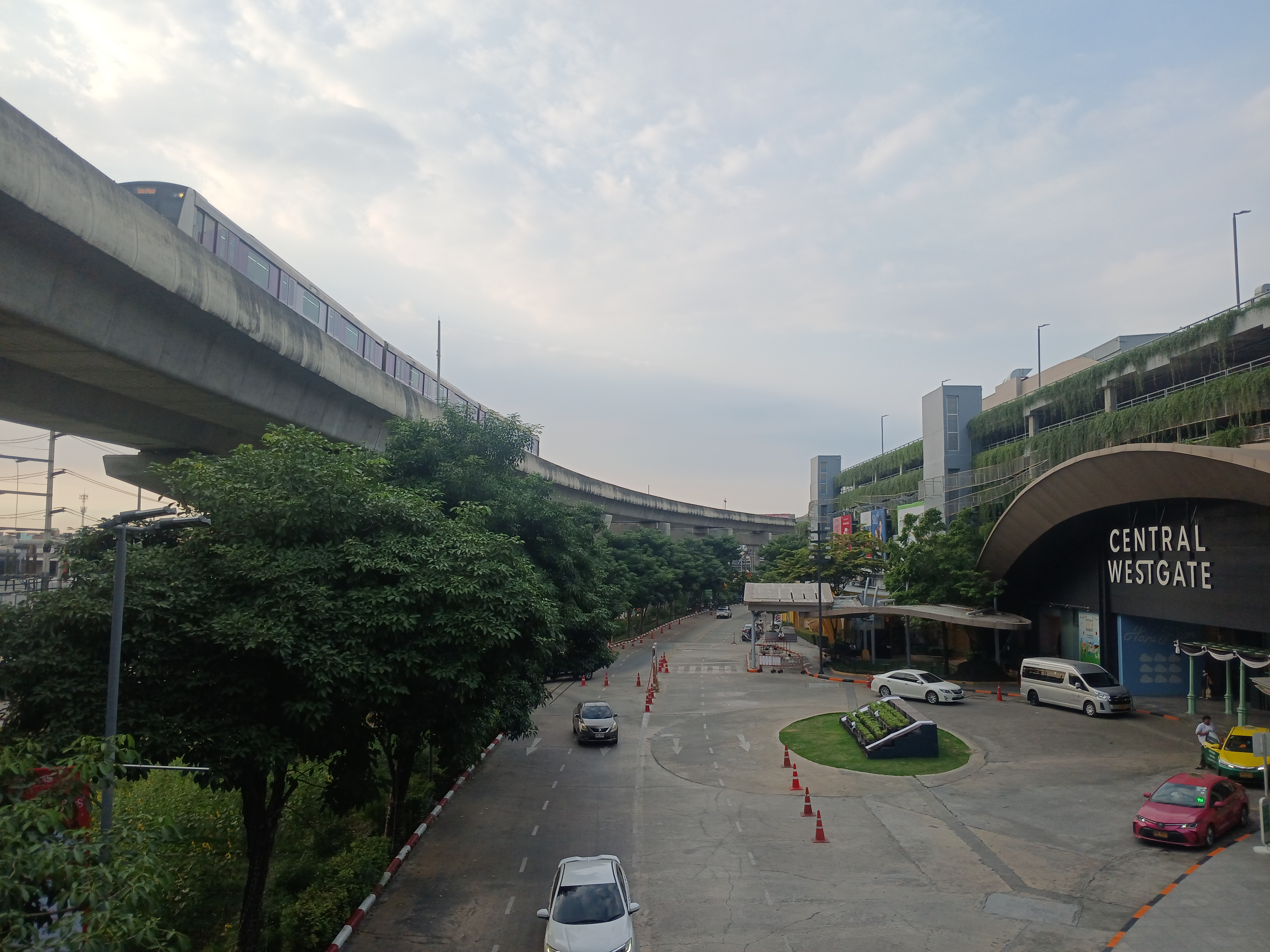
- Central WestGate shopping mall, seen from the footbridge connecting its main building to its Auto1 tire shop, a Purple Line train is visible in the background.
- Interactive map of Bang Yai
- Country: Thailand
- Province: Nonthaburi
- Seat: Sao Thong Hin
- Tambon: 6
- Muban: 69
- District established: 1 April 1921

Area
  - Total: 57.4 km^{2} (22.2 sq mi)

Population (2025)
  - Total: 175,294
  - Density: 2,728/km^{2} (7,070/sq mi)
- Time zone: UTC+7
- Postal code: 11140
- Calling code: 02
- ISO 3166 code: TH-1203

Bang Yai (Thai: บางใหญ่, pronounced [bāːŋ jàj]) is a district (amphoe) in the western part of Nonthaburi province, central Thailand.

== History ==
The district was created in 1917 as a minor district (king amphoe) by splitting it from the districts Bang Kruai and Bang Bua Thong. In 1921 it was elevated to full district status. Originally named Bang Mae Nang, on 19 October 1930 it was renamed "Bang Yai", the original name of Bang Kruai District.

== Geography ==
Neighbouring districts are (from the north clockwise) Sai Noi, Bang Bua Thong, Mueang Nonthaburi, Bang Kruai, and Phutthamonthon of Nakhon Pathom province.

== Religion ==
Most people in Bang Yai district are Buddhist. There are total 26 Theravada Buddhist temples in the district, of which 23 Maha Nikai and 3 Dhammayut temples.
Further there are two Christian churches in the district.

== Administrative divisions ==
District location in Nonthaburi province

Map of district with seven municipalities

=== Provincial government ===
The district is divided into six subdistricts (tambons), which are further subdivided into 69 villages (mubans).

| | Subdistricts | People | Villages |
| 1 | Bang Muang | 20,799 | 15 |
| 2 | Bang Mae Nang | 57,307 | 18 |
| 3 | Bang Len | 21,267 | 11 |
| 4 | Sao Thong Hin | 41,630 | 8 |
| 5 | Bang Yai | 23,632 | 6 |
| 6 | Ban Mai | 10,659 | 11 |
| | Total | 175,294 | 69 |

=== Local government ===
There are total seven municipalities in the district. Bang Mae Nang, Sao Thong Hin, Ban Bang Muang and Ban Len have town (thesaban mueang) status, covering most parts of the same-named subdistricts. Bang Yai town municipality covers parts of Bang Yai, Bang Mae Nang and Bang Mai subdistricts.
Bang Yai subdistrict (thesaban tambon) municipality covers the remaining area of Bang Yai subdistrict. Bang Muang subdistrict municipality covers parts of Bang Len, Bang Muang and Sao Thong Hin subdistricts.

| Bang Mae Nang town mun. | 18,564 | Bang Yai subdistrict | 8,974 |
| Sao Thong Hin town mun. | 40,539 | Bang Mae Nang subd. | 4,139 |
| Ban Bang Muang town mun. | 18,717 | Bang Mai subdistrict | 1,013 |
| Bang Len town mun. | 18,564 | Bang Yai town mun. | 14,126 |

| Bang Yai subdistrict municipality | 14,658 |

| Bang Len subdistrict | 2,703 |
| Bang Muang subdistrict | 2,082 |
| Sao Thong Hin subdistrict | 1,091 |
| Bang Muang subdistrict mun. | 5,876 |

The non-municipal area is administered by one Subdistrict Administrative Organization - SAO (ongkan borihan suan tambon - oh boh toh).

| Ban Mai Subdistrict Admin. Org. | 9,646 |

== Education ==
Educational institutions from primary to vocational education in the district is as follows:

=== Vocational education ===
- Department of Skill Development.
- Wanich Business Administration Technological College.

=== Secondary education ===
- Total two upper secondary schools with 1,153 students.
- Total two lower secondary schools with 1,759 students.

=== Primary education ===
- Total ten primary schools with 4,514 pupils.

== Health ==
=== Government hospital ===
There is one community hospital in Bang Yai district.

- Bang Yai Hospital with 104 beds.

=== Private hospital ===
There is one private hospital in the district:

- Kasemrad International Hospital Rattanathibeth with 133 beds.

=== Health promoting hospitals ===
There are total eight health-promoting hospitals in the district.

=== Clinics ===
Around 64 clinics are in Bang Kruai district.

== Environment ==
Bang Yai as well as neighbouring Mueang Nonthaburi and Bang Kruai is the last natural habitat of the Alexandrine parakeet and red-breasted parakeet, a medium-sized parrot in Bangkok Metropolitan Region. They live in groups on large trees in some local temples, such as Wat Suan Yai, Wat Utthayan, Wat Ampawan, Wat Chaloem Phra Kiat Worawihan.

== Places ==
=== Shopping ===
- Central WestGate
