= Bang Kruai district =

Bang Kruai บางกรวย
- District
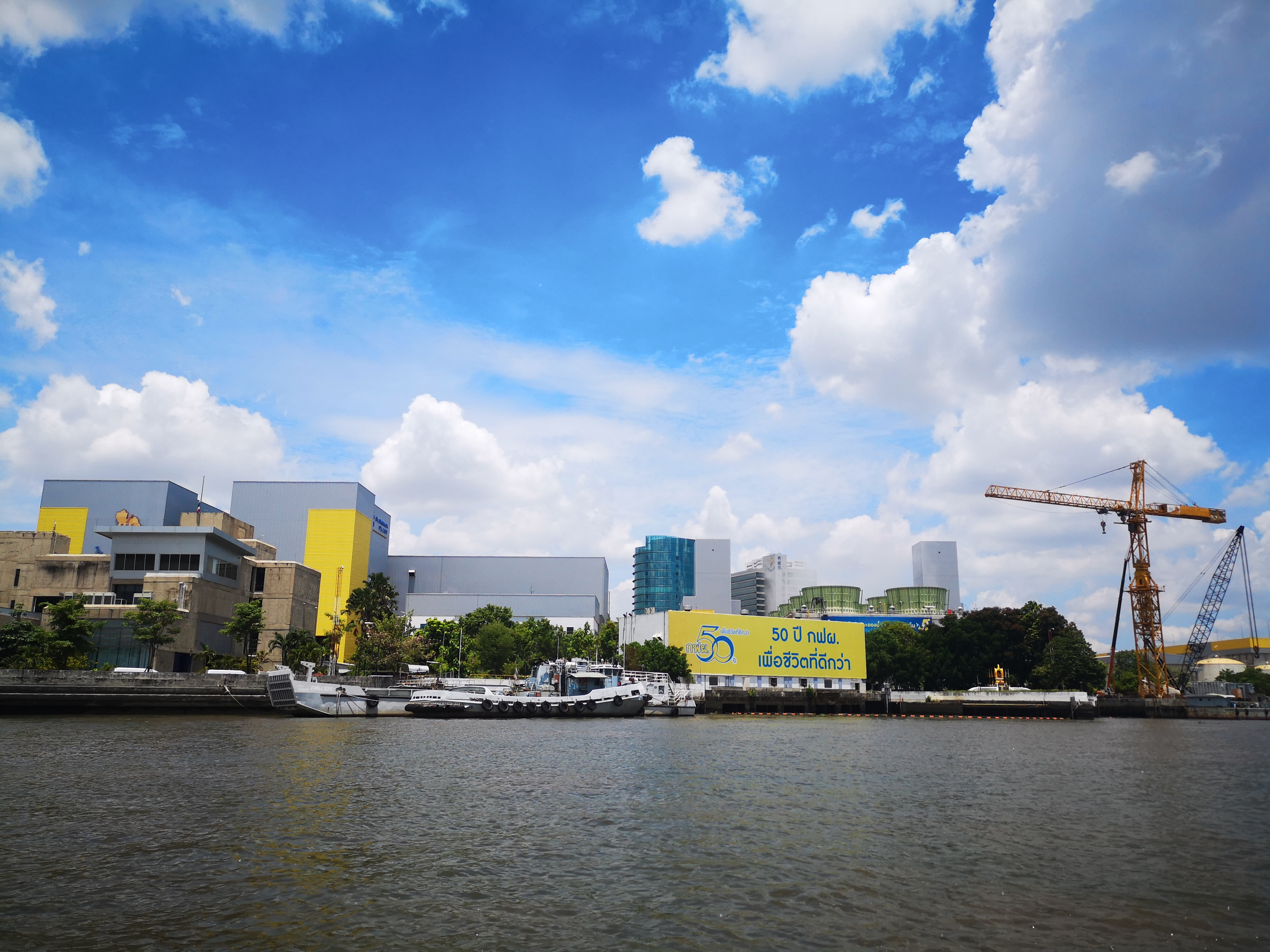
- North Bangkok Power Plant, also familiarly Bang Kruai Power Plant
- Interactive map of Bang Kruai
- Coordinates: 13°48′19″N 100°28′22″E
- Country: Thailand
- Province: Nonthaburi
- Seat: Wat Chalo
- Tambon: 9
- Muban: 60
- District established: 1904

Area
  - Total: 57.4 km^{2} (22.2 sq mi)

Population (2025)
  - Total: 156,626
  - Density: 2,728/km^{2} (7,070/sq mi)
- Time zone: UTC+7
- Postal code: 11030
- Calling code: 02
- ISO 3166 code: TH-1202

Bang Kruai (Thai: บางกรวย, pronounced [bāːŋ krūa̯j]) is a district (amphoe) in the southern part of Nonthaburi province, central Thailand.

== History ==
The district was created in 1904 and named Bang Yai. Due to its size it was difficult to administer, and thus in 1917 the northern part was split off as minor district (king amphoe), Bang Mae Nang. In 1921 Bang Mae Nang became a full district.

On 19 October 1930 the district was renamed "Bang Kruai", after the geographic shape of district. Kruai is the Thai word for 'cone'. On the same date, Bang Mae Nang received the old name of the district, "Bang Yai".

== Geography ==
Neighbouring districts are (from north clockwise) Bang Yai, Mueang Nonthaburi, the districts Bang Sue, Bang Phlat, Taling Chan, Thawi Watthana of Bangkok, and finally Phutthamonthon (Nakhon Pathom province).

== Religion ==
Most people in Bang Kruai district are Buddhist. There are total 50 Theravada Buddhist temples in the district, of which 49 Maha Nikai and 1 Dhammayut temples.
Further there are 2 Christian churches in the district.

== Administrative divisions ==
District location in Nonthaburi province

=== Provincial government ===
The district is divided into nine subdistricts (tambons), which are further subdivided into 60 villages (mubans).

	Subdistricts	People	Villages
1	Wat Chalo	17,461	10
2	Bang Kruai	26,839	9
3	Bang Si Thong	11,872	5
4	Bang Khanun	8,579	5
5	Bang Khun Kong	11,676	6
6	Bang Khu Wiang	11,205	7
7	Maha Sawat	23,252	7
8	Plai Bang	20,053	5
9	Sala Klang	25,689	6
	Total	156,626	60

=== Local government ===
There are total four municipalities in the district. Plai Bang, Bang Kruai and Sala Klang have town (thesaban mueang) status. Bang Si Thong has subdistrict (thesaban tambon} status.

Map of district with four municipalities

Plai Bang town mun.	People	Bang Kruai town mun.	People
Plai Bang subdistrict	20,053	Bang Kruai subdistrict	26,839
Maha Sawat subdistrict	17,796	Wat Chalo subdistrict	17,461
Bang Khu Wiang subd.	11,205	Total	44,320
Total	49,054		

Sala Klang town mun.	25,689	Bang Si Thong sub.mun.	11,872

The non-municipal areas are administered by three Subdistrict Administrative
Organizations - SAO (ongkan borihan suan tambon).

Bang Khanun SAO	8,579
Bang Khun Kong SAO	11,676
Maha Sawat SAO	5,456

== Education ==
Educational institutions from primary to high education in the district is as follows:

=== High education ===
- Rajapruk University.

=== Secondary education ===
- Total 3 upper secondary schools with 1,153 students.
- Total 4 lower secondary schools with 2,852 students.

=== Primary education ===
- Total 12 primary schools with 4,512 pupils.

== Health ==
=== Government hospitals ===
There are two community hospitals in Bang Kruai district.

- Bang Kruai Hospital with 60 beds.
- Nonthaburi Medical Center with 30 beds.

=== Private hospital ===
There is one private hospital in the district:

- Anan Phatthana 2 Hospital with 50 beds.

=== Health promoting hospitals ===
There are total 11 health-promoting hospitals in the district.

=== Clinics ===
Around 59 clinics are in Bang Kruai district.

== Environment ==
Bang Kruai as well as neighbouring Bang Yai and Mueang Nonthaburi is the last natural habitat of the Alexandrine parakeet and red-breasted parakeet, a medium-sized parrot in Bangkok Metropolitan Region. They live in groups on large trees in some local temples, such as Wat Suan Yai, Wat Utthayan, Wat Ampawan, Wat Chaloem Phra Kiat Worawihan.
