= Bang Phai MRT station =

Railway station in Bangkok, Thailand

Bang Phai บางไผ่

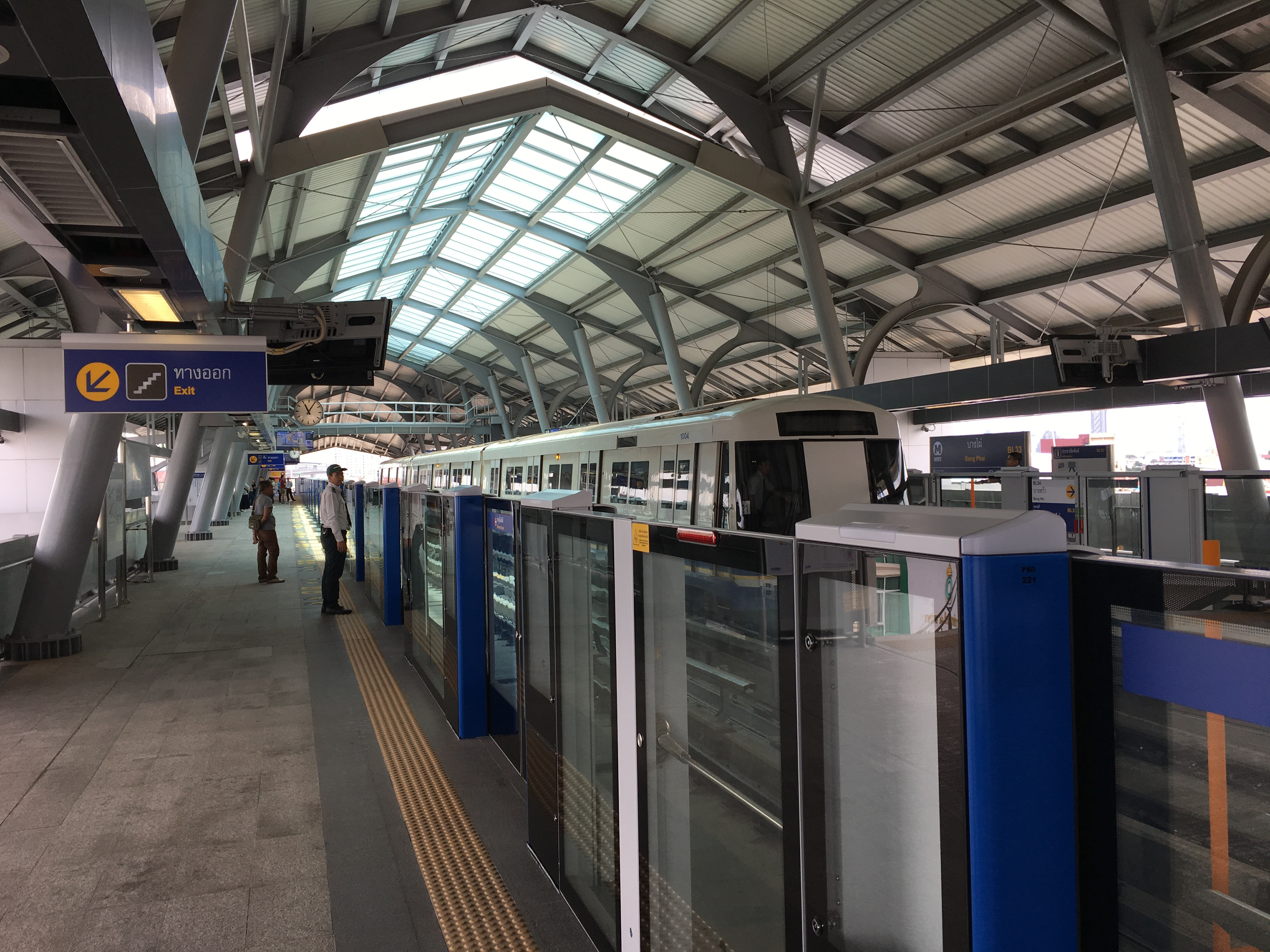
- Platform of Bang Phai MRT station

General information
- Location: Pak Khlong Phasi Charoen Subdistrict, Phasi Charoen District, Bangkok, Thailand
- Coordinates: 13°43′28.44″N 100°27′53″E
- System: MRT
- Owner: Mass Rapid Transit Authority of Thailand (MRTA)
- Operator: Bangkok Expressway and Metro Public Company Limited (BEM)
- Line: MRT MRT Blue Line
- Platforms: 2 side platforms (4 exits, 2 elevators)

Construction
- Structure type: Elevated

Other information
- Station code: BL33

History
- Opened: 24 August 2019; 6 years ago

Passengers
- 2021: 523,765

Services
| Preceding station | Metropolitan Rapid Transit | Following station |
|---|---|---|
| Bang Wa towards Lak Song | Blue Line | Tha Phra towards Tha Phra via Bang Sue |
Location

Bang Phai station (Thai: สถานีบางไผ่, pronounced [sā.tʰǎː.nīː bāːŋ pʰàj]) is a Bangkok MRT rapid transit station on the Blue Line, above Phet Kasem Road in Bangkok, Thailand, in the area known as "Bang Phai" (the beginning of Khlong Phasi Charoen). Not to be confused with the Khlong Bang Phai station on the Purple Line.

== Viaduct ==
This station is unique in that it features a viaduct crossing over the tracks to the other side. It was specially built to allow the relics of the Buddha to be carried along the canal during the annual Chak Phra festival of nearby Wat Nang Chi. According to tradition, the relic must not pass under any bridge or road. A similar viaduct exists at Bang Khun Non station for the same ceremonial reason.

== Neighbourhoods ==
- Wat Paknam Bhasicharoen
- Wat Nang Chi Chotikaram
- Wat Nuannoradit
- Khlong Bang Luang Artist House and Khlong Bang Luang Floating Market
- Wat Kamphaeng Bangchak
- Wat Absorn Sawan
- Bangphai General Hospital
- Phyathai 3 Hospital

== Gallery ==
Bang Phai Station Traditional Sign

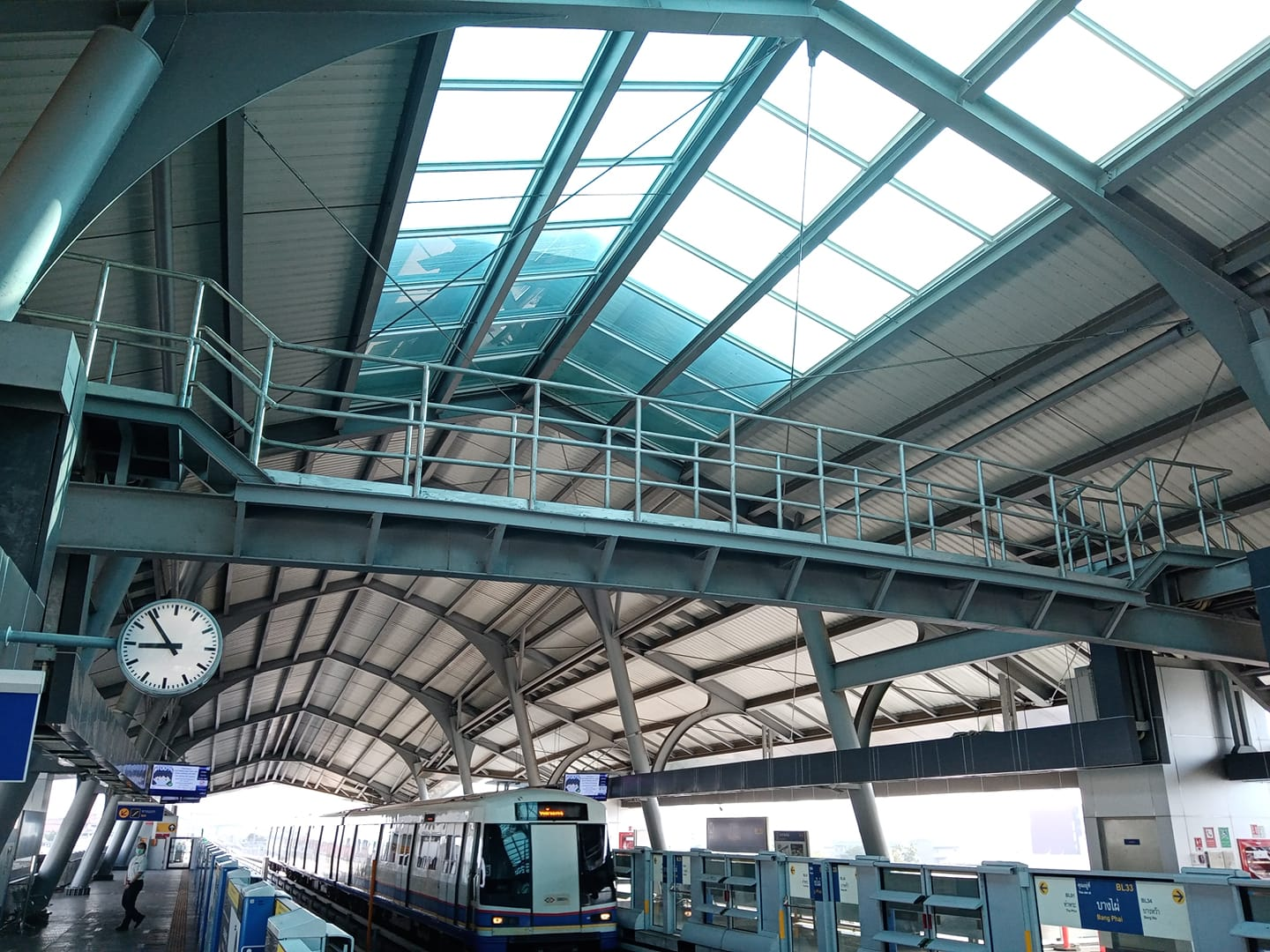
Bang Phai MRT station's viaduct
