= Khuha Sawan, Bangkok =

Khuha Sawan คูหาสวรรค์
- Khwaeng
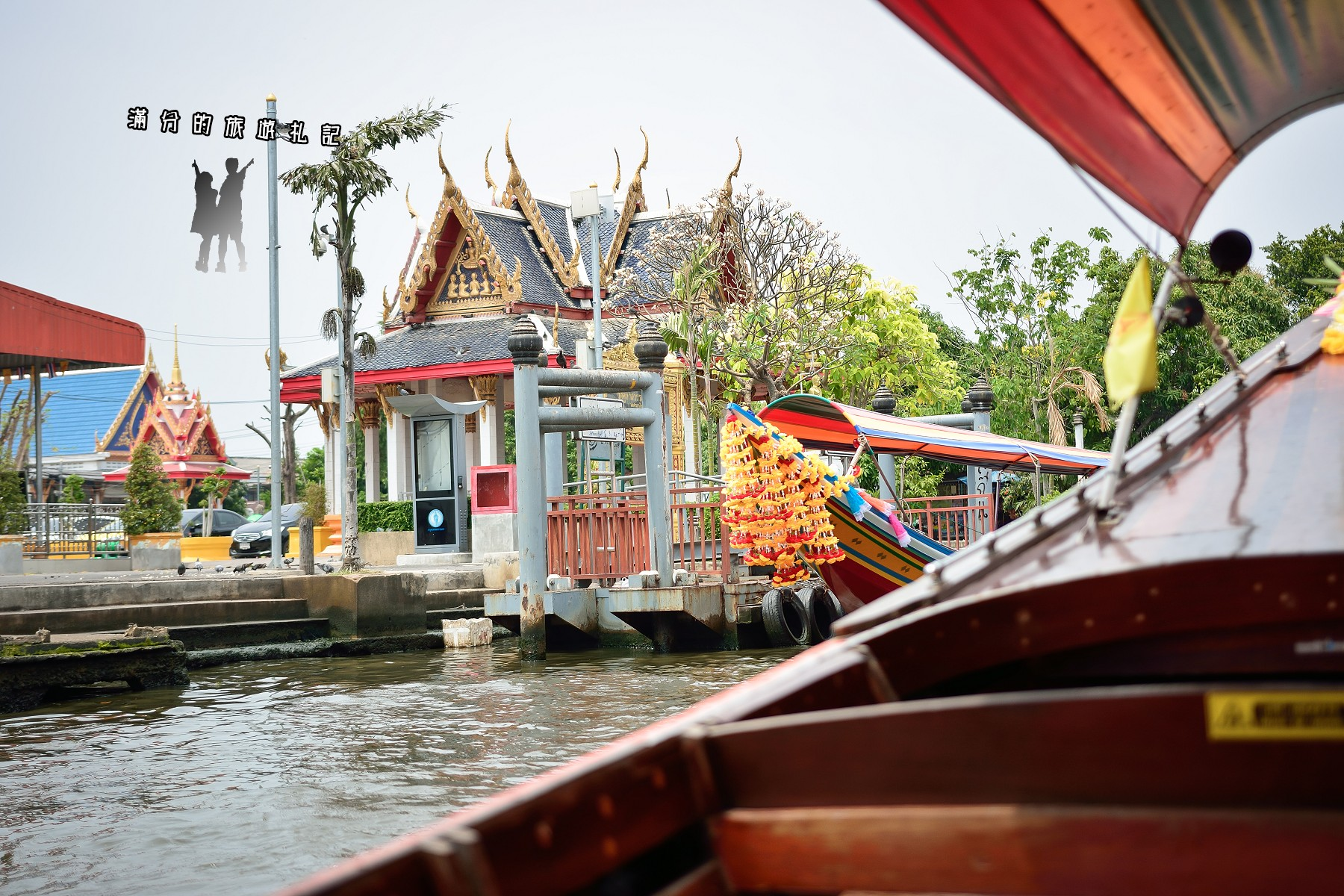
- Wat Khuha Sawan, an eponymous

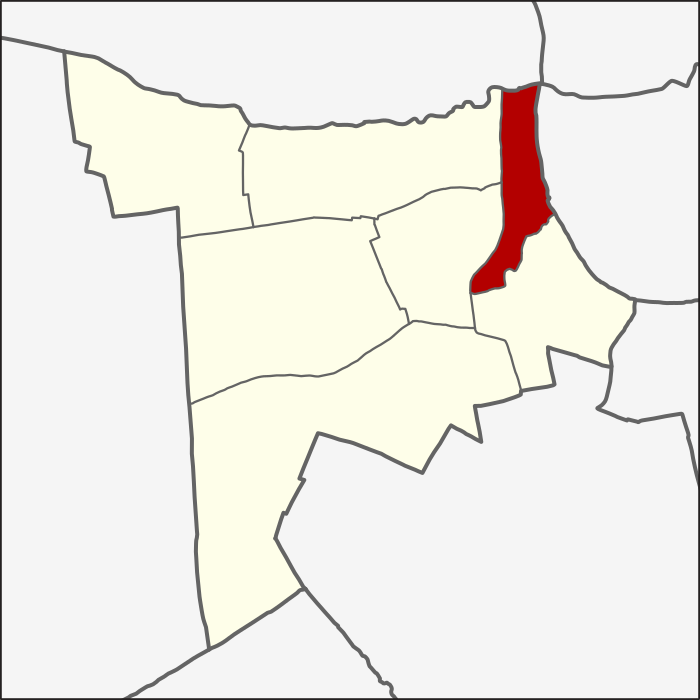
- Location in Phasi Charoen District
- Country: Thailand
- Province: Bangkok
- Khet: Phasi Charoen

Area
  - Total: 0.909 km^{2} (0.351 sq mi)

Population (2020)
  - Total: 6,063
- Time zone: UTC+7 (ICT)
- Postal code: 10160
- TIS 1099: 102210

Khuha Sawan (Thai: คูหาสวรรค์, pronounced [kʰūː.hǎː sā.wǎn]) is a khwaeng (subdistrict) of Phasi Charoen District, in Bangkok, Thailand. In 2020, it had a total population of 6,063 people.

== Denomination ==
Its name Khuha Sawan (lit: "celestial cavern") after a local temple, Wat Khuha Sawan, a historic Buddhist temple, formerly known as Wat Sala Si Na (วัดศาลาสี่หน้า).

== Geography ==
It is sort of shaped like a boot with toe not far from the Bang Wa BTS Skytrain and Bang Wa MRT Subway stations. It shares a border with sister subdistrict Pak Khlong Phasi Charoen. Both areas are informally known collectively as "Bang Phai".

Khuha Sawan borders Bang Phrom and Khlong Chak Phra to the north (Khlong Bang Chueak Nang is a borderline), Bang Khun Si and Wat Tha Phra to the east (Khlong Bang Khun Si, Khlong Mon and Khlong Bangkok Yai are the borderlines), Pak Khlong Phasi Charoen to the south (Khlong Bang Chak is a borderline), Bang Chak and Bang Waek to the west.

It has a total area of 0.909 km^{2} (0.351 sq mi). Regarded as the smallest administrative area of Phasi Charoen District.

== Places ==
- Khlong Bang Luang Artist House, also referred to as Bann Silapin
- Wat Khuha Sawan
- Wat Paknam Fang Tai
- Wat Wichitkarnnimit (Wat Nang)
- Wat Nok
- Wat Bang Waek
- Wat Bot Ittharasanpetch
- Sutham Suksa School and Wat Suwan Khiri (abandoned)
- Thonburi Commercial College
- Bang Sao Thong Police Station
- Sujinwadee School
