= Pak Khlong Phasi Charoen =

Coordinates: 13°43′28.9″N 100°27′44.1″E

Pak Khlong Phasi Charoen ปากคลองภาษีเจริญ
- Khwaeng
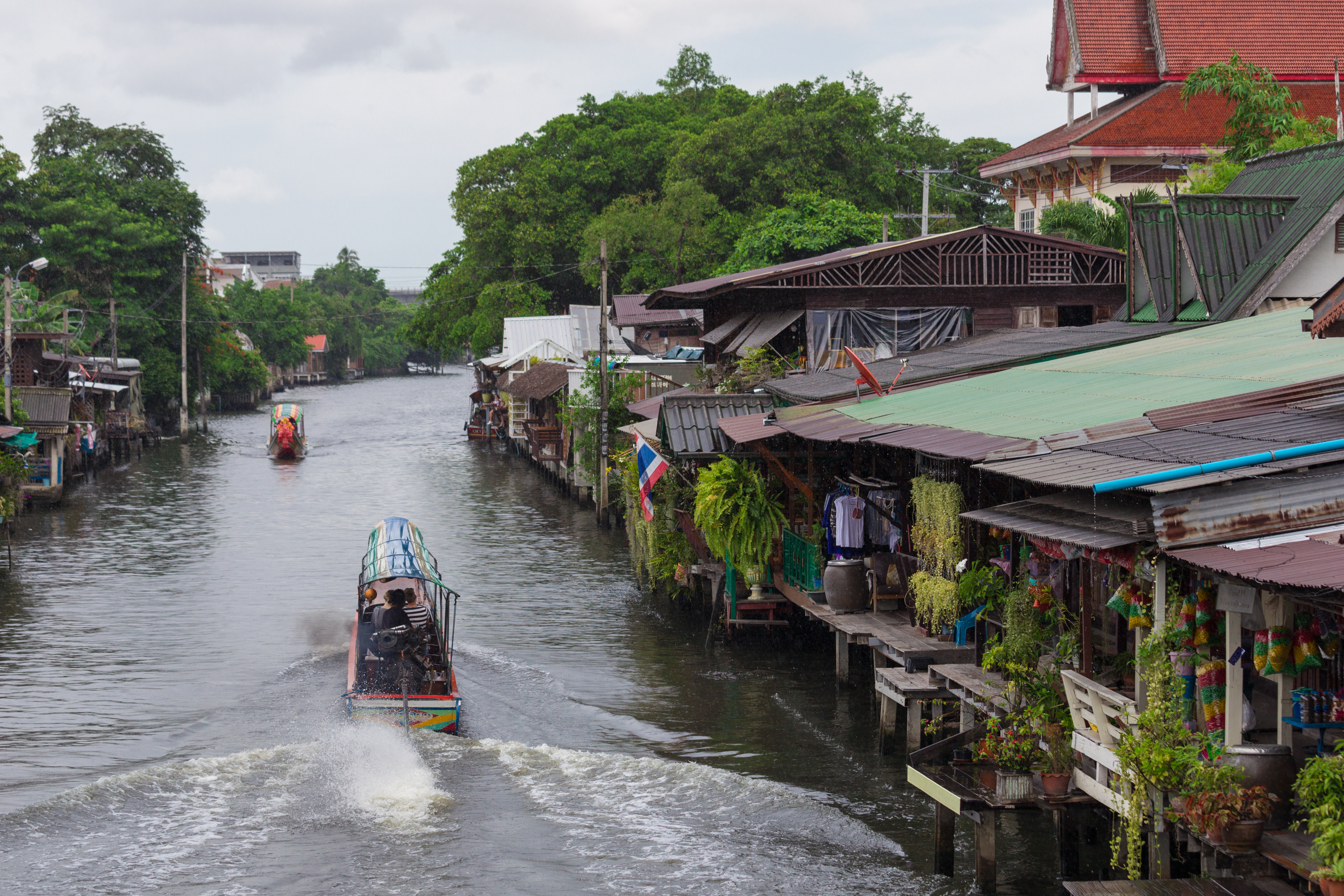
- Khlong Bangkok Yai, also known as Khlong Bang Luang and Khlong Bang Luang Floating Market.

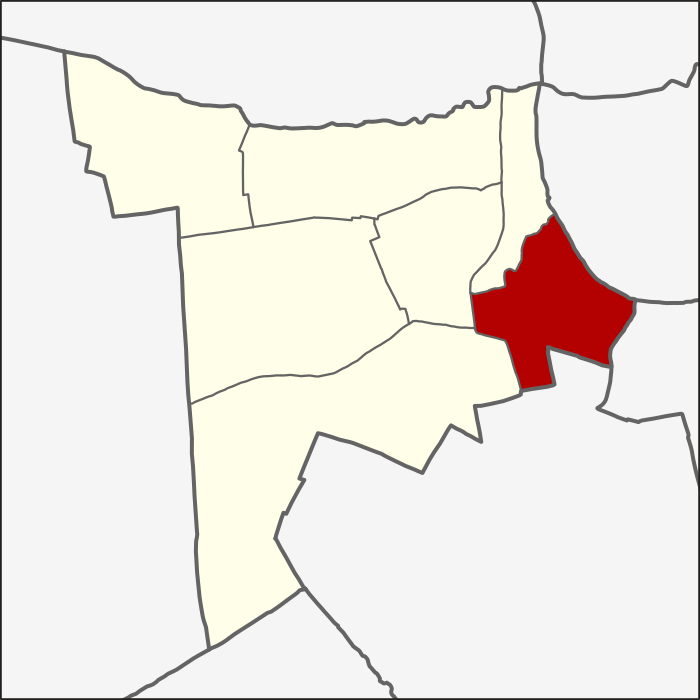
- Location in Phasi Charoen District
- Country: Thailand
- Province: Bangkok
- Khet: Phasi Charoen

Area
  - Total: 1.898 km^{2} (0.733 sq mi)

Population (2018)
  - Total: 14,778
  - Density: 7,786.09/km^{2} (20,165.9/sq mi)
- Time zone: UTC+7 (ICT)
- Postal code: 10160
- TIS 1099: 102209

Pak Khlong Phasi Charoen (Thai: ปากคลองภาษีเจริญ, pronounced [pàːk kʰlɔ̄ːŋ pʰāː.sǐː t͡ɕā.rɤ̄ːn]) is a khwaeng (sub-district) of Phasi Charoen District, Bangkok's Thonburi side.

== Geography ==
Its name "Pak Khlong Phasi Charoen" meaning "mouth of Phasi Charoen canal", because it is the confluence of khlongs (canal) Phasi Charoen and Bangkok Yai, regarded as the beginning of Khlong Phasi Charoen include the nearby area, also with a Khlong Dan that is separated from Khlong Bangkok Yai as well.

The area is the southeast part of the district, with a total area of 0.50 km^{2} (0.19 mi^{2}), it is the second-smallest subdistrict of the district (after Khuha Sawan).

Neighbouring subdistricts are (from the north clockwise): Khuha Sawan and Bang Chak in its district, Wat Tha Phra of Bangkok Yai District, Talat Phlu of Thon Buri District, and Bang Wa in its district.

National Highway 4 (Phet Kasem Road) is the main road. Ratchaphruek and Thoet Thai Roads are classified as minor road.

Bang Phai is a popular name used to call this area (shared with Khuha Sawan).

== Places ==
- Wat Paknam Bhasicharoen
- Wat Nang Chi Chotikaram
- Wat Nuannoradit
- Wat Absorn Sawan
- Wat Nakprok
- Wat Thong Sala Ngarm
- Wat Kamphaeng Bang Chak
- Wat Pradu Bang Chak
- Wat Pleang
- Phyathai 3 Hospital
- Bang Wa BTS station
- Phet Kasem Interchange
- Seni Market
- Bangphai General Hospital
- Phai Thong Niwet Village
- Khlong Bang Luang Floating Market
- Bang Phai MRT station
- Bang Phai Bridge
