= Phasi Charoen district =

District in Bangkok, Thailand

Phasi Charoen ภาษีเจริญ
- Khet
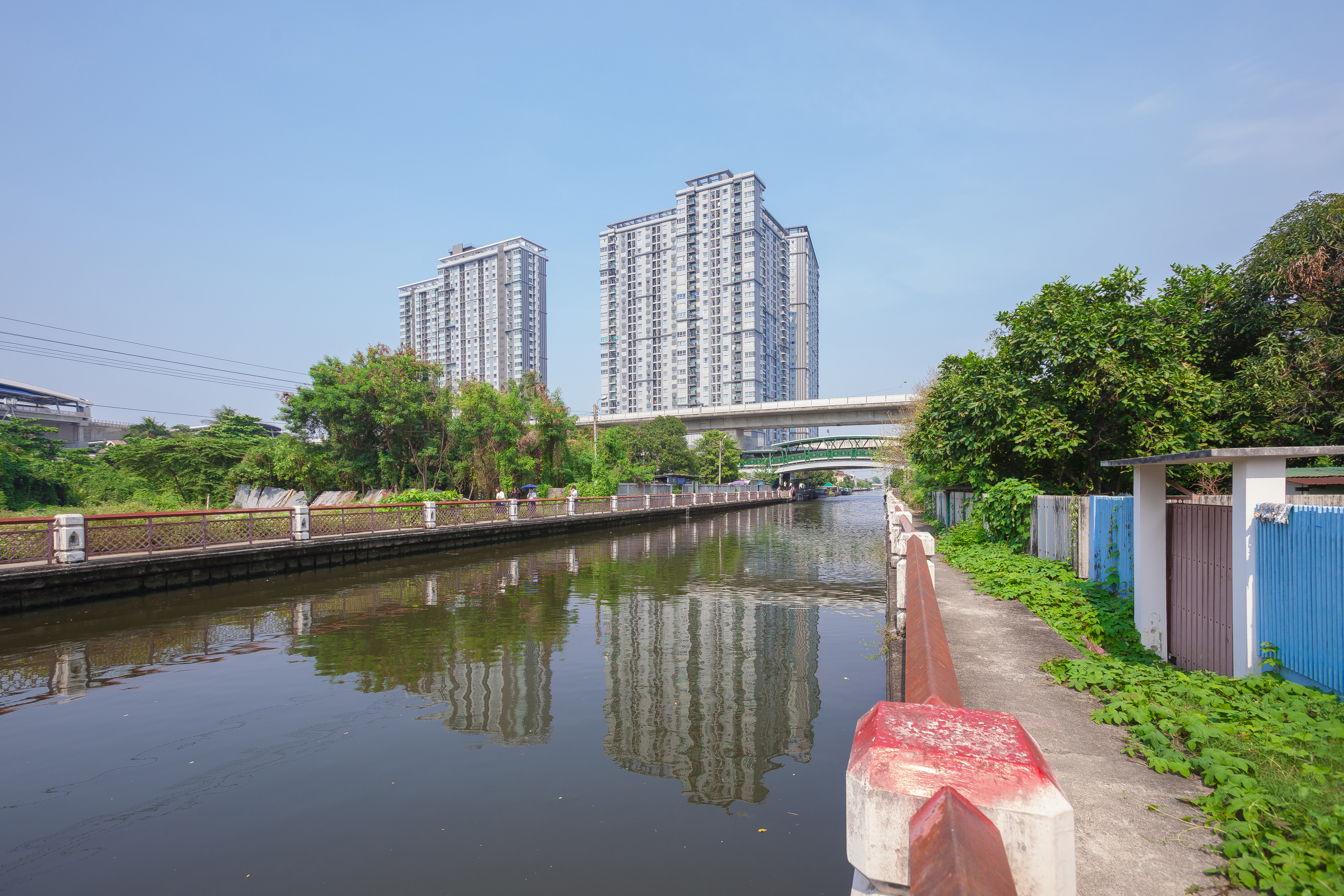
- Khlong Phasi Charoen near Bang Wa BTS station

- Khet location in Bangkok
- Coordinates: 13°42′53″N 100°26′14″E
- Country: Thailand
- Province: Bangkok
- Seat: Bang Wa
- Khwaeng: 7

Area
  - Total: 17.834 km^{2} (6.886 sq mi)

Population (2017)
  - Total: 126,824
  - Density: 7,111.36/km^{2} (18,418.3/sq mi)
- Time zone: UTC+7 (ICT)
- Postal code: 10160
- Geocode: 1022

Phasi Charoen (Thai: ภาษีเจริญ, pronounced [pʰāː.sǐː t͡ɕā.rɤ̄ːn]) is one of the 50 districts (Khet) of Bangkok, Thailand. The district is bounded by other Bangkok districts (from north clockwise): Taling Chan, Bangkok Noi, Bangkok Yai, Thon Buri, Chom Thong, Bang Bon, and Bang Khae.

== History ==
The name of the district came from a canal, Khlong Phasi Charoen (คลองภาษีเจริญ), linking Tha Chin River to Khlong Bangkok Yai. The canal project was initiated by Phra Phasi Sombat Boribun (พระภาษีสมบัติบริบูรณ์), who later became Phraya Phison Sombat Boribun (พระยาพิสณฑ์สมบัติบริบูรณ์). Originally Phasi Charoen proposed to fund the project in exchange for the right to collect tolls for passage. It was approved by King Mongkut, however, with the fund given via tax deduction from the amount Phra Phasi Sombat Boriboon had to collect, thus making the canal toll-free. Construction began in 1866 and was completed in 1872 and the canal was named after the man who had overseen the project.

The district was established as Amphoe Phasi Charoen in 1899. It became Khet Phasi Charoen in 1972.

== Administration ==
The district is divided into seven sub-districts (khwaeng).

No.	Name	Thai	Area (km^{2})	Map
1.	Bang Wa	บางหว้า	5.105	Map
2.	Bang Duan	บางด้วน	2.514	Map
6.	Bang Chak	บางจาก	1.394	Map
7.	Bang Waek	บางแวก	3.022	Map
8.	Khlong Khwang	คลองขวาง	2.992	Map
9.	Pak Khlong Phasi Charoen	ปากคลองภาษีเจริญ	1.898	Map
10.	Khuha Sawan	คูหาสวรรค์	0.909	Map
Total			17.834	Map

The missing number 3, 4 and 5 belong to the sub-districts which were split off to form Bang Khae district.

== Places ==
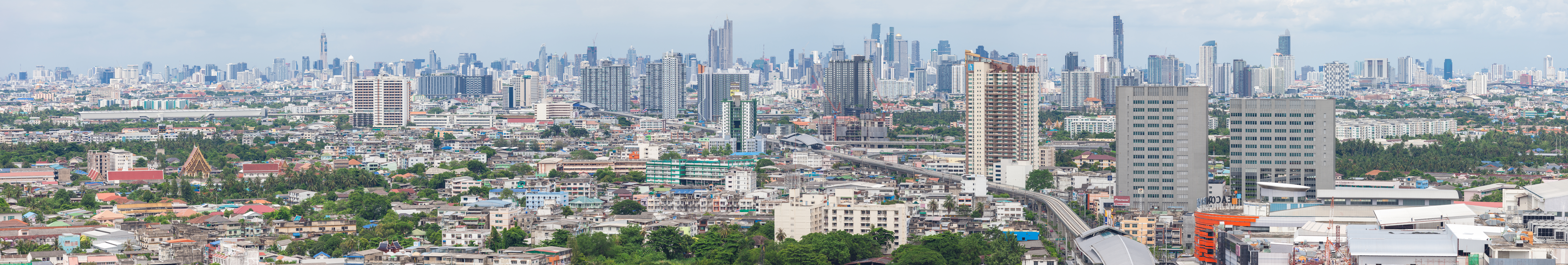
Bangkok in 2018 from Phasi Charoen District.
- Wat Pak Nam Phasi Charoen (วัดปากน้ำภาษีเจริญ)
- Wat Apson Sawan (วัดอัปสรสวรรค์)
- Wat Nak Prok (วัดนาคปรก)
- Wat Nang Chi Worawihan (วัดนางชีวรวิหาร)
- Wat Nuan Noradit Worawihan (วัดนวลนรดิศวรวิหาร)
- Wat Nimmanoradi (วัดนิมมานรดี)
- Wat Thong Sala Ngarm (วัดทองศาลางาม)
- Wat Kamphaeng Bangchak (วัดกำแพงบางจาก)
- Wat Khuha Sawan (วัดคูหาสวรรค์)
- Wat Chan Pradittharam (วัดจันทร์ประดิษฐาราม)
- Wat Ko Non (วัดโคนอน)
- Wat Ang Kaew (วัดอ่างแก้ว)
- Wat Rang Bua (วัดรางบัว)
- Wat Chai Chimplee (วัดไชยฉิมพลี)
- Wat Talom (วัดตะล่อม)
- Wat Paknam Fang Tai (วัดปากน้ำฝั่งใต้)
- Chao Pho Sua Shrine (ศาลเจ้าพ่อเสือ)
- Siam University (มหาวิทยาลัยสยาม)
- Khlong Bang Luang Floating Market (ตลาดน้ำคลองบางหลวง) and Baan Sinlapin (บ้านศิลปิน)

== Shopping ==
- Seacon Bangkae

== Transportation ==
- The district is crossed by the Blue Line of the Bangkok MRT with four stations: Bang Phai, Bang Wa, Phetkasem 48, and Phasi Charoen. Bang Wa station is an interchange station connect to Silom Line of the BTS Skytrain.
- There is also Khlong Phasi Charoen boat service running along Khlong Phasi Charoen with one of the pier connected with Bang Wa BTS station.
