= Wat Khuha Sawan (Bangkok) =

Buddhist temple in Bangkok, Thailand

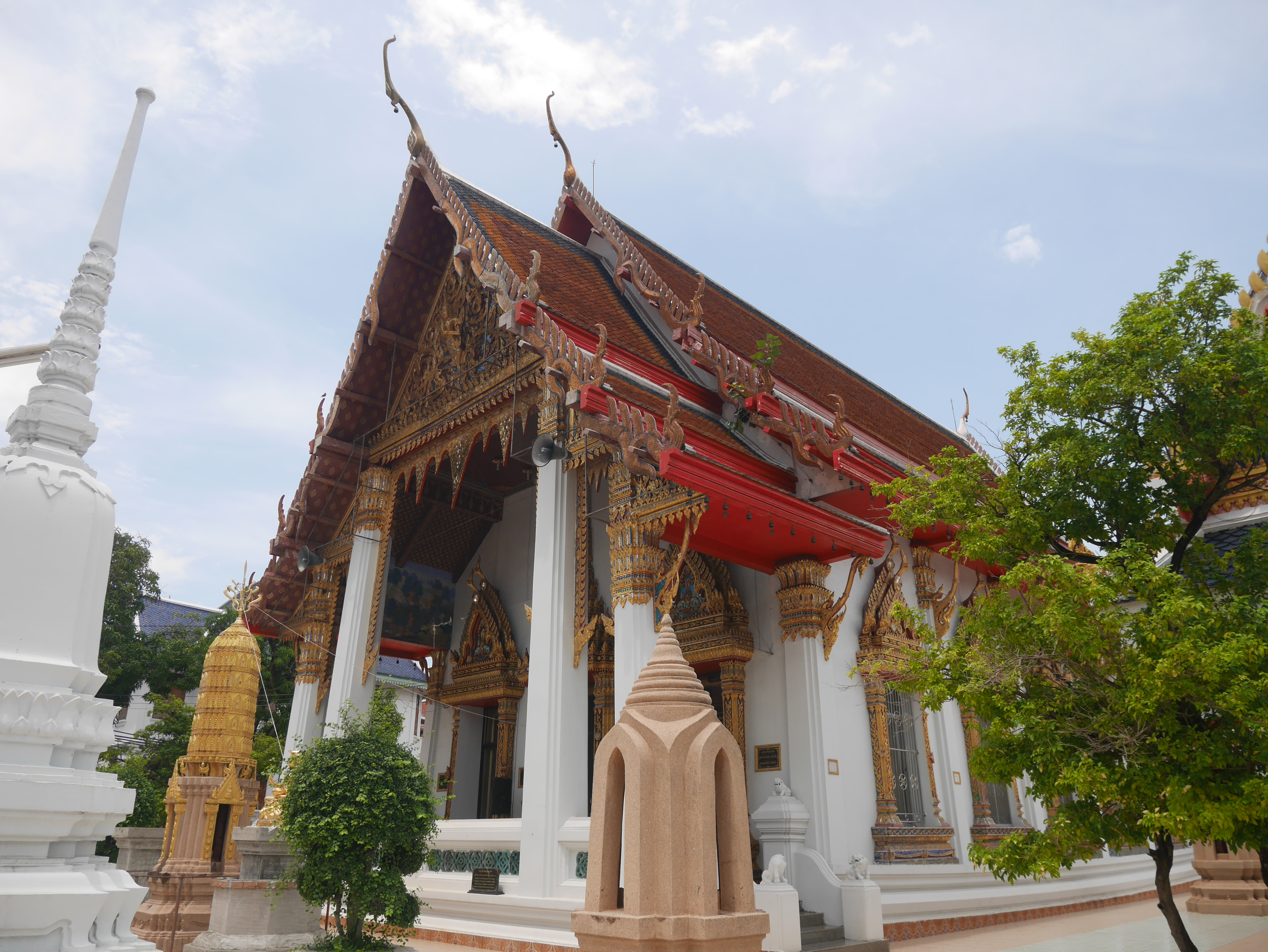
- The ubosot

- Location within Bangkok

Religion
- Affiliation: Buddhism
- Sect: Theravāda Mahā Nikāya
- Status: Third-class royal temple

Location
- Location: 233 Soi Phet Kasem 28 (lane 22), Phet Kasem Rd, Khuha Sawan, Phasi Charoen, Bangkok 10160
- Country: Thailand
- Interactive map of Wat Khuha Sawan
- Coordinates: 13.732275°N 100.461883°E

Architecture
- Founder: unknown

Wat Khuha Sawan or full name Wat Kuha Sawan Worawihan (Thai: วัดคูหาสวรรค์, pronounced [wát kʰūː.hǎː sā.wǎn], วัดคูหาสวรรค์วรวิหาร, pronounced [wát kʰūː.hǎː sā.wǎn wɔ̄ːráʔwíʔhǎːn]) is a historic Buddhist temple in Phasi Charoen District, Bangkok.

== History ==
Wat Kuha Sawan dates all the way back to the late Ayutthaya period, without knowing who created it. What remains and shows the Ayutthaya period architecture is the gable pattern carved in wood on both the front and back of the ubosot (ordination hall). The wings of the small gable along the roof are lowered by two wings on each side. It is the craftsmanship of artisans in the Ayutthaya period and sema stones (temple boundary stone) that are a pair of colours made of red sandstone late Ayutthaya craftsmanship.

As for the sema arch, it was built later. The original sema was enshrined on a cement pedestal only.

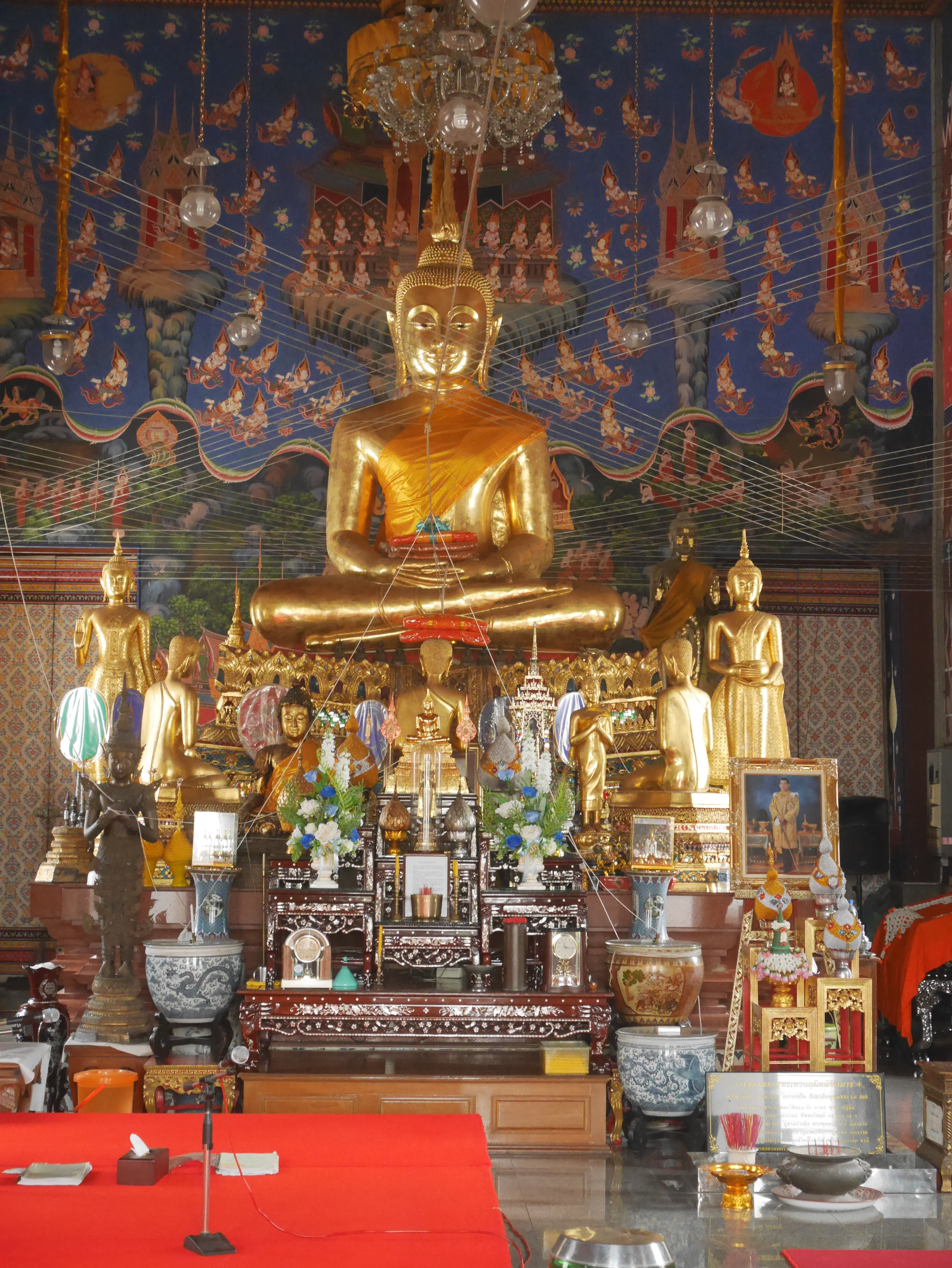
Luang Pho Phong, the principle Buddha image

King Rama I have restored the whole temple along with the renamed from "Wat Sala Si Na" (วัดศาลาสี่หน้า, "four-fronted pavilion temple") to Wat Khuha Sawan ("celestial cavern temple").

This temple used to have a large bronze Buddha image in the early Ayutthaya period art. Later, King Rama I, he was invited to be enshrined as the principal Buddha image in Wat Pho in Rattanakosin Island until the present.

Nowadays, it can be regarded as a third-class royal temple in worawihan category.

Typically, the ubosot is generally not open to go inside, but has beautiful architecture and is well viewed from a canal boat along Khlong Bangkok Yai, the temple location.

== Neighbourhoods ==
Around the temple there are many places of interest include Khlong Bang Luang Artist House, Khlong Bang Luang Traditional Waterside Community, Wat Kamphaeng Bang Chak, which are all cultural attractions.

At the back of the temple (in front of the temple is a canal) is a small pathway parallel to the Khlong Bangkok Yai leads to a local kindergarten and elementary school, Sutham Suksa. Within the school is located an abandoned temple called "Wat Suwan Khiri" (วัดสุวรรณคีรี), assumed that it is an ancient temple that has existed since the late Ayutthaya period as well. But now only the principle Buddha image in the attitude of meditation, is left named "Luang Pho Suwan Khiri" (หลวงพ่อสุวรรณคีรี) enshrined in a Chinese style shrine. The temple has been uninhabited since the reign of King Rama VI, due to the unavailability of resident priests, and was later incorporated into Wat Kuha Sawan. To this day people still come to ask for blessings for their wellbeing from Luang Pho Suwan Khiri.
