= Wat Nak Prok =

Buddhist temple in Bangkok, Thailand

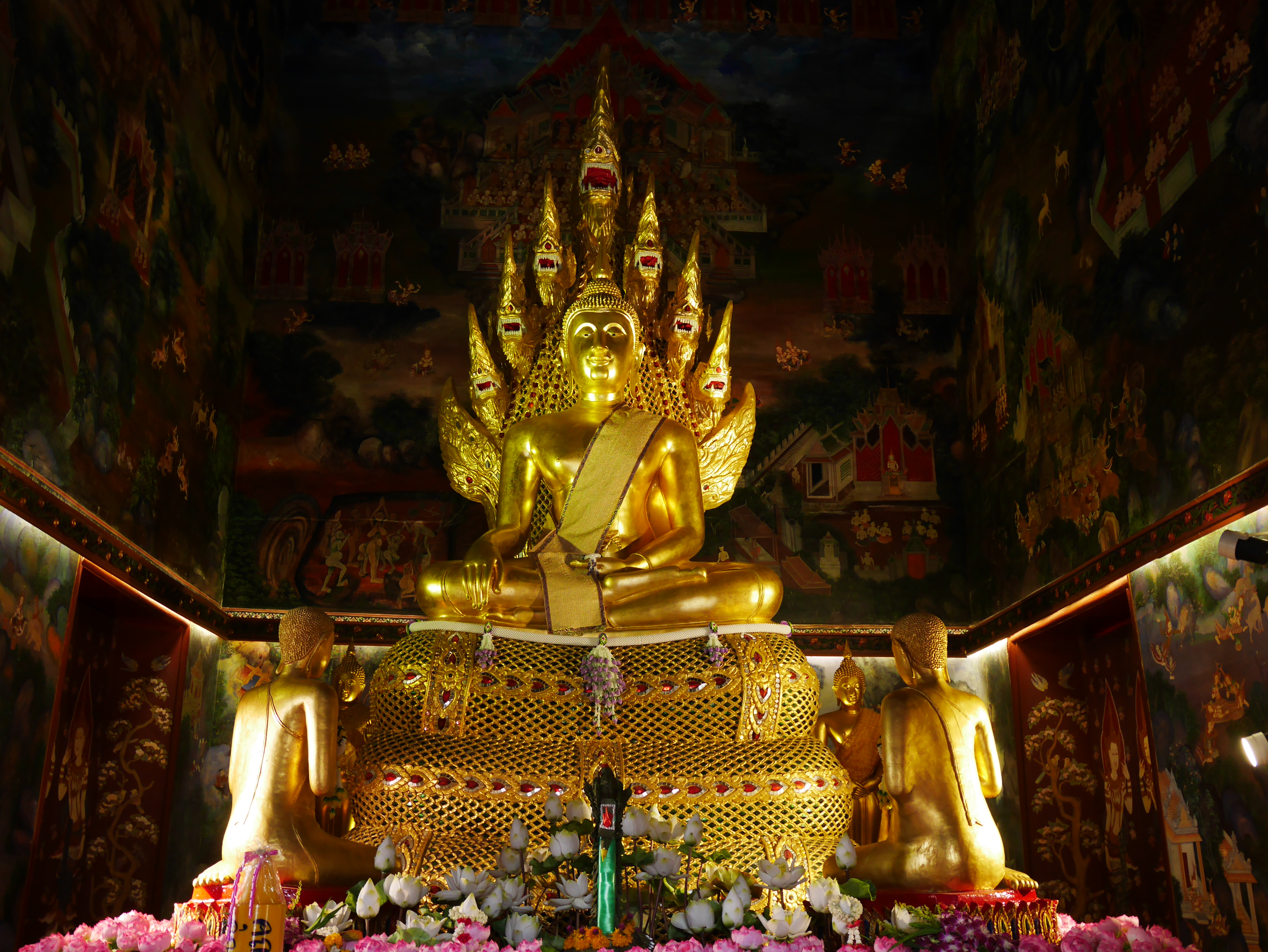
- Luang Pho Nak Prok

- Location within Bangkok

Religion
- Affiliation: Buddhism
- Sect: Theravāda Mahā Nikāya
- Status: Private temple

Location
- Location: 342 Soi Thoet Thai 49, Pak Khlong Phasi Charoen, Phasi Charoen, Bangkok
- Country: Thailand
- Interactive map of Wat Nak Prok
- Coordinates: 13.7172°N 100.4664°E

Architecture
- Founder: Chinese Phuk
- Completed: 1748 (assumed)

Website
- http://www.watnakprok.org/

Wat Nak Prok (Thai: วัดนาคปรก) is a Thai Buddhist temple in Phasi Charoen District, Bangkok, Thailand. It can be considered as one of the most distinctive temples of the district in addition to nearby Wat Paknam Bhasicharoen. The temple also adjacent Wat Nang Chi to east.

The temple was presumably built in the year 1748 during late Ayutthaya period. It is said that a wealthy Chinese merchant who lives in neighbouring Talat Phlu area named Phuk was the contributor of the temple's building. Vihāra (sanctuary) was dedication to his Thai wife and ubosot (ordination hall) was to himself. The Buddha image was later housed inside vihāra and ubosot. The temple is named Wat Nak Prok after Luang Pho Nak Prok, the most sacred Buddha image made of bronze in Naga Prok attitude (under the shelter of seven-headed Nāga) made of mortar housed inside vihāra. Ubosot originally built in Ayutthaya period style is now being modified in accordance with the later restoration.

Wat Nak Prok was registered to a national ancient monument by the Fine Arts Department in the year 1977.

Besides, Wat Nak Prok is also considered a temple of Wongkrachang family, whose family members include Sarunyu Wongkrachang, a late famous actor and filmmaker, and used as a place of cremation when he died as well.
