= Wat Ang Kaeo (Bangkok) =

- วัดอ่างแก้ว
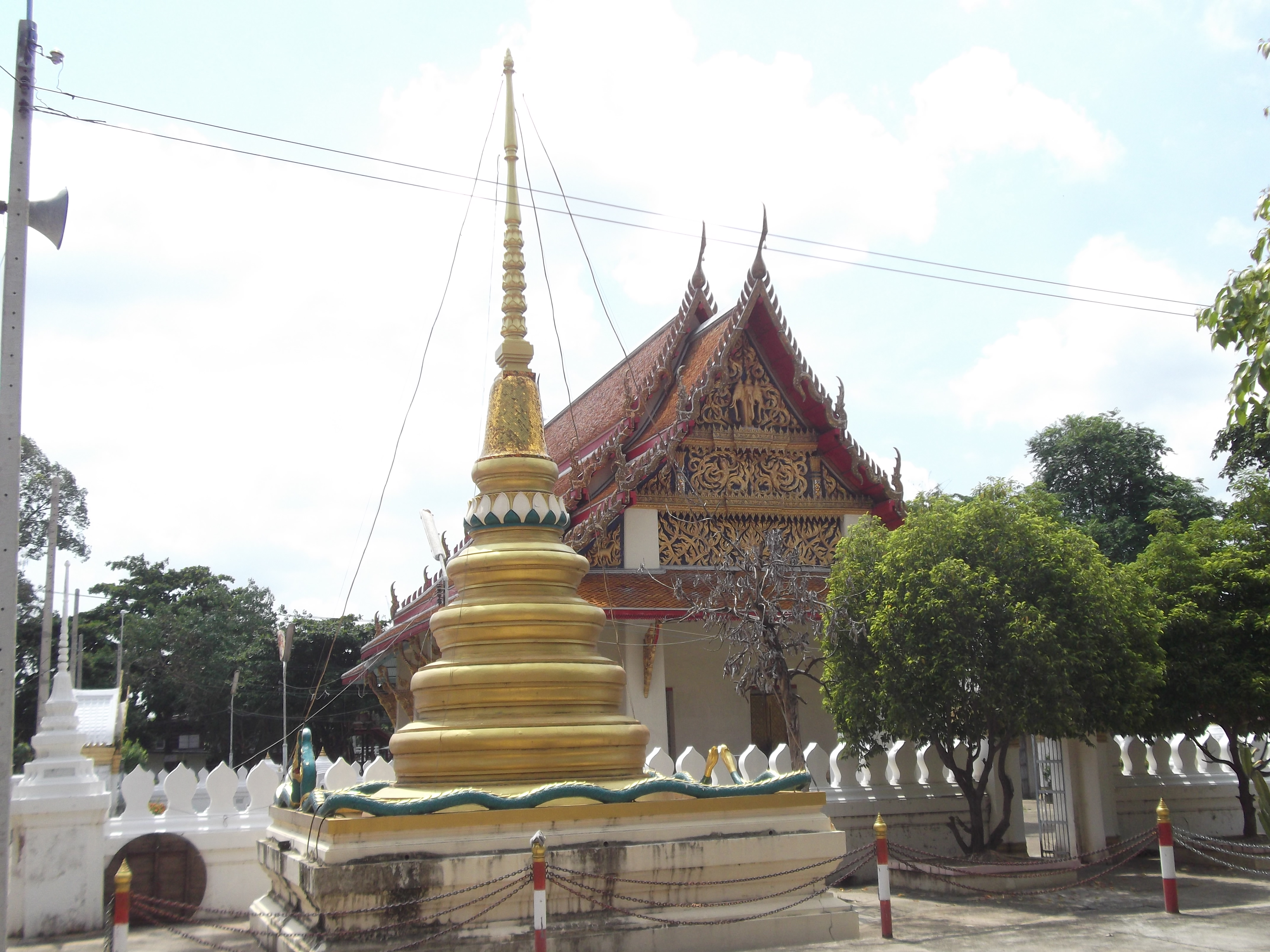
- Outside the ubosot

- Location within Bangkok

Religion
- Affiliation: Buddhism
- Sect: Theravāda Mahā Nikāya
- Status: Private temple

Location
- Location: 30 Thoet Thai Rd, Bang Wa, Phasi Charoen, Bangkok
- Country: Thailand
- Interactive map of Wat Ang Kaeo
- Coordinates: 13.71681°N 100.454574°E

Wat Ang Kaeo (Thai: วัดอ่างแก้ว, pronounced [wát ʔàːŋ kɛ̂ːw]) is a Buddhist temple in Bangkok, Thailand. It is in a bottom of narrow soi (lane) opposite Siam University, the temple situated by a Khlong Phasi Charoen.

Its name "Ang Kaeo" means "crystal bowl" owing to the location that is like being in a basin. Wat Ang Kaeo is an ancient temple that is assumed to have existed since the Ayutthaya period and was restored in the Rattanakosin period around reign of King Rama III or in the reign of King Rama V. It is regarded as the only temple in Bangkok that has a sand terrace. Used for the ceremony create sand pagodas during the Songkran festival (13–15 April) annually.

Although it is only a small temple, but inside the ubosot (main hall) there are the beautiful mural paintings. The principle Buddha image in the attitude of meditation was built in the Rattanakosin period. The upper part of the walls have depictions of the Buddha's life, and behind the principle Buddha image shows Māhāmāyā being visited in heaven by her son, Gautama Buddha. Right opposite the Buddha image depicts The Buddha facing Mara (demon), it was a classic one. Here, Buddha image is in meditation attitude while others are depicted in subduing Mara.

Between windows, there were paintings depicting the ten great past lives of The Buddha. Lower part of the hall walls near the floor are paintings depicting various old Thai idioms, such as "Ping pla prachot maeo" (ปิ้งปลาประชดแมว, "BBQ fish in front of a cat"), and "Sao sai hai ka kin" (สาวไส้ให้กากิน, "bring guts out for crows") etc. Regarded as the only one in Thailand.
