= Khlong Phasi Charoen boat service =

Water transportation in Bangkok, Thailand

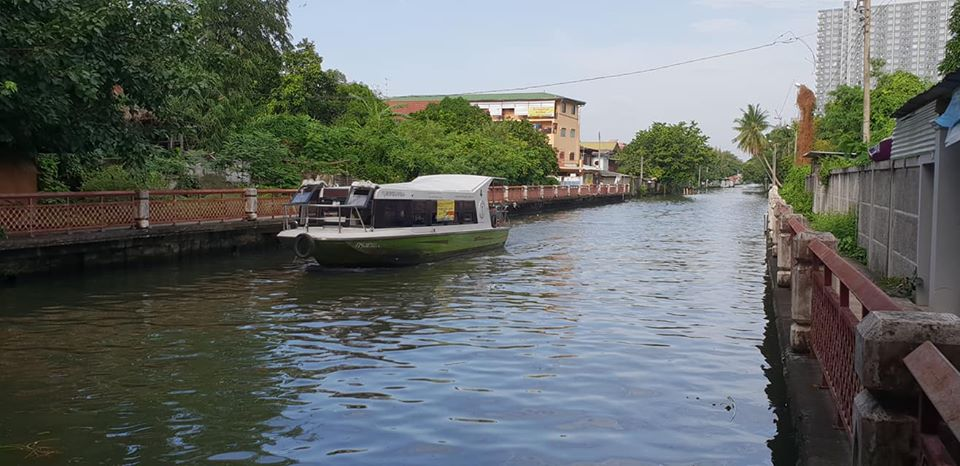
Khlong Phasi Charoen boat service

The Khlong Phasi Charoen Express Boat was a boat service that operates on a 11 kilometre route on the Khlong Phasi Charoen in Bangkok. The service was in operation from 1 April 2016 to alleviate road traffic in the area, operated by Krungthep Thanakom PCL. It runs from Phetkasem 49 Pier to Wat Paknam Phasi Charoen Pier. The Bangkok Metropolitan Administration (BMA) has built a walkway from Bang Wa Pier to Bang Wa Station of the BTS Skytrain. It operates only during peak hours between 06:00–09:00 and 16:00–19:30 at 15-minute intervals on weekdays and 30-minute intervals on weekends.

The service has been suspended since 1 January 2022 in order to construct a tunnel.

== Piers ==
1. Pratunam Phasi Charoen
2. U Rot May Sai 9
3. Saphan Pracharat
4. Bang Wa – connection to Bang Wa station (Silom Line and Blue Line)
5. Wat Ang Kaew
6. Phetkasem 31
7. Wat Rang Bua
8. Phetkasem 35
9. Phetkasem 37
10. Phetkasem 39
11. Wat Nimmanoradee
12. ID Bang Khae
13. Kaset-Bang Khae
14. Phetkasem 41
15. Kanchanaphisek Bridge (not to be confused with Kanchanaphisek Bridge)
16. Muban Suksan 6
17. Phetkasem 53
18. Wat Muang
19. Chumchon Ban Khing
20. Phetkasem 69

An additional service between Bang Wa and Tha Chang pier, on the Chao Phraya River, was in a free trial operation between June and December 2019, but this has been suspended. The route ran along the Bangkok Yai Canal until opening into the Chao Phraya River at Wat Kanlayanamit.The service called at 5 piers which were Wat Intharam, Memorial Bridge, Rajinee and Tha Chang.

== See also ==
- Water transport in Bangkok
