= Bang Chak, Phasi Charoen =

Subdistrict in Bangkok, Thailand

Coordinates: 13°43′43.6″N 100°27′10.7″E

Bang Chak บางจาก
- Khwaeng
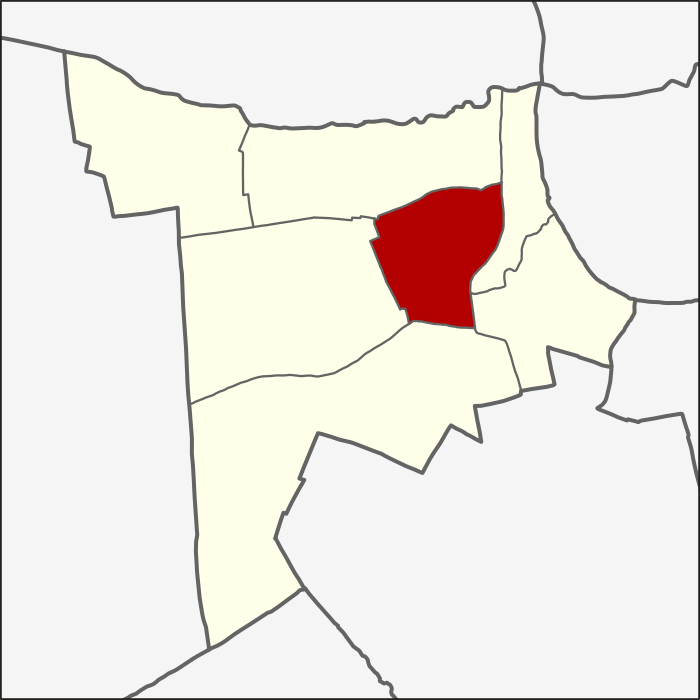
- Location in Phasi Charoen District
- Country: Thailand
- Province: Bangkok
- Khet: Phasi Charoen

Area
  - Total: 1.394 km^{2} (0.538 sq mi)

Population (2020)
  - Total: 8,156
- Time zone: UTC+7 (ICT)
- Postal code: 10160
- TIS 1099: 102206

Bang Chak (Thai: บางจาก, pronounced [bāːŋ t͡ɕàːk]) is a khwaeng (sub-district) of Phasi Charoen District, Bangkok's Thonburi side. The subdistrict contained seven administrative villages.

== History and etymology ==
It is named after Khlong Bang Chak that runs through the area. It is a tributary of Khlong Bang Luang, also known as Khlong Bangkok Yai, on the southward of Khlong Bang Chueak Nang.

The name Bang Chak means "place of nipa palms", because there used to be this species of plants in this area. It was mentioned in Kamsuan Samut or Kamsuan Siprat, an ancient literature written in the early Ayutthaya period alike nearby areas Bang Ramat and Bang Chueak Nang of Taling Chan District.

== Geography ==
Bang Chak can be considered as the eastern part of the district, with total area of 1.50 km^{2} (0.57 mi^{2}).

Neighboring subdistricts are (from the north clockwise): Bang Waek, Khuha Sawan, Pak Khlong Phasi Charoen, Bang Wa, and Bang Duan.

Khlong Bang Chak and Khlong Bang Phlia are the local main watercourses.

The local temples Wat Kamphaeng Bang Chak and Wat Pradu Bang Chak, indeed, they are situated in Pak Khlong Phasi Charoen Sub-district. Another temple Wat Yang Bang Chak is situated in the area of Kukha Sawan Sub-district.

== Population ==
In January 2016, it had a total population of 8,221 people (3,804 men, 4,417 women) in 3,565 households.

== Transportation ==
- Ratchaphruek Road
