= Wat Kamphaeng Bang Chak =

- Wat Kamphaeng
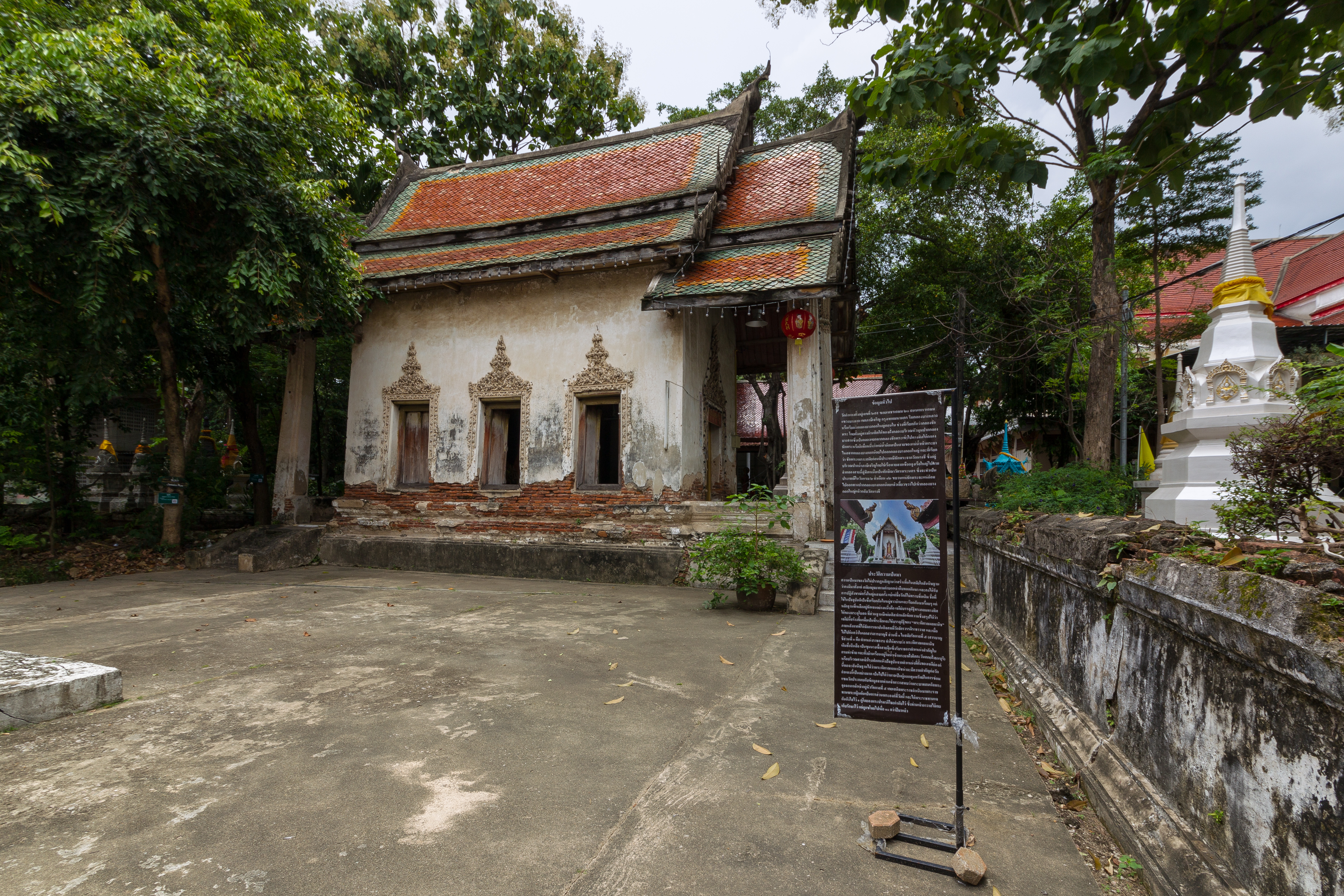
- Beside the ordination hall

- Location within Bangkok

Religion
- Affiliation: Buddhism
- Sect: Theravāda
- Status: private temple

Location
- Location: 299, Soi Phet Kasem 20, Phet Kasem Rd, Pak Khlong Phasi Charoen, Phasi Charoen, Bangkok
- Country: Thailand
- Interactive map of Wat Kamphaeng Bang Chak
- Coordinates: 13.730594°N 100.4632°E

Architecture
- Founder: Unknown

Wat Kamphaeng Bang Chak (Thai: วัดกำแพงบางจาก, pronounced [wát kām.pʰɛ̄ːŋ bāːŋ t͡ɕàːk]) is an ancient Thai Buddhist temple in Mahā Nikāya sect in Thonburi side (west side of Chao Phraya River) of Bangkok, considered as one of the oldest and most dominant temples in Bangkok.

The temple is believed to have been built since the late Ayutthaya period without knowing the exact history. But believe that many major renovations have been made especially during the reigns of King Rama III and Rama V.

The mural inside the ordination hall depicts the story of Mahanipata Jataka (10 previous lives of the Lord Buddha). Principal Buddha image in Māravijaya posture named Luang Pho Butsarakham enshrined inside, the overall appearance of the ordination hall is an art in the late Ayutthaya period. But the materials that decorate various parts was influenced by Chinese architectural style, which is a popular pattern in the reign of King Rama III.

Wat Kamphaeng Bang Chak has a total of seven chedi yo mum mai sip song (twelve indented corners chedi). The first one is on the south of the ordination hall, the base of the chedi outside is always located along the temple wall. While the other is currently in the area of the Baan Sinlapin (The Artist's House). Both chedis are about 10 meters (32 feet) high and they are now disintegrated over time.

It is a small temple that is known for its perfectly laid out layout and still maintains the original condition of the entire architecture and the murals were preserved almost completely.

Wat Kamphaeng Bang Chak is located by inner Khlong Bangkok Yai, also known as Khlong Bang Luang, where it is referred to as Khlong Chak Phra. It is located south of Khlong Bang Chak, at the corner of the mouth of the canal. Khlong Bang Chak is a waterway separated from Khlong Bangkok Yai to the west.

The temple also located behind the Baan Sinlapin, also known as The Artist's House, a centuries-old wooden Thai house turned gallery, with local artwork, photography and puppet theater by Khlong Bangkok Yai.

== Gallery ==
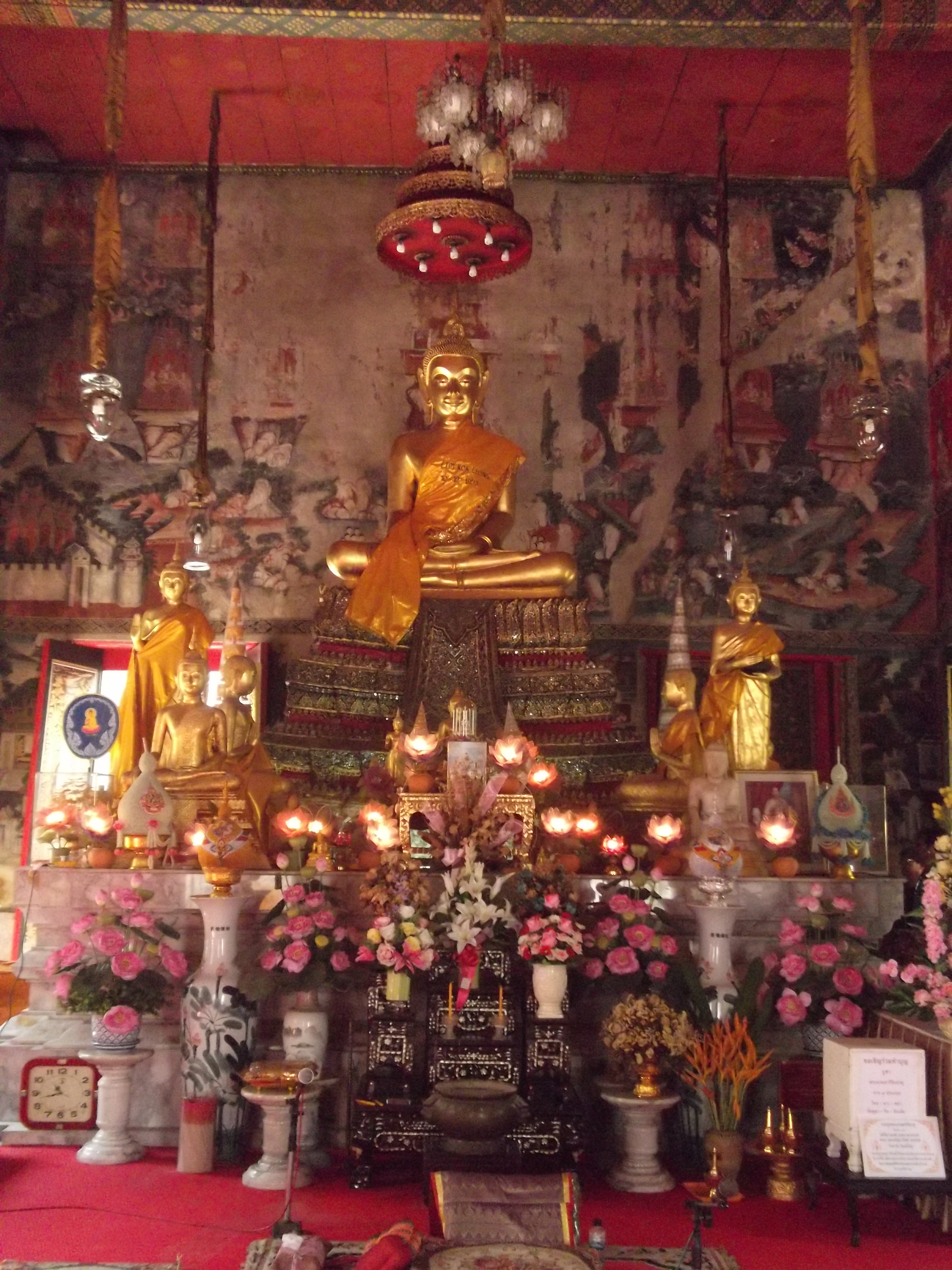
Luang Pho Butsarakham

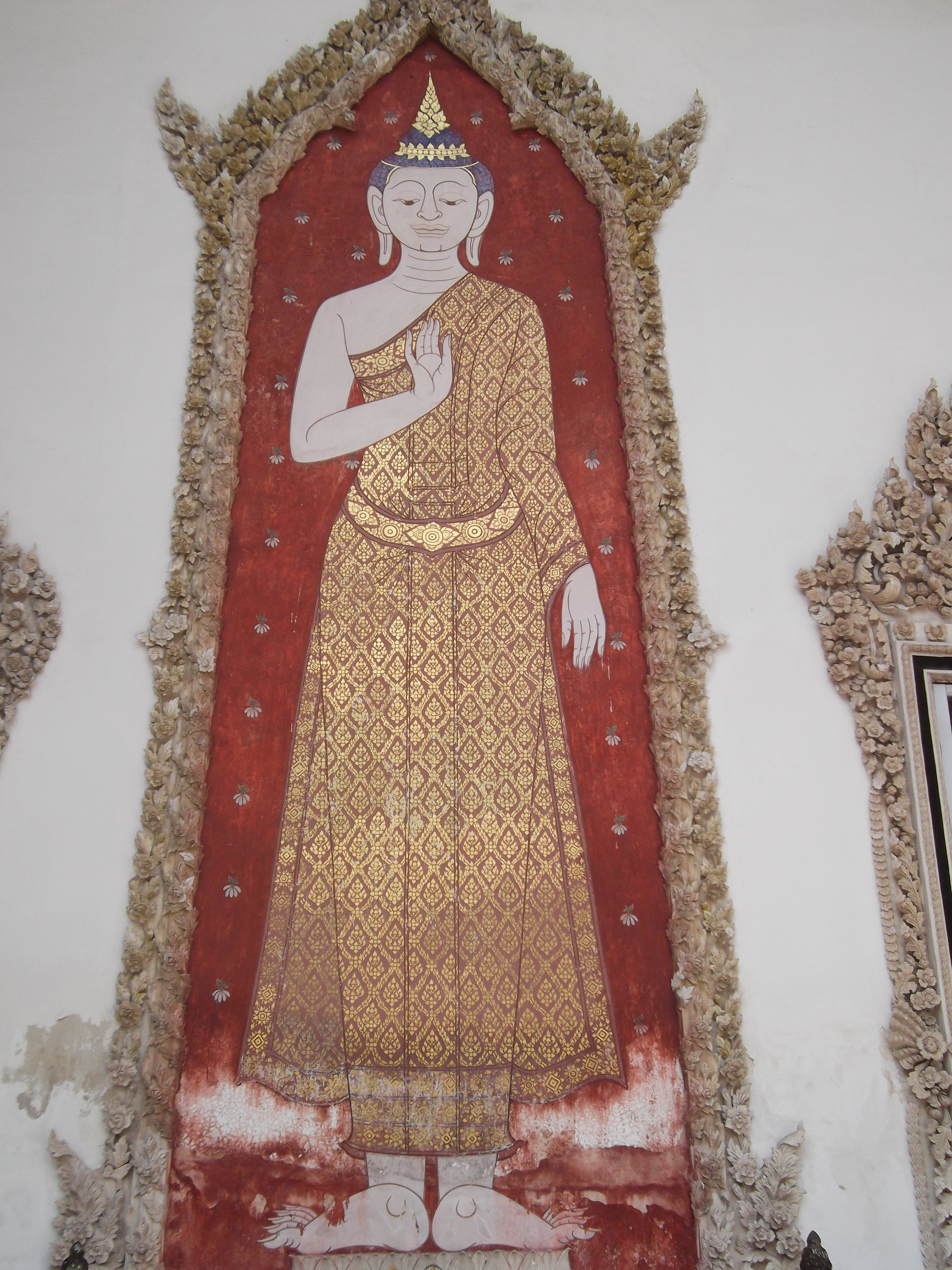
A striking painting of Lord Buddha in front of the ordination hall door
