= Bang Duan, Bangkok =

Bang Duan บางด้วน
- Khwaeng
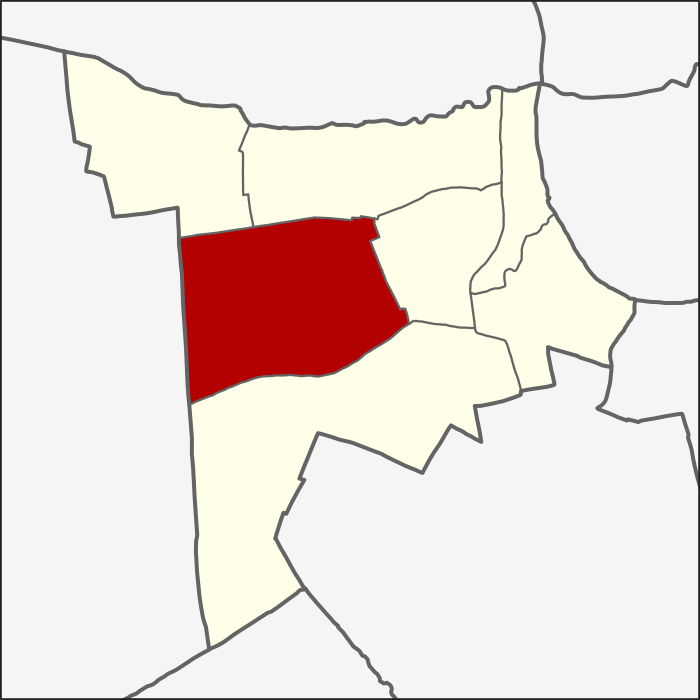
- Location in Phasi Charoen District
- Country: Thailand
- Province: Bangkok
- Khet: Phasi Charoen

Area
  - Total: 2.514 km^{2} (0.971 sq mi)

Population (2020)
  - Total: 28,156
- Time zone: UTC+7 (ICT)
- Postal code: 10160
- TIS 1099: 102202

Bang Duan (Thai: บางด้วน, pronounced [bāːŋ dûa̯n]) is a khwaeng (subdistrict) of Phasi Charoen District, in Bangkok, Thailand. In 2020, it had a total population of 28,156 people.

Its name "Bang Duan" is derived from the khlong Bang Duan, a canal runs through the area.

Lert Suksom Community is a small community under the bridge over the Khlong Bang Khi Keng on Phutthamonthon Sai 1 Road. As a result of the construction of Phutthamonthon Sai 1 Road in 1997 through here, this community was also affected. The area around the community has become a wasteland and a dumping ground. Later in 2012, the community on both sides of the road joined with Siam University, turning the wasteland under the bridge into a vegetable garden plot. The dominant species is pandan.

It is also a very prominent community in terms of waste management, until receiving an award from BMA and considered as a model of their own community development of other communities.
