= Wat Nang Chi Chotikaram =

Buddhist temple in Bangkok, Thailand

Coordinates: 13°43′00″N 100°28′05″E

- วัดนางชีโชติการาม
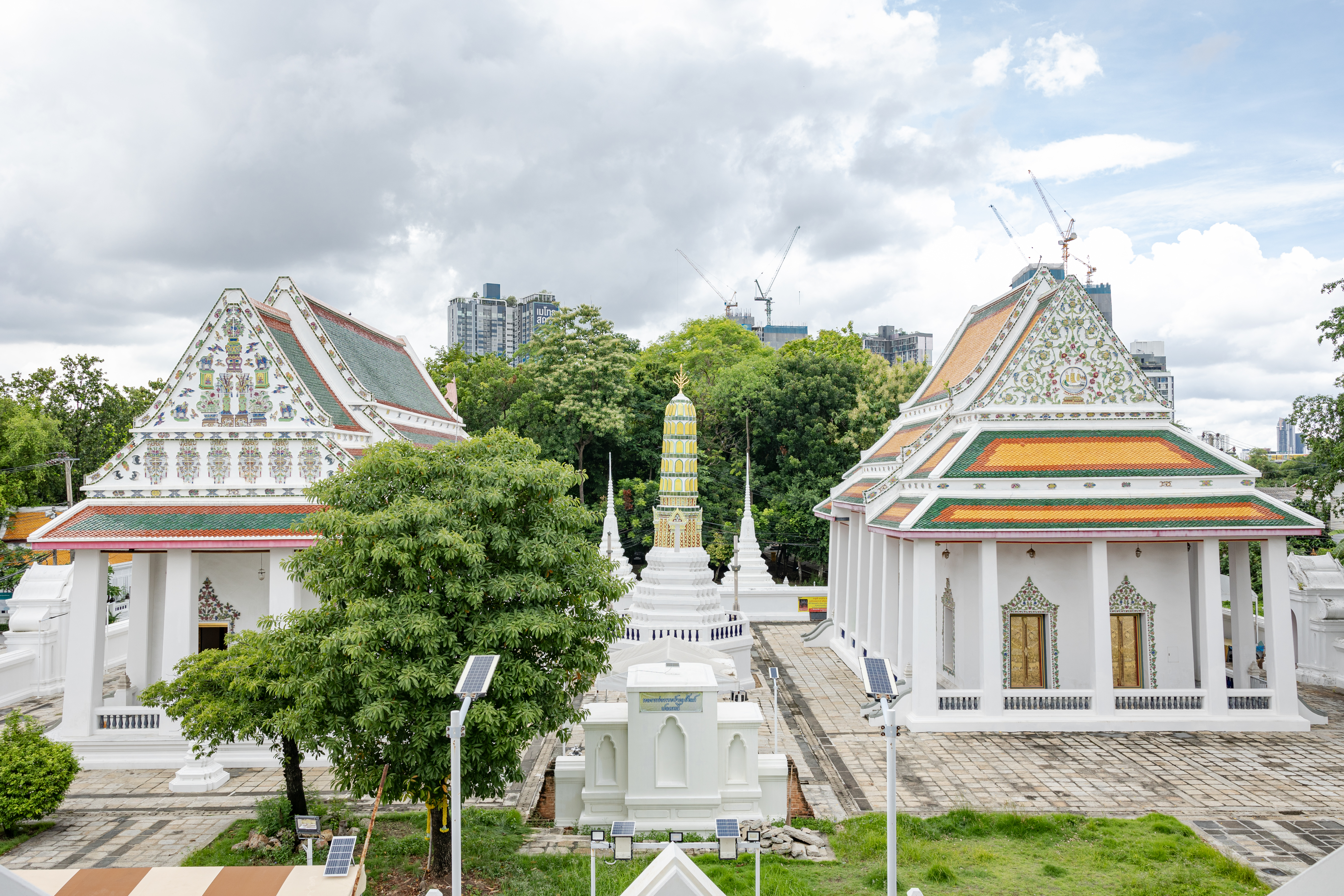
- Front of ordination hall and vihara

- Location within Thailand

Religion
- Affiliation: Buddhism

Location
- Location: 312 Soi Thoet Thai 41/1, Pak Khlong Phasi Charoen Subdistrict, Phasi Charoen District, Bangkok
- Country: Thailand
- Interactive map of Wat Nang Chi Chotikaram

Wat Nang Chi Chotikaram (Thai: วัดนางชีโชติการาม) or Wat Nang Chi Worawihan (วัดนางชีวรวิหาร), simply known as Wat Nang Chai (วัดนางชี) is a Thai Buddhist third-class royal temple in Bangkok.

== History ==
Wat Nang Chi dated back to middle Ayutthaya period, its name refers to "votaress temple". Because it is said that it was created from one nobleman who had a daughter who had just recovered from the disease, she therefore ordained by make a votive offering. Her father therefore built this temple to offer as a Buddhist altar. Later on at the time of the late Ayutthaya period, the temple was abandoned.

In the reigns of King Rama I and King Rama III of early Rattanakosin period, the temple was restored and rebuilt in some parts with Chinese architecture which was popular during that time. That is way this temple has no gable apex on the roof of the ordination hall like other temples.

Although it is only a small and quiet temple today but there is something interesting that is the place where Buddha's relics are enshrined without being placed in pagoda like other temples.

== Location ==
Wat Nang Chi located at the shore of Khlong Dan canal, Soi Thoet Thai 41/1, Pak Khlong Phasi Charoen Subdistrict, Phasi Charoen District, Bangkok's Thonburi side.

The temple and including nearby canals was used as the location for filming The Man with the Golden Gun in 1974, in the boat chase scene.

== Local tradition ==
The temple has an annual religion tradition called "Chak Phra", is to invite the Buddha's relics onto a barge decorated with beautiful flowers. Then the barge procession will sail from Khlong Dan turn left into Khlong Bangkok Yai, and enter Khlong Bangkok Noi pass Wat Kai Tia at Khlong Chak Phra before ending at Taling Chan District Office and back on the same day, after the monks had finished lunch together from the merit making of Buddhists by passing through Chao Phraya River and entering the various canals before returning to Wat Nang Chi as usual.

The tradition is held annually on the 2nd day of the waning moon of the 12th Thai lunar month, but today has extended the event to three days to allow people to pay more respect to the Buddha's relics. It is a tradition that treats every year for over 200 years since the early Rattanakosin period and regarded as the only Chak Phra that has occurred in Bangkok.
