= Bang Wa station =

Railway station in Bangkok, Thailand

Bang Wa บางหว้า

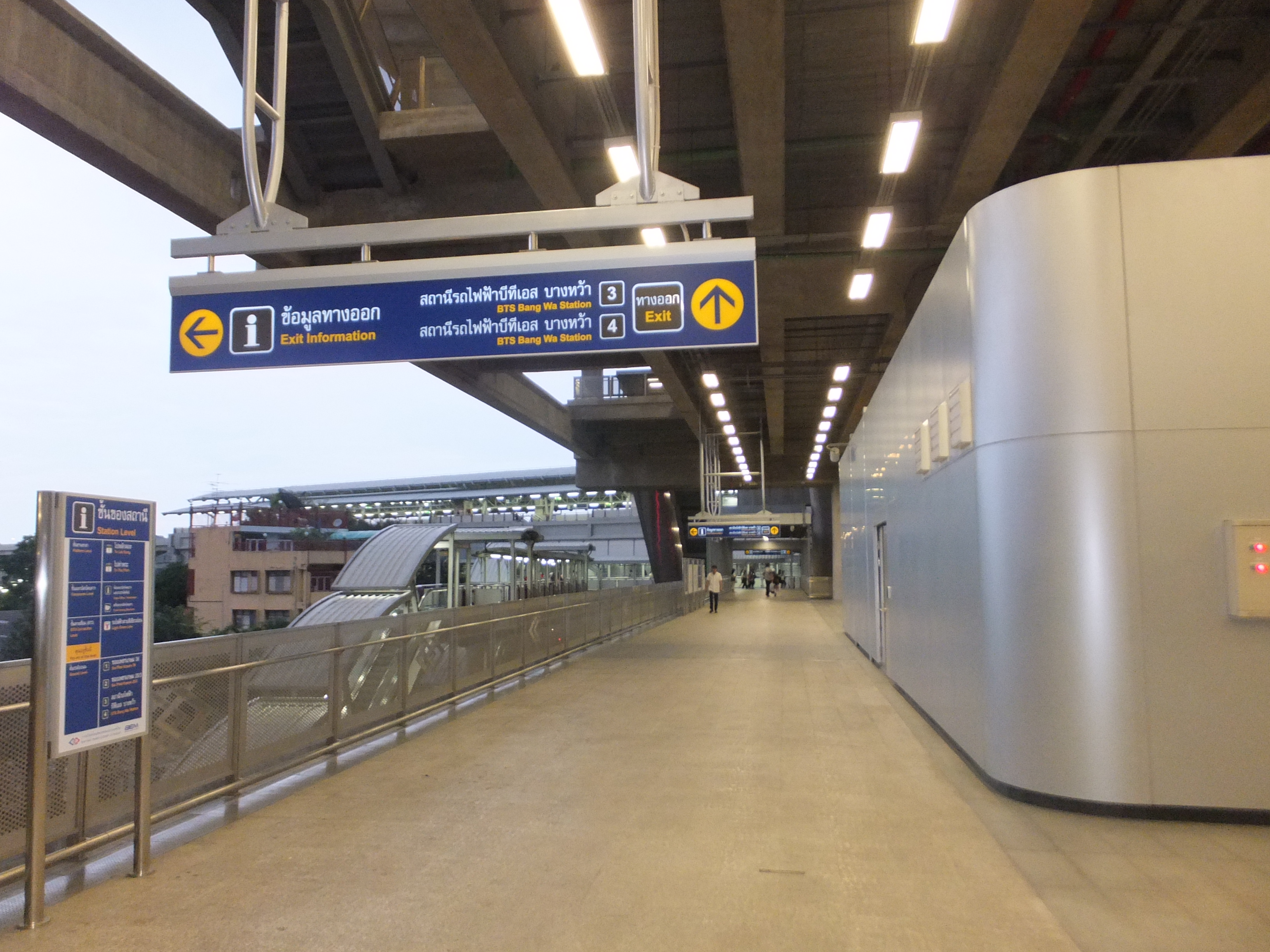
- Mezzanine of MRT station with BTS station in the background

General information
- Location: Phasi Charoen; Bangkok; Thailand
- Coordinates: 13°43′14.25″N 100°27′28.33″E
- System: BTS MRT
- Owner: Bangkok Metropolitan Administration (BMA) (BTS SkyTrain); Mass Rapid Transit Authority of Thailand (MRTA) (MRT Blue Line)
- Operator: Bangkok Mass Transit System Public Company Limited (BTSC) (BTS SkyTrain); Bangkok Expressway and Metro Public Company Limited (BEM) (MRT Blue Line)
- Lines: Silom Line; Blue Line
- Connections: Khlong Phasi Charoen boat service (Bang Wa pier)

Other information
- Station code: Silom line: S12; MRT Blue Line: BL34

History
- Opened: 5 December 2013; 12 years ago (BTS Skytrain); 24 August 2019; 6 years ago (MRT Blue Line)

Passengers
- 2021: 2,463,019 (BTS); 2,481,924 (MRT)

Services
Preceding station	BTS Skytrain	Following station
Wutthakat towards National Stadium	Silom Line	Terminus
Preceding station	Metropolitan Rapid Transit	Following station
Phetkasem 48 towards Lak Song	Blue Line	Bang Phai towards Tha Phra
Location

Bang Wa station (Thai: สถานีบางหว้า, pronounced [sā.tʰǎː.nīː bāːŋ wâː]) is a rapid transit station on the BTS Silom Line and MRT Blue Line in Pak Khlong Phasi Charoen Subdistrict, Phasi Charoen District, Bangkok, Thailand. The station is on the Phet Kasem Interchange where Ratchaphruek cuts with Phet Kasem Roads. It serves as an interchange station for BTS Silom Line and MRT Blue Line, providing direct interchange, but with separate fare and ticket systems for the two lines. Out of the interchanges between the MRT and Skytrain, Bang Wa was the only station where both systems share the same name for the station, as the other interchange stations on the BTS Skytrain (Asok, Sala Daeng, Mo Chit, and Ha Yaek Lat Phrao) all have separate names with their MRT counterparts (Sukhumvit, Si Lom, Chatuchak Park, and Phahon Yothin stations). This is no longer true after the opening of the MRT Yellow Line's station at Samrong.

== History ==
Bang Wa station opened on 5 December 2013, the same day as the opening of Wutthakat station. Initially, it was only served by Silom Line, and is the terminal station for the Silom Line.

In March 2018, a skywalk was completed connecting the station to Bang Wa Pier of the Khlong Phasi Charoen boat service.

The MRT section of the station opened on 24 August 2019 as part of the Blue Line extension.

== Station layout ==
U4; Platform (MRT)	Side platform, doors will open on the left
U4; Platform (MRT)	Platform 1	MRT toward Lak Song (Phetkasem 48)
U4; Platform (MRT)	Platform 2	MRT toward Tha Phra (Bang Phai)
U4; Platform (MRT)	Side platform, doors will open on the left
U3; Platform (BTS); Concourse (MRT)	MRT ticket sales floor	MRT Exits 1–5, Passenger Service Center; Ticket Office, Ticket Machines, Faregates, Shops
U3; Platform (BTS); Concourse (MRT)	Side platform, doors will open on the left
U3; Platform (BTS); Concourse (MRT)	Platform 4	Silom Line toward National Stadium (Wutthakat)
U3; Platform (BTS); Concourse (MRT)	Platform 3	Silom Line termination platform
U3; Platform (BTS); Concourse (MRT)	Side platform, doors will open on the left
U2; Concourse (BTS)	BTS ticket sales floor	BTS Exits 1–5, Passenger Service Center; Ticket Office, Ticket Machines, Faregates, Shops
G Street level	-	Bus Stop; Bang Wa Pier, Bank for Agriculture and Agricultural Cooperatives

== Gallery ==
=== BTS Station ===
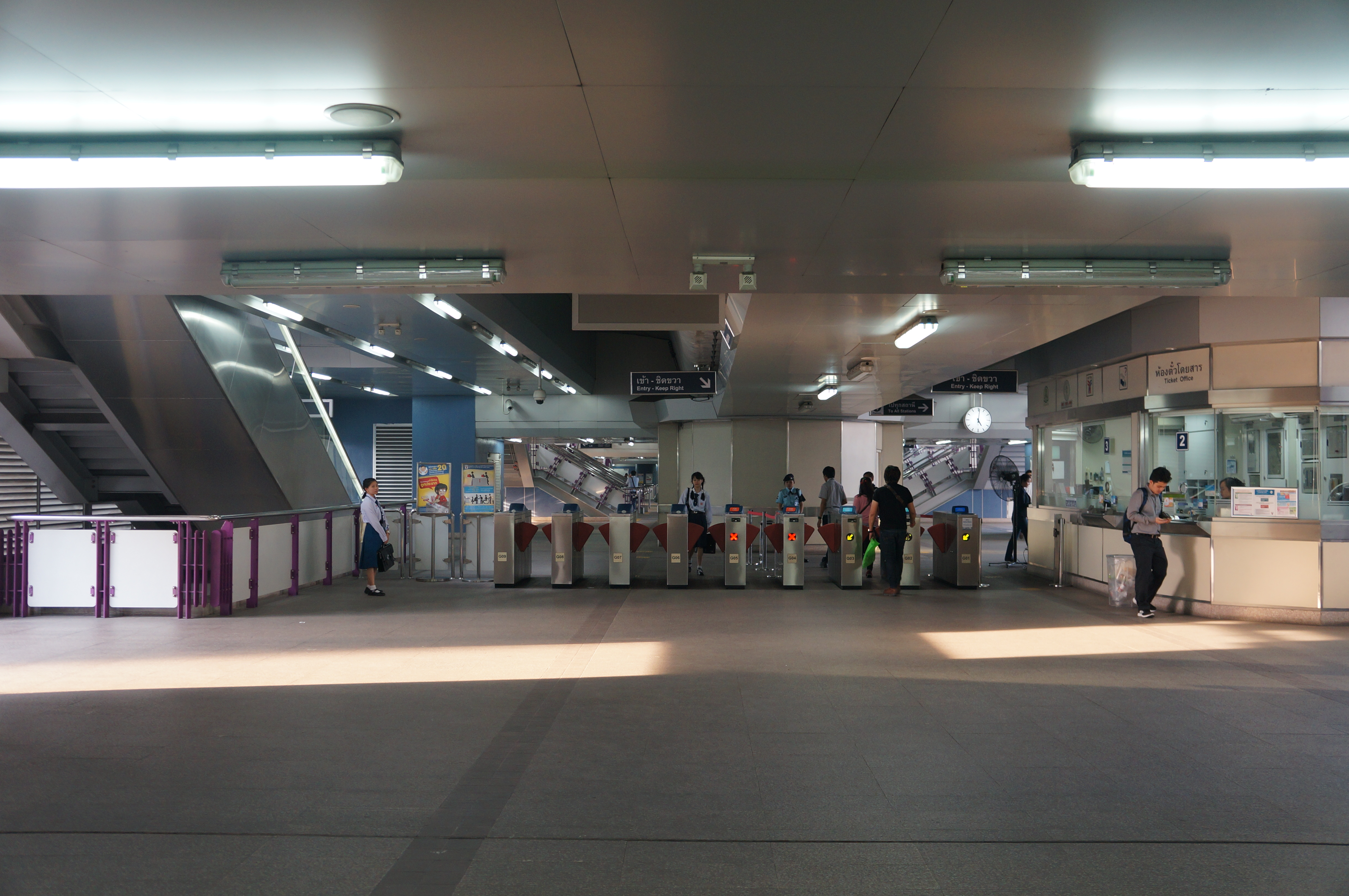
Ticket Hall of BTS Silom Line

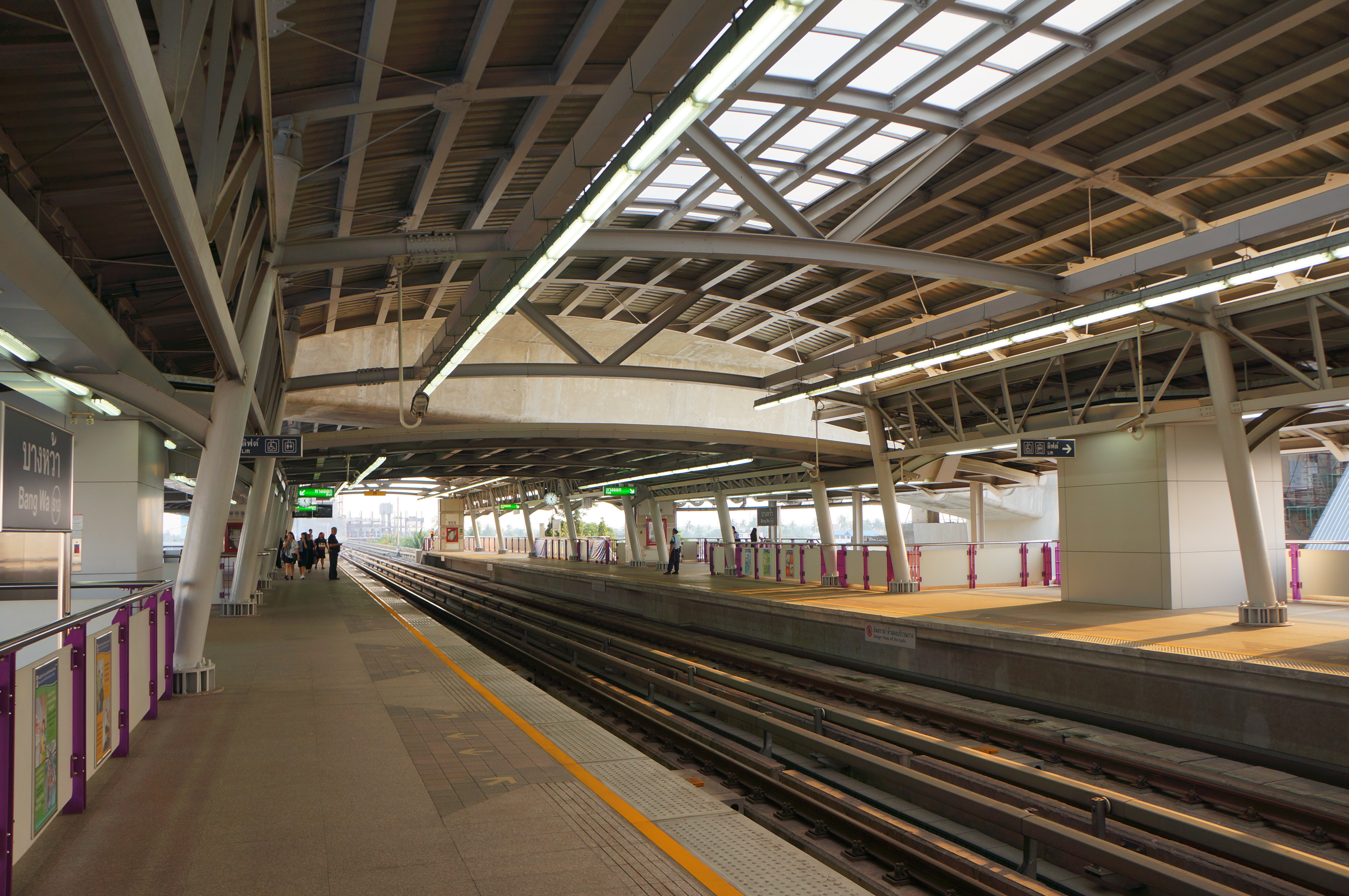
Silom Line platform

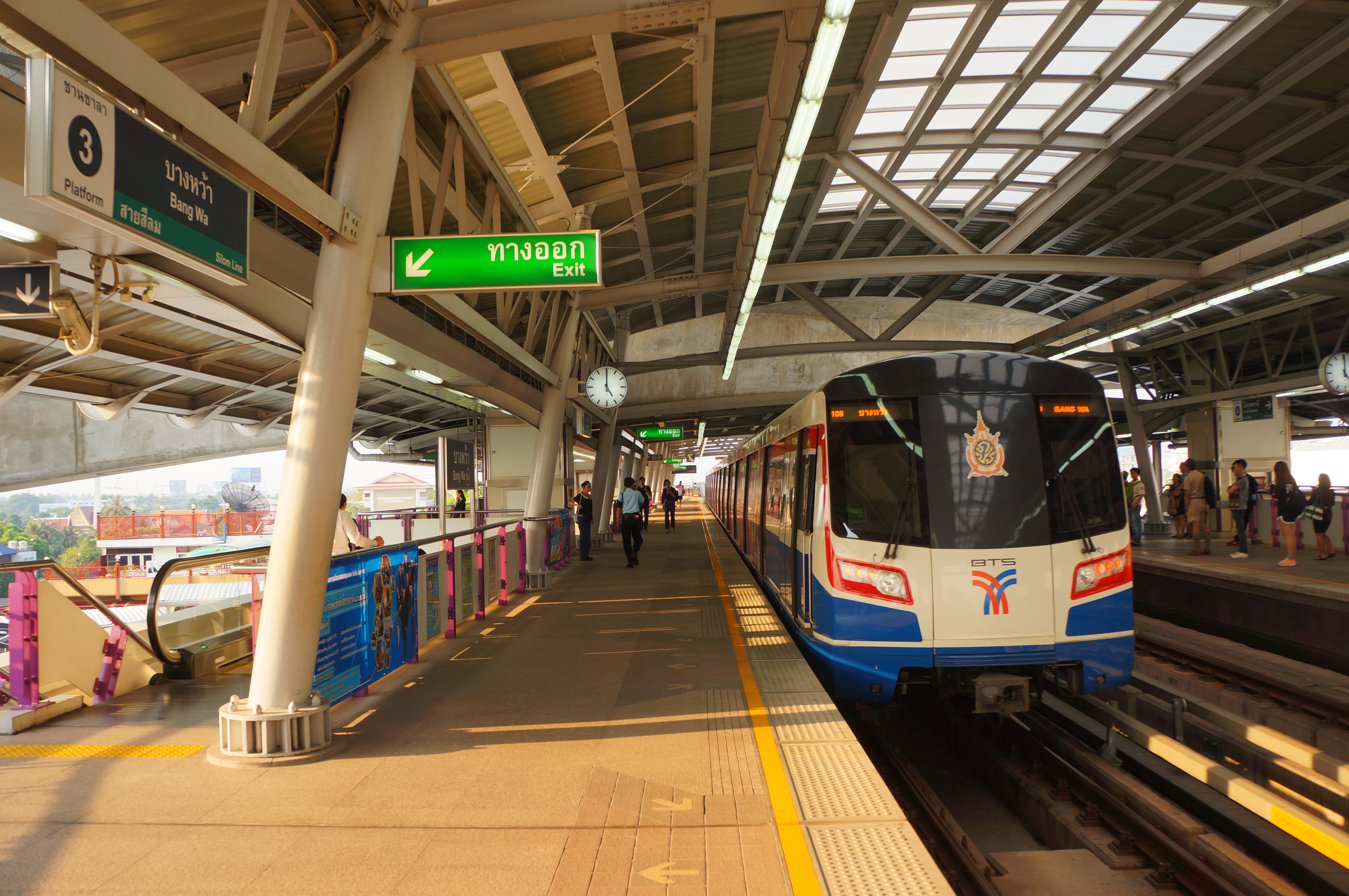
Silom Line Platform

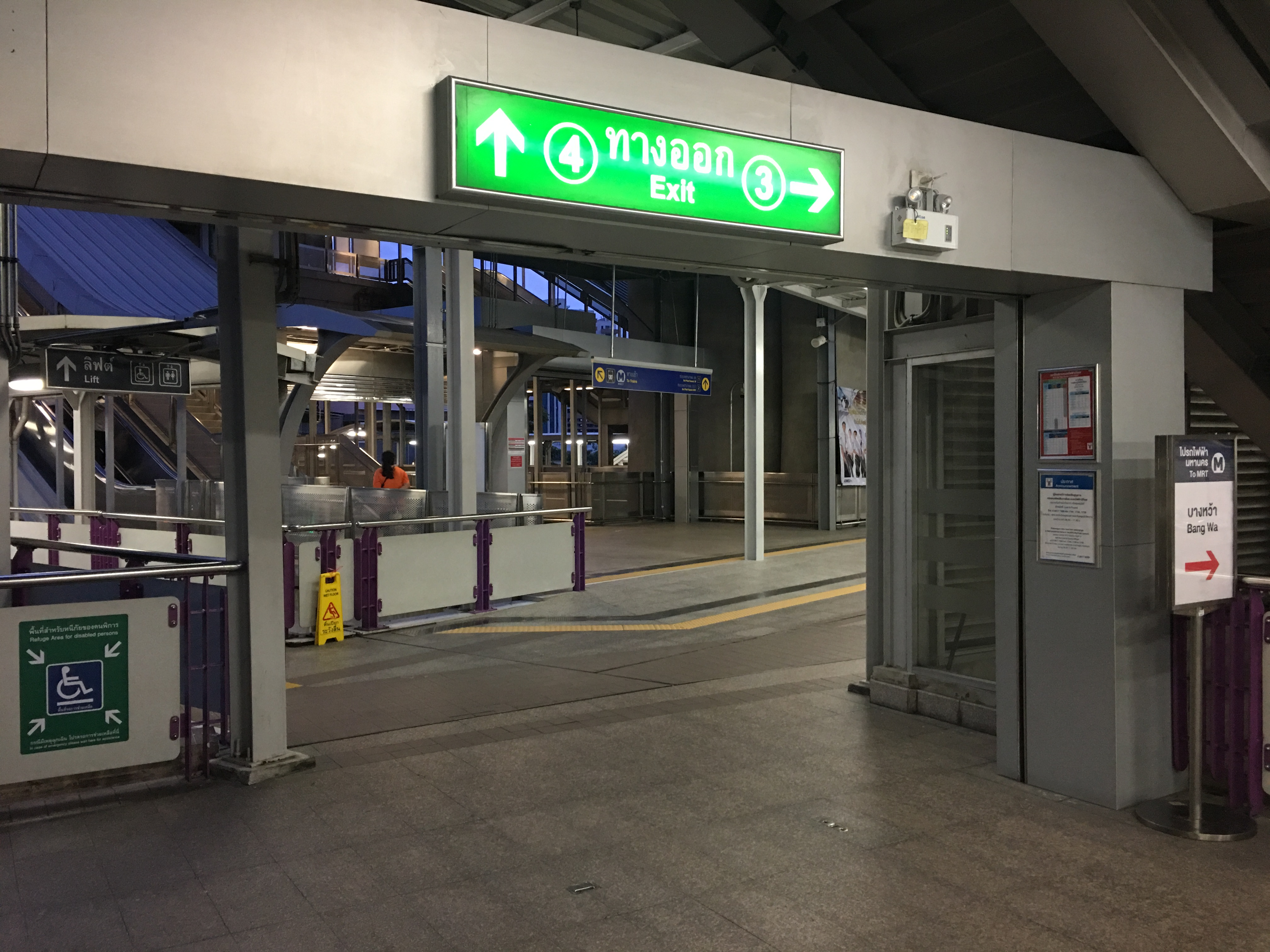
Transfer hall

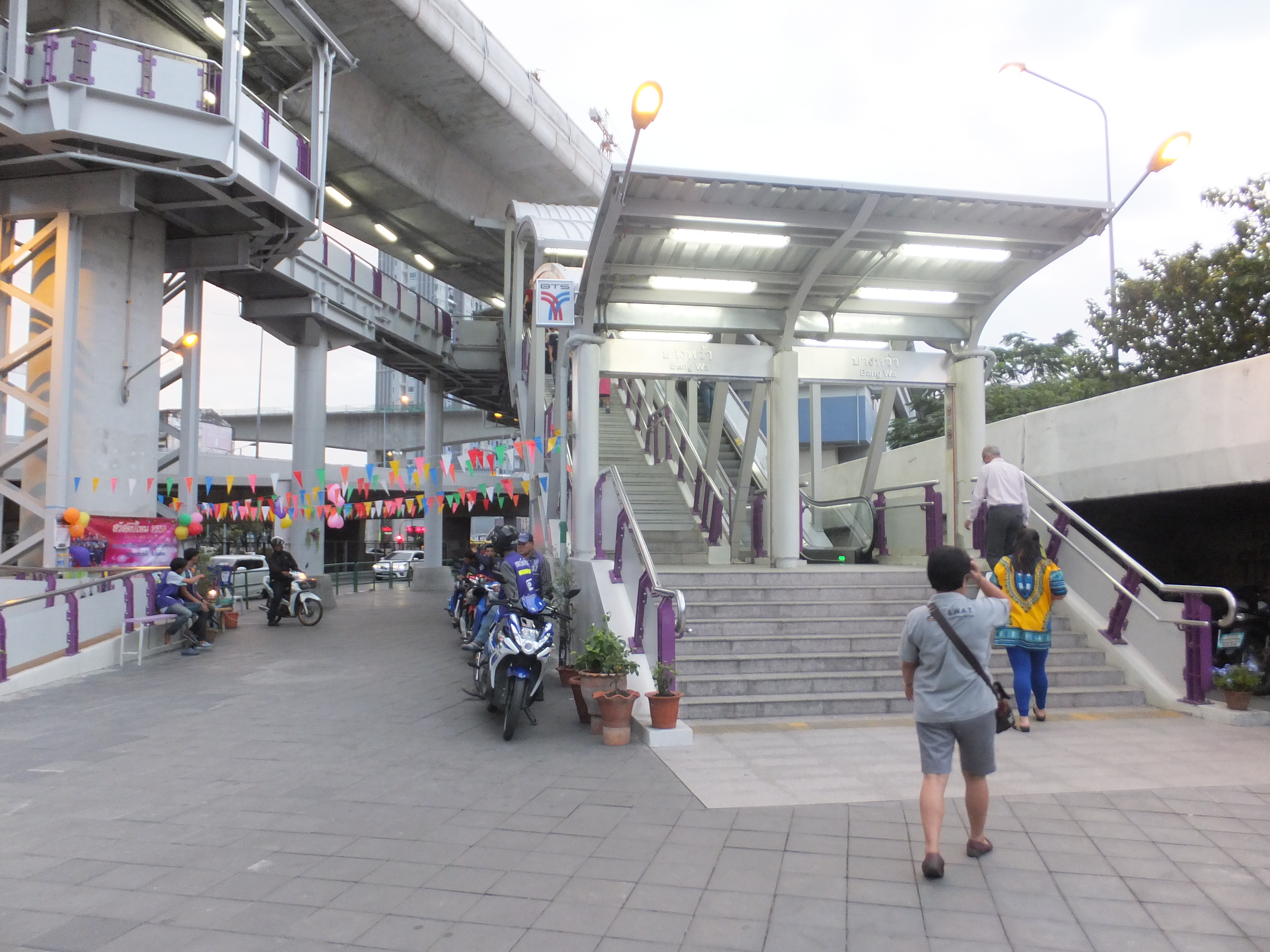
Station entrance

Bang Wa station sign before the opening of MRT

Bang Wa station sign (BTS) after the opening of MRT

=== MRT Station ===
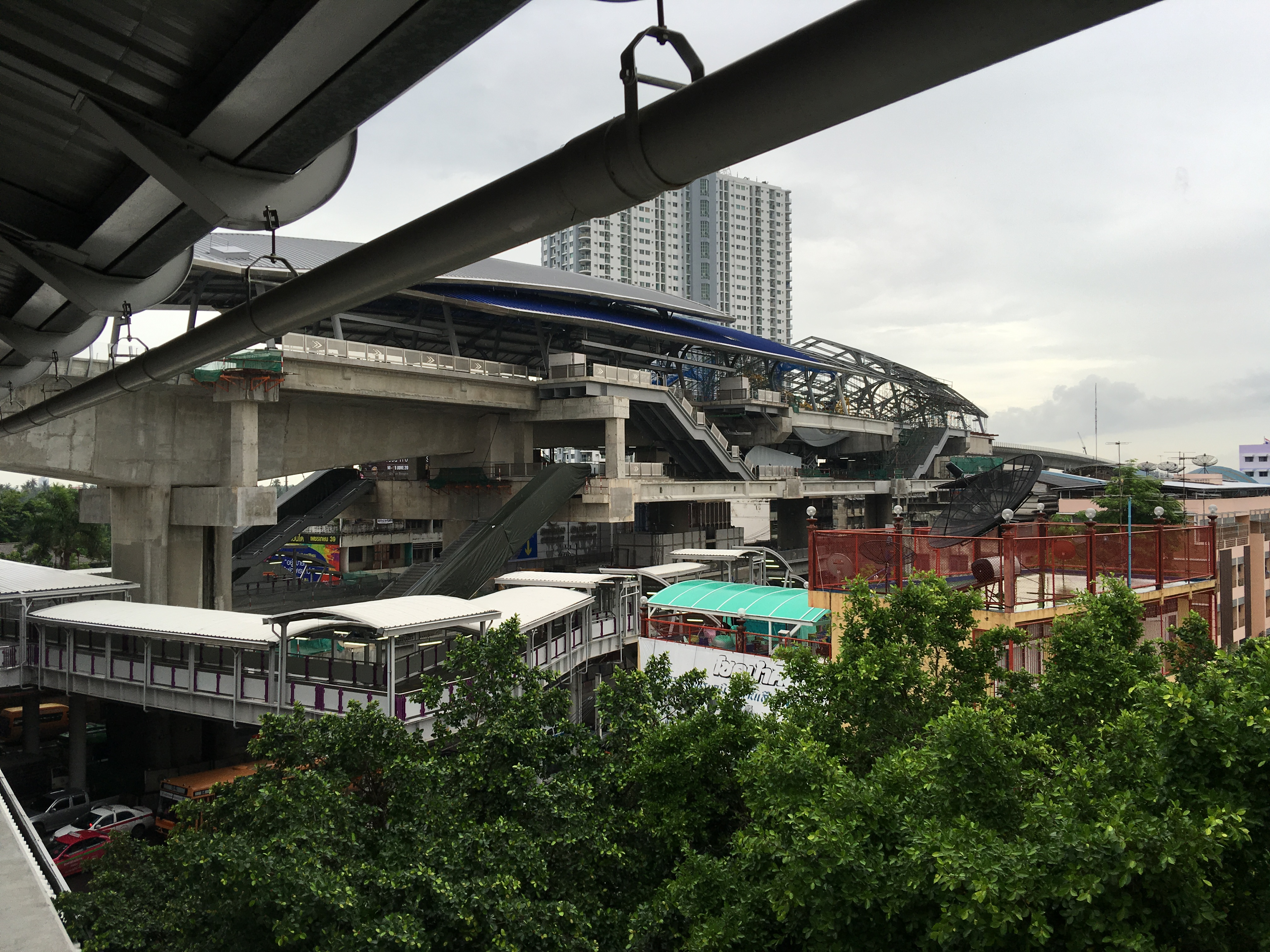
MRT station under construction (Photo taken from BTS platform)

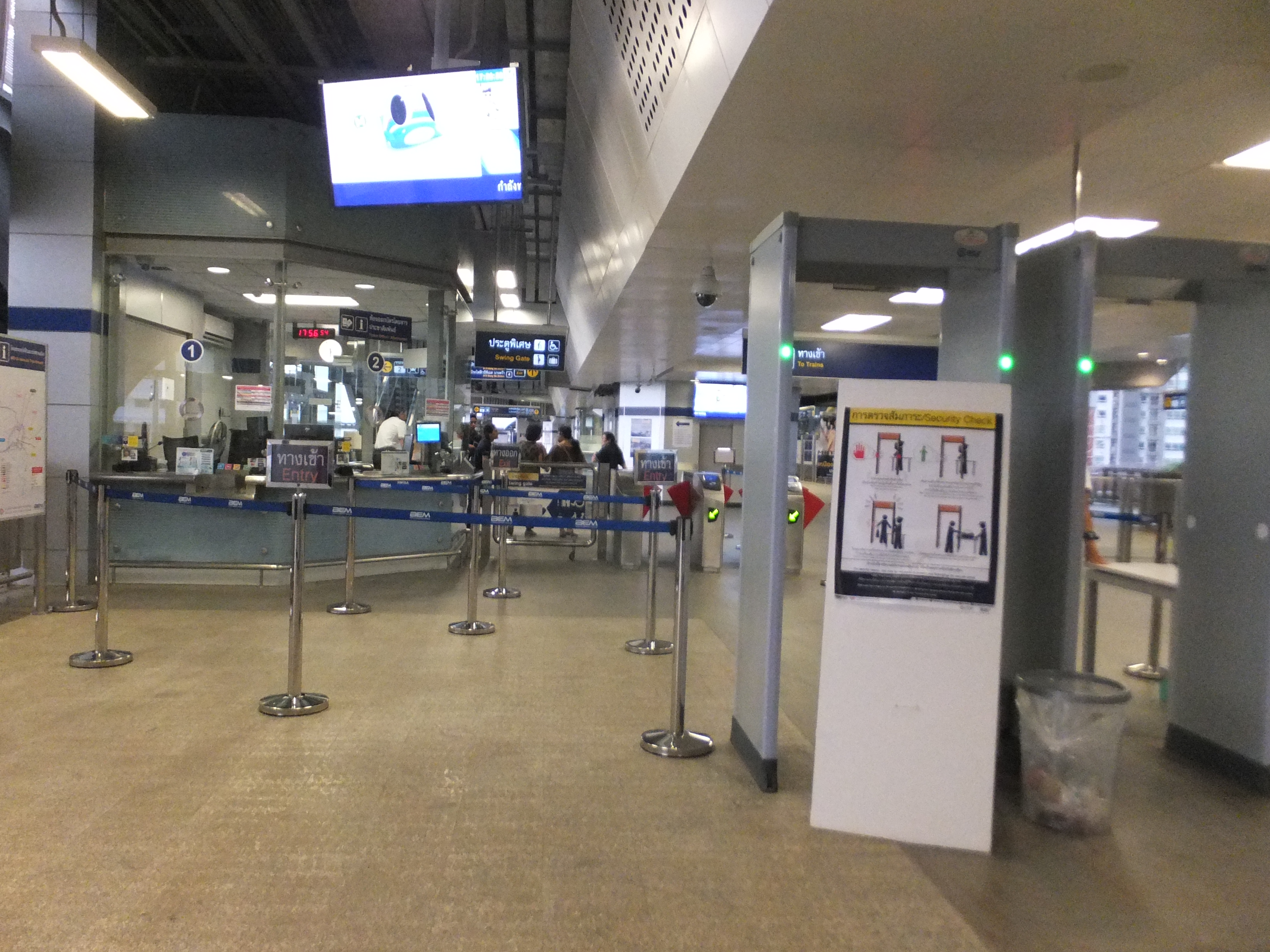
Ticket Hall of MRT Blue Line

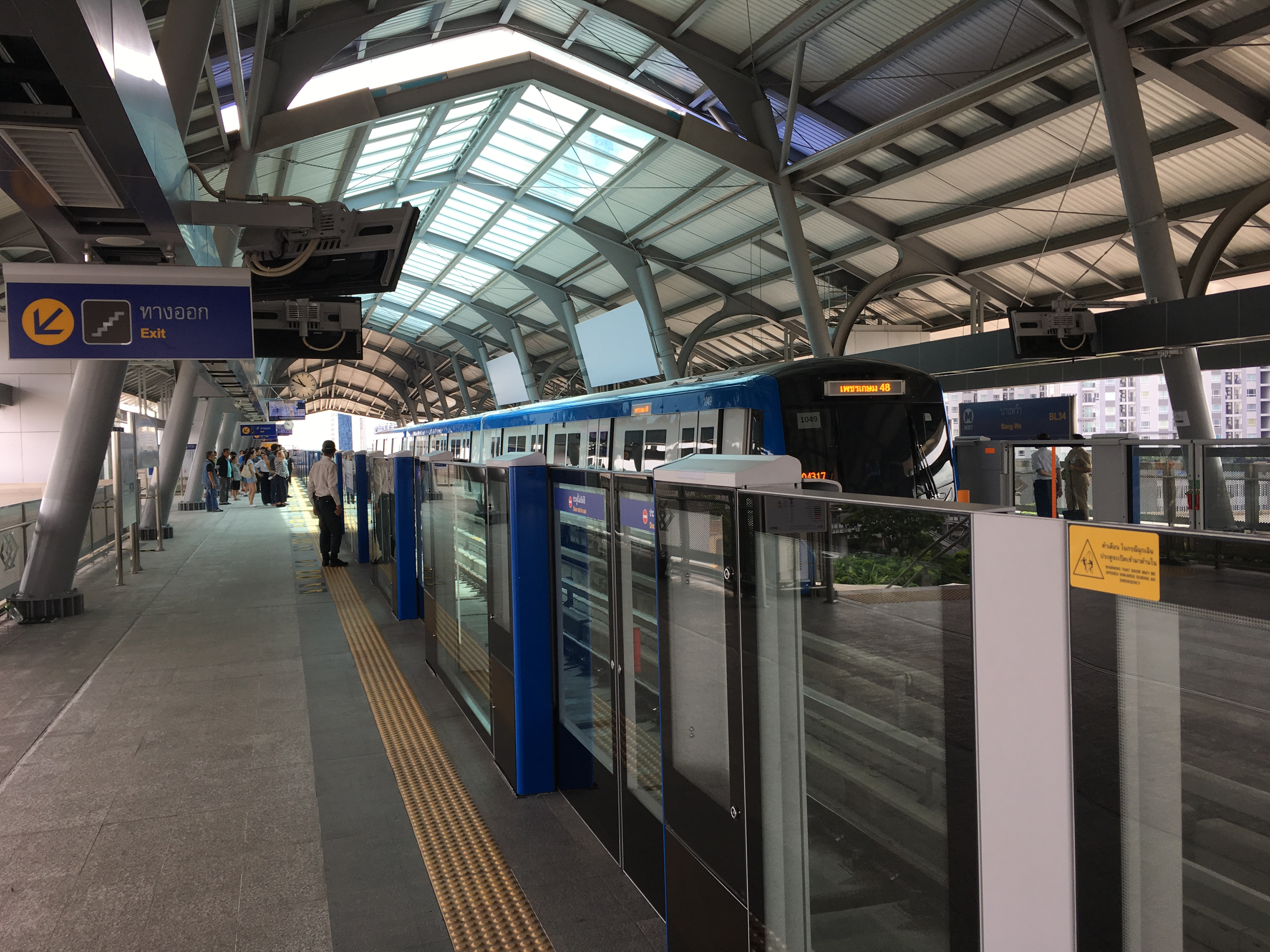
Blue Line Platform

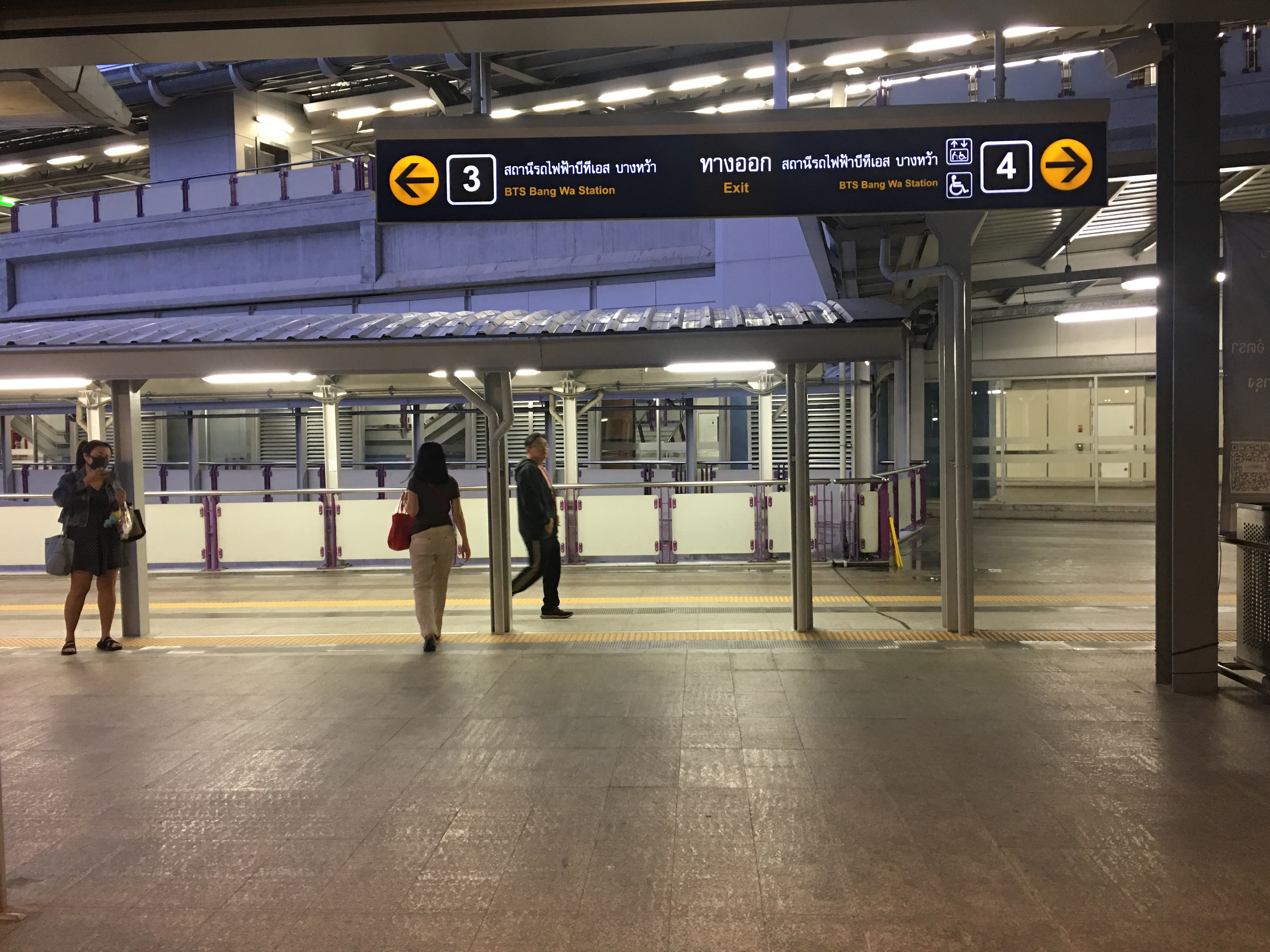
Transfer hall

Bang Wa station sign (MRT)

== See also ==
- Bangkok Skytrain
- MRT (Bangkok)
