= Bang Waek =

Subdistrict in Bangkok, Thailand

Coordinates: 13°44′03.4″N 100°26′28.2″E

Bang Waek บางแวก
- Khwaeng
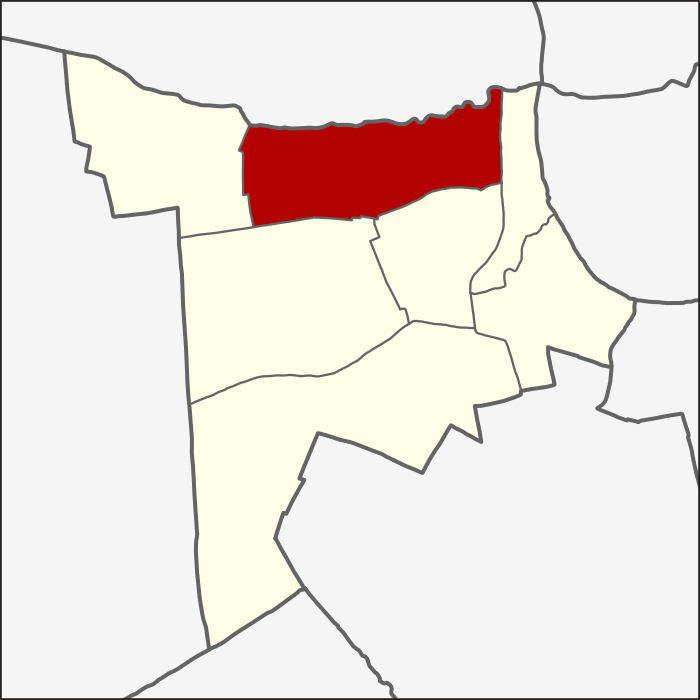
- Location in Phasi Charoen District
- Country: Thailand
- Province: Bangkok
- Khet: Phasi Charoen

Area
  - Total: 3.022 km^{2} (1.167 sq mi)

Population (2020)
  - Total: 18,757
- Time zone: UTC+7 (ICT)
- Postal code: 10160
- TIS 1099: 102207

Bang Waek (Thai: บางแวก, pronounced [bāːŋ wɛ̂ːk]) is a khwaeng (sub-district) of Phasi Charoen District, Bangkok's Thonburi side. The subdistrict contains 11 administrative villages.

== History ==
It is named after Khlong Bang Waek, that runs through the area. It is a tributary of Khlong Chak Phra and flows into the Khlong Bangkok Noi.

In the early Rattanakosin period, Khlong Bang Waek and its basin considered as the tip of betel large market Talat Phlu, which is in Thon Buri District.

== Geography ==
Bang Waek can be considered as a northern part of the district, with total area of 2.29 km^{2} (0.88 mi^{2}).

Neighboring subdistricts are (from north clockwise): Bang Chueak Nang of Taling Chan District, Khuha Sawan, Bang Chak and Bang Duan with Khlong Khwang in the same district.

The prominent local temple Wat Bang Waek is in Khuha Sawan Sub-district.
