= Wat Nuannoradit =

Temple in Thailand

- วัดนวลนรดิศ
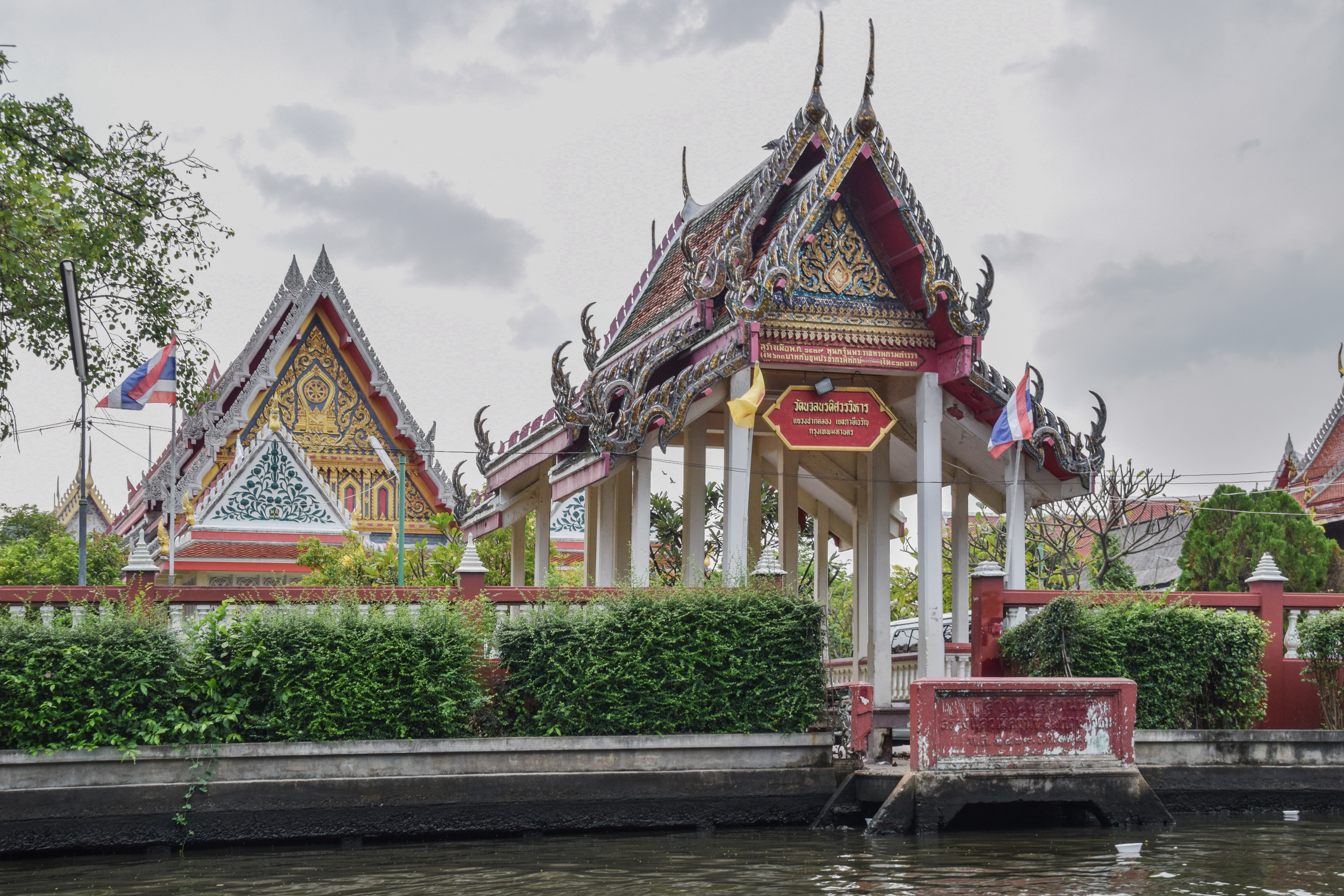

- Location within Bangkok

Religion
- Affiliation: Buddhism

Location
- Location: 102 Soi Nuan Nordit, Pak Khlong Phasi Charoen, Phasi Charoen, Bangkok
- Country: Thailand
- Interactive map of Wat Nuannoradit
- Coordinates: 13°43′31.1″N 100°27′58.2″E

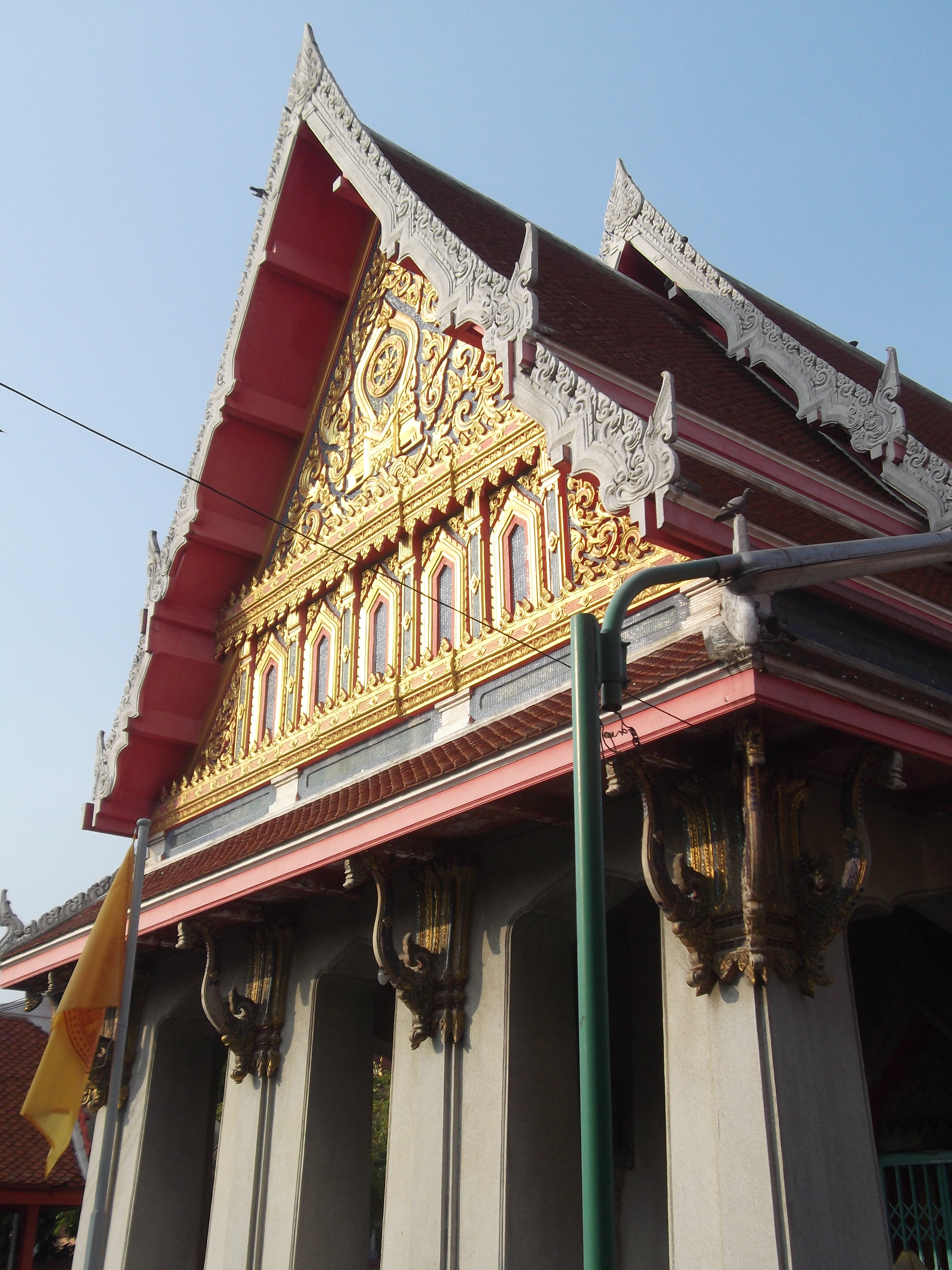
Abbey of Wat Nuannoradit

Wat Nuannoradit (Thai: วัดนวลนรดิศ) is the 3rd ranked temple in Thailand. It is on the western side of the Khlong Bangkok Yai (Bangkok Yai canal) and opposite Wat Praduchimplee and Wat Nuan Noradit School.

== History ==
Wat Nuannoradit is ancient and was deserted for a long time. Some people believe that it was built in the era of the Ayutthaya Kingdom. Its older name was Wat Makok Nai ("Inside Bangkok canal temple"), paired with Wat Makok Nok ("Outside Bangkok canal temple", now Wat Arun). At the end of the reign of Chao khun Phra Ratchaphan (Nuan), who was Chao Phraya Akkhamahasena (Bunnag)’s wife and the sister of Queen Amarindra, she repaired Wat Makok Nai, assigning responsibility to her son Chao Phraya Phra khlang (Dit Bunnag).

Jao Phraya Phraklan (Dit Bunnaak) repaired Wat Makok Nai after he finished repairing Wat Prayurawongsawat in 2379 of the Buddhist era (1836). After that King Chulalongkorn (King Rama V) changed its name to Wat Nuannoradit after Chao Khun Phraratchaphan (Nuan).

The temple was repaired once by Chao Phraya Surawongwaiwat (Worn Bunnaak) and Chao Phraya Passakorawong (Phon Bunnag) and again by Phra Sassananurak (Tim Rattanachoot). After that, it was maintained continuously.
