= Khlong Phasi Charoen =

Canal in Bangkok, Thailand

Coordinates: 13°38′N 100°14′E

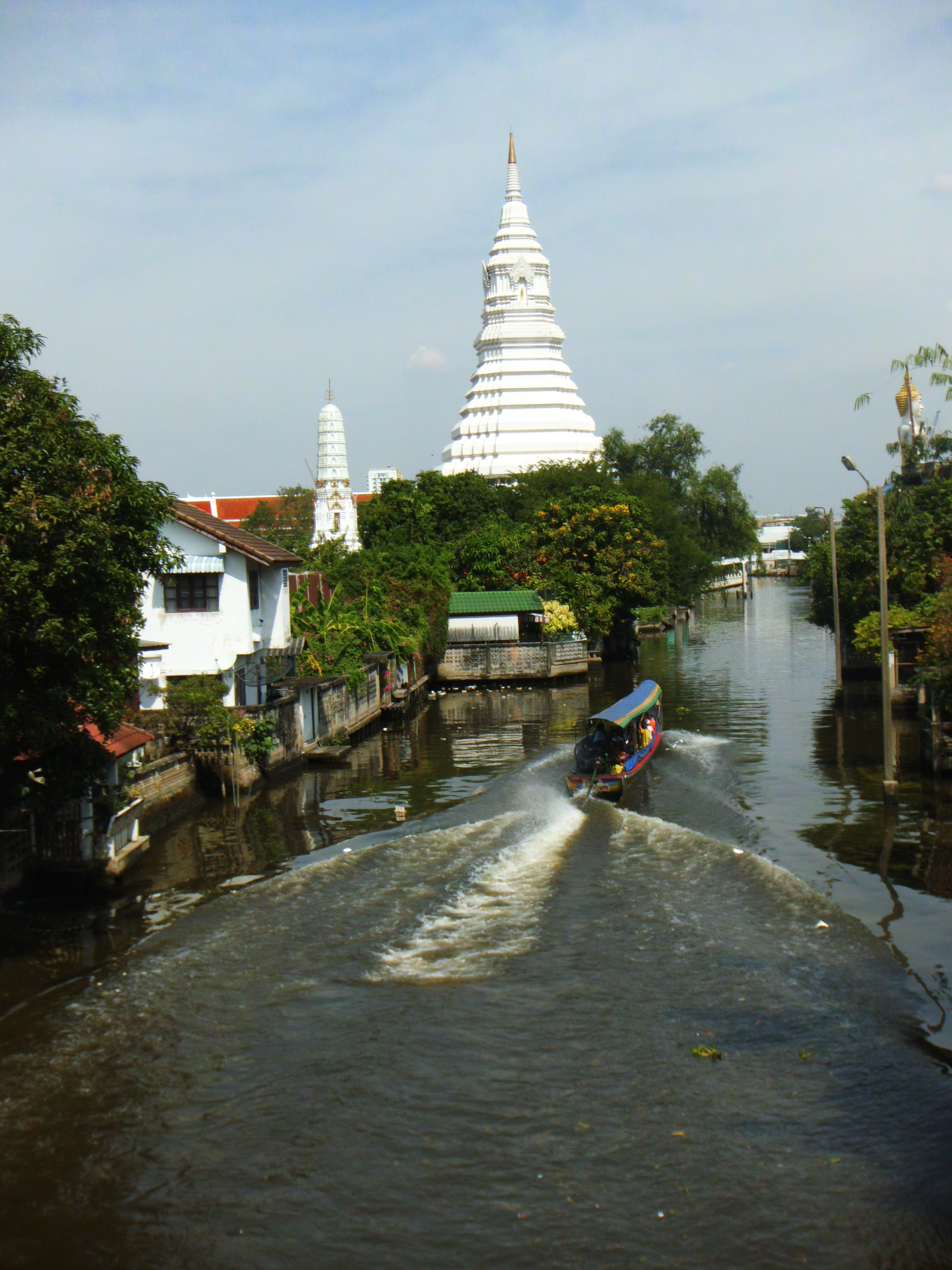
Khlong Phasi Charoen, January 2016, white pagoda of Wat Pak Nam Phasi Charoen

Khlong Phasi Charoen (Thai: คลองภาษีเจริญ, pronounced [kʰlɔ̄ːŋ pʰāː.sǐː t͡ɕā.rɤ̄ːn]) is a canal west of the Chao Phraya River in the Thonburi area of the Bangkok conurbation. The canal links the Tha Chin River to Khlong Bangkok Yai. It starts at Khlong Bangkok Yai near Wat Paknam Bhasicharoen, Bangkok and ends south of Wat Ang Thong, Tambon Don Kai Di, Krathum Baen District, Samut Sakhon Province. It is approximately 24 km (14.9 mi) long.

The canal project was initiated by Phra Phasi Sombat Boriboon (พระภาษีสมบัติบริบูรณ์), who later became Phraya Phison Sombat Boriboon (พระยาพิสณฑ์สมบัติบริบูรณ์). Originally Phasi Charoen proposed to fund the project in exchange for the right to collect tolls. It was approved by King Mongkut (Rama IV). Its 112,000 baht cost was financed via tax deductions from the amount Phra Phasi Sombat Boriboon collected, thus making the canal toll-free. Construction began in 1866 and was completed in 1872. Water flows were controlled by two advanced mechanical water gates, designed by a Dutch architect to use in transporting sugar.

The expansion of Khlong Phasi Charoen to reach the Tha Chin River, which is the route to the Gulf of Thailand, is due to the French blockade of Gulf of Thai estuary in 1893 (Paknam incident). King Chulalongkorn (Rama V) concerned about no passage to the sea during the blockade. He decided that the canal should be built to provide another area passage.

Khlong Phasi Charoen was the location used for filming the boat chase scene in The Man with the Golden Gun in 1974.

== See also ==
- Khlong Phasi Charoen boat service
