= Khlong Bangkok Yai =

Coordinates: 13°46′45.3″N 100°27′46.6″E

- Khlong Bangkok Yai in 2023, viewed from an angle that reveals the giant Buddha statue of Wat Paknam Bhasicharoen
- Interactive map of Khlong Bangkok Yai

Specifications
- Length: 6 km (3.7 miles)

Geography
- Start point: Bangkok
- End point: Bangkok
- Connects to: Chao Phraya River, Khlong Samre, Khlong Bang Sakae, Khlong Bang Luang Noi, Khlong Phasi Charoen, Khlong Dan, Khlong Bang Phlia, Khlong Bang Waek, Khlong Mon

Khlong Bangkok Yai (Thai: คลองบางกอกใหญ่, pronounced [kʰlɔ̄ːŋ bāːŋ.kɔ̀ːk jàj], lit. 'Big Bangkok Canal') is a historic khlong (lit. 'canal') of Bangkok. The canal has a total length of 6 km (about 3 mi) and connects with various waterways before terminating at its confluence with Khlong Mon, where it meets Khlong Chak Phra and Khlong Bang Chueak Nang. Along its course, the canal passes through three districts: Bangkok Yai, Thon Buri, and Phasi Charoen.

== History ==
The course of Khlong Bangkok Yai was originally a meandering part of the Chao Phraya River, which used to be longer than in the present day. Those who travel by boat must cruise along the river, which took more than one day. In the reign of King Chairachathirat (1534–46) of the Ayutthaya Kingdom, he ordered the construction of a canal bypassing a loop of the Chao Phraya River, known as Khlong Lat Bangkok (คลองลัดบางกอก, lit. 'Bangkok Short-Cut Canal'), thus reducing travel times. The Chao Phraya then changed course along the new canal, and the old course became what is known today as Khlong Bangkok Yai (lower section) and Khlong Bangkok Noi (upper section).

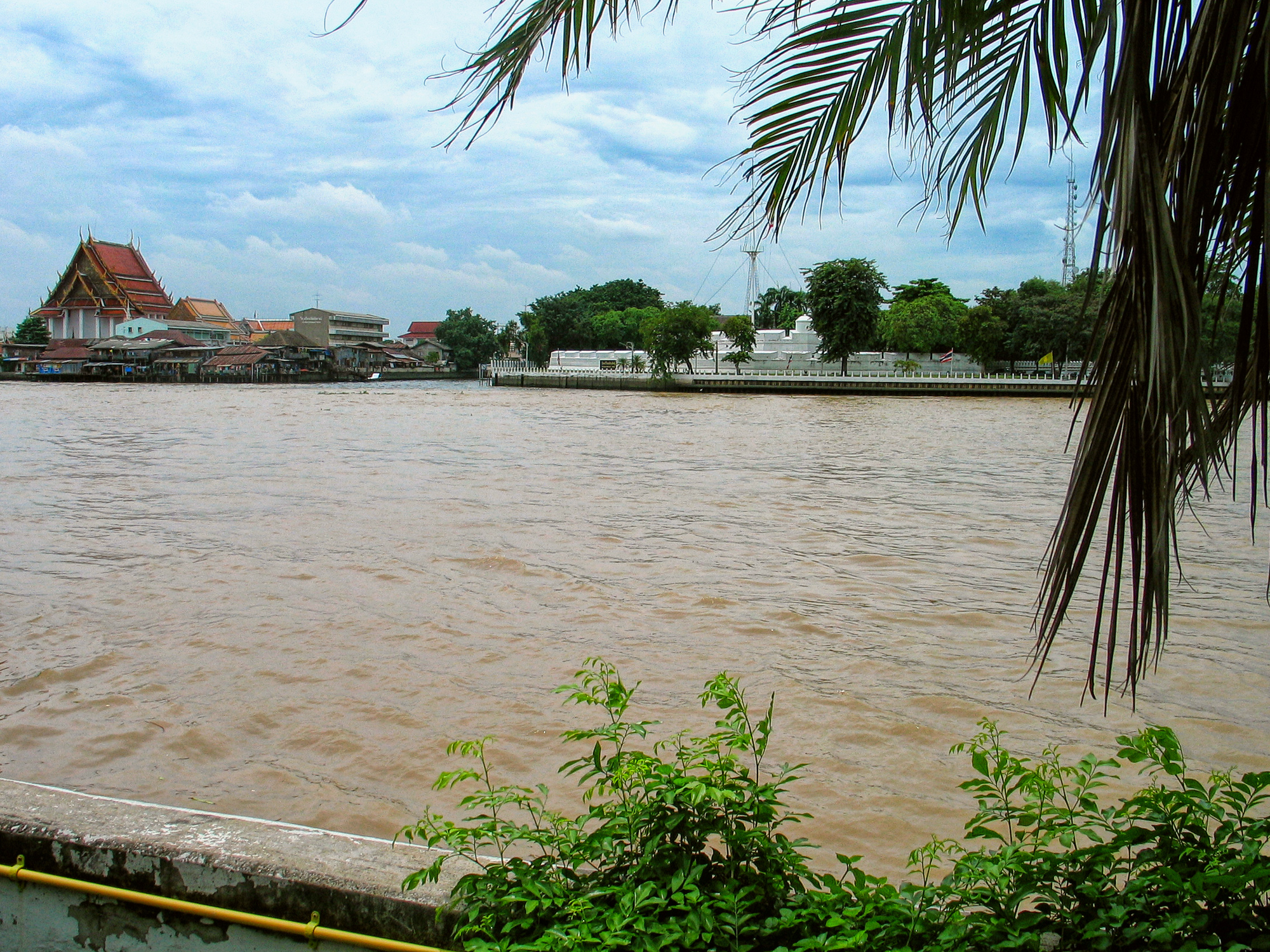
Seen from Tha Tian area, the waterway flanked by Wat Kalayanamitr on the left and Wichai Prasit Fort on the right is the mouth of Khlong Bangkok Yai

In the reign of King Taksin (1767–82) of the Thonburi Kingdom, he founded the new capital, Thonburi, on the west side of the Chao Phraya River. The banks of Khlong Bangkok Yai became the residence of many people, including much of the nobility, giving rise to the names Khlong Bang Luang or Khlong Bang Kha Luang (คลองบางหลวง, คลองบางข้าหลวง, lit. 'Canal of Nobles'). Khlong Bangkok Yai was also the first canal in Thailand to have lampposts installed.

Khlong Bangkok Yai is now a waterway and drainage. It is also a major site of cultural tourism of Bangkok. There are many houses of worship on both sides, such as Wat Molilokayaram, Wat Hongratanaram, Wat Nuannoradit, Wat Kalayanamitr, Wat Paknam Bhasicharoen, Wat Kuhasawan, Bang Luang Mosque, Tonson Mosque, and Kudi Charoenphat, and also historic places such as Khlong Bang Luang Artist House, Talat Phlu or Wichai Prasit Fort.

== See also ==
- Khlong Bangkok Noi – counterpart canal
