= Khlong Bang Luang Artist House =

Art gallery in Bangkok, Thailand

Coordinates: 13.7313°N 100.4633°E

Baan Sinlapin (Thai: บ้านศิลปิน), The Artist's House is an art gallery and puppet theater in Phasi Charoen, Bangkok, Thailand. The building was previously the residence of the Raksamruat family. The last heir of the family sold the property to Mr. Chompol Arkkapantanon, who subsequently renovated it into an art gallery.

== Overview ==
The wooden L-shaped building has only two floors. The second floor is a large gallery space displaying art and photographs. The first floor is divided into different areas, including a puppet theater and a sell zone where tourists can buy souvenirs, such as postcards. The Artist's House is an important learning center for students and art enthusiasts.
