= Phetkasem 48 MRT station =

Metro station in Bangkok, Thailand

Coordinates: 13°42′55.9″N 100°26′43.7″E

เพชรเกษม 48 Phetkasem 48
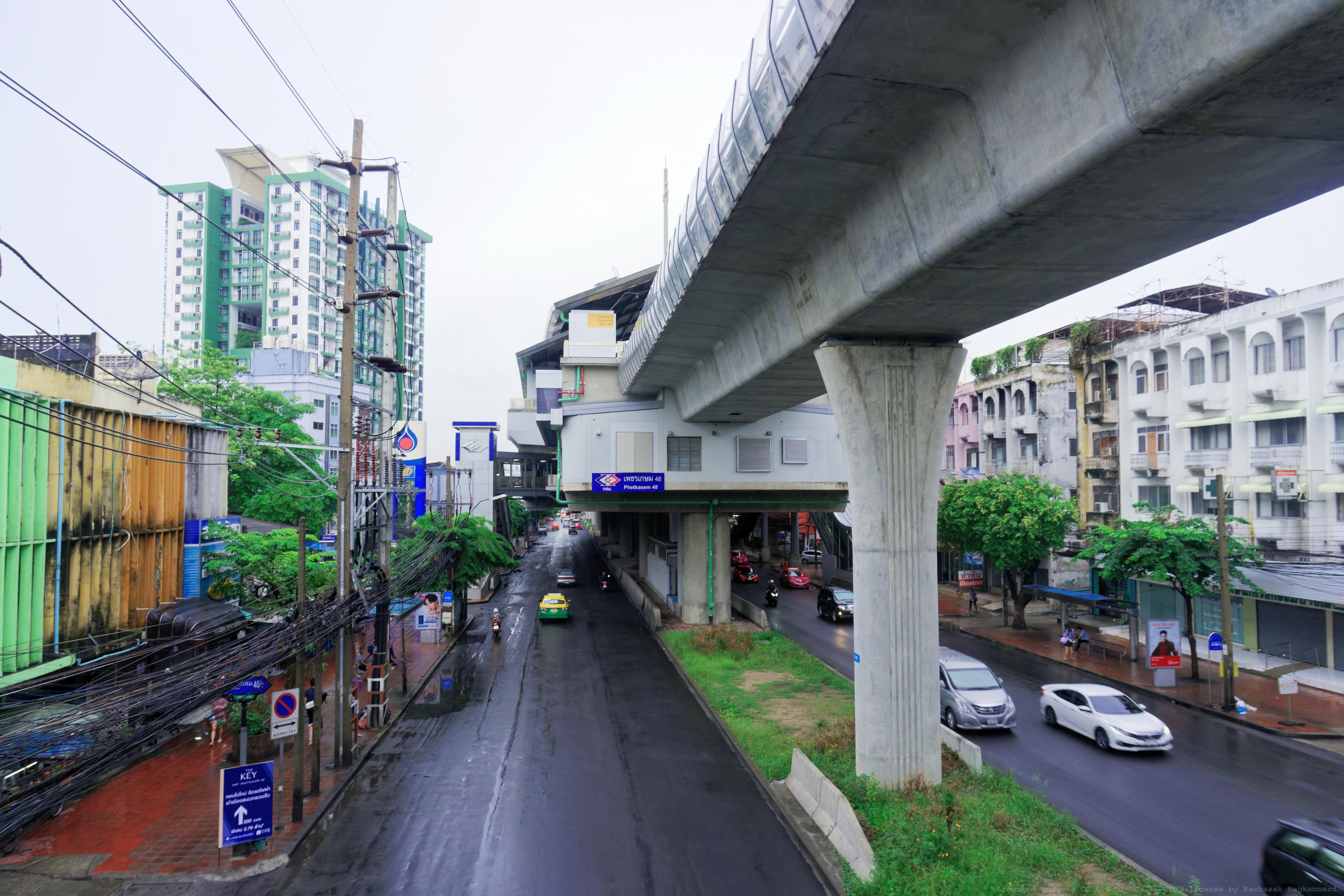
- Phetkasem 48 MRT station over Phet Kasem Road (seen from footbridge near entrance to Wat Chan Pradittharam (Soi Phet Kasem 48))

General information
- Location: Bang Wa Subdistrict, Phasi Charoen District, Bangkok, Thailand
- System: MRT
- Owner: Mass Rapid Transit Authority of Thailand (MRTA)
- Operator: Bangkok Expressway and Metro Public Company Limited (BEM)
- Line: MRT MRT Blue Line
- Platforms: 2 side platforms (4 exits, 2 elevators)

Construction
- Structure type: Elevated

Other information
- Station code: BL35

History
- Opened: 21 September 2019

Passengers
- 2021: 724,353

Services
Preceding station	Metropolitan Rapid Transit	Following station
Phasi Charoen towards Lak Song	Blue Line	Bang Wa towards Tha Phra via Bang Sue
Location

Phetkasem 48 Station Traditional Sign

Phetkasem 48 station (Thai: สถานีเพชรเกษม 48, RTGS: Sathani Phet Kasem Si Sip Paet, pronounced [sā.tʰǎː.nīː pʰét kā.sěːm sìː sìp pɛ̀ːt]) is a Bangkok MRT rapid transit station on the Blue Line, located above Phet Kasem Road in Bangkok, Thailand.

The station is named after the nearby Soi Phet Kasem 48 on the inbound side of Phet Kasem Road. This is a large alley that houses Wat Chan Pradittharam and Chanpradittaram Wittayakom School , and it also serves as a shortcut to other roads in the area, including Bang Waek, Bang Khae, Ratchaphruek, and even Soi Charan Sanitwong 13 on Charan Sanitwong Road, where Charan 13 MRT station is located.

== Nearby places ==
- Wat Chan Pradittharam
- Chanpradittaram Wittayakom School
- Chao Pho Sua Shrine
- Kan-Ari Sportclub

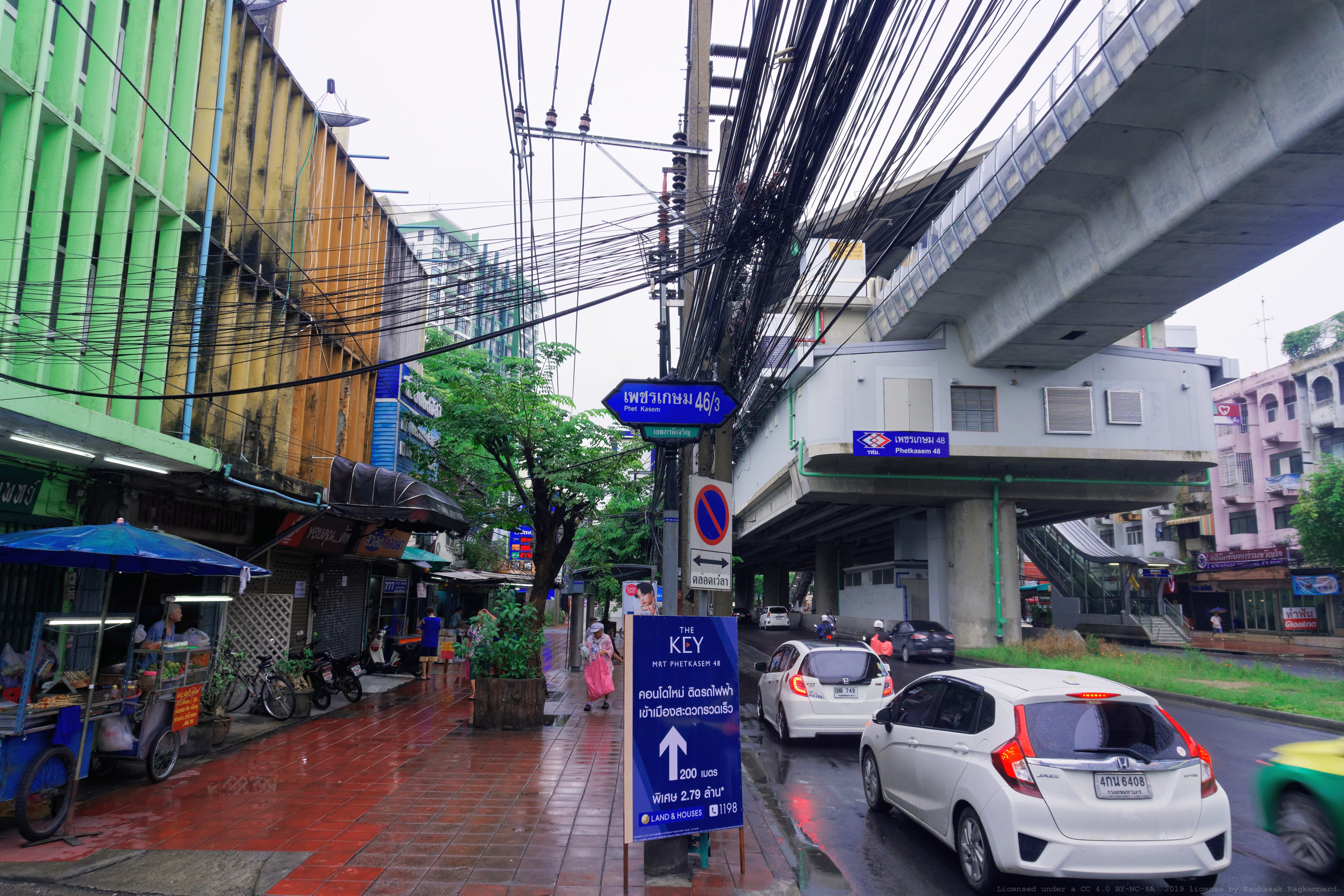
Phetkasem 48 MRT station seen from ground level near bus stop on Phet Kasem Road (inbound)
