= Khlong Khwang subdistrict, Bangkok =

Coordinates: 13.740410°N 100.424345°E

Khlong Khwang คลองขวาง
- Khwaeng
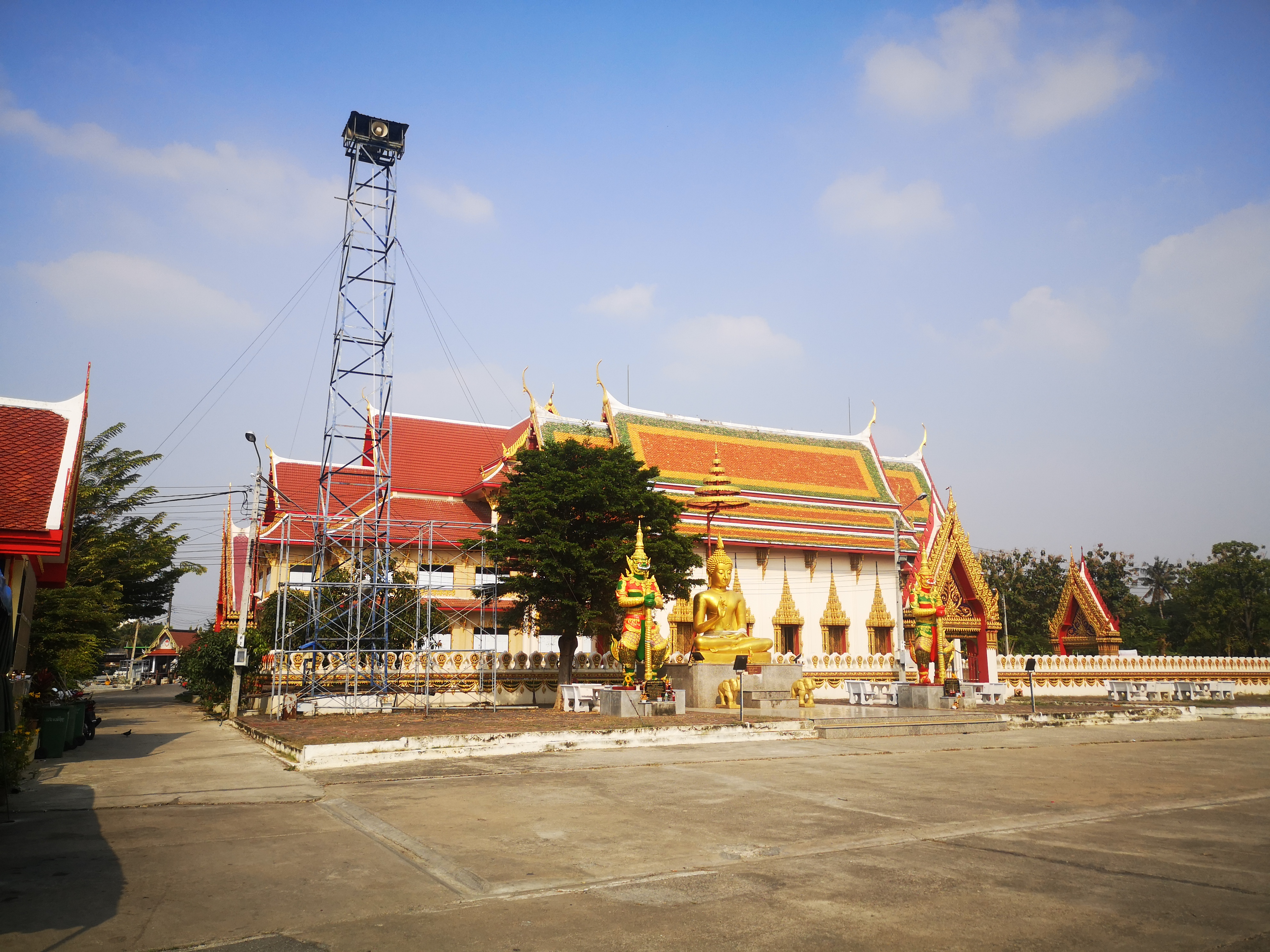
- Wat Maphrao Tia Temple

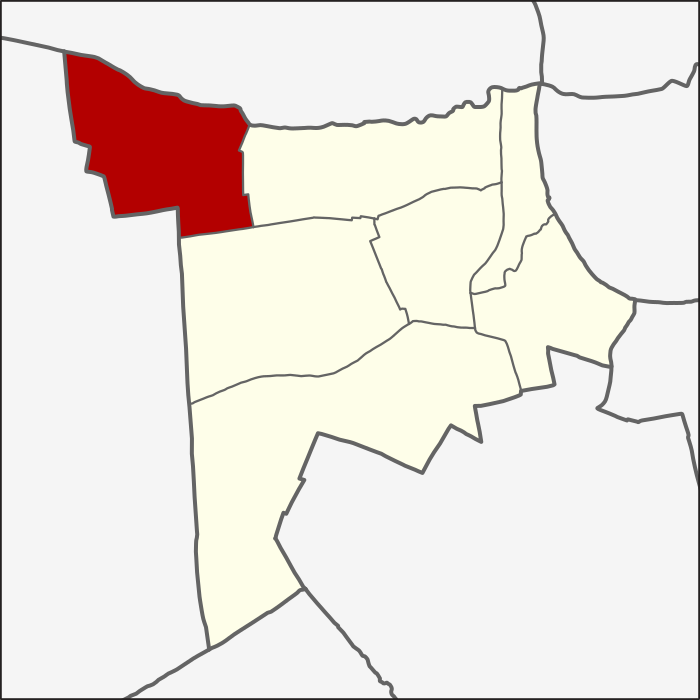
- Location in Phasi Charoen District
- Country: Thailand
- Province: Bangkok
- Khet: Phasi Charoen

Area
  - Total: 2.992 km^{2} (1.155 sq mi)

Population (2020)
  - Total: 10,928
- Time zone: UTC+7 (ICT)
- Postal code: 10160
- TIS 1099: 102208

Khlong Khwang (Thai: คลองขวาง, pronounced [kʰlɔ̄ːŋ kʰwǎːŋ]) is a khwaeng (sub-district) of Phasi Charoen District, Thonburi side of Bangkok.

== Geography ==
Khlong Khwang is a northernmost part of the district, with total area of 2.992 km^{2} (1.155 mi^{2}), regarded as the third largest area of the district (after Bang Wa, Bang Waek).

Its name means "impeded canal", according to the nature of the area, there are many khlongs (canal) intersecting each other. The main watercourses are Khlong Bang Chueak Nang, Khlong Ratcha Montri, Khlong Bang Waek, etc. These canals are also the dividing line of the administrative area.

Most of the area is a waterfront plain. It is a fruit orchard and agricultural area.

Adjoining sub-districts are (from north clockwise): Bang Chueak Nang in Taling Chan District, Bang Waek and Bang Duan in its district, Bang Khae Nuea and Bang Phai in Bang Khae District.

== Demography ==
In late 2020, it had a total population of 10,928 people.

The local way of life is still bonded with the canal. Some canals also have boat noodles sold in boat by sailing along the vicinity waterways, once in a blue moon in modern times.

== Transportation ==
- Bang Waek Road
- Phutthamonthon Sai 1 Road
- Khlong Bang Chueak Nang
- Khlong Ratchamontri

== Places ==
- Wat Maphrao Tia Temple
- Wat Talom Temple
- Chair of Saint Peter Church
- St. Peto Village
- Kadinia Ville
- SISB Thonburi
- St. Peter's School
- Nisachol Tennis Court

Note: not to be confused with another Khlong Khwang in Bangkok, Soi Petchkasem 69 along Khlong Thawi Watthana, a canal that formed a boundary between Bang Khae and Nong Khaem Districts.
