= Phet Kanchanarom Park =

Park in Bangkok, Thailand

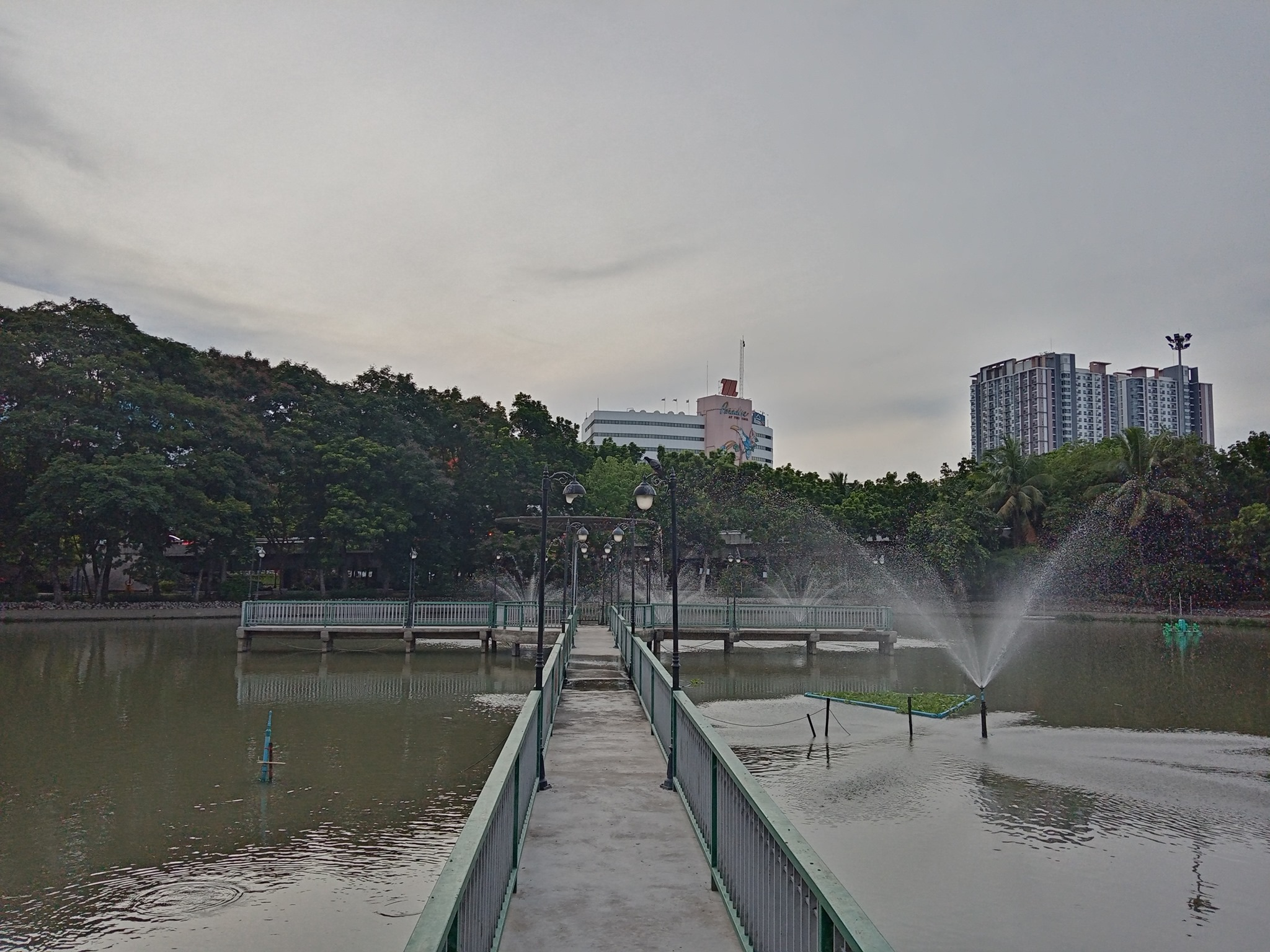
- The lake within the park, The Mall Bangkae is ahead.
- Interactive map of Phet Kanchanarom Park
- Type: Public park
- Location: Kanchanaphisek Road (between Phet Kasem and Kanchanaphisek Roads) Bang Khae Nuea, Bang Khae, Bangkok
- Coordinates: 13°42′41.61″N 100°24′21.06″E
- Area: 3.5 acres (1.4 ha)
- Created: 30 September 2014
- Operator: Bangkok Metropolitan Administration (BMA)
- Status: Open from 05.00 am to 09.00 pm
- Public transit: Lak Song MRT station

Phet Kanchanarom Park (Thai: สวนเพชรกาญจนารมย์) is a small public park in Bangkok, Thailand. It is close to The Mall Bangkae, Lak Song MRT station and Kasemrad BK Hospital.

== History ==
Originally, the park was on the plot of land owned by the Department of Highways. It has been left desolate and has no official name. It is therefore often referred to as "The Park in front of The Mall Bangkae" according to its location beside The Mall Bangkae shopping centre, with only Kanchanaphisek Road (Outer Ring Road) in the middle.

After the great flood in 2011, the park was restored with a budget of more than 10 million baht and was officially named "Phet Kanchanarom". The opening ceremony was held on September 30, 2014, chaired by MR Sukhumbhand Paribatra, Governor of Bangkok.

Its name means "The Pleasure Park of Phet Kasem and Kanchanaphisek" owing its location is the intersection of two roads, Phet Kasem (Highway 4) and Kanchanaphisek.

== Park information ==
It is a small park about 9 rai (1.4 ha; 3.6 acres). The park interior, there are recreation area, playground, small soccer and basketball court, takraw and badminton court along with the ASEAN garden which is the national tree planting plot of ASEAN countries.

The most striking thing is a lake with a pier adorned with lampposts extending into it. At the end is a pavilion. There is also a 500 m (1,640.4 ft) long jogging trail that circles the lake.

The park is open daily from 05.00 am to 09.00 pm.
