= Bang Khae Nuea =

Coordinates: 13.712427°N 100.40733°E

Bang Khae Nuea บางแคเหนือ
- Khwaeng
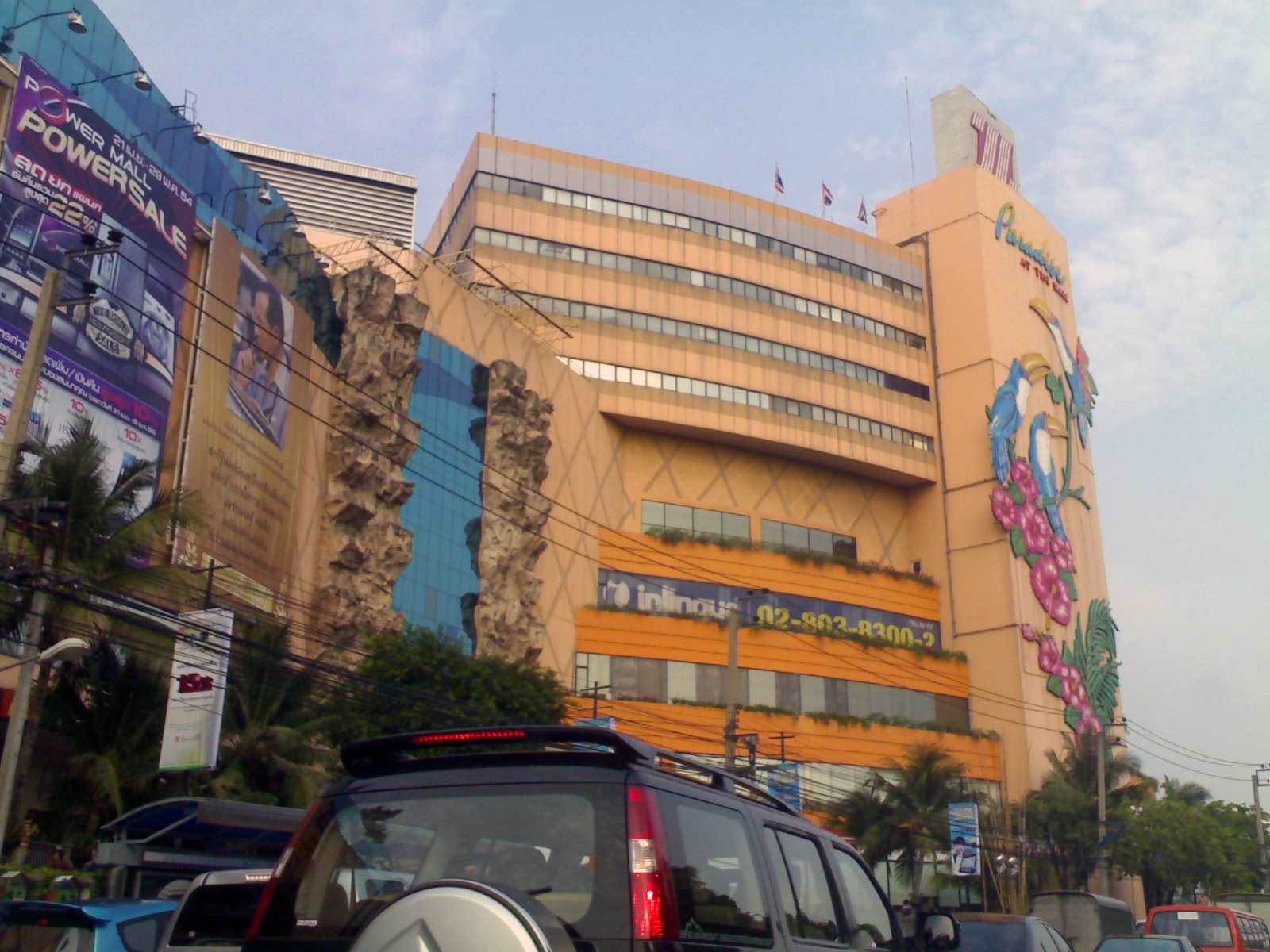
- The Mall Bangkhae on Kanchanaphisek Road (Outer Ring Road) in the area of Bang Khae Nuea

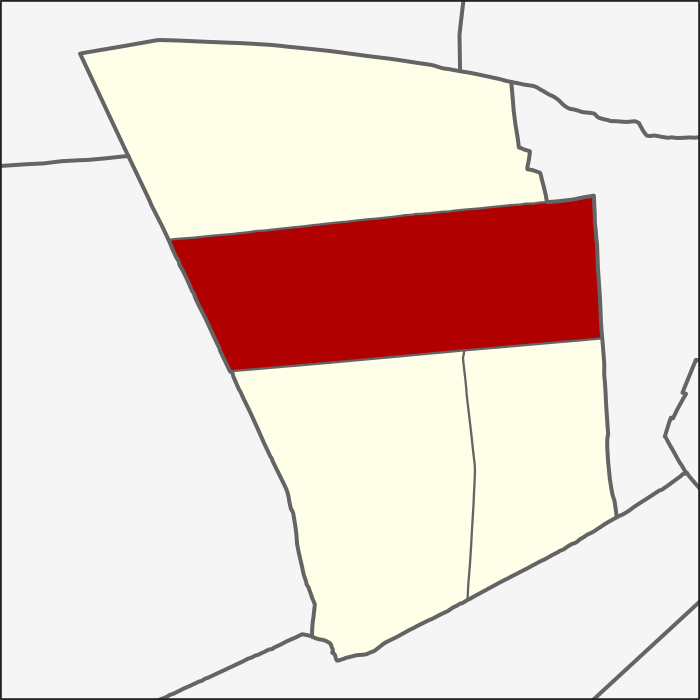
- Location in Bang Khae District
- Country: Thailand
- Province: Bangkok
- Khet: Bang Khae

Area
  - Total: 12.060 km^{2} (4.656 sq mi)

Population (2020)
  - Total: 59,821
- Time zone: UTC+7 (ICT)
- Postal code: 10160
- TIS 1099: 104002

Bang Khae Nuea (Thai: บางแคเหนือ, pronounced [bāːŋ kʰɛ̄ː nɯ̌a]; lit: "north Bang Khae") is a khwaeng (sub-district) of Bang Khae District, Bangkok.

== Geography ==
Bang Khae Nuea is a central area of Bang Khae, with a total area of 12.060 km^{2} (4.656 mi^{2}). It is bounded by other sub-districts (from the north clockwise): Bang Phai in its district, Khlong Khwang in Phasi Charoen District (Khlong Bang Waek is a borderline), Khlong Khwang in Phasi Charoen District (Khlong Phraya Ratchamontri is a borderline), Bang Khae and Lak Song in its district (Phet Kasem Road (Highway 4) is a borderline), Nong Khang Phlu in Nong Khaem District (Khlong Thawi Watthana is a borderline).

== Population ==
In 2019, it had a total population of 60,111 people.

== Places ==
- The Mall Bangkhae
- Bang Khae MRT station (shared with Bang Khae)
- Lak Song MRT station (shared with Bang Khae)
- Bangkhae Condotown
- Lak Song Police Station
- Phasi Charoen Post Office
- Kasemrad BK Hospital
- Rajavinit Bangkae Pankhum School
- Muban Setthakit
