= Bang Chueak Nang =

Sub-district in Bangkok, Thailand

Coordinates: 13°44′50.8″N 100°25′13.7″E

Bang Chueak Nang บางเชือกหนัง
- Khwaeng
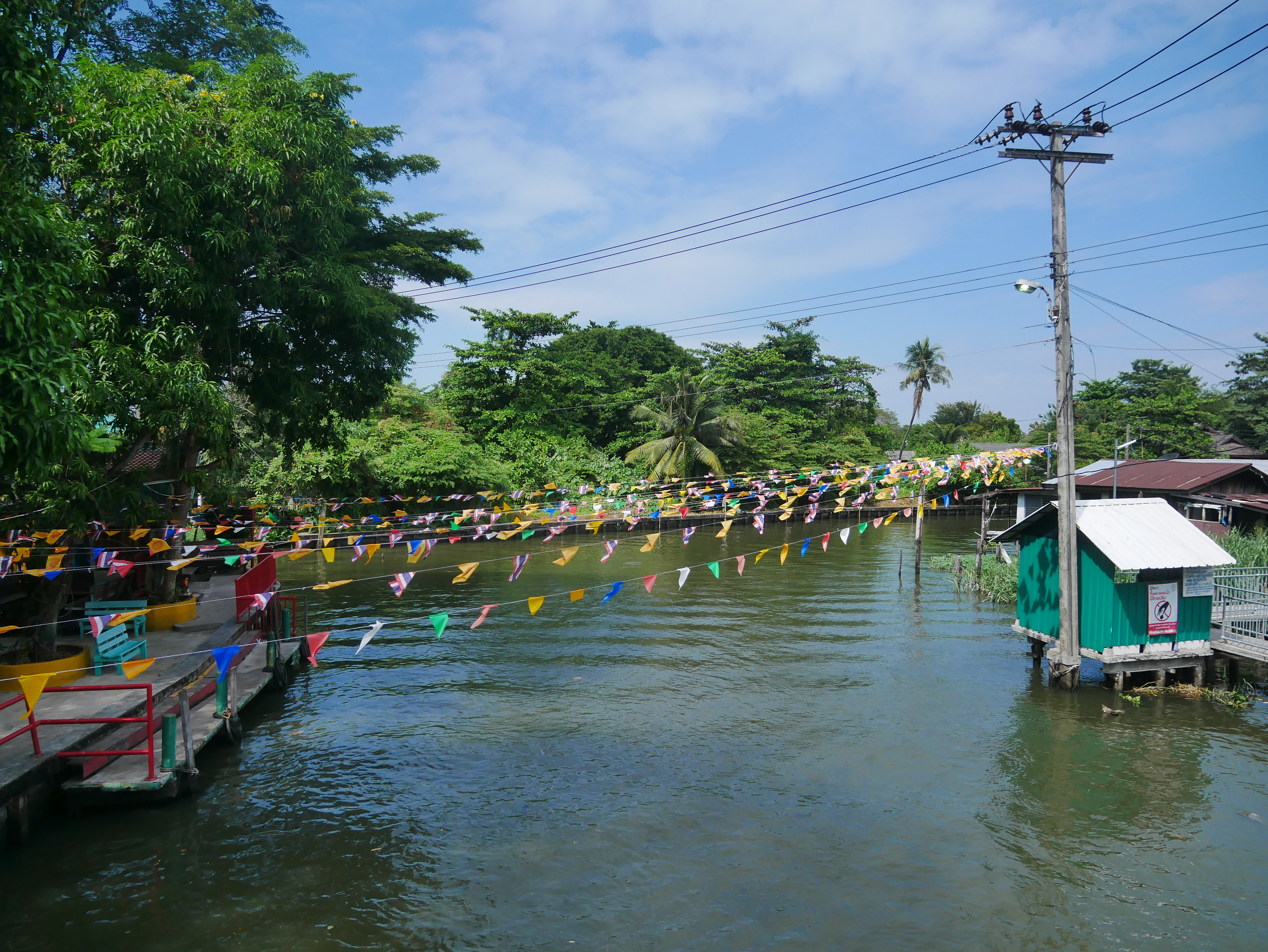
- The confluence of two canals Khlong Bang Chueak Nang and Khlong Bang Noi, where the Wat Ko is situated

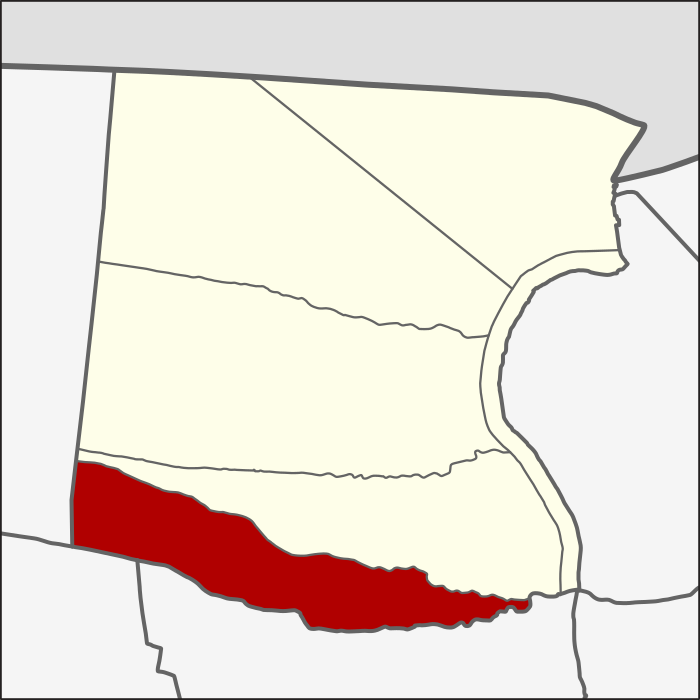
- Location in Taling Chan District
- Country: Thailand
- Province: Bangkok
- Khet: Taling Chan

Area
  - Total: 2.915 km^{2} (1.125 sq mi)

Population (2020)
  - Total: 12,002
- Time zone: UTC+7 (ICT)
- Postal code: 10170
- TIS 1099: 101907

Bang Chueak Nang (Thai: บางเชือกหนัง, pronounced [bāːŋ tɕʰɯ̂ak nǎŋ]) is one of the six khwaengs (subdistricts) of Taling Chan District in Bangkok's Thonburi side. The subdistrict contained 12 administrative villages.

== History and toponymy ==
Its name after Khlong Bang Chueak Nang that flows through the southern area and considered to be the main watercourse of locals. The khlong that separates from the Khlong Mon to the south, along with Khlong Bang Noi which separates to the west.

Khlong Bang Chuek Nang has a starting point from the Wat Ko temple and long flowing as far as converging with Khlong Thawi Watthana near the Wat Sala Daeng temple on the border between Bang Khae and Thawi Watthana Districts, total length 12 km (7.5 mi).

Bang Chueak Nang is an area with a history of more than 500 years, along with the neighbouring Bang Ramat. They are mentioned in Kamsuan Samut, an ancient literature from the early Ayutthaya period; and are hence considered as two of the oldest communities in Bangkok. Despite the name Bang Chueak Nang literally meaning "place of leather ropes" in the present-day Thai language; in Kamsuan Samut (กำสรวลสมุทร), the area was called Bang Chanang (บางฉนัง). The word chanang is a borrowing from the Khmer chhnang meaning "pottery". Therefore, assuming that the name Bang Chanang was not, in turn, a corruption of any previous name, the earliest people living in the area could be dedicated to pottery production.

Originally, Bang Chueak Nang was a tambon of Amphoe Taling Chan of Thon Buri Province. Later, the new government administration regulations were revised in 1985. Bang Chueak Nang therefore changed its tambon status to that of a khwaeng of Khet Taling Chan as it is today.

== Geography ==
Bang Chueak Nang can be considered as a southernmost area of the district, with a total area of 2,178.75 rai (about 861 acres), divided into agricultural areas 1,183 rai (about 467 acres).

Neighbouring subdistricts are (from north clockwise): Bang Phrom in its district, Bang Waek, Khlong Khwang of Phasi Charoen District, Bang Phai of Bang Khae District, and Thawi Watthana of Thawi Watthana District.

Most of the area are vegetable gardens.

There are three elementary schools, three Thai temples, and one Christian church.

== Economy ==
Bang Chueak Nang residents work in agriculture, government service and trade.

== Transport ==
- Ratchaphruek Road
- Phutthamonthon Sai 1 Road
- Phran Nok–Phutthamonthan Sai 4 Road
- Kanchanaphisek Road (Outer Ring Road)
- Bang Chueak Nang Road
- Soi Bang Chueak Nang 9 (Ngoen Udom/ Siri Watthana)
