= Phasi Charoen MRT station =

Metro station in Bangkok, Thailand

Coordinates: 13°42′46.5″N 100°26′06.7″E

ภาษีเจริญ Phasi Charoen
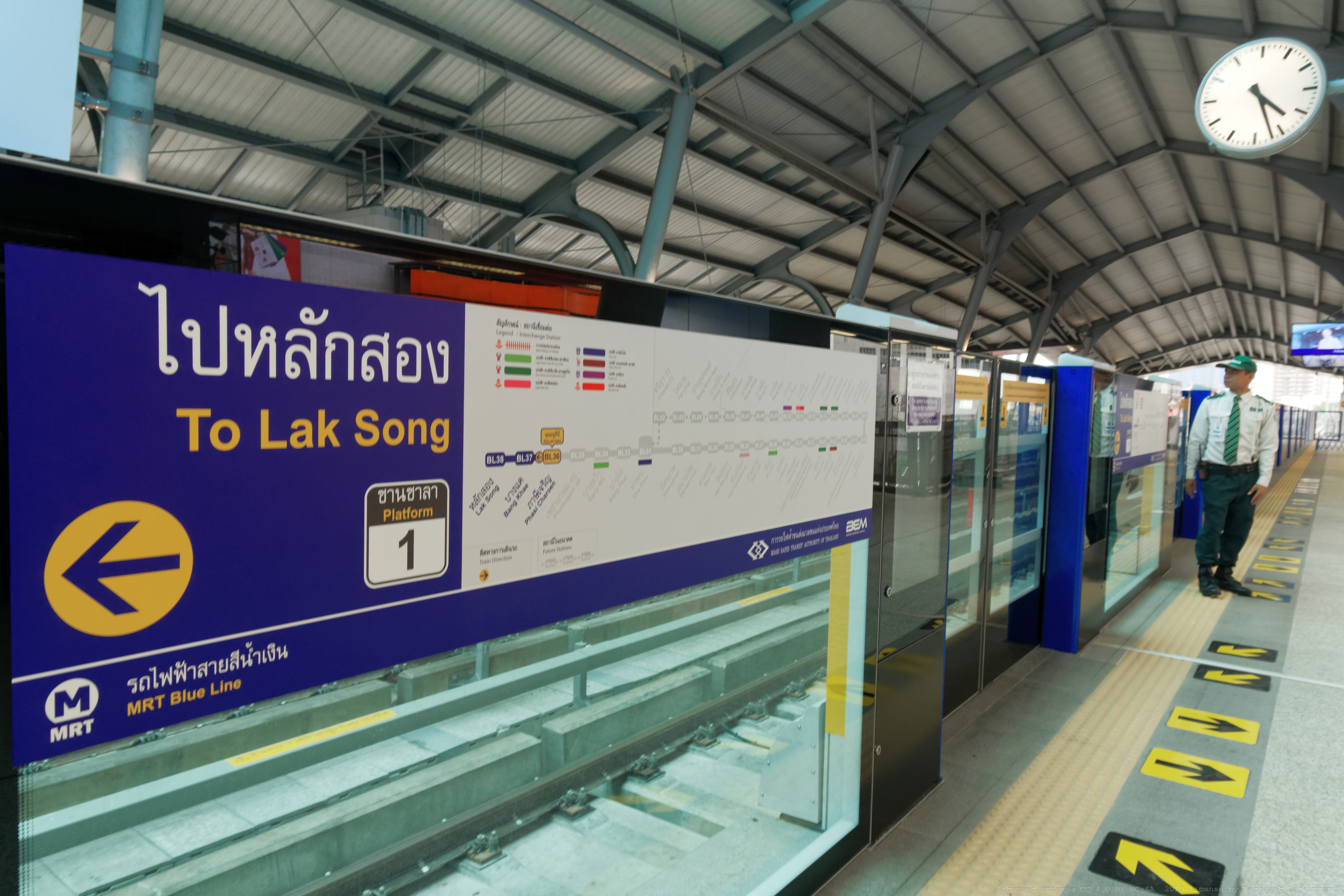
- Sign showing route information of platform 1 of Phasi Charoen MRT station

General information
- Location: Bang Wa Subdistrict, Phasi Charoen District, Bangkok, Thailand
- System: MRT
- Owner: Mass Rapid Transit Authority of Thailand (MRTA)
- Operator: Bangkok Expressway and Metro Public Company Limited (BEM)
- Line: MRT MRT Blue Line
- Platforms: 2 side platforms (4 exits, 2 elevators)

Construction
- Structure type: Elevated

Other information
- Station code: BL36

History
- Opened: 21 September 2019; 6 years ago

Passengers
- 2021: 1,693,460

Services
Preceding station	Metropolitan Rapid Transit	Following station
Bang Khae towards Lak Song	Blue Line	Phetkasem 48 towards Tha Phra via Bang Sue
Location

Phasi Charoen station (Thai: สถานีภาษีเจริญ, pronounced [sā.tʰǎː.nīː pʰāː.sǐː t͡ɕā.rɤ̄ːn]) is a Bangkok MRT rapid transit station served by Blue Line, located above Phet Kasem Road, in Bangkok, Thailand.

The station is close to Soi Phet Kasem 54 where Phasi Charoen District Office is situated and it has a connection to the shopping mall Seacon Bangkae by elevated pathway.

== Gallery ==
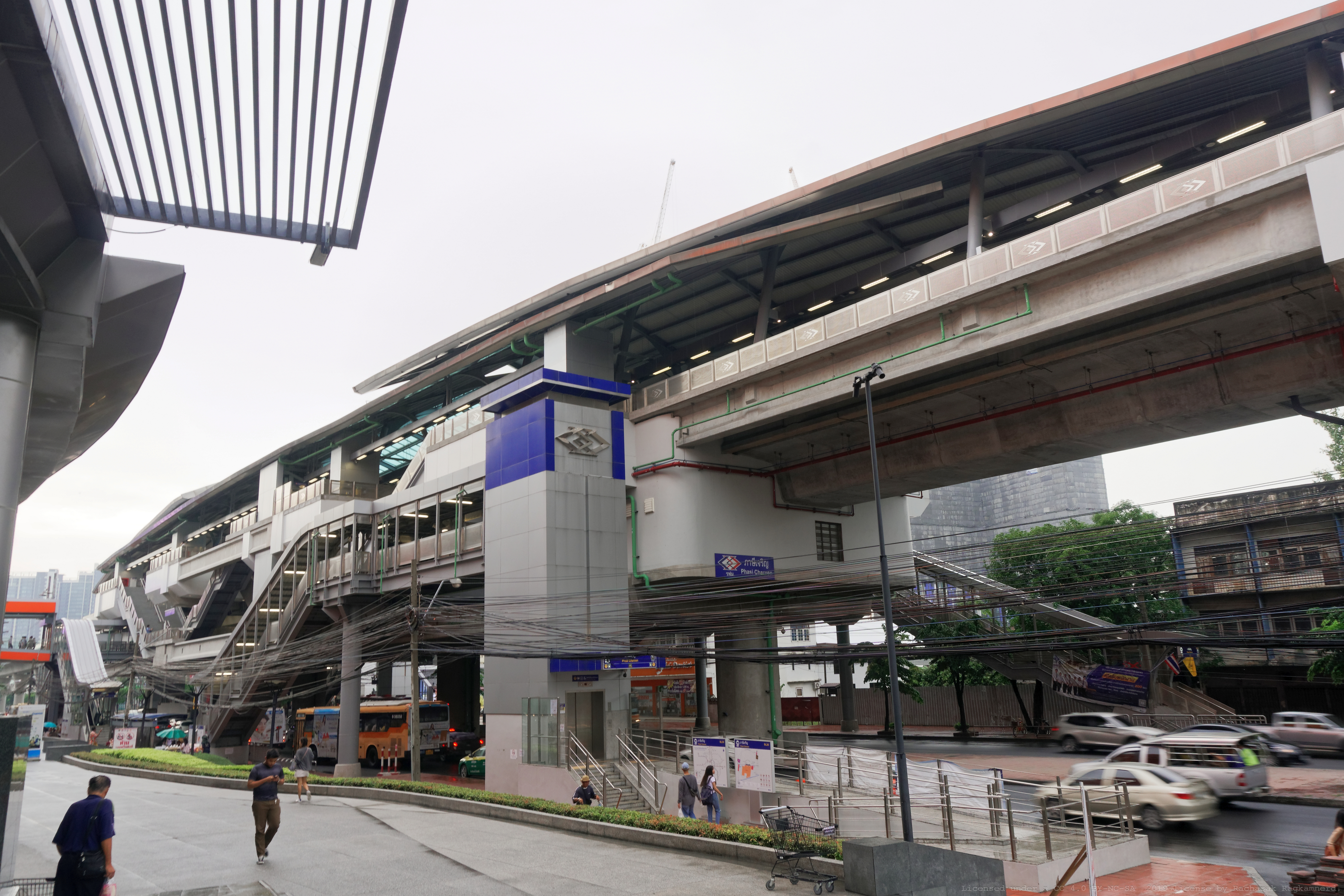
Phasi Charoen station

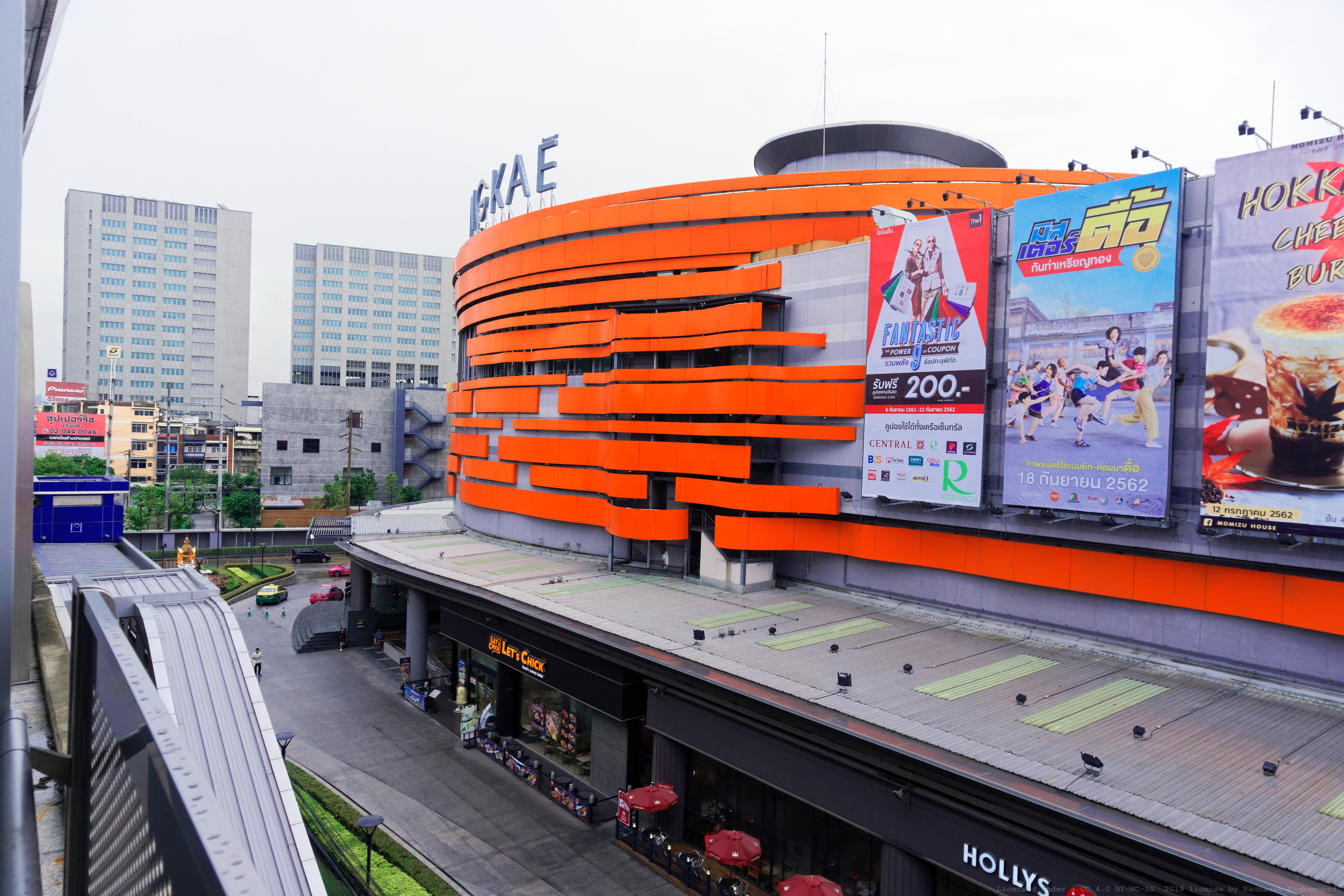
Seacon Bangkae seen from station

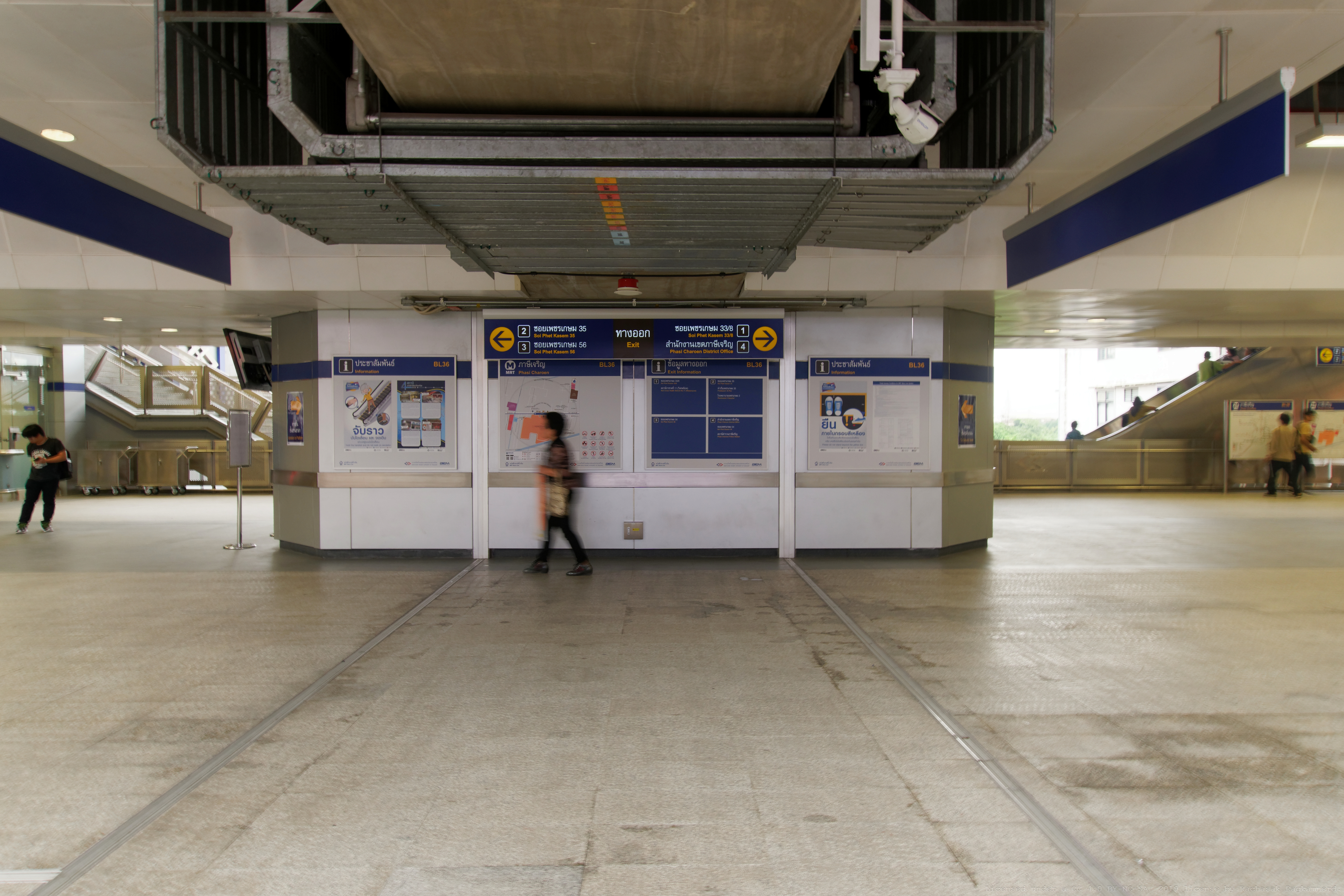
Ticket Hall
