= Bang Khae subdistrict, Bangkok =

Khwaeng in Thailand, SE Asia

Bang Khae บางแค
- Khwaeng
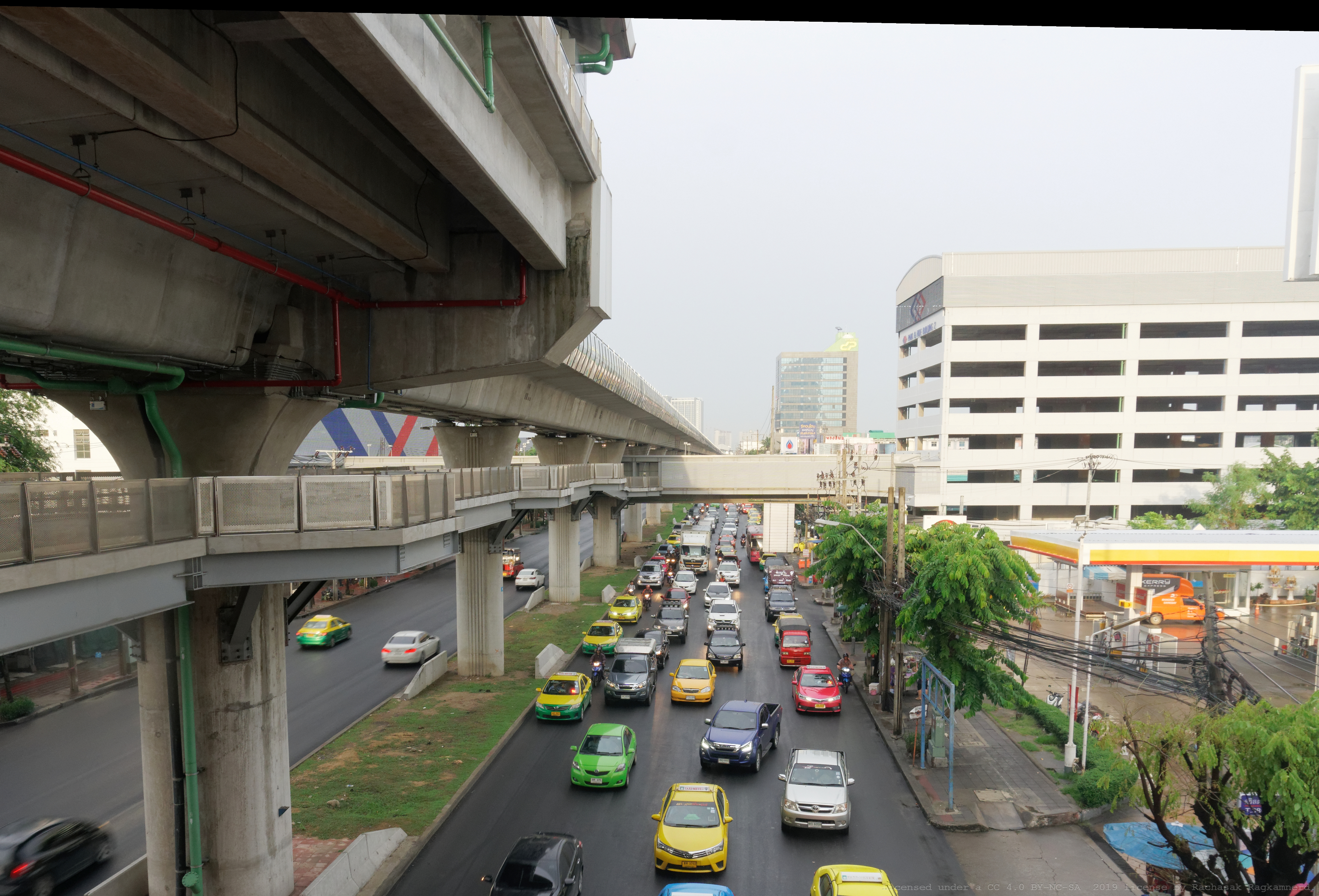
- Phet Kasem Road near Lak Song MRT station (Bang Khae Subdistrict side) in 2019

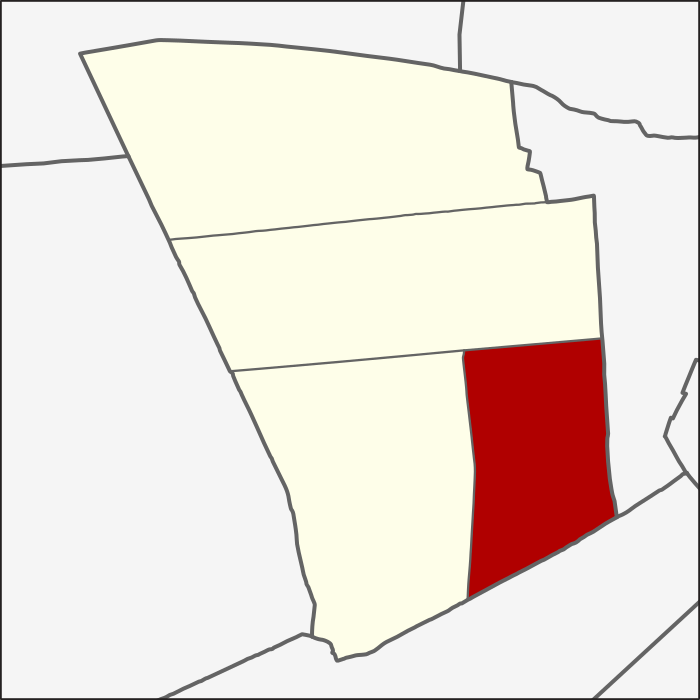
- Location in Bang Khae District
- Country: Thailand
- Province: Bangkok
- Khet: Bang Khae

Area
  - Total: 6.486 km^{2} (2.504 sq mi)

Population (2020)
  - Total: 38,915
- Time zone: UTC+7 (ICT)
- Postal code: 10160
- TIS 1099: 104001
- Website: N/A

Bang Khae (Thai: บางแค, pronounced [bāːŋ kʰɛ̄ː]) is a khwaeng (subdistrict) of Bang Khae District, in Bangkok, Thailand. In 2020, it had a total population of 38,915 people.

== History ==
In 1902, coinciding with the King Chulalongkorn (Rama V)'s reign, Bang Khae had the status of a tambon in the newly planted amphoe, Nong Khaem. It took the name Tambon Lak Nueng (หลักหนึ่ง, pronounced [làk nɯ̀ŋ]).

The name Lak Nueung, meaning "the first milestone", refers to the first milestone of Khlong Phasi Charoen, a khlong (canal) that flows through the area. It is a waterway dug during King Mongkut (Rama IV)'s reign bridging Bangkok to Krathum Baen of Samut Sakhon Province.
