= Muban Setthakit =

Coordinates: 13°43′06.9″N 100°22′40.3″E

Muban Setthakit (Thai: หมู่บ้านเศรษฐกิจ) is a housing estate in the area of Bang Khae Nuea Subdistrict, Bang Khae District, Bangkok, regarded as one of the largest and oldest housing estates and communities in the Thonburi side (area on the west bank of the Chao Phraya River in Bangkok).

The housing estate was established in late 1960 at the same time as founding of nearby Assumption College Thonburi. They were built on the land of Thangai Suwannathat, Democrat MP for Thonburi Province and real estate investor. He donated his family's land to build a school and divided the land into blocks to build housing for low-income people, hence the name "Setthakit" in Thai, meaning 'economy'. It is the first housing estate in Thailand.

Muban Setthakit in the 1960s was regarded as a recreation place for people in the suburbs of Thonburi, because in addition to being a residence was also developed into a large lake that can go pedal boat cycling. Replica of the ancient towns was also built to serve as a filming location for movies. They are named after different towns in the Nanzhao Realm were Nakhon Lung and Nakhon Pa, thus making this place a tourist destination by default. Suwannathat named them "Bangkok Noi Recreation Centre".

Nowadays, the lake still has some left (some have been reclaimed to make roads and traffic circles), but the replica ancient towns are no more. They had become a wasteland and the spirit house, only the stories remain. Nakhon Lung Road, a narrow street in the form of soi (alley) was named after the town's replica.

Traveling to Muban Setthakit in the pre-1973, there was only one bus route that arrived, namely line 41 (Muban Setthakit–Sanam Luang). But after the Phra Pinklao Bridge was opened that connects the Bangkok core and the Thonburi side, the bus arrive here have been changed to line 91 (Muban Setthakit–Sanam Luang) until the present.

In the 2011 flooding, Muban Setthakit were one of the most severely affected areas.
