= Bang Khae MRT station =

Metro station in Bangkok, Thailand

Coordinates: 13°42′43.5″N 100°25′22.3″E

บางแค Bang Khae
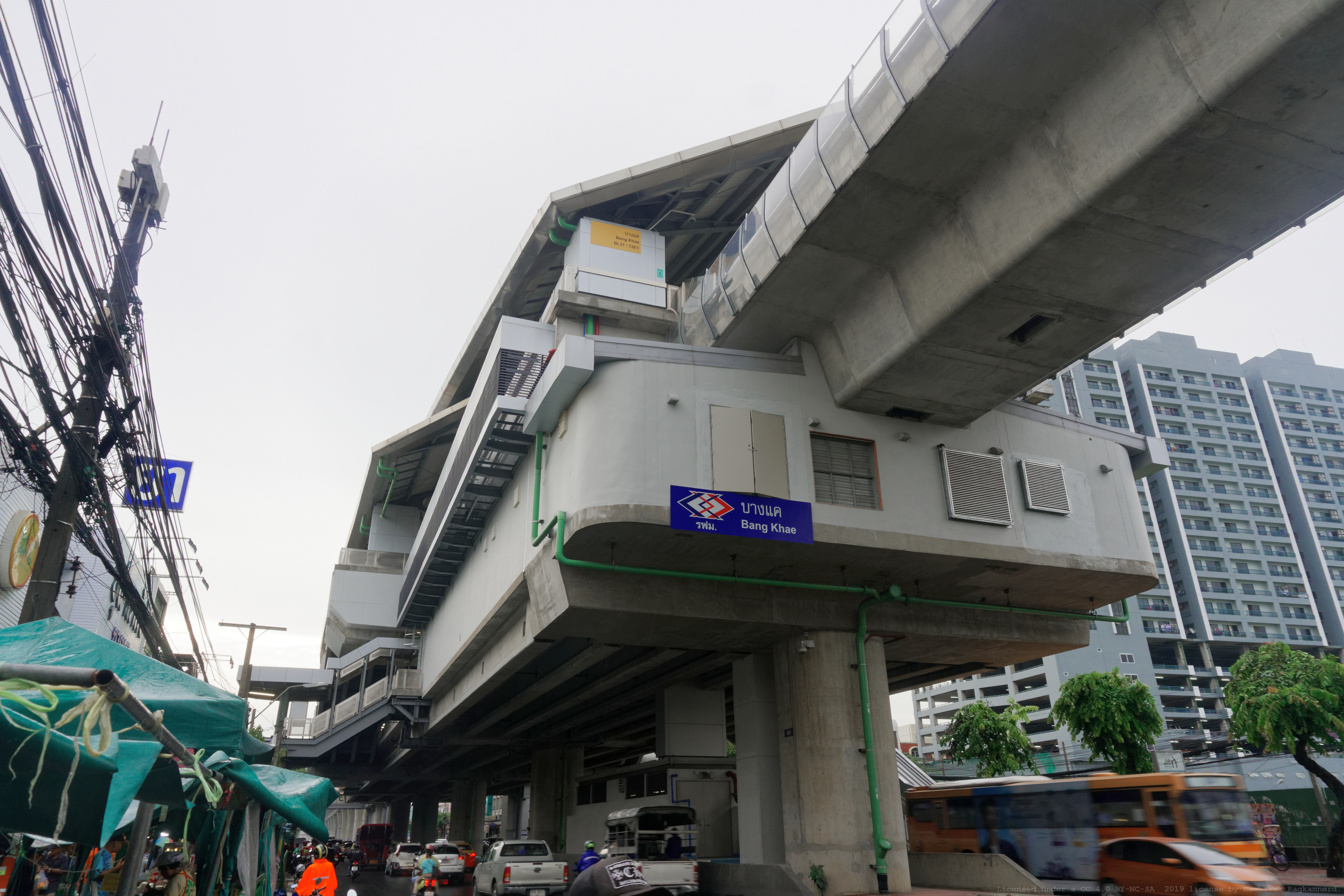

General information
- Location: Bang Khae and Bang Khae Nuea Subdistricts, Bang Khae District, Bangkok, Thailand
- System: MRT
- Owner: Mass Rapid Transit Authority of Thailand (MRTA)
- Operator: Bangkok Expressway and Metro Public Company Limited (BEM)
- Line: MRT MRT Blue Line
- Platforms: 2 side platforms (4 exits, 2 elevators)

Construction
- Structure type: Elevated

Other information
- Station code: BL37

History
- Opened: 21 September 2019; 6 years ago

Passengers
- 2021: 1,254,851

Services
Preceding station	Metropolitan Rapid Transit	Following station
Lak Song Terminus	Blue Line	Phasi Charoen towards Tha Phra via Bang Sue
Location

Bang Khae station (Thai: สถานีบางแค) is a Bangkok MRT rapid transit station on the Blue Line, located above Phet Kasem Road, in Bangkok, Thailand.

The station located in the area of Bang Khae Market, one of largest and oldest wet market in Thonburi side and Bangkok.
