= Khlong Mon =

Canal in Bangkok, Thailand

Coordinates: 13°44′43.68″N 100°28′28.71″E

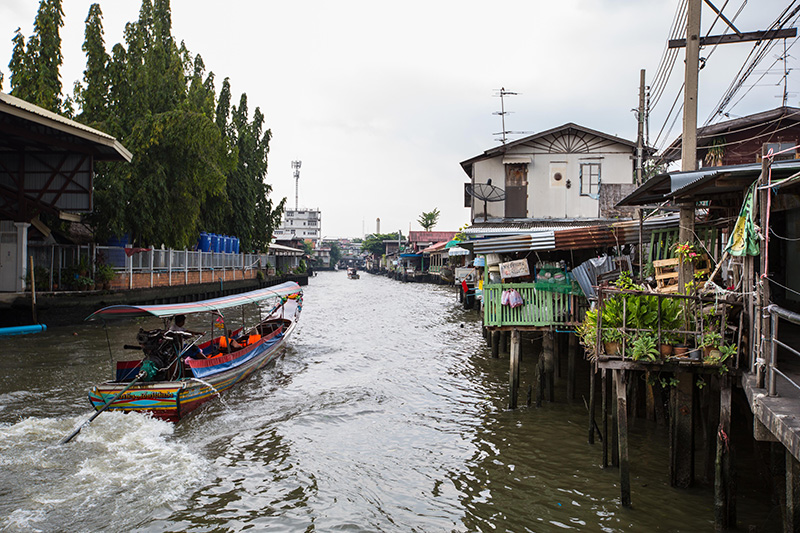
- Long-tail boat sailing in the khlong
- Interactive map of Khlong Mon

Specifications
- Length: 3 km (1.9 miles)

Geography
- Start point: Bangkok
- End point: Bangkok
- Connects to: Chao Phraya River, Khlong Bang Khun Si, Khlong Bangkok Yai, Khlong Bang Chueak Nang

Khlong Mon (Thai: คลองมอญ, pronounced [kʰlɔ̄ːŋ mɔ̄ːn]) is a khlong (canal) in Bangkok's Thonburi side. Khlong Mon has been dug since Ayutthaya period and delineates the border between Bangkok Yai and Bangkok Noi Districts. It has a starting from the west bank of the Chao Phraya River at the area beside the Royal Thai Navy Council passing Khlong Ban Khamin, which is the original city moat since Thonburi was the capital, to reach Khlong Bang Khun Si, also known as Khlong Chak Phra, which is the original Chao Phraya River, and Khlong Bangkok Yai. Then itself continuing on to the west as Khlong Bang Chueak Nang.

Khlong Bang Chueak Nang when flowing to Wat Ko temple, it splits into two courses, the upper course called Khlong Bang Noi, while the lower course called Khlong Bang Chueak Nang and formed a boundary between Taling Chan with Phasi Charoen Districts.

The khlong is called Khlong Mon from the reason that this area was the settlement of Mon ethnic people, and also called Khlong Bang Sao Thong (คลองบางเสาธง). The khlong was regarded as a strategic waterway. Therefore, a post was constructed on the khlong to be a checkpoint of the transported merchandises and passengers. The Mon peoples were appointed as the post-keepers. Throughout the 3 km (1.9 mi) length of the khlong, there are numerous old and important temples such as Wat Khrueawan, Wat Nak Klang, Wat Phraya Tham, Wat Chinorot, Wat Khrut, Wat Pho Riang, Wat Bang Sao Thong. Nowadays, the khlong is one of the famous foreign tourists' tour routes as well as Khlong Bangkok Yai or Khlong Bangkok Noi.

The cabinet had a resolution in 1967 to have Khlong Mon as a preserved khlong.
