= The Mall Lifestore Bangkae =

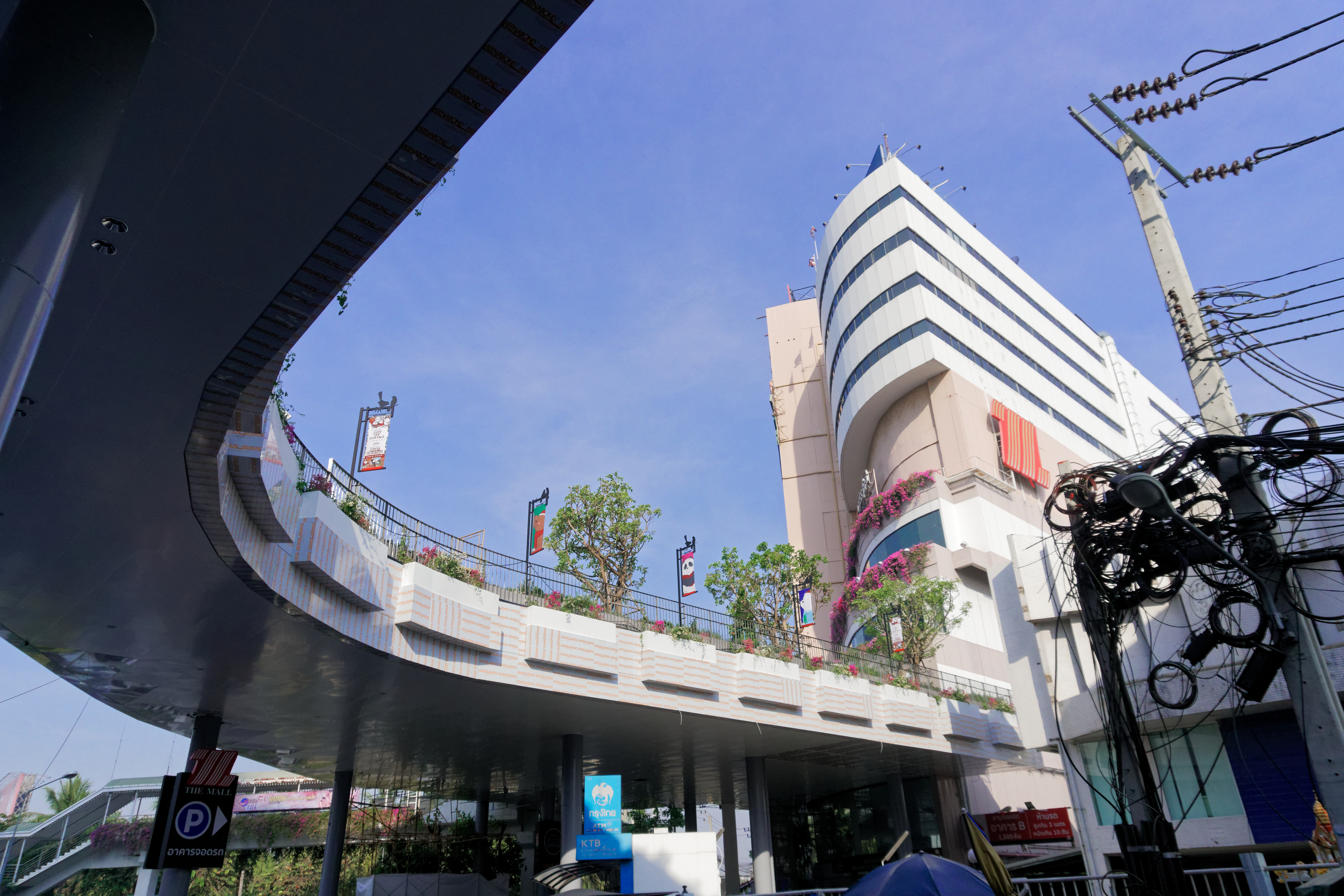
- The Mall Lifestore Bangkae and skywalk linking Lak Song station in 2019.
- Location: Phetkasem Road, Bang Khae Nuea, Bang Khae, Bangkok, Thailand
- Coordinates: 13.713215°N 100.408054°E
- Opened: August 5, 1994
- Developer: The Mall Group
- Manager: The Mall Group
- Owner: The Mall Group
- Num. of stores: More than 500 stores
- Floor area: 350,000 m^{2} (3,800,000 sq ft)
- Floors: 4 (excluding the G floor)
- Parking: More than 4,000 cars
- Website: themallgroup.com

The Mall Lifestore Bangkae (Thai: เดอะมอลล์ไลฟ์สโตร์บางแค, previously known as The Mall Bangkae) is a shopping mall under The Mall Group, located at the Phet–Kanchana junction, a three-way junction where Phetkasem Road meets Kanchanaphisek Road, in Bang Khae Nuea Subdistrict, Bang Khae District, Bangkok.

== History ==
It opened in 1994, alongside The Mall Bang Kapi in eastern Bangkok, under the same concept, "Paradise at the Mall," with both the interior and exterior designed to resemble a lush, garden-like paradise. On the Kanchanaphisek Road side, there is a large open plaza running parallel to the mall, landscaped with trees and used for various activities as well as a public recreational space. Inside, the mall features a stream with ornamental koi fish, cichlid, and parrots. A key highlight is a large artificial waterfall cascading dramatically into a pond more than 3 m (9.8 ft) deep in front of the glass elevator, where several species of large fish are kept, including arapaima and iridescent shark.

The rooftop features a water park and amusement area known as "Fantasia Lagoon," similar to those at other The Mall branches at the time.

In 2020, a major renovation began to transform the mall into "The Mall Lifestore," aiming to modernize it and better cater to a new generation of consumers. In particular, The Mall Bangkae was envisioned by The Mall Group's management as a new destination for western Bangkok, or the Thonburi side.

Rebranded as The Mall Lifestore Bangkae, the mall features seven "Life Wonders," each representing different lifestyle experiences. These include relaxing green spaces and a pet-friendly area, a vibrant food court offering a wide selection of well-known eateries, as well as zones dedicated to beauty and entertainment. The mall also hosts year-round activities and events, ensuring a lively atmosphere throughout the year. The renovation was completed and the mall reopened in 2024.

== Anchors ==
- The Mall Department Store
  - Power Mall
  - Sports Mall
  - Beauty Mall
  - Be Trend
- Gourmet Market
  - Gourmet Eats
- SF Cinema Bang Khae 8 Cinemas
- SB Design Square
- Uniqlo
- Muji
- Fitness First
- Harbor Land
  - Harbor Island
- MCC Hall Bangkae

== Transportation ==
The Mall Lifestore Bangkae can be accessed by various public bus routes operated by the BMTA and private operators, including routes 4-57, 4-36 (7), 4-48 (7ก), 4-43 (80), 4-45 (81), 4-46 (84), 4-60 (91), 91ก, 4-5 (101), 4-52 (146), 4-25 (147), 4-55 (163), 4-56 (165), 4-59 (189), 4-60 (509), and 4-63 (547) as well as by the MRT Blue Line via Lak Song station (BL38). In addition, the area is also served by several local minibus songthaew routes. The connecting skywalk between the station and the mall's second floor was completed and opened in 2019.

== See also ==
- List of shopping malls in Thailand
