= Lak Song =

Coordinates: 13°41′08.6″N 100°23′54.1″E

Lak Song หลักสอง
- Khwaeng
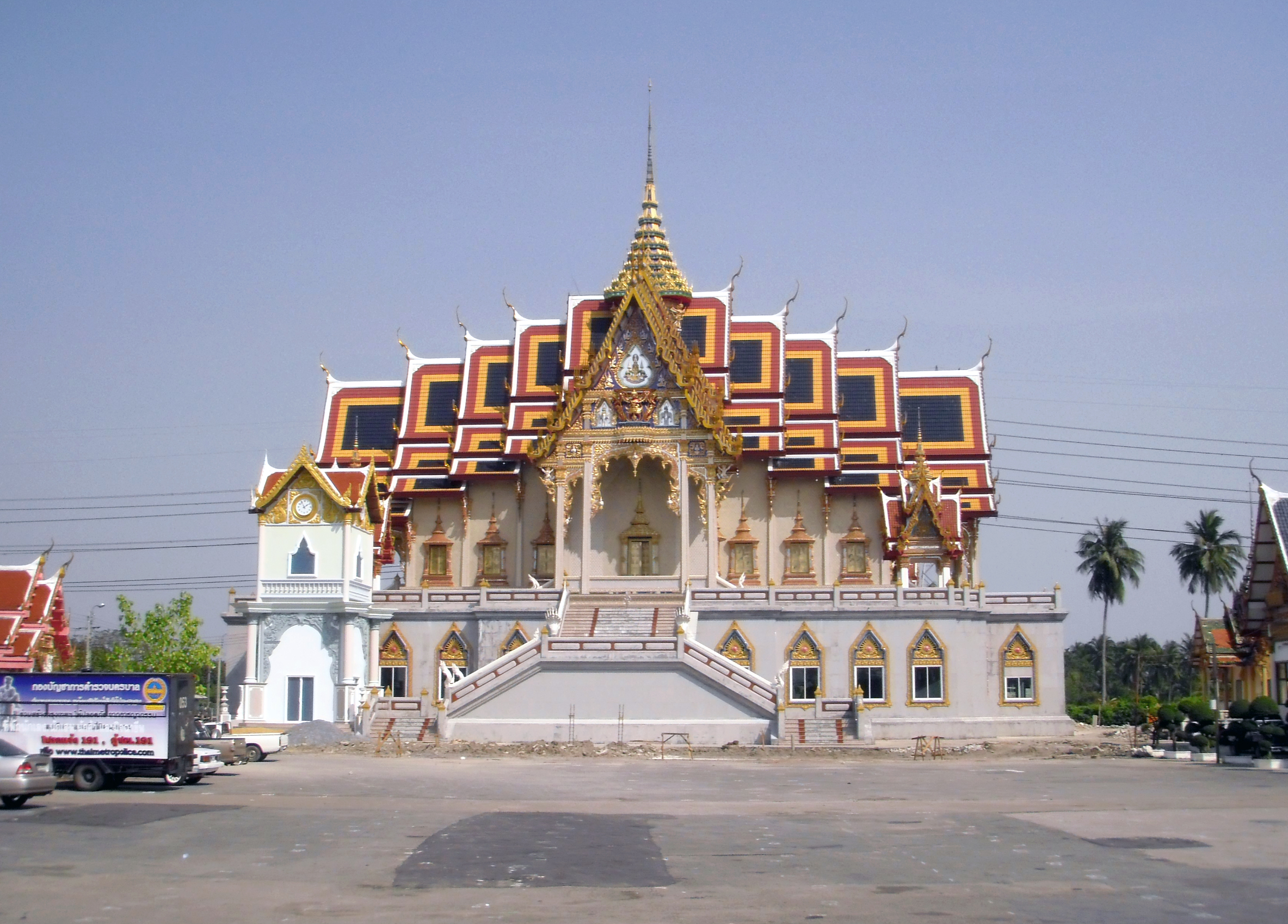
- Main hall of Wat Muang.

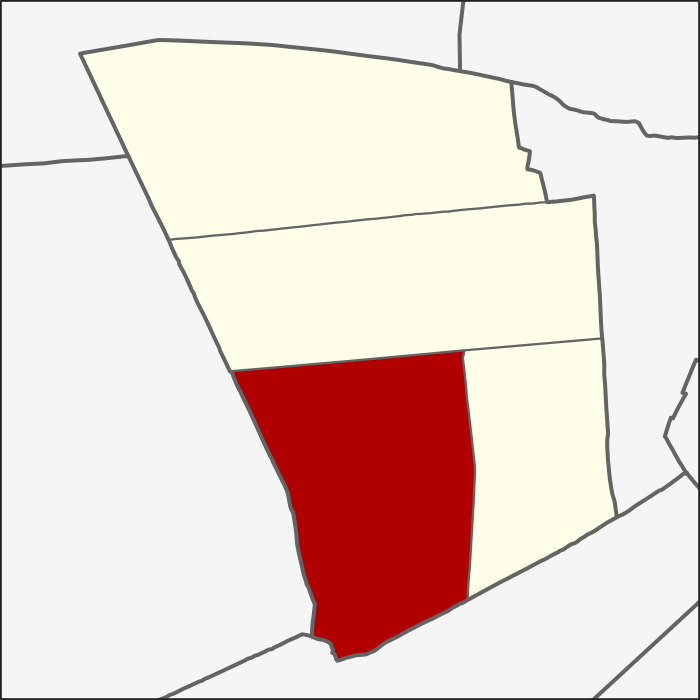
- Location in Bang Khae District
- Country: Thailand
- Province: Bangkok
- Khet: Bang Khae

Area
  - Total: 11.240 km^{2} (4.340 sq mi)

Population (2016)
  - Total: 52,144
- Time zone: UTC+7 (ICT)
- Postal code: 10160
- TIS 1099: 104004

Lak Song (Thai: หลักสอง, pronounced [làk sɔ̌ːŋ]) is a khwaeng (subdistrict) of Bang Khae district, Bangkok's Thonburi side.

== History ==
Originally, Lak Song was a part of amphoe (district) Nong Khaem, a westernmost of Bangkok. Until 1998, the Ministry of Interior has merged certain areas of Nong Khaem and Phasi Charoen with Bang Khae, which is a newly established district. Since then Lak Song therefore became part of Bang Khae completely.

Its name "Lak Song" meaning "the second milestone", refers to the second milestone of Khlong Phasi Charoen, a canal that flows through the area. It is a canal dug during King Mongkut (Rama IV)'s reign linking Bangkok to Krathum Baen of Samut Sakhon province.

In the nearby area there is a temple named Wat Lak Sam (วัดหลักสาม, "the third milestone temple").

The MRT Blue Line terminal station, Lak Song MRT station, indeed, it is located in the area of Bang Khae Nuea in front of The Mall Bang Khae.

== Geography ==
Lak Song has a total area of 9.25 km^{2} (3.57 mi^{2}), regarded as the south-west part of the district.

Neighbouring subdistricts are (from the north clockwise): Bang Khae Nuea and Bang Khae in its district, Bang Bon Nuea of Bang Bon district, Nong Khaem of Nong Khaem district.

== Demography ==
On August 31, 2016, it had a total population of 52,144 people (24,201 men and 27,943 women) in 23,183 households.

== Places ==
Transportation

- Phet Kasem Road (Thailand Route 4)
- Kanchanaphisek Road (Outer Bangkok Ring Road)
- Khlong Phasi Charoen
- Phetkasem 69 Pier

Important places

- Wat Muang
- Panyaworakun School
- Samnak Poosawan Dharma Retreat
- Victoria Gardens
- Wat Rat Bamrung
