= Wat Ko, Bangkok =

Buddhist temple in Thailand

Coordinates: 13.742973°N 100.456259°E

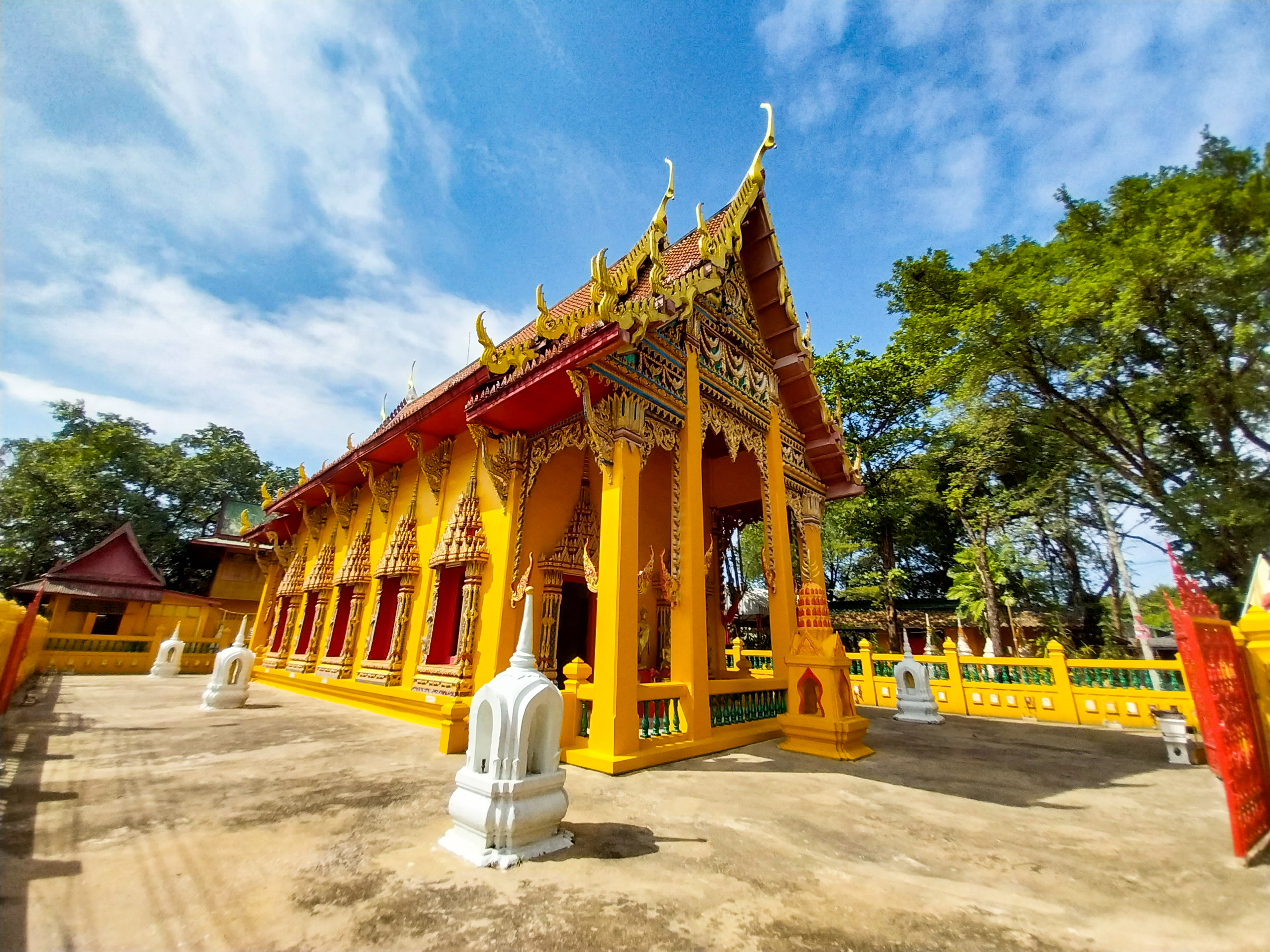
Wat Ko in 2023

Wat Ko (Thai: วัดเกาะ, pronounced [wát kɔ̀ʔ]) is a Buddhist temple of over 320 years old in the area of Bang Chueak Nang Subdistrict, Taling Chan District, Bangkok. The temple was built during the late Ayutthaya period, but the exact builder name is unknown. It is located on a land surrounded by two waterways Khlong Bang Chueak Nang and Khlong Bang Noi, hence the name "Wat Ko", which means "island temple".

This temple is believed to have been built since the late Ayutthaya period, more than 300 years old. The principle Buddha named Luang Pho Dam (หลวงพ่อดำ) that enshrined in the sanctuary Chinese-styled roof.

One of the highlights of this temple is the ancient chedi located on the right side of the sanctuary rim Khlong Bang Noi. There is also a mummified past abbot, that is kept as relic for devotee to pay respect.

Wat Ko is a small and quiet temple, and cannot be reached by car. This temple is the destination of water tourism by long-tail boat from Taling Chan floating market, which is only available on Saturday–Sunday or a holiday only.
