= Bang Phai, Bangkok =

Coordinates: 13°44′10.2″N 100°22′51.0″E

Bang Phai บางไผ่
- Khwaeng
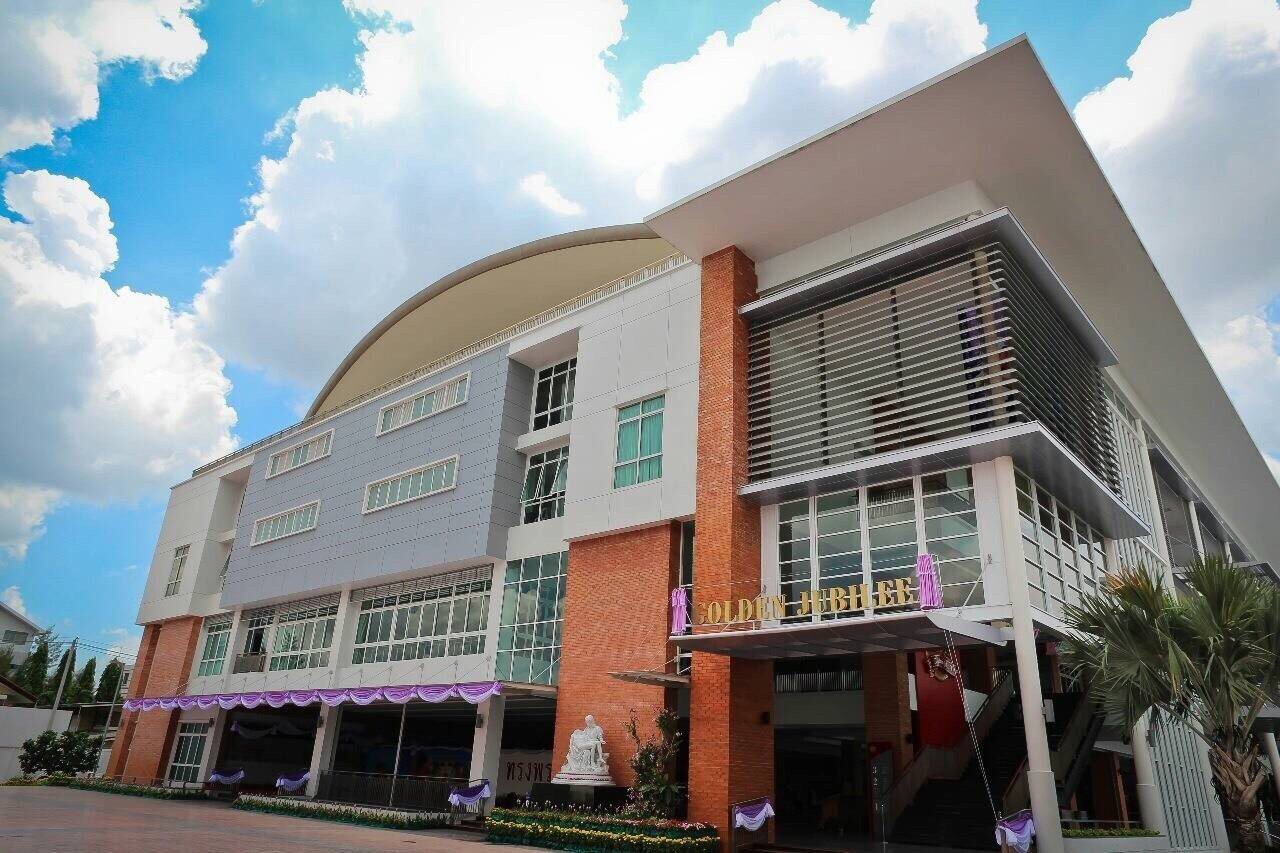
- Assumption College Thonburi

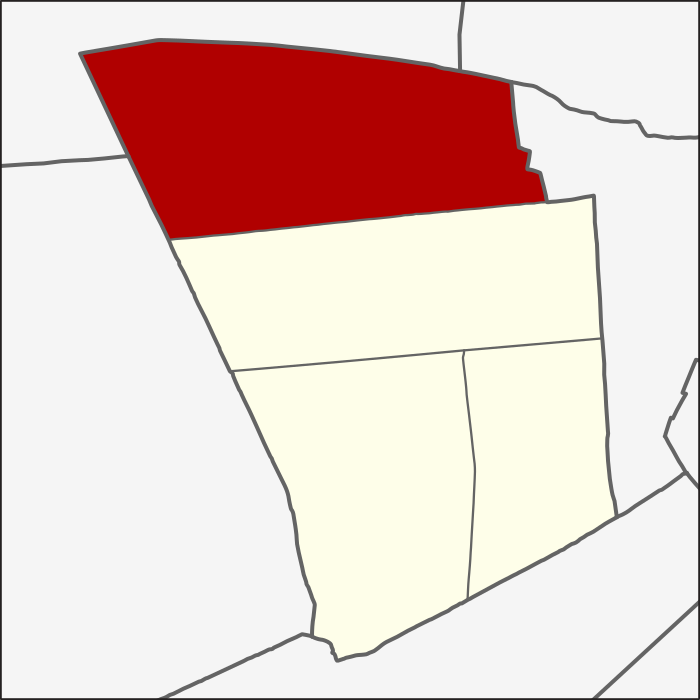
- Location in Bang Khae District
- Country: Thailand
- Province: Bangkok
- Khet: Bang Khae

Area
  - Total: 14.670 km^{2} (5.664 sq mi)

Population (2018)
  - Total: 40,277
- Time zone: UTC+7 (ICT)
- Postal code: 10160
- TIS 1099: 104003

Bang Phai (Thai: บางไผ่, pronounced [bāːŋ pʰàj]) is a khwaeng (subdistrict) of Bang Khae District, Bangkok's Thonburi side.

== History ==
It is named after Khlong Bang Phai, a khlong (canal) that flows through the area. Originally Bang Phai was part of Phasi Charoen District, until the year 1998, Bangkok Metropolitan Administration (BMA) has changed the new administrative district, make Bang Khae become a complete district and Bang Phai became a part of the Bang Khae ever since.

== Geography ==
Neighbouring subdistricts are, clockwise from north: Thawi Watthana in Thawi Watthana District, Bang Chueak Nang in Taling Chan District (Khlong Bang Chueak Nang is a divider line), Khlong Khwang in Phasi Charoen District (Khlong Bang Waek, Khlong Bang Phai, Khlong Lat Taniao, and Khlong Kru Sangiam are divider lines), Bang Khae Nuea in its district (Khlong Bang Waek is a divider line), Nong Khang Phlu in Nong Khaem District, and Thawi Watthana in Thawi Watthana District (Khlong Thawi Watthana is a divider line).

== Economy ==
Bang Phai is considered an area where the majority of the population is still farming. Most of orchid estates in the area of Bang Phai are located on the banks of Khlong Thawi Watthana and Khlong Bang Chueak Nang, every morning the orchids are sent to Pak Khlong Talat and some are exported to different country.

== Places ==
- Wat Bunyapradit
- Wat Sala Daeng
- Sala Daeng Metropolitan Police Station
- Assumption College Thonburi
- Banthongyod Badminton School
- Sarasas Witaed Thonburi School
- Garden Artisans (Suan Sang Dhamma)
