= Wat Chan Pradittharam =

Coordinates: 13.7193°N 100.4413°E

Wat Chan Pradittharam (Thai: วัดจันทร์ประดิษฐาราม) is a Buddhist temple in the Phasi Charoen District of Bangkok, Thailand, by the Thonburi west bank of the Chao Phraya River. The full name of the temple is Wat Chan Pradittharam, named before Wat Chan Pa Khon.

== History ==
Wat Chan Pradittharam is located at No. 27 Moo 2 Soi Phetkasem 48 Road, Bang Duan Phasi Charoen District Bangkok. Wat Chan Pradittharam was built around the year 1828, according to records of the measure, approximately year 1818 during the reign of King Rama II of the Chakri Dynasty. Mr. Chan was a hermit Rich Wealthy Donated the land ownership of the treasure of the Temple 2 deed. This is the reason that the building was named this temple " Wat Chan ascetic ". Later, on 26 December 1958, the temple has made a formal submission to the Ministry requesting the name change was remade as " Wat Chan Pradittharam ".

== Architecture ==
1. The new hall with a second projecting portico column dividing the two sides of Buddha in a temple. Buddha.

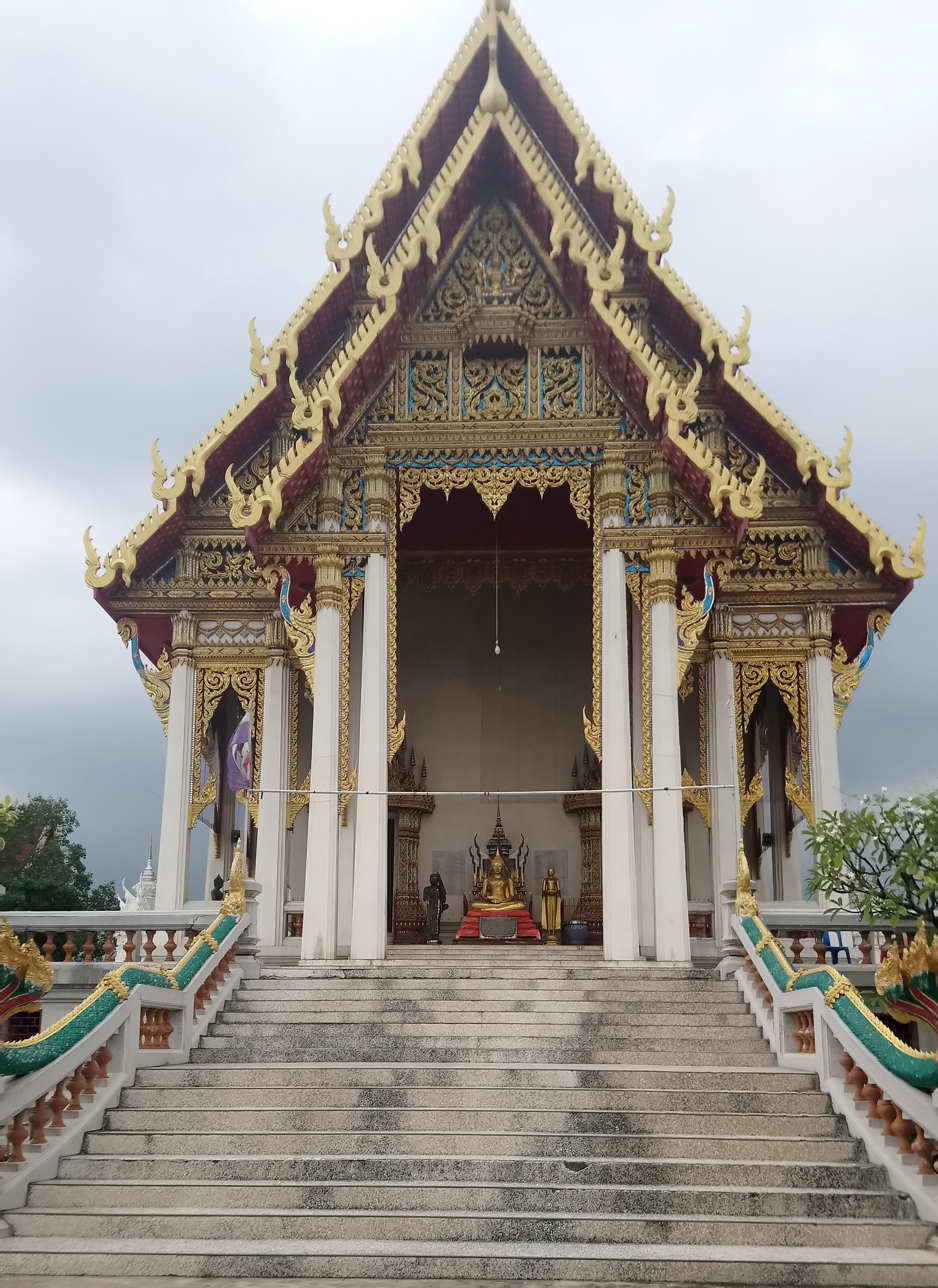
The new hall

2. Pastor white Buddha temple in the Angkor Wat abandoned Kula. During Khlong Bang Phrom, Taling Chan Buddha is built with laterite

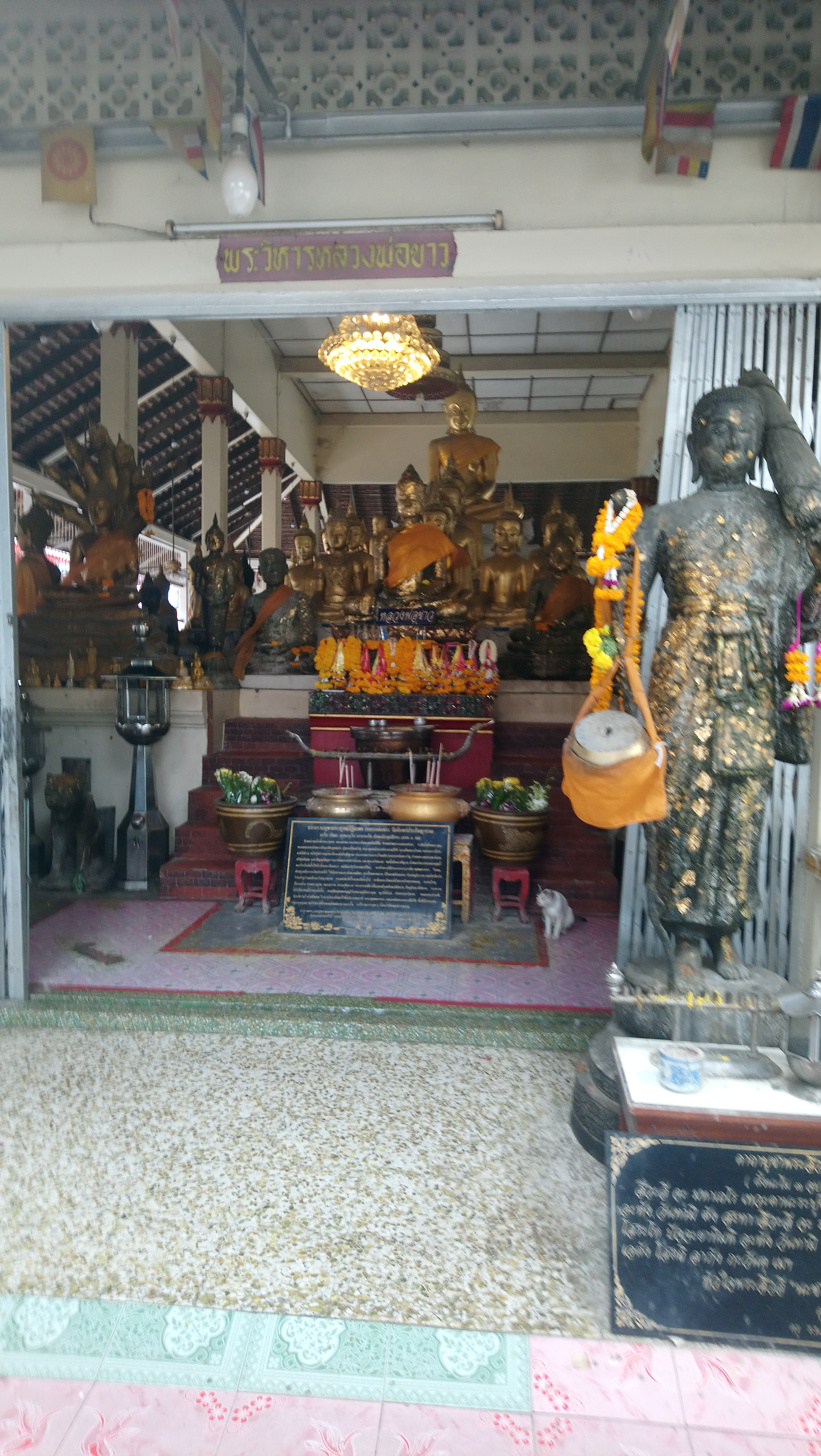
Pastor white

== Layout and construction ==
The general condition of the temple area the canal basin and Lmkraodg area around the temple area near the community of houses with people living in all 4 directions planting a garden, fruits. North, next to the Wat Chan Pradittharam. school (Elementary School).

== Media ==
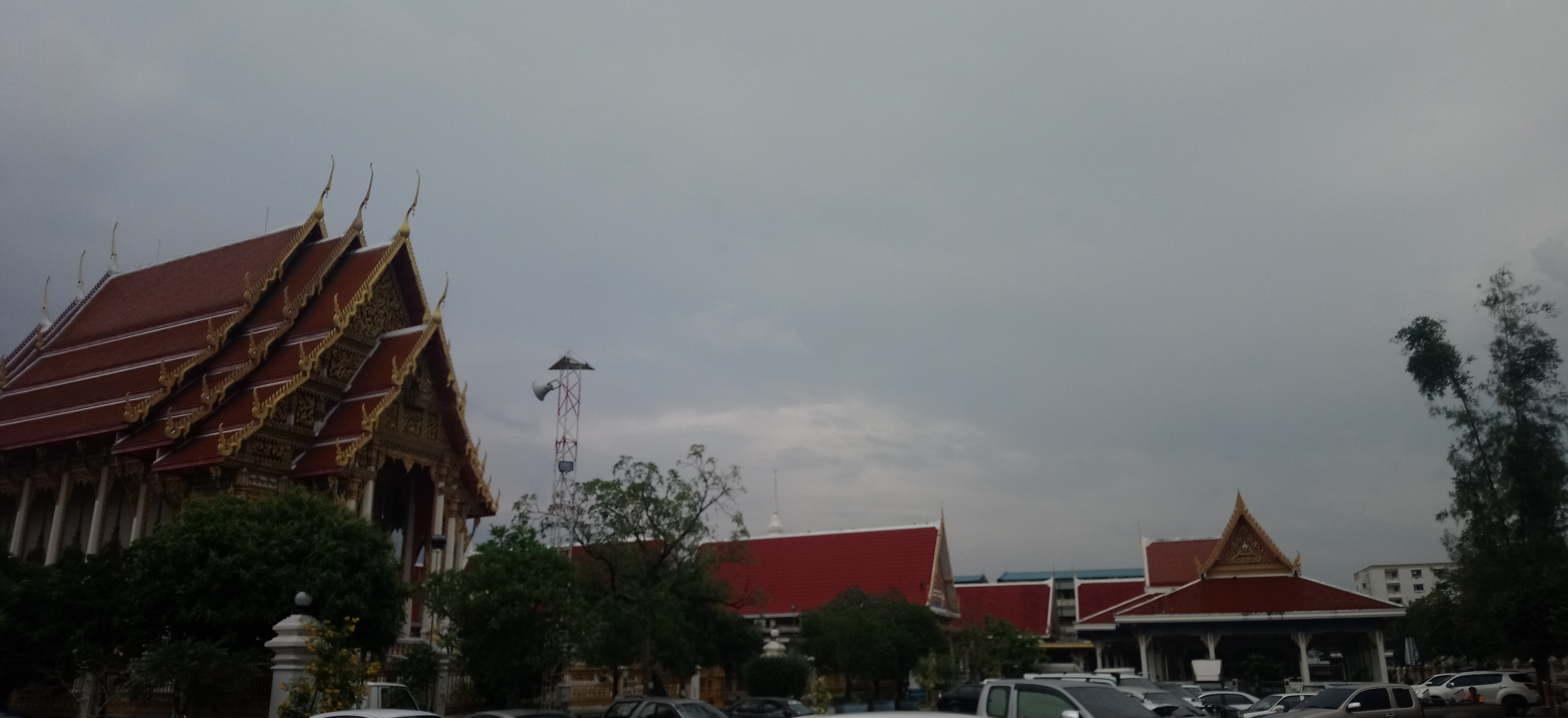
Grandfather and Grand Hall and the White Temple

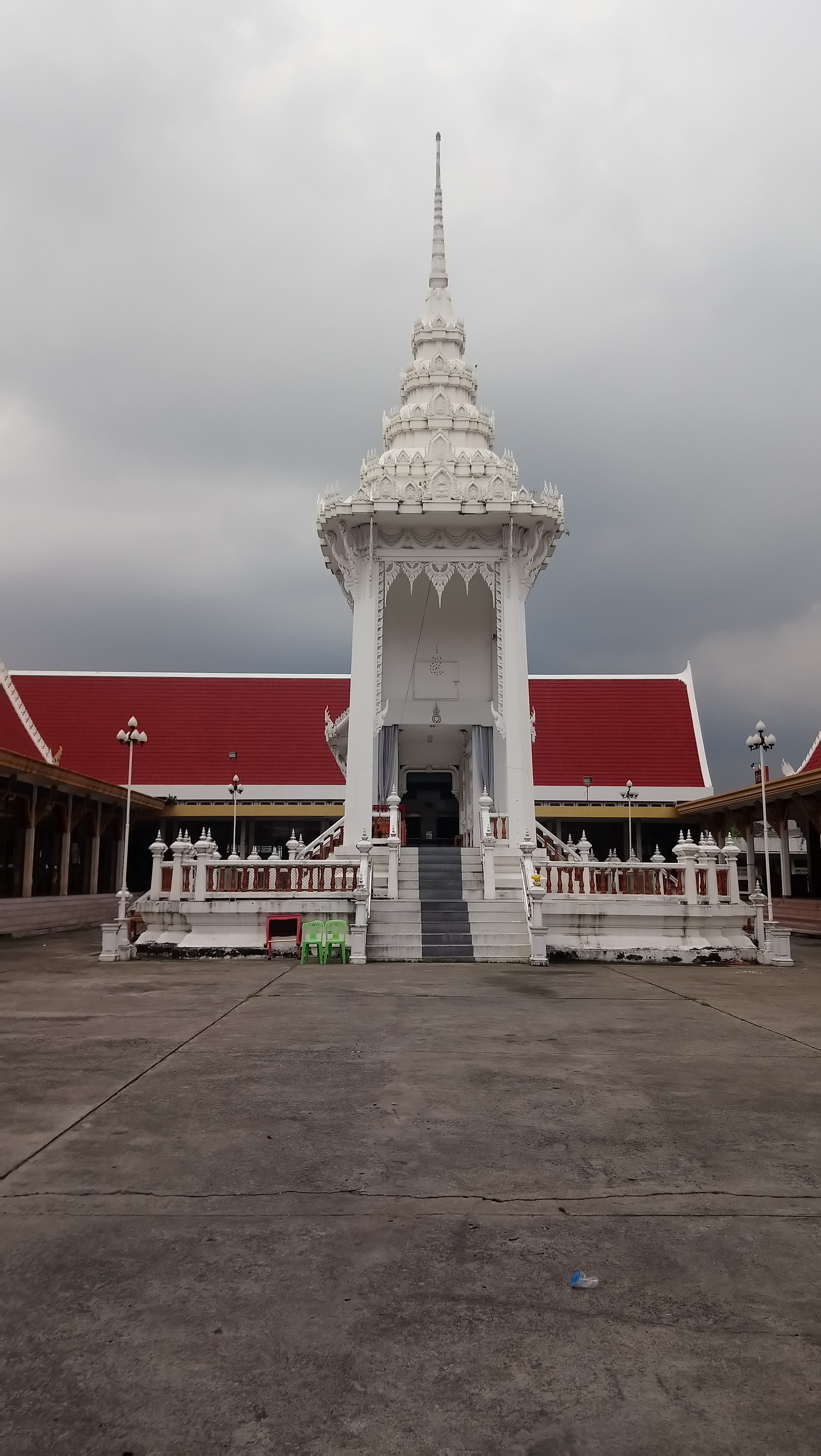
Crematorium

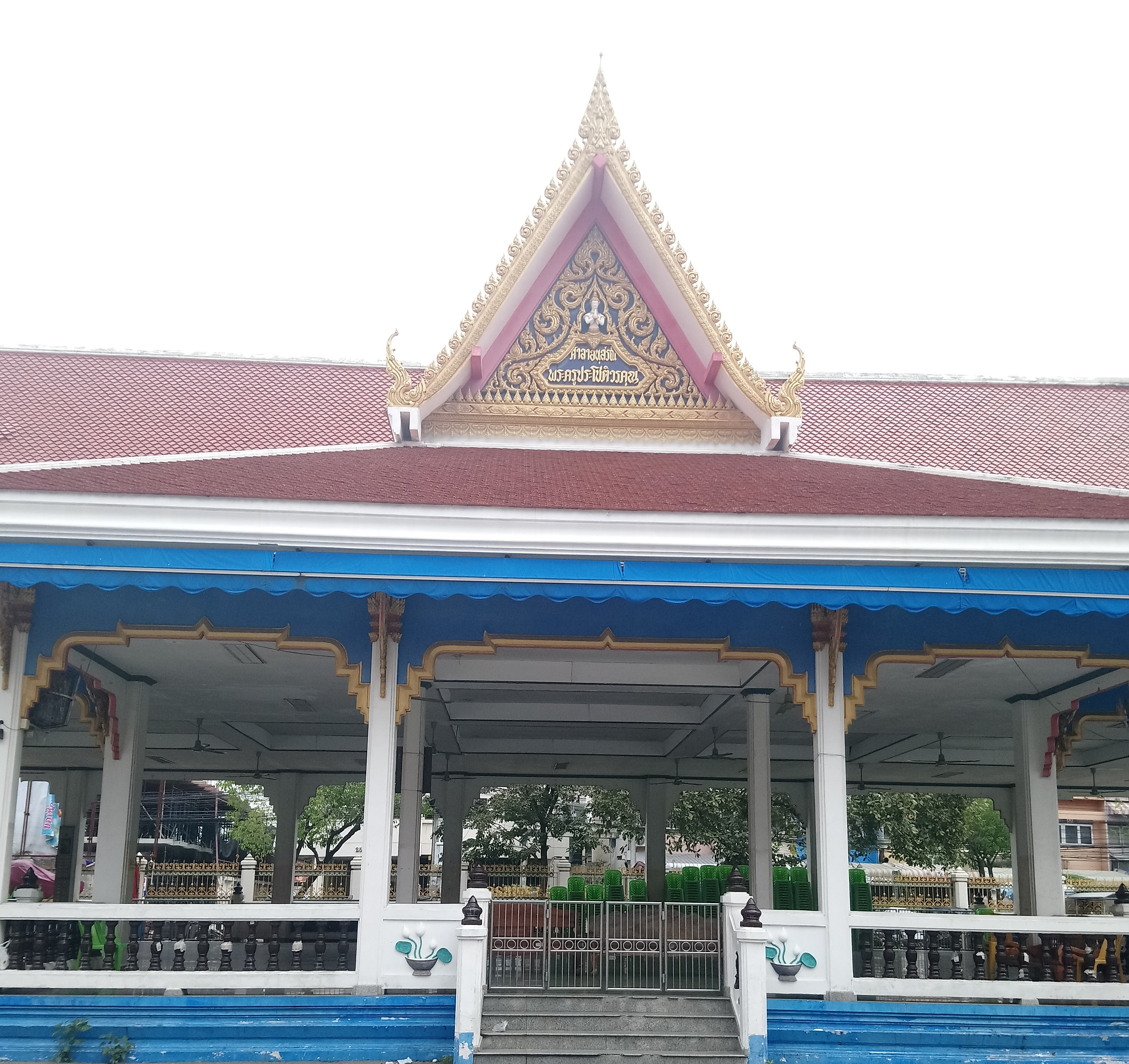
Hall provost of Chote Mr. Anusorn
