= Bang Wa Subdistrict =

Bang Wa บางหว้า
- Khwaeng
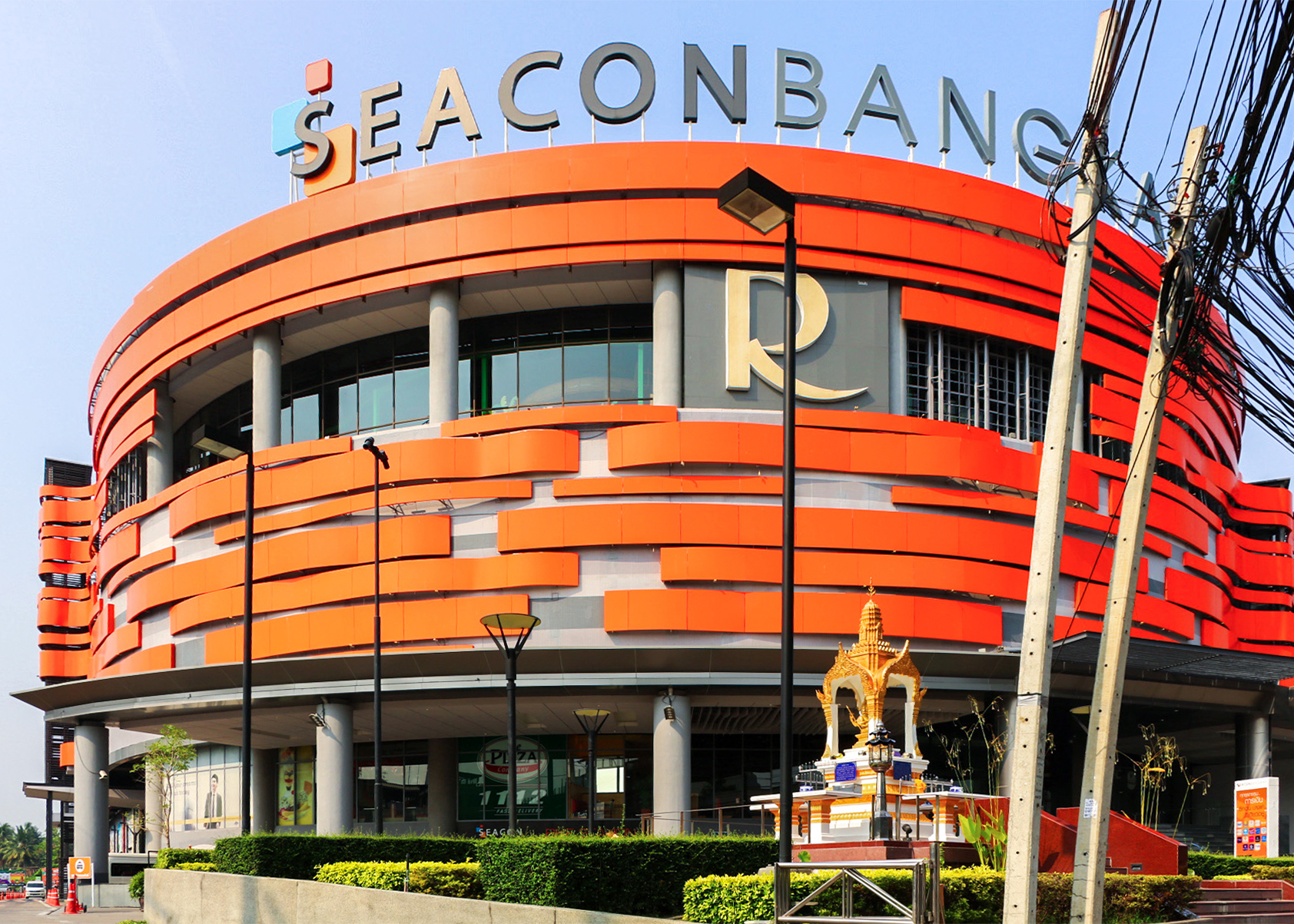
- Seacon Bangkae Mall

- Location in Phasi Charoen District
- Country: Thailand
- Province: Bangkok
- Khet: Phasi Charoen

Area
  - Total: 5.105 km^{2} (1.971 sq mi)

Population (2023)
  - Total: 38,106
- Time zone: UTC+7 (ICT)
- Postal code: 10160
- TIS 1099: 102201

Bang Wa (Thai: บางหว้า, pronounced [baːŋ wâː]) is a khwaeng (subdistrict) in Phasi Charoen District, Bangkok. In 2023, it had a population of 38,106 people.
