= Khlong Thawi Watthana =

Canal in Bangkok, Thailand

Coordinates: 13.803889°N 100.327778°E

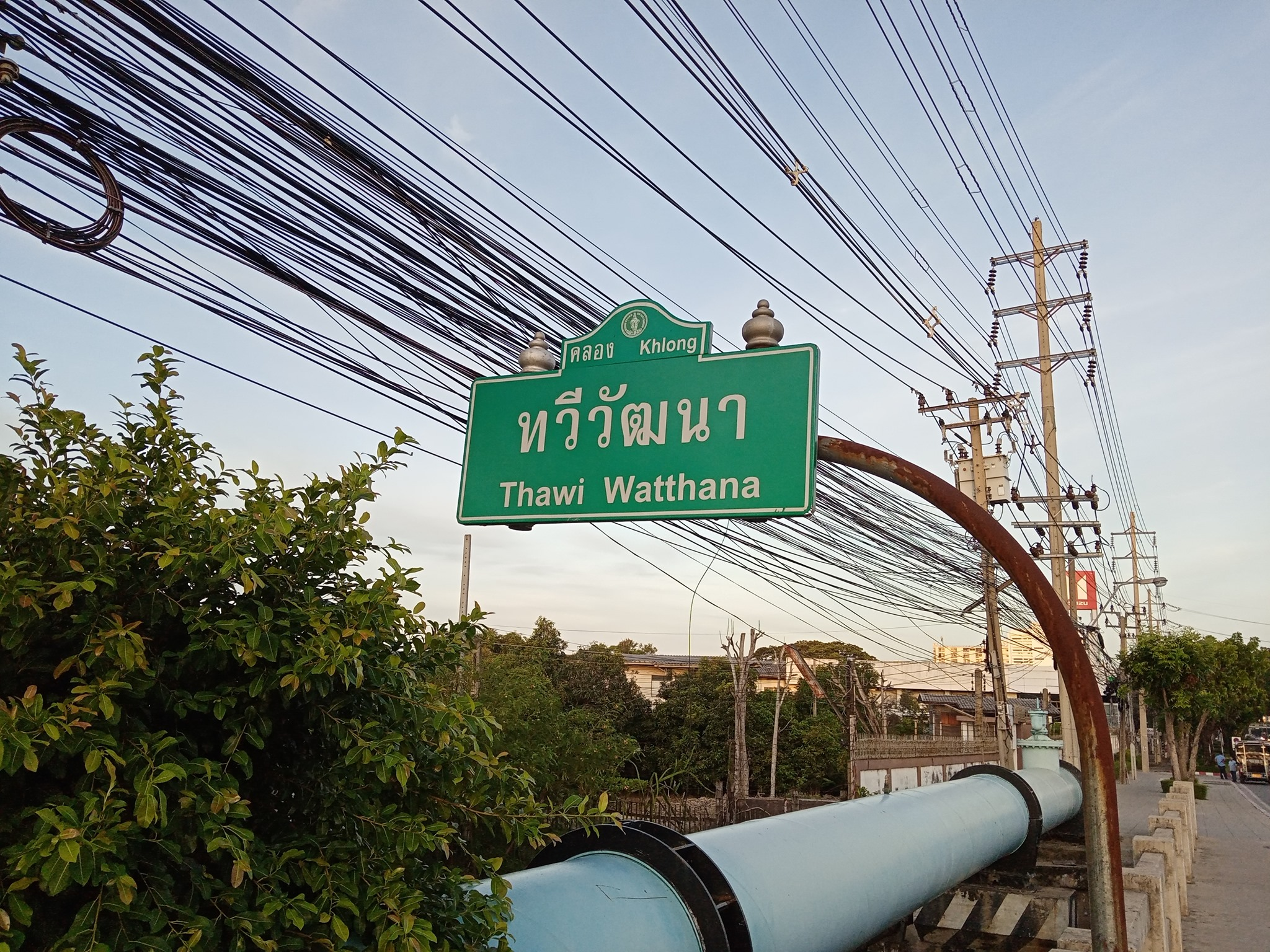
- Khlong Thawi Watthana name sign.
- Interactive map of Khlong Thawi Watthana

Specifications
- Length: 35.2 km (21.9 miles)

History
- Construction began: 1868
- Date completed: 1910

Geography
- Start point: Bangkok
- End point: Nakhon Pathom
- Connects to: Khlong Phasi Charoen, Tha Chin River

Khlong Thawi Watthana (Thai: คลองทวีวัฒนา, pronounced [kʰlɔːŋ tʰaː.wiː wat.tʰaː.naː]) is one main khlong (canal) in Thonburi side of Bangok (west side of Chao Phraya River). Its name is the origin name of Thawi Watthana District.

Khlong Thawi Watthana was dug in mid-Rattanakosin period, during 1868–1910 along with Khlong Nara Phirom (คลองนราภิรมย์–this name is used to refer to the part of the khlong in the areas of Nonthaburi and Nakhon Pathom Provinces). King Chulalongkorn (Rama V) graciously assigned Phraya Surawongse Wai Yawat (Worn Bunnag), the eldest son of Somdet Chaophraya Sri Suriwongse (Chuang Bunnag), to be the director of the khlong excavation, and the Chinese workmen were hired. It started from the north of Khlong Phasi Charoen on the boundary of Bang Khae and Nong Khaem Districts in present day, passed through Khlong Maha Sawat, as far as the end at Tha Chin River in Bang Len District of Nakhon Pathom Province, with the distance of 35.2 km (21.9 mi)

The purpose of this excavation, was to correct the shallowness of Khlong Maha Sawat and Khlong Phasi Charoen, including to increase the areas for cultivation on the banks of the khlong amount 10,880 acres. Khlong Thawi Watthana also flows through other khlongs in a way that obstructs. Hence, people therefore colloquially those areas as "Khlong Khwang" (คลองขวาง, lit. 'impeded canal') according to its course.

Khlong Thawi Watthana currents passing through the area of Thawi Watthana District, which is an administration area of Bangkok, and it has been separated from Taling Chan District since March 6, 1998.

The areas along both sides of khlong are orchards, paddy fields, and also having rotary cultivations all year round, such as lotus plantations, paddy fields, vegetable gardens, orchards, flowering plant farms, decorative plant of farms. The kind of flowering plants which made a credit to Khlong Thawi Watthana is orchids.

The interesting places nearby Khlong Thawi Watthana are as follows, group of phuang malai (Thai floral garland) that was made from earth of jasmine's fragrance, it was set up to teach phuang malais's elaboration, and Thai handicrafts with earth of jasmine's fragrance, Thonburi Market, also known as Sanam Luang 2, the weekend flea market of various goods, such as agricultural equipments, ornamental plants, aquarium fish, similar to Chatuchak Weekend Market in the downtown, as well as Tawee Wattana Palace, the resident of King Vajiralongkorn (Rama X), the present King of Thailand, etc.

Thawi Watthana Road, formerly and colloquially known as Liab Khlong Thawi Watthana Road, is a road approximately 10 km (6.2 mi) in length. It runs parallel to the western side of Khlong Thawi Watthana, passing through Nong Khaem District and Thawi Watthana District. The road intersects with Aksa Road near the area close to Thawi Watthana Palace. This road (including Aksa Road and nearby Phutta Monthon Sai 3 Road) is also one of the popular areas in Bangkok for water-splashing activities during the Songkran Festival (April 13–15). However, due to its proximity to the royal residence and resulting security concerns, as well as traffic disruptions caused by road closures, there are frequent debates almost every year regarding whether Songkran celebrations should be permitted in this area.
