= Lak Song MRT station =

Metro station in Bangkok, Thailand

Coordinates: 13.7108°N 100.4095°E

หลักสอง Lak Song
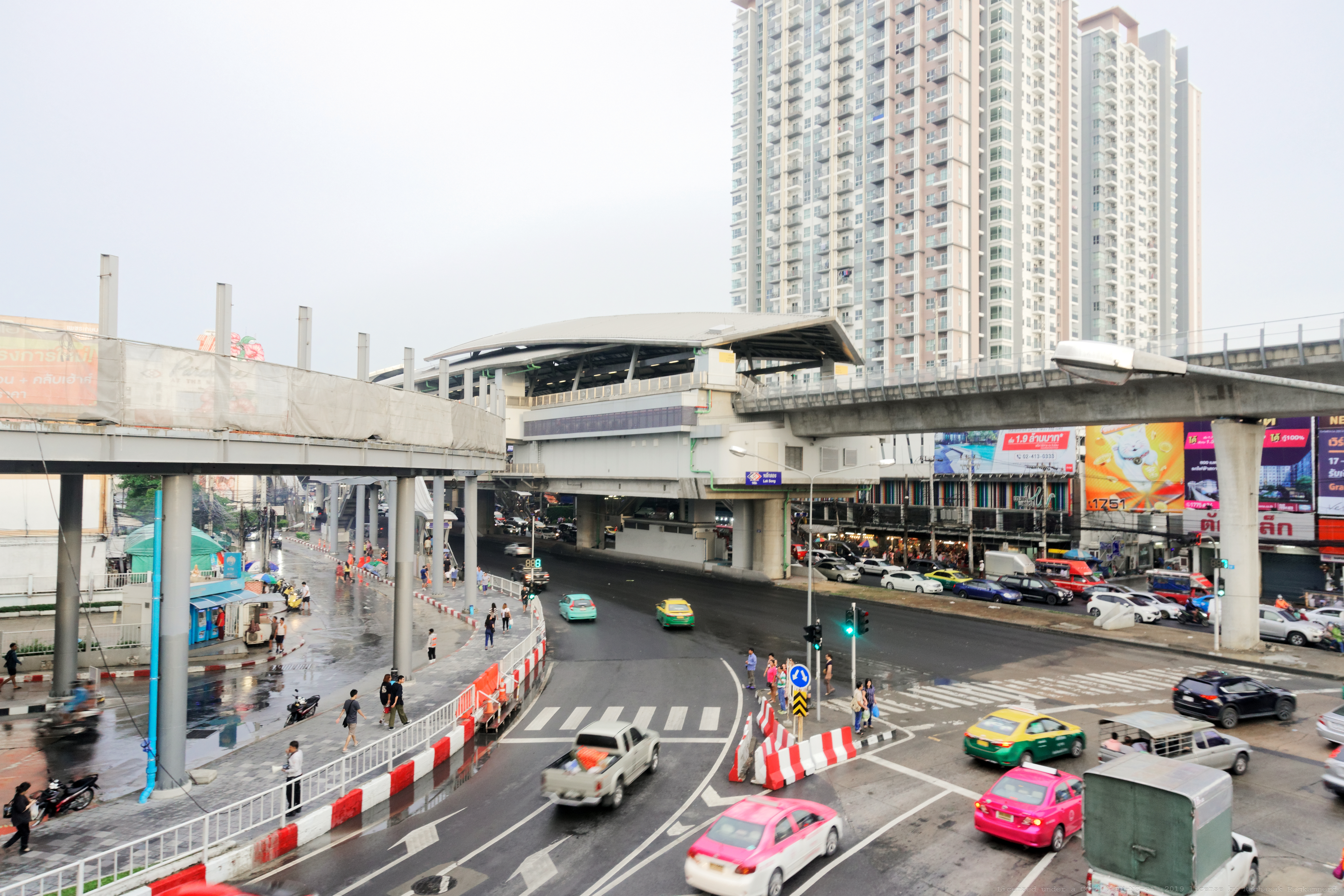
- Lak Song MRT station seen from footbridge of The Mall Lifestore Bang Khae

General information
- Location: Bang Khae and Bang Khae Nuea, Bang Khae, Bangkok, Thailand
- System: MRT
- Owner: Mass Rapid Transit Authority of Thailand (MRTA)
- Operator: Bangkok Expressway and Metro Public Company Limited (BEM)
- Line: Blue Line
- Platforms: 2 side platforms
- Tracks: 2

Construction
- Structure type: Elevated
- Parking: Yes

Other information
- Station code: BL38

History
- Opened: 21 September 2019; 7 years ago
- Electrified: Third rail

Passengers
- 2021: 3,989,684

Services
| Preceding station | Metropolitan Rapid Transit | Following station |
|---|---|---|
| Terminus | Blue Line | Bang Khae towards Tha Phra |
Location
- Location within Bangkok Location within Bangkok Metropolitan Region

Lak Song station (Thai: สถานีหลักสอง, pronounced [sā.tʰǎː.nīː làk sɔ̌ːŋ]; code BL38) is an elevated MRT Blue Line station opened on 21 September 2019. The station serves as one of the two terminuses (The other being Tha Phra MRT station) of the line. The station is located on Phet–Kanchana Junction where Phet Kasem Road intersects Kanchanaphisek Road.

== Station details ==
Lak Song station use side platforms layout. Being a terminal station, only one platform will be used at a time. Trains from Tha Phra entering one of the two platforms before leaving for service back to Tha Phra from the same platform. Unused platform will be blocked off. The station has four exits.

The station bridged to nearby shopping mall The Mall Lifestore Bangkae by elevated walkway.

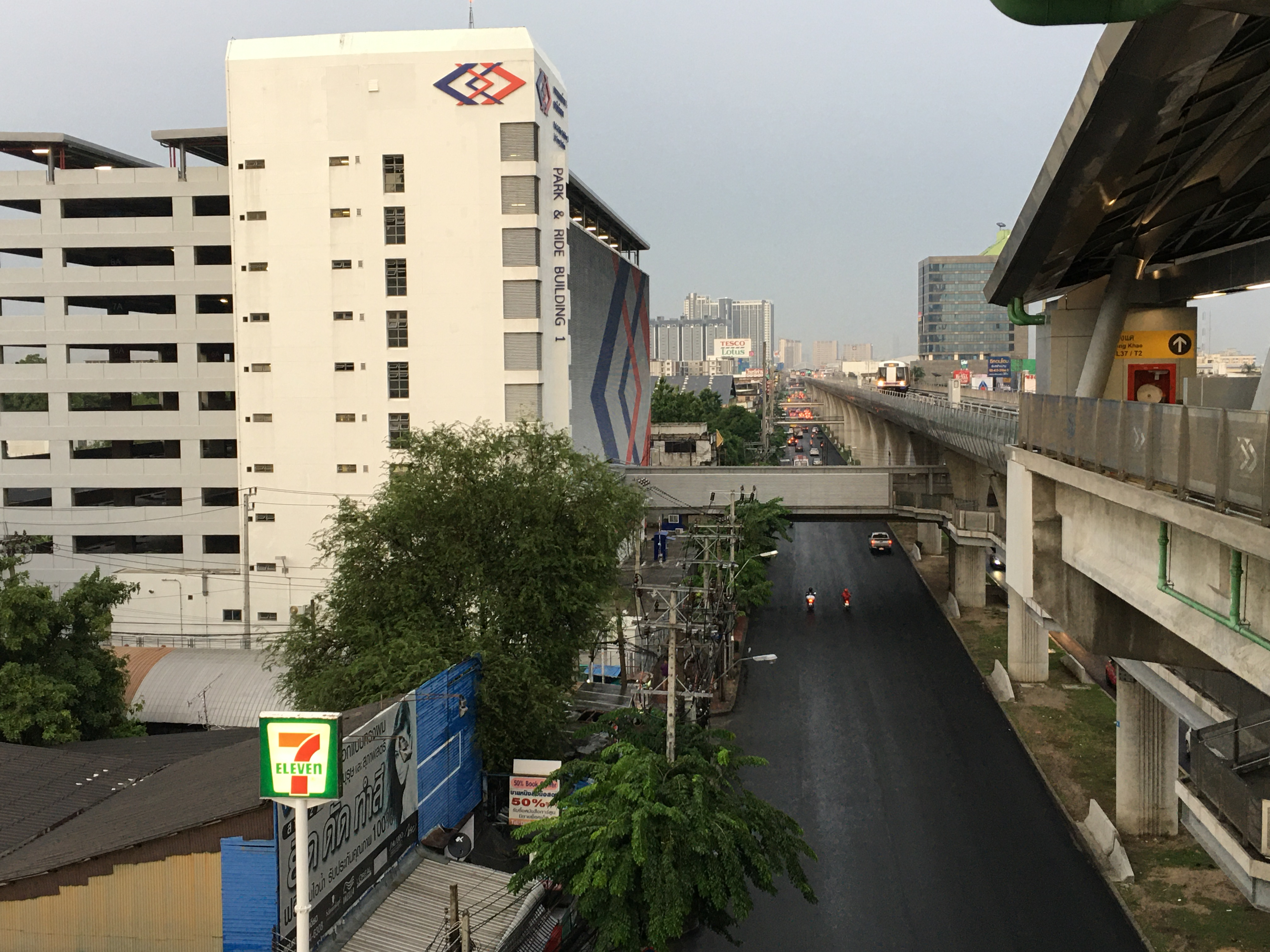
Train from Bang Khae station crossing to the eastbound track near Park and Ride building and approaching platform no.2

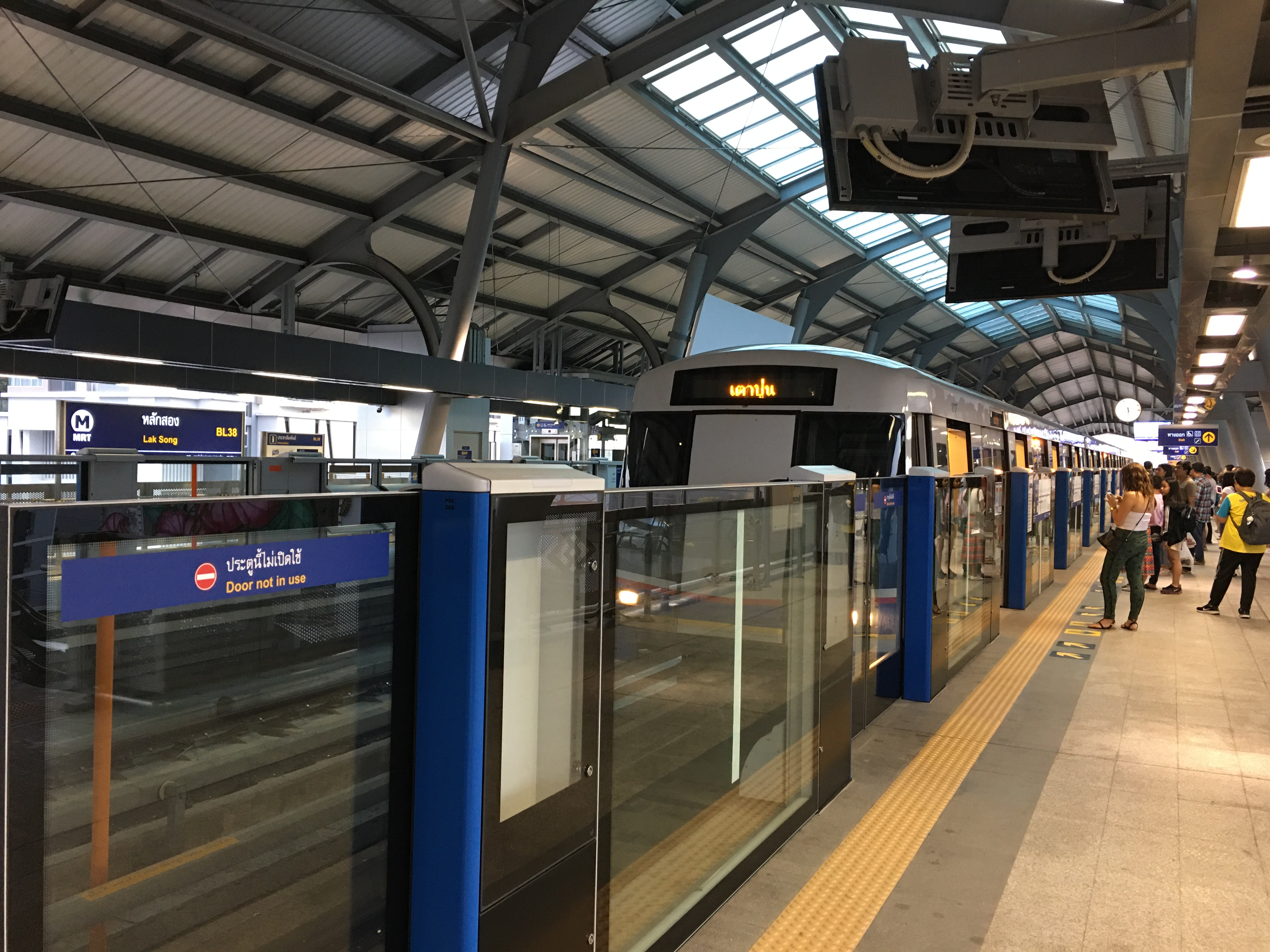
After the train stops at platform no.2 and all passengers alight, Staff will check the train before heading towards Tha Phra

== Park and Ride ==
Park and Ride at Lak Song station consist of one eight-floor and one ten-floor buildings on both side of Phet Kasem Road. Both buildings are connected via car overpass, allowing cars to enter and exit the building on any side of the road.
