= Bang Khae district =

Bang Khae บางแค
- Khet
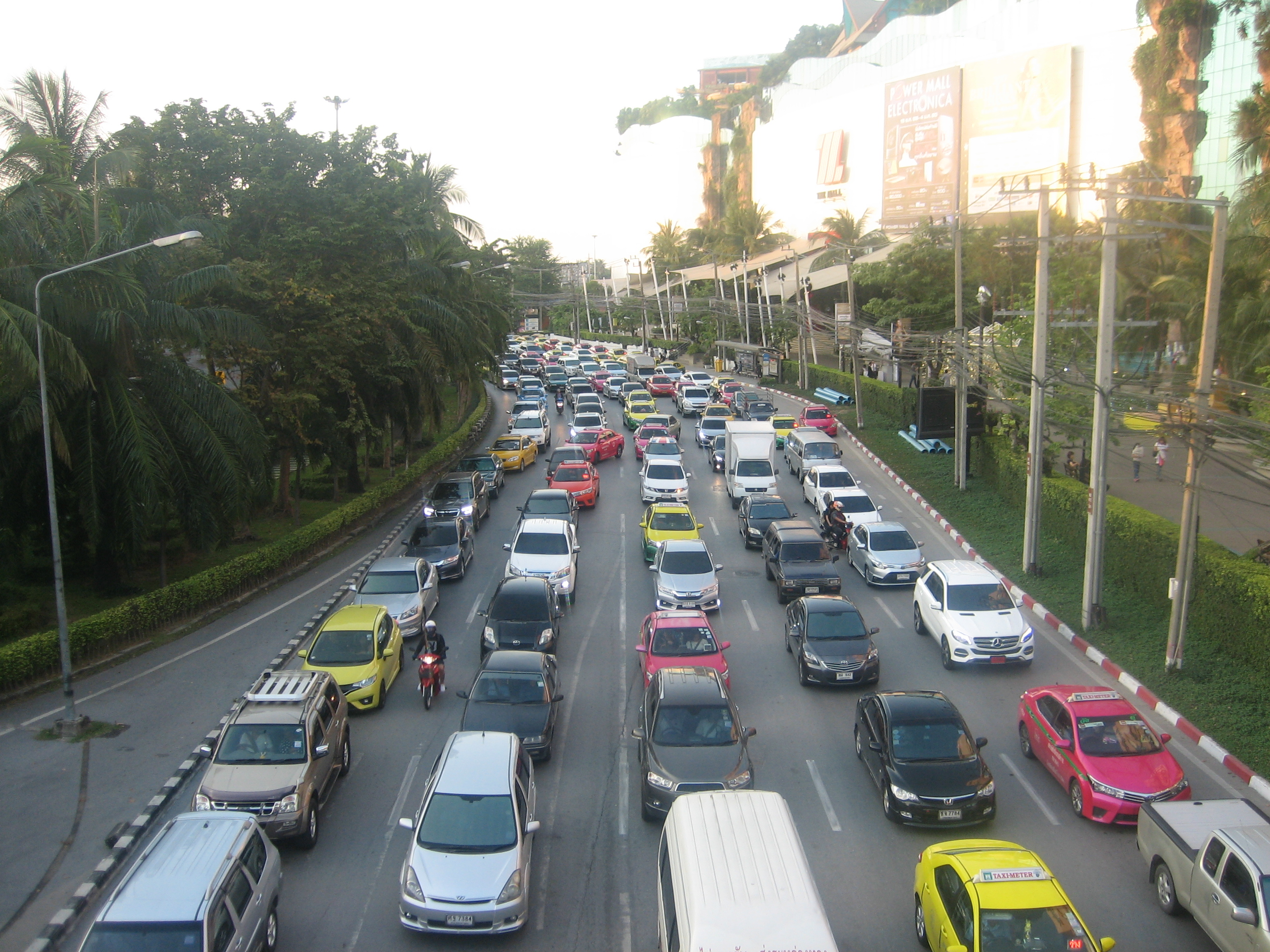
- Traffic jam on Kanchanaphisek Road beside of The Mall Bang Khae

- Khet location in Bangkok
- Coordinates: 13°41′46″N 100°24′34″E
- Country: Thailand
- Province: Bangkok
- Seat: Bang Khae
- Khet established: 6 March 1998

Area
  - Total: 44.456 km^{2} (17.165 sq mi)

Population (2017)
  - Total: 193,002
  - Density: 4,341.41/km^{2} (11,244.2/sq mi)
- Time zone: UTC+7 (ICT)
- Postal code: 10160
- Geocode: 1040

Bang Khae (Thai: บางแค, pronounced [bāːŋ kʰɛ̄ː]) is one of the 50 districts (khet) of Bangkok, Thailand. Its neighbouring districts, clockwise from north, are Thawi Watthana, Taling Chan, Phasi Charoen, Bang Bon, and Nong Khaem district.

== History ==
From 6 March 1998, Phasi Charoen Sakha 1 district was combined with Lak Song sub-district, formerly part of Nong Khaem District, to form a new district, called Khet Bang Khae. The sub-districts of the new Bang Khae district then consisted of Bang Khae, Bang Khae Nuea, Bang Phai and Lak Song.

Together with the creation of the district, the four sub-districts of Bang Khae were reorganised for administrative purposes. In 2009 the subdistrict boundaries were adjusted again.

Its name means "county of the hummingbird tree", likely referring to the past abundance of this plant in the area.

== Administration ==
The district is divided into four sub-districts (khwaeng).

No.	Name	Thai	Area (km^{2})	Map
1.	Bang Khae	บางแค	6.486	แผนที่
2.	Bang Khae Nuea	บางแคเหนือ	12.060	แผนที่
3.	Bang Phai	บางไผ่	14.670	แผนที่
4.	Lak Song	หลักสอง	11.240	แผนที่
Total			44.456	แผนที่
