= Khlong Lat Mayom Floating Market =

Market in Bangkok, Thailand

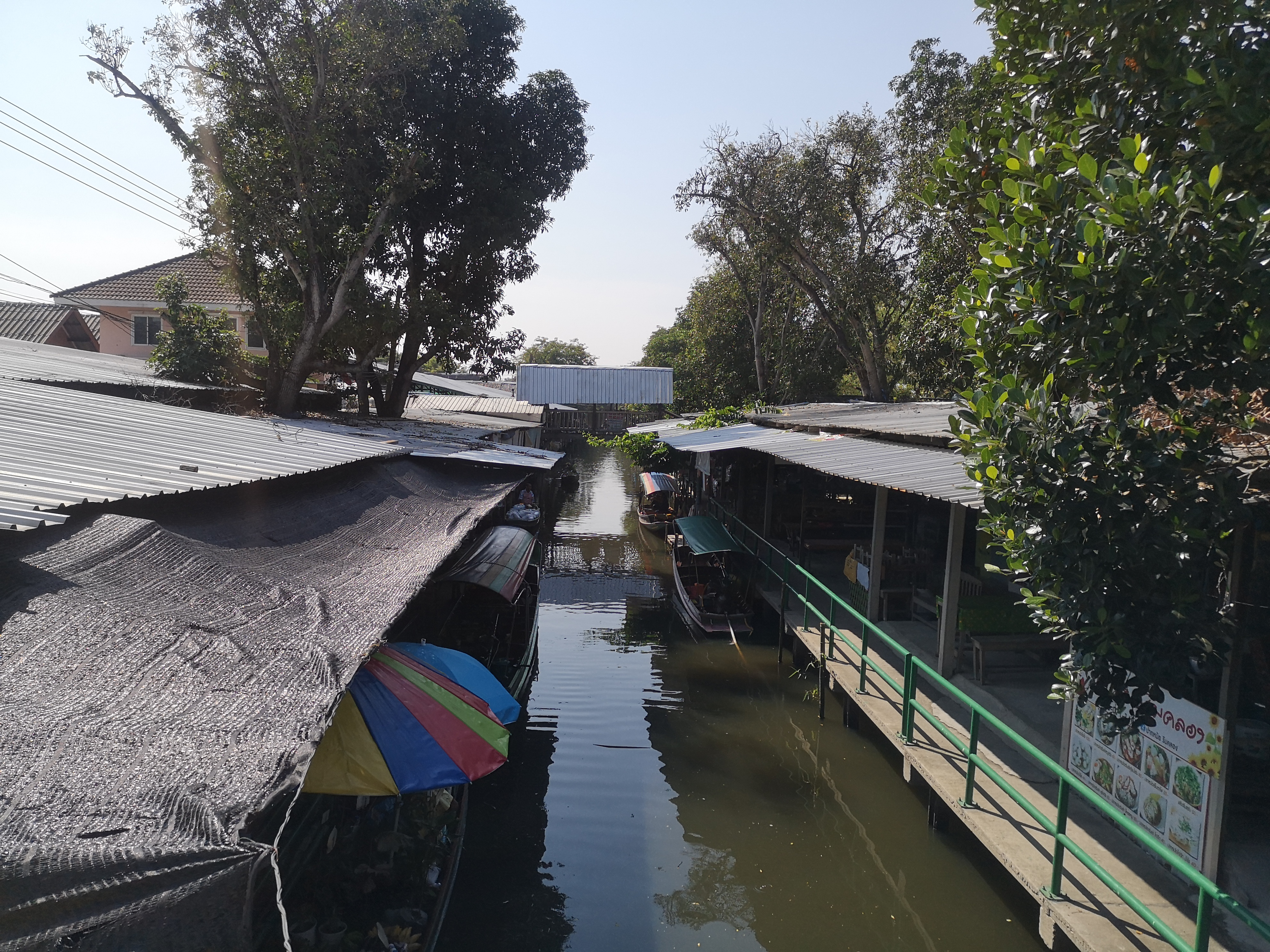
- Location: Bang Ramat Rd, Bang Ramat Subdistrict, Taling Chan District, Bangkok, Thailand; 13°45′42.7″N 100°24′56.09″E
- Opening date: 20 November 2004
- Owner: Chaun Chujan
- Environment: Floating Market
- Interactive map of Khlong Lat Mayom Floating Market

Khlong Lat Mayom Floating Market (Thai: ตลาดน้ำคลองลัดมะยม, pronounced [tā.làːt náːm kʰlɔ̄ːŋ lát mā.jōm]) is a floating market of Taling Chan District, Bangkok apart from Taling Chan and Wat Saphan Floating Markets.

It is located on Bang Ramat Rd, Bang Ramat Subdistrict, Taling Chan District in Thonburi side, the market founded by Chuan Chuchan, a local farmer with the development of plantations and communities of villagers into new market and attraction since November 2004.

Highlights of this market were variety of Thai food such as grilled seafood, kai yang (Thai grilled chicken), som tam (papaya spicy sour salad), larb (Lao meat salad), pork satay, barbeque pork ribs and Thai sweets which many are rare dishes namely khanom khai pla (fish roe sweet), khanom ko (southern Thai sweet), khanom nim nuan (Rayong local sweet), etc. by customers who sit at low tables all along the khlong (canal).

== History ==
=== Origin ===
During the Ayuddhaya period, the Taling Chan (Thai: ตลิ่งชัน) area was a fertile space with rich soil and numerous rivers flowing through it, making it ideal for fruit plantations. The local people, therefore, changed their farming system to a raised-bed garden, which can maintain hydration and slow down water erosion during the drought and flood season. The community had its own unique characteristics, known as "gardener culture along with the self-reliant occupations and strong family relationships.

=== Development of the floating market ===
This area was characterized by a lowland area and numerous rivers like a net. The main canals in the Taling Chan district flow parallel in a west-east direction, in order of Khlong Mahasawat, Khlong Bang Ramat, Khlong Bang Phrom, Khlong Bang Noi, and Khlong Bang Chueak Nang.

Nowadays, the market is located on the Taling Chan - Bang Ramat Road, which is located on the western side of the old Chao Phraya River. Currently, the market’s river is called Khlong Bangkok Noi, connecting to Khlong Chak Phra and Khlong Bangkok Yai.

During 1995, the waterside lifestyle was changed according to the encroachment of urban society by both construction and new roads, which came with the deterioration of the river and agricultural areas, causing the villagers to abandon their farming careers and turn to selling their land to housing development companies. The higher value of capital was the obstacle for the farmer who faced unpredictable income, resulting in the new accommodation of a new career to achieve greater income.

Khlong Lat Mayom was initiated by Chuan Chuchan, the community leader, followed by the current Chairman of the Khlong Lat Mayom Water Market Committee in 2004. Chuan used to live in the Bang Ramat society as a general farmer. However, there was a change in water levels in the area, and villagers stopped farming and started gardening instead. Until the change in 1995, the once clean canal was now filled with garbage.

After the garbage incident, Chuan conceived the idea of finding a way to preserve the area and sustainably preserve the way of water life of the community around Khlong Lat Mayom. There was cooperation among the community members, with volunteers collecting trash in the canal, along with planting trees and clearing grass. Mostly, the activities will occur on the occasion of celebrating Her Majesty Queen Sirikit's birthday. But the canal, without these ongoing activities, was not effective enough to convince the people to conserve the canal’s cleanliness in the long term.

The community was willing to raise awareness of the importance of preserving the canal in the long term. Therefore, Intensive activities such as cleaning cannot be carried out frequently. Despite Chaun, the community leader had announced the idea of creating a floating market, as it is an ongoing activity that connects the people with the canal. The floating market was officially opened on 20 November 2004. Only about 20 locals were utilizing their front yards for Zone 1. It was using Aunt Chanai Kaochareon's land for Zone 2.

== Layout and attraction ==
The Khlong Lat Mayom floating market features a variety of local foods and traditional Thai dessert, selling many types of interesting goods, including clothes, handicrafts, local products, antiques, kid toys, home decorations, ornamental plants, fresh fruits and vegetables as well as fish spa therapy. Khlong Lat Mayom is also identified as the sole natural park in Bangkok. Generally, the market is separated into the main 7 zones and 404 stalls:

There are 111 stalls in zone 1. The items sold here are Thai traditional desserts, beverages, local fruit, clothes and accessories, and utensils.

Zone 2 offers a variety of food, traditional desserts, local fruit, and vegetables with 78 stalls in its zone.

The products sold in Zone 3 are clothes, accessories, souvenirs, vegetables, trees, and flowers. With 53 stalls for visitors to pick from.

The 66 stalls in zone 4 mainly sell food, beverages, and traditional Thai desserts.

The 5th zone can be referred to as an art market with a huge collection of coloring kits, clay flowers, incense, and fragrances.

Most food stores can be found within the 6th zone, with a huge range of 44 stalls to stop by. Thai traditional dishes, along with fresh beverages and desserts, are available to be served order-to-order.

The handmade souvenirs, including bags, toys, and accessories, along with the variety of plantation mostly sold in the 7th zone, with the available store having up to 20 stalls.

Each zone represents a different type of local store, showcasing its unique identity. The community puts effort into developing local creative products. It has been well-known since the beginning phase of the market.

One of the long-established vendors in Zone 1 is Uncle Chuan’s Ice Cream, a family-run shop founded in 2004 by residents Chuan and Sai Bua. The family operates a coconut farm and has developed the business to add value to their produce by creating coconut-based desserts and beverages, such as coconut ice cream, coconut milk jelly, and burnt coconut drink. The shop is known for its ice cream made with a variety of Thai fruit flavors, including jackfruit, longan, taro, lime, passion fruit, and mango.

== Activity ==
Visitors can take a boat from here to connect to the other two floating markets of Taling Chan, with can see the scenery on both sides of the khlong as well.

Boat tours at Khlong Lat Mayom floating market are available for visitors, providing an overview of local waterways and community life. The boat will take people around to learn about the community and how the locals live. Another activity to do is food tasting. Khlong Lat Mayom floating market offers a variety of food made with local ingredients. For example, Uncle Chuan's ice cream offers a variety of flavors made with local ingredients. The market not only provides local food but also a wide variety of foods.

== Transportation ==
Khlong Lat Mayom Floating Market is operated only on Saturdays–Sundays and public holidays from 9:00 am to 5:00 pm.

Can be reached in addition to boating along the khlong, also take a songthaew (Thai-style minibus) from Siriraj Piyamaharajkarun Hospital for an eight baht fare.

The Khlong Lat Mayom floating market is accessible by MRT, BTS, and local bus routes.

=== MRT ===
Take the MRT to Bang Khun Non Station, and there will be a free shuttle bus to Khlong Lat Mayom floating market.

=== Bus ===
Ride the 146 line bus.
