= Bang Ramat =

Subdistrict in Bangkok, Thailand

Coordinates: 13°46′08.7″N 100°25′30.9″E

Bang Ramat บางระมาด
- Khwaeng
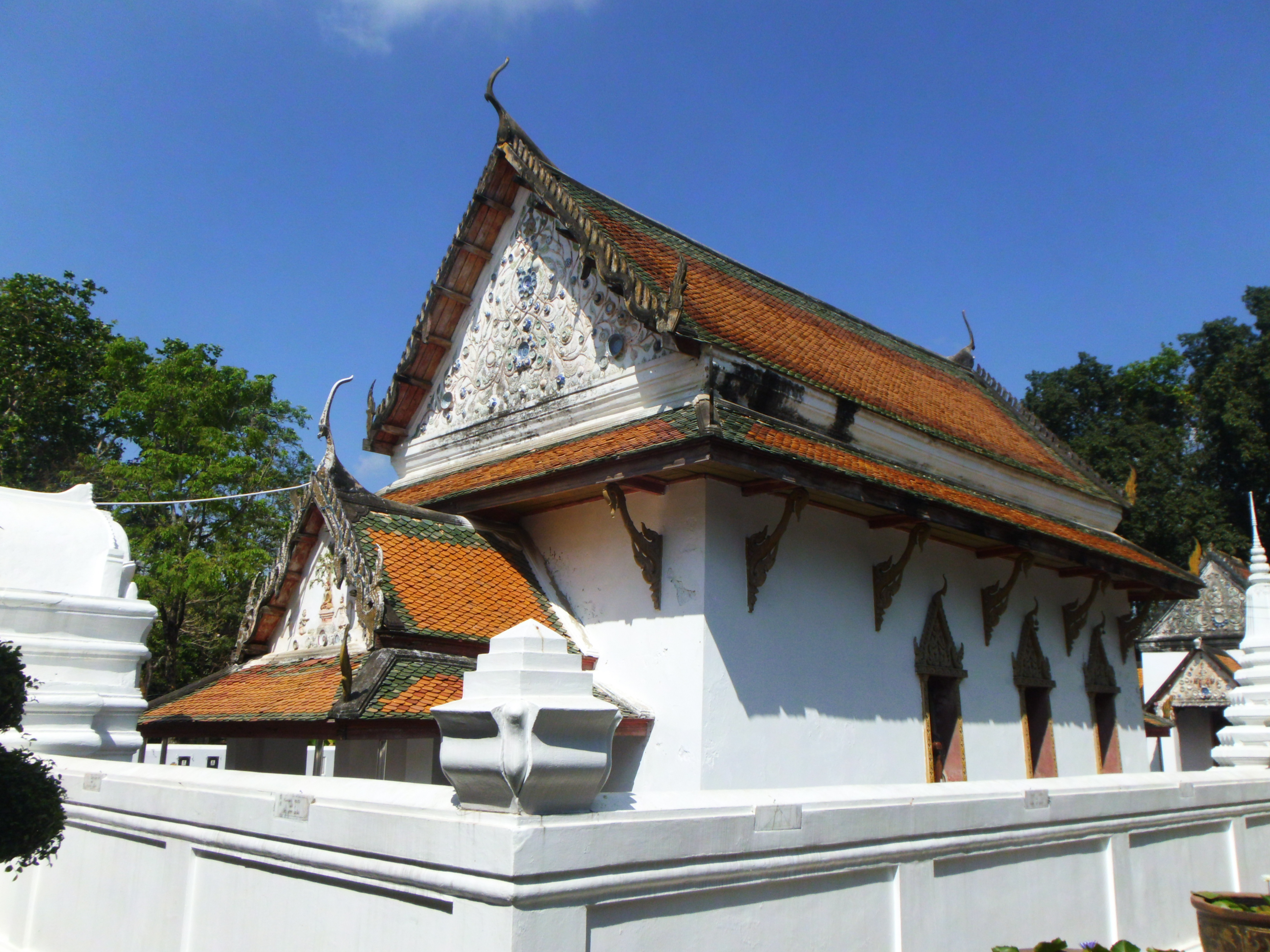
- Wat Champa, a temple in the subdistrict

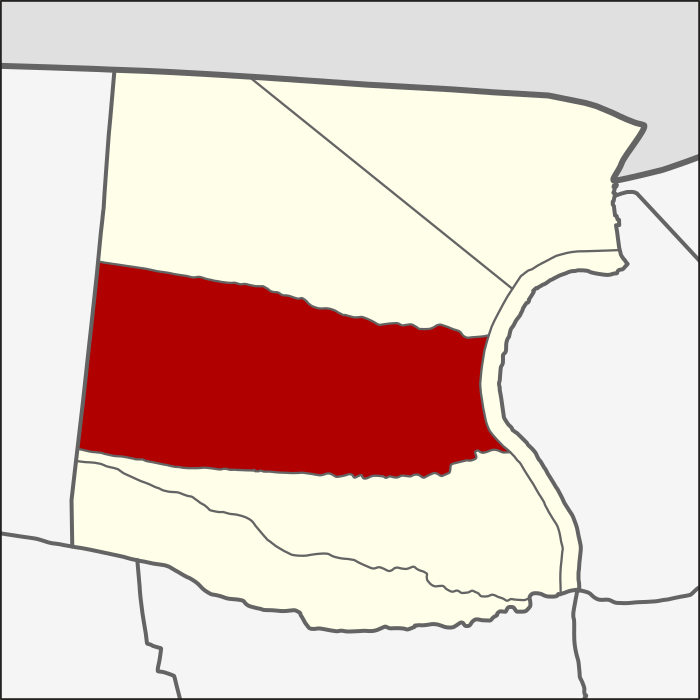
- Location in Taling Chan District
- Country: Thailand
- Province: Bangkok
- Khet: Taling Chan

Area
  - Total: 8.539 km^{2} (3.297 sq mi)

Population (2020)
  - Total: 19,783
- Time zone: UTC+7 (ICT)
- Postal code: 10170
- TIS 1099: 101905

Bang Ramat (Thai: บางระมาด, pronounced [bāːŋ rā.mâːt]) is one of the six khwaengs (subdistricts) of Taling Chan District in Bangkok's Thonburi area. Bang Ramat has 23 administrative villages.

== History ==
It is named after Khlong Bang Ramat, a waterway that runs through the area. It is a khlong (canal) that separates itself from the Khlong Chak Phra, which used to be part of the Chao Phraya River.

The name Bang Ramat means 'place of rhinoceros ['ramat' is a loanword from the Khmer language]. It was mentioned in the Kamsuan Samut or Kamsuan Siprat, an ancient text written in the early-Ayutthaya period. It shows that Bang Ramat was a long-established community before the establishment of Rattanakosin or Bangkok.

Originally, Bang Ramat was a tambon, part of Taling Chan District of Thon Buri Province. Governmental administrative regulations were revised in 1985, promoting Bang Ramat to a subdistrict of Taling Chan District.

== Geography ==
Bang Ramat can be considered as a central part of the district, with a total area of 5,836 rai (about 2,306 acres), divided into agricultural areas 1,729 rai (about 683 acres).

Neighboring subdistricts are (from the north clockwise): Chimphli, Khlong Chak Phra, Bang Phrom, and Sala Thammasop of Thawi Watthana District.

Most of the area are vegetable gardens and orchards with various temples lined both sides of khlong. Some are ancient temples with historical and artistic values.

The Bang Ramat Railway Halt is in the area of Taling Chan Subdistrict.

== Places ==
- Wat Champa
- Khlong Lat Mayom Floating Market
- Potisarnpittayakorn School
