= Wat Kanchana Singhat =

Buddhist temple in Bangkok, Thailand

- วัดกาญจนสิงหาสน์
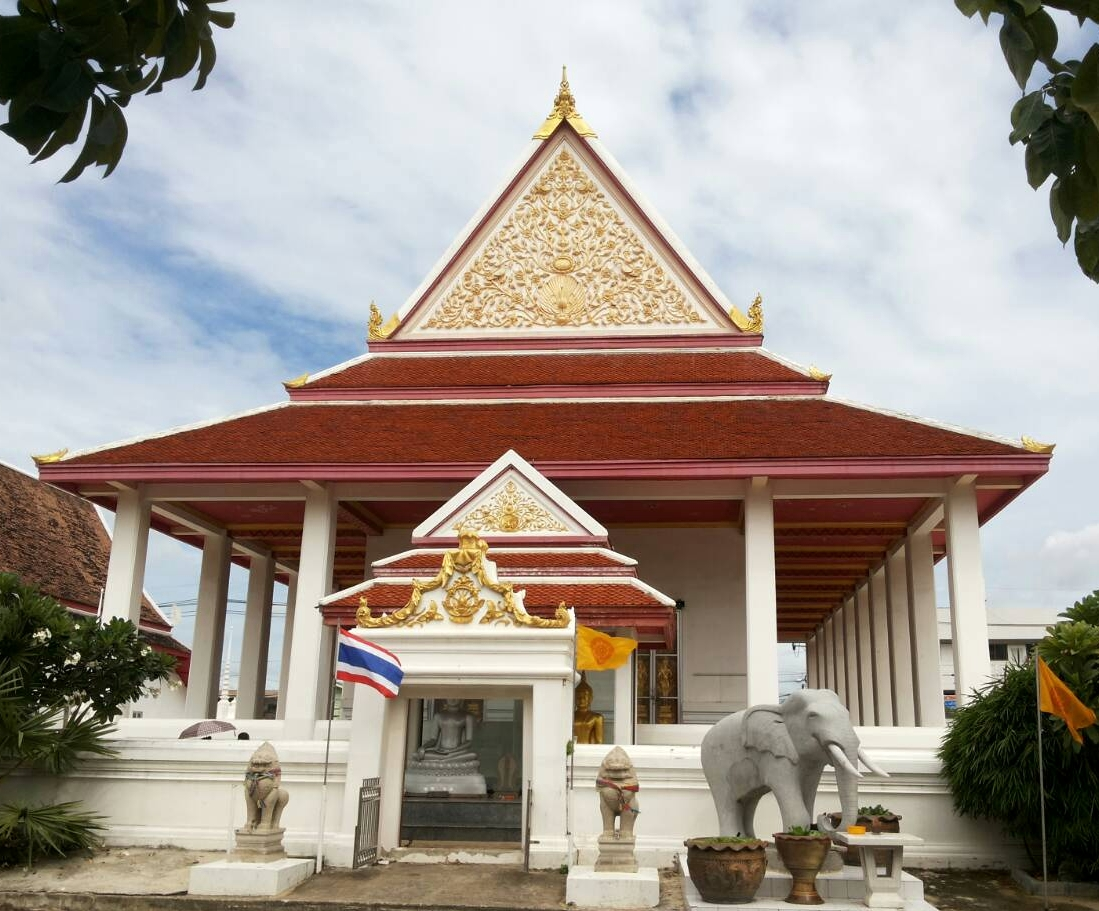
- The ordination hall

- Location within Bangkok

Religion
- Affiliation: Buddhism
- Sect: Theravāda Mahā Nikāya
- Status: Third-class royal temple

Location
- Location: 686 Kaeo Ngoen Thong Rd, Khlong Chak Phra, Taling Chan, Bangkok 10170
- Country: Thailand
- Interactive map of Wat Kanchana Singhat
- Coordinates: 13.760129°N 100.453883°E

Architecture
- Founder: Chao Sua Thong

Wat Kanchana Singhat Worawiharn (Thai: วัดกาญจนสิงหาสน์วรวิหาร) formerly and still colloquially known as Wat Thong (วัดทอง) or Wat Thong Bang Phrom (วัดทองบางพรม) is an ancient temple in Bangkok.

== History ==
It is a monastery of Ayutthaya period has been restowed and bestowed as the third classed royal temple by Princess Rupsirisophak Mahanaknari (mother of Queen Amarindra) during the King Rama I's reign. After being renovated once again during the King Rama III's reign. The temple was renamed as Wat Kanchana Singhat ("golden lion temple") by the King Rama IV.

Originally called Wat Thong (gold temple), which is named after the creator magnate Thong (เจ้าสัวทอง), the younger brother of the magnate Ngoen (เจ้าสัวเงิน), the creator of its counterpart, Wat Ngoen or now called Wat Ratchada Thitthan.

The temple's bai sema (temple boundary stone) features the beautiful of typical stye of Ayutthaya period. The ordination hall built in Mon style is the house of principle Buddha image in subduing Mara posture, surrounded by four big prang (Khmer style pagoda) in each corner. The concept of this construction is similar to the ordination hall of Wat Ratchada Thitthan.

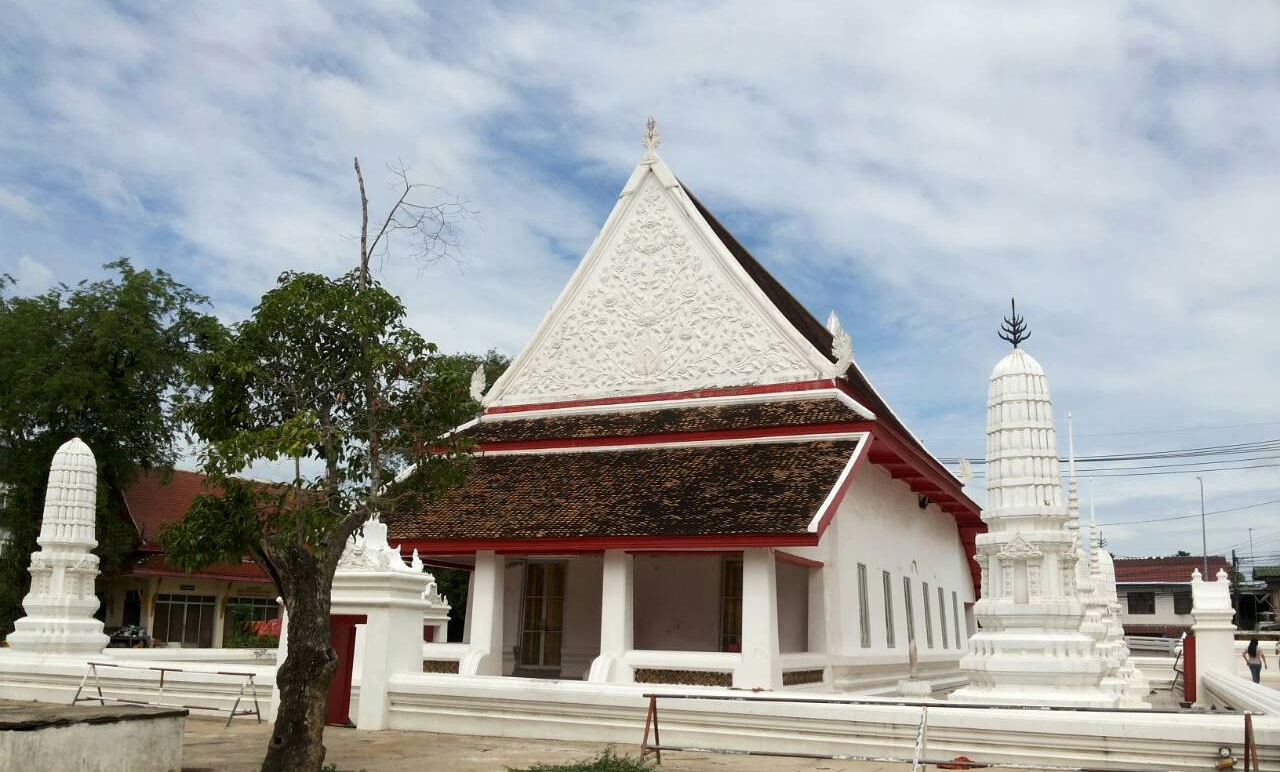
The old ordination hall

It is listed by the Fine Arts Department as a registered ancient monument since 1953 together with Wat Ratchada Thitthan.

== Location ==
The temple is located on the northern side of the Khlong Bang Phrom opposite Wat Ratchada Thitthan.
