= Wat Pak Nam Fang Nuea =

Thai Buddhist temple in Bangkok

- วัดปากน้ำฝั่งเหนือ
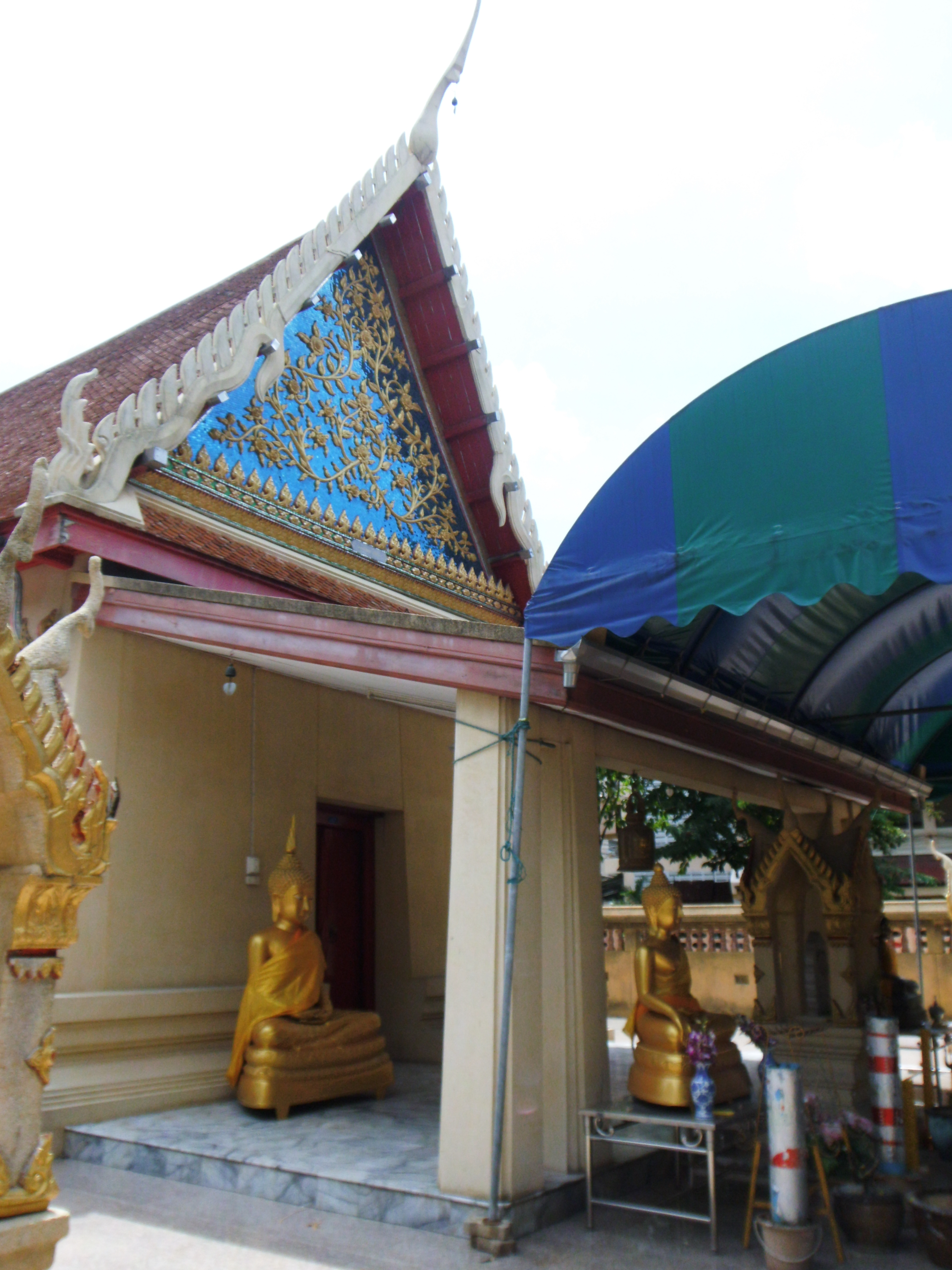
- The ordination hall

- Location within Bangkok

Religion
- Affiliation: Buddhism
- Sect: Theravāda Mahā Nikāya
- Status: Civilian temple

Location
- Location: 183 Soi Pak Nam Fang Nuea 19, Pak Nam Fang Nuea Road, Khlong Chak Phra, Taling Chan, Bangkok 10170
- Country: Thailand
- Interactive map of Wat Pak Nam Fang Nuea
- Coordinates: 13.744273°N 100.459445°E

Architecture
- Founder: Unknown

Wat Pak Nam Fang Nuea (Thai: วัดปากน้ำฝั่งเหนือ, pronounced [wát pàːk náːm fàŋ nɯ̌a]) is an old Thai Buddhist temple in Bangkok. It is a twin monastery of Wat Pak Nam Fang Tai, standing on the opposite bank of Khlong Bang Chueak Nang.

The temple history is unclear, assumed to be built around 1827 and received wis̄ungkhāms̄īmā (วิสุงคามสีมา, "the boundary of the temple was bestowed by the king") in 1835.

According to legend, the founders of the two temples were brothers. After a disagreement, they decided to part ways and each built a temple on opposite banks of the canal, Wat Pak Nam Fang Nuea (lit. 'north bank river mouth temple') and Wat Pak Nam Fang Tai (lit. 'south bank river mouth temple').

Wat Pak Nam Fang Nuea is smaller than Wat Pak Nam Fang Tai. The ordination hall is small in Mon style, facing east, with a single door without windows, known locally as mhaaud (มหาอุด). The principal Buddha image in the posture of meditation is called Luang Phor Petch (หลวงพ่อเพชร).

Originally, it was inaccessible by car. In 2004, Wat Pak Nam Wittayakom School (present-day Princess Ubolratana Rajakanya's College), located on the temple grounds, opened up a space in the back of the school, thus allowing cars to access the temple.

The temple is listed by the Fine Arts Department as a registered ancient monument in 2023.
