= Bang Phrom Subdistrict =

Bang Phrom Subdistrict may refer to:

- Bang Phrom Subdistrict, Bangkok
- Bang Phrom Subdistrict in Bang Khonthi District, Samut Songkhram Province
