= Khanom khai pla =

Thai dessert

- Type: Thai dessert
- Place of origin: Thailand
- Region or state: central Thailand
- Created by: Thai people
- Main ingredients: toddy palm, rice flour, white sugar, and shredded coconut

Khanom khai pla (Thai: ขนมไข่ปลา, pronounced [kʰānǒm kʰàj plāː]; literally: "fish-roe snack") is a type of Thai dessert. It can be considered as a very rare dessert.

Khanom khai pla is made from the ripe toddy palm fruit (similar to khanom tan), rice flour and white sugar, it is then formed into what resembles fish roe and then boiled in water or clean syrup. Once cooked it floats to the surface, where it is removed and sprinkled with shredded coconut. It also has a taro flavour.

Presently, as far as is known, it is only cooked and sold in few places for example Ko Kret in Nonthaburi, 100 Years Sam Chuk Old Market in Sam Chuk, Suphan Buri, San Chao Rong Thong Market in San Chao Rong Thong, Ang Thong, Khlong Suan 100 Years Market on eastern outskirts Bangkok, Khlong Lat Mayom Floating Market in Bangkok's Taling Chan, etc.

== See also ==
- List of Thai desserts and snacks
