= Khlong Suan 100 Years Market =

Traditional marketplace in Thailand

Coordinates: 13°39′43.2″N 100°57′23.6″E

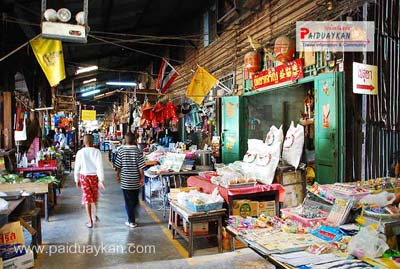
General atmosphere of the market

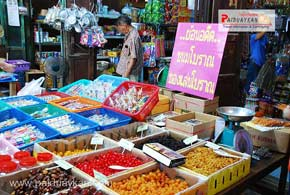
Many types of Thai desserts and snacks for sale

Khlong Suan 100 Years Market, also referred to simply as Khlong Suan Market (Thai: ตลาดคลองสวน 100 ปี, ตลาดคลองสวน) is a traditional waterfront marketplace in Bang Bo and Ban Pho districts, Thailand. The market is located along both sides of the canal Khlong Prawet Burirom, overlapping areas of Chachoengsao and Samut Prakan provinces. The bridge connecting these two parts together is called Atsawanit.

The market began during King Rama V's reign at the same time as Khlong Prawet Buri Rom was canalized. It is one of many communities and markets between Bangkok and east along both sides of the canal.

In an era when water travel and transportation were still prosperous, it was important community centre, transit point for commuters, and cargo port. The water bus picked up passengers at Chachoengsao, ran past Khlong Suan Market, and eventually arrived at Pratunam pier in Bangkok. This passenger transport business was operated by Nai Lert.

As time passed, the market was sluggish, and no more boats arrived. In 1999, it was revived and renamed as Khlong Suan 100 Years Market.

There are two-storey wooden shophouses on the waterfront in Chinese-Thai style, and Thai food and desserts, such as Khanom khai, Khanom khai pla, dried snakeskin gourami and their roes from Bang Bo and elsewhere. There are kopi tiam coffee shops on the Chachoengsao side, some of which sell the cold beverage oliang.

This market is open daily. However, the market become more lively on the weekends and the festive holidays.
