= Wat Champa =

Thai Buddhist temple in Bangkok

Coordinates: 13°46′30″N 100°26′03″E

- วัดจำปา
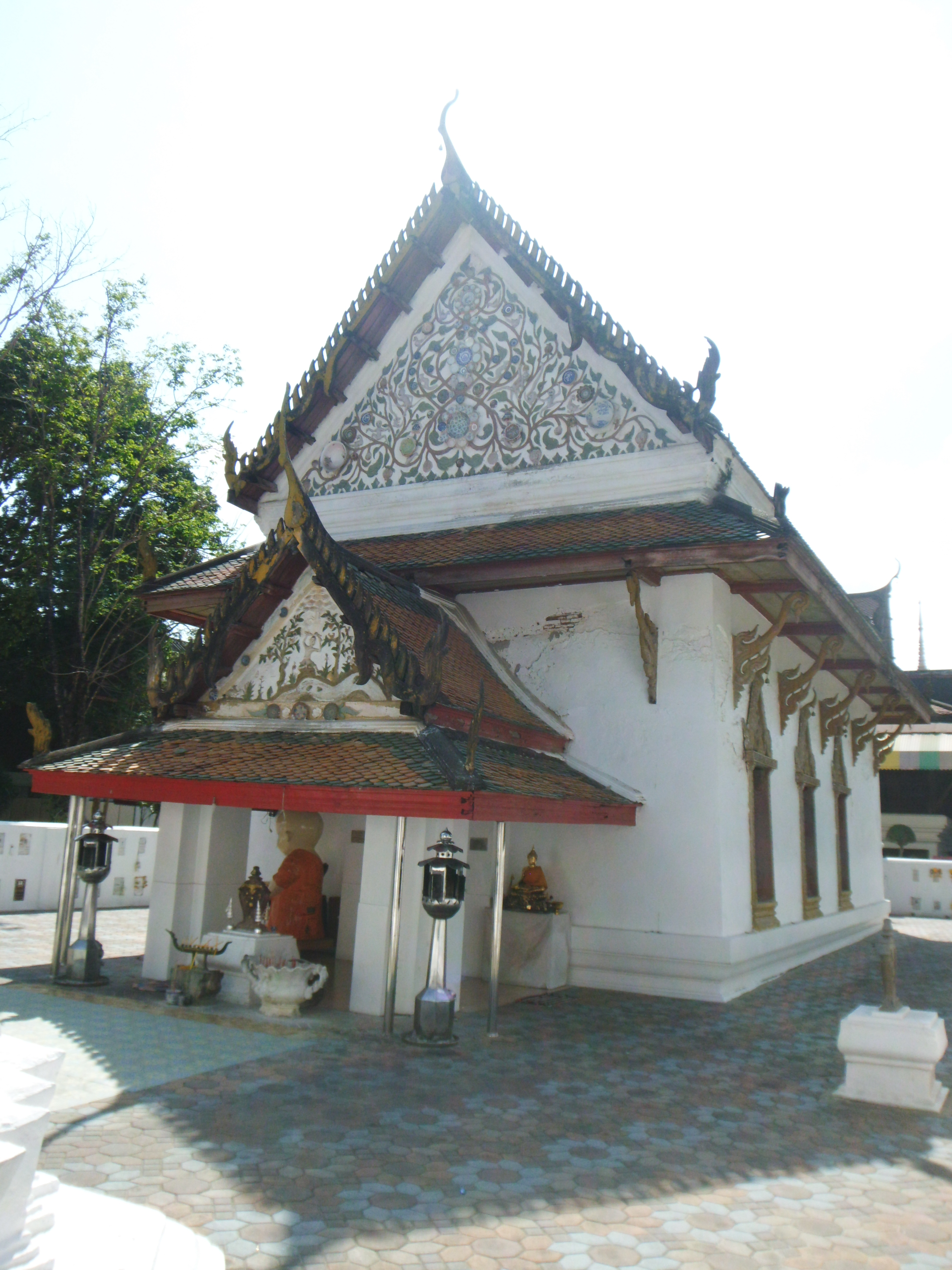
- Ordination hall

- Location within Thailand

Religion
- Affiliation: Buddhism
- Sect: Theravāda, Mahā Nikāya
- Region: Central

Location
- Location: 27 Soi Phutthamonthon Sai 1 Soi 22, Bang Ramat, Taling Chan, Bangkok
- Country: Thailand
- Interactive map of Wat Champa

Wat Champa (Thai: วัดจำปา, pronounced [wát t͡ɕām.pāː]) is an ancient Thai Buddhist temple in Bang Ramat Sub-District, Taling Chan District, Bangkok's Thonburi side.

== History ==
Wat Champa (lit. 'champak temple') was built in the late Ayutthaya period and underwent a massive restoration in the King Rama III's reign during early Rattanakosin period. The gables of the ordination hall of temple are studded with Chinese porcelain and the window frames are made of elaborately carved wood. Behind this hall is a pool of holy water that is more than 100 years old, it never runs dry and the water is believed to cure illnesses.

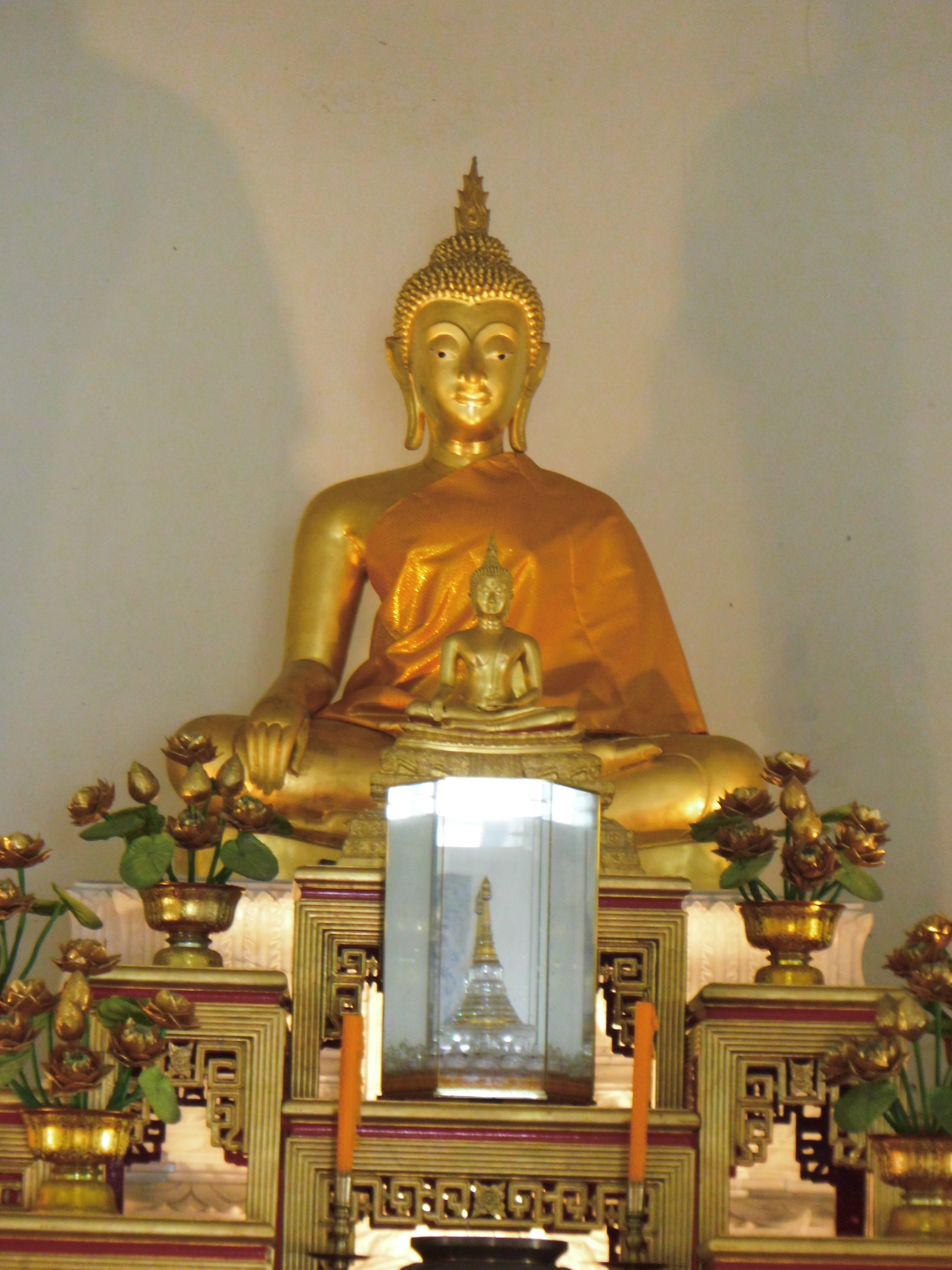
Luang Por Chokdee

The principle Buddha statue named "Luang Por Chokdee" (หลวงพ่อโชคดี), which means "lucky venerable father".

== Tourism ==
Wat Champa Community, also known as Ko San Chao Community (ชุมชนเกาะศาลเจ้า), is a settlement of locals who live around the temple. Although the community is surrounded by highways and urban development, it remains inaccessible by road, making it a verdant oasis of fruit plantations and canals, hence the name "ko" or island in Thai. The community is believed to have existed for more than 500 years.

The name Ko San Chao ("shrine island") comes from a shrine at the center of the community, located where Khlong Bang Ramat meets Khlong Ban Sai. This is the shrine of Chao Por Chui, a water deity long revered by the locals.

Today, the community still preserves its traditional way of life. Visitors can experience this through traditional Thai-style homestays. It is also one of the last places to maintain the traditional craft of banana engraving, once used in various auspicious ceremonies.

The community is not far from other attractions such as Wat Champa itself, Taling Chan Floating Market, and Khlong Lat Mayom.

Wat Champa and its community are not served by BMTA buses, as the area lies among gardens and canals. Visitors can reach it by boat, or by taking a songthaew (Thai-style minibus) from Siriraj Piyamaharajkarun Hospital for a fare of just eight baht.
