= Wat Ratchada Thitthan =

- วัดรัชฎาธิษฐาน
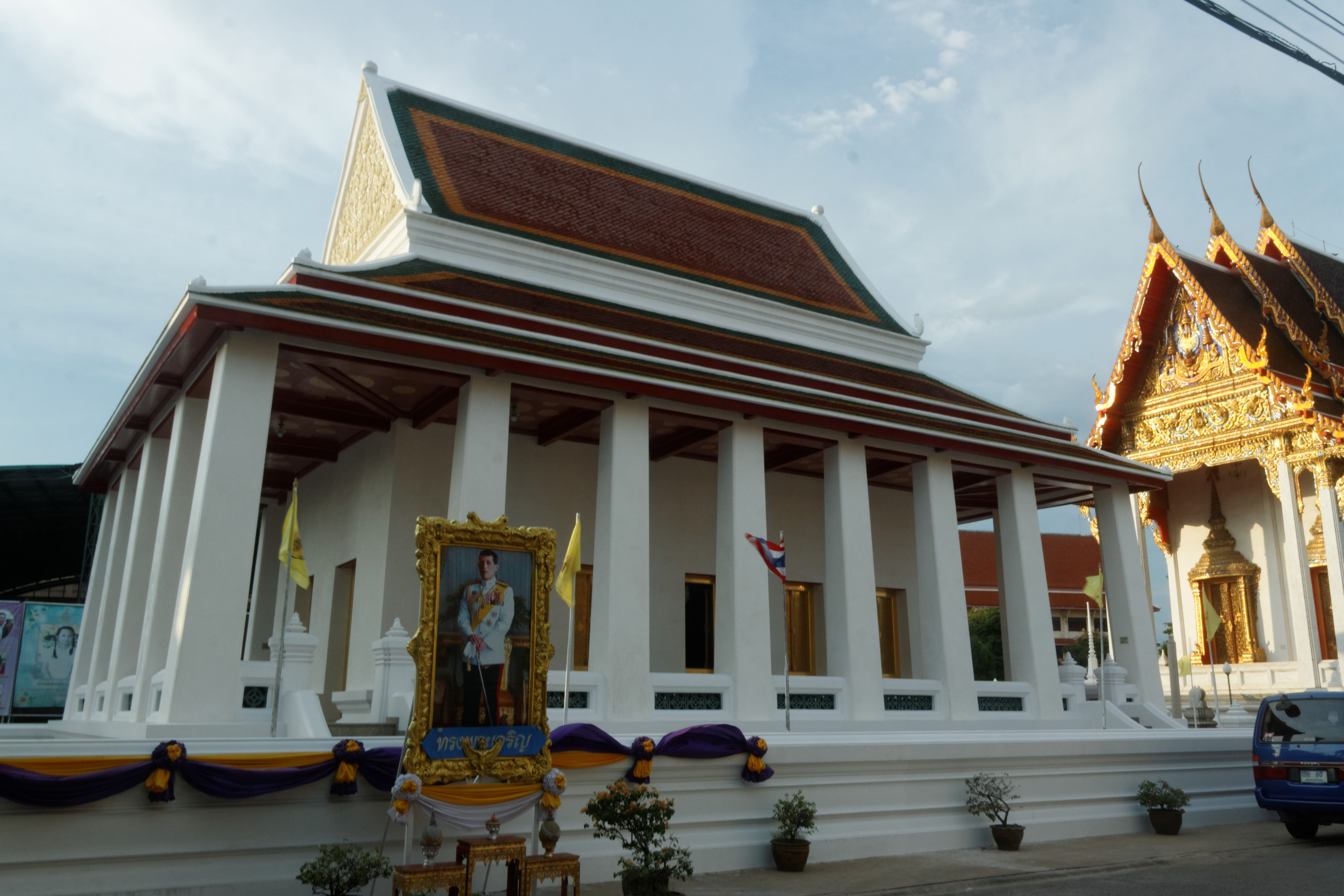
- The chapel and the ordination hall

- Location within Bangkok

Religion
- Affiliation: Buddhism
- Sect: Theravāda Mahā Nikāya
- Status: Third-class royal temple

Location
- Location: 692 Kaeo Ngoen Thong Road (Soi Charansanitwong 35), Bang Phrom, Taling Chan, Bangkok 10170
- Country: Thailand
- Interactive map of Wat Ratchada Thitthan
- Coordinates: 13.758611°N 100.453917°E

Architecture
- Founder: Chao Sua Ngoen

Wat Ratchada Thitthan Ratchaworawihan (Thai: วัดรัชฎาธิษฐานราชวรวิหาร) is a Thai Buddhist temple in Bangkok.

== History ==
The temple would be classified as a third-class royal monastery. Formerly and still colloquially known as Wat Ngoen (วัดเงิน, "silver temple") after the founder, Sino magnate Ngoen (เจ้าสัวเงิน) who was husband to the Princess Si Sudarak, an elder sister of King Rama I. Later Queen Amarindra restored the entire temple when it began to deteriorate, and made it a royal temple.

King Rama IV ordered it restored again and changed its name to "Wat Ratchada Thitthan". It is considered as one of the most valuable heritage building during the Bangkok period.

The temple possesses a stone seat on which. King Rama IV and King Rama V sat white donating gifts to the public.

The ordination hall was built in the Chinese style of art, without roof finials as in traditional Thai architecture.

The principle Buddha image which was made of bronze during the King Rama I's reign represents the subduing Mara posture.

== Location ==
It is located along the southern bank of canal Khlong Bang Phrom. As opposed to its counterpart temple Wat Kanchanasinghas Worawihan, also known as Wat Thong (วัดทอง, "gold temple").
