= Khlong Chak Phra subdistrict =

Sub-district in Bangkok, Thailand

Coordinates: 13°46′35.96″N 100°27′23.51″E

Khlong Chak Phra คลองชักพระ
- Khwaeng
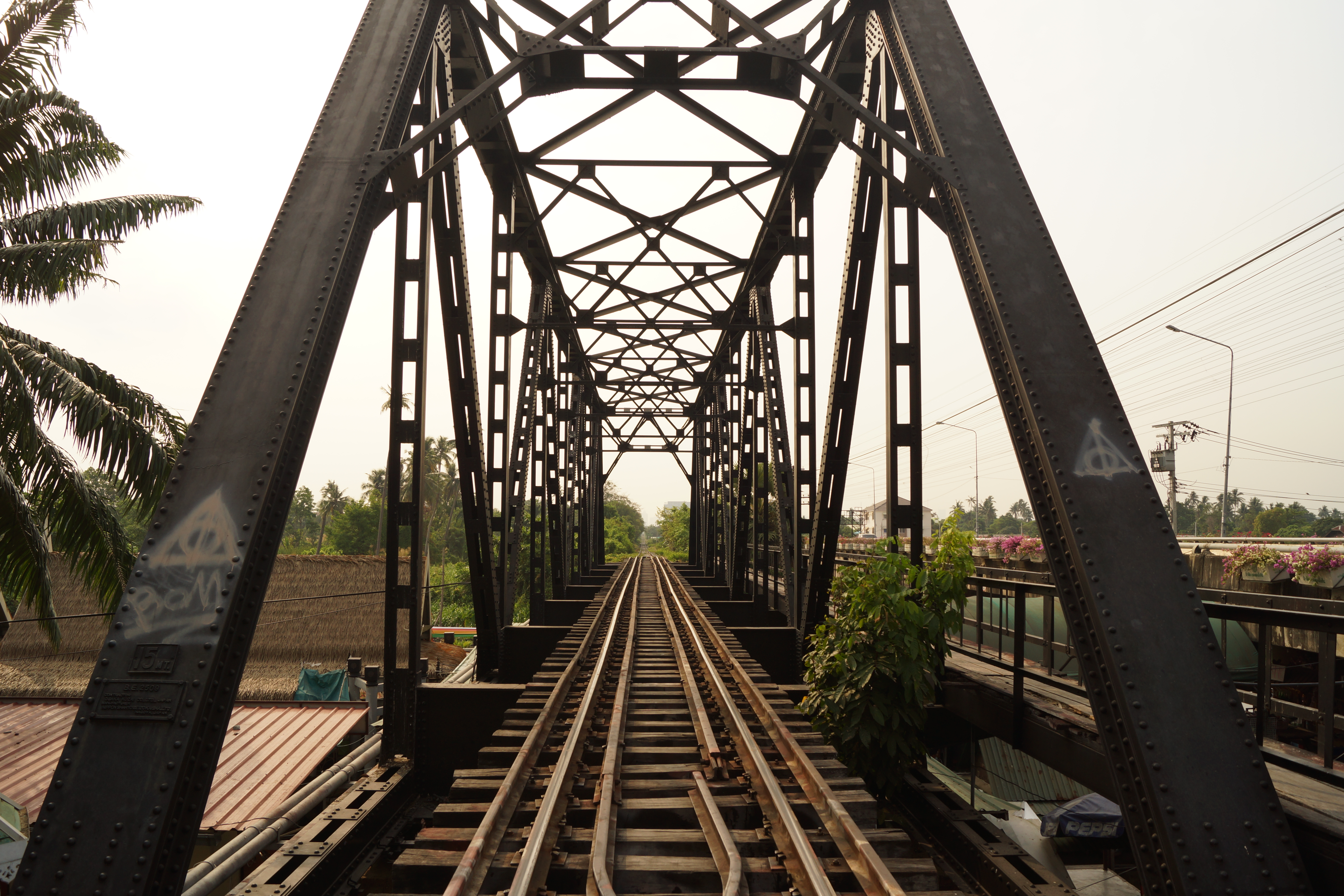
- Viaduct over Khlong Chak Phra

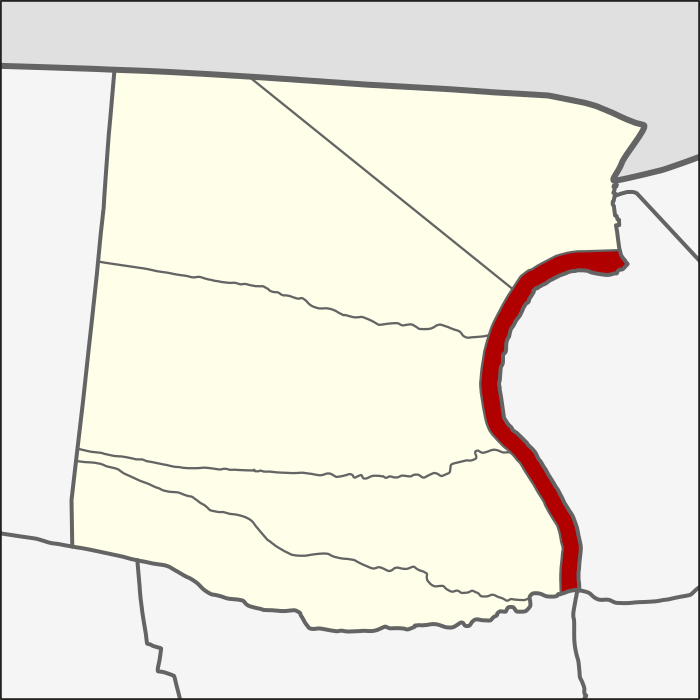
- Location in Taling Chan District
- Country: Thailand
- Province: Bangkok
- Khet: Taling Chan

Area
  - Total: 1.251 km^{2} (0.483 sq mi)

Population (2020)
  - Total: 9,982
- Time zone: UTC+7 (ICT)
- Postal code: 10170
- TIS 1099: 101901

Khlong Chak Phra (Thai: คลองชักพระ, pronounced [kʰlɔ̄ːŋ t͡ɕʰák pʰráʔ]) is one of the six khwaengs (sub-districts) of Taling Chan District in Bangkok's Thonburi side. It is the location of the district office.

== Geography ==
It is named after Khlong Chak Phra, that currents through right side of the area and also a borderline with other districts. Geography of Khlong Chak Phra is long and thin, giving it a curve-like shape and the easternmost of the district, with a total area of 1.251 km^{2} (0.483 mi^{2}). Most of the area consisting of lowlands along the waterways, therefore often flooding regularly.

Neighbouring sub-districts are (from the north clockwise): Taling Chan in its district, Arun Amarin, Bang Khun Non and Bang Khun Si of Bangkok Noi District, Khuha Sawan of Phasi Charoen District, Bang Phrom, Bang Ramat, and Chimphli in its district.

== Transportation ==
The area is served by the Bang Ramat Railway Halt of the State Railway of Thailand (SRT), whose Southern Line passes beside Taling Chan Floating Market and Taling Chan District Office.

== Local legend ==
Khlong Chak Phra has a local legend about a ghost named Phi Yai Wan (ผียายหวาน, "ghost of Mrs. Wan"), a pregnant woman whose story resembles that of the famous Mae Nak Phra Khanong. Like Mae Nak, she reportedly died while pregnant, and her spirit is said to haunt people, especially tuk-tuk and taxi drivers, at night. Witnesses claim she appears in eerie ways; for example, she might hail a cab, then suddenly vanish without a trace, or appear hanging upside down from a tree. Her story is believed to be true, with the incident said to have occurred around 1970–71. According to the tale, she was a local trader who was shot and killed by her possessive husband near the railway tracks by Taling Chan Junction and Wat Taling Chan, Some say, however, that she hanged herself.

Today, an old wooden boat, believed to have belonged to Yai Wan, is still preserved at Wat Champa in Bang Ramat.

One man who claims to have experienced the haunting firsthand said it happened in 1975. The ghost he encountered was a woman named Daeng Wan (แดงหวาน), whom he considered his sister-in-law. She had been fatally shot by her husband in the early morning, after he mistook her for a fishing cat that had been pestering the area. The boat, believed to be Yai Wan's, was actually his own; he later donated it to Wat Champa because it was haunted. According to this man's own account, Daeng Wan's spirit still rows the canal beside Wat Champa at night.

== Places of interest ==
- Taling Chan Floating Market
- Wat Chang Lek
- Wat Taling Chan
- Wat Paknam Fang Nuea
- Song Khlong Floating Market
