= Si Prat =

Legendary Thai poet

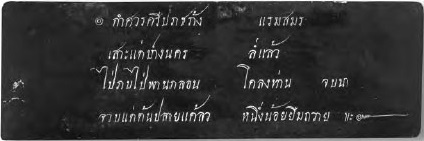
Samut khoi page from an early Rattanakosin copy of Kamsuan Samut, one of the best-known works traditionally attributed to Si Prat.

Si Prat (Thai: ศรีปราชญ์) (Note: Also spelled Siprad, Sri Prat, Sri Praj, etc.) is a legendary Thai poet believed to have served King Narai during the 17th century. According to traditional tellings, he was subsequently banished to South Thailand as a result of his personal indiscretions and executed after having an affair with the wife of a provincial governor.

Si Prat is regarded as one of the foremost Thai poets of the Ayutthaya period and epitomizes the genius court poet during the kingdom's golden age of literature. The 131-stanza poem Kamsuan Samut (c. 1680), regarded as a seminal work from the era, has traditionally been attributed to him, as is the Anirut Kham Chan. However, the attributions have been questioned by late 20th-century literary scholarship, and the historical existence of Si Prat is nowadays regarded as a myth by most academics.

== Biography ==
=== Career ===
According to tradition, Si Prat was born Si in 1650, the son of the court astrologer, poet, and royal teacher Phra Horathibodi. (Note: Or Praya Horadhipati, also given as Phra Maharatchakhru or Phra Maharajagru.) He demonstrated a flair for writing from a young age. The story goes that one day when Si was twelve years old, his father had been tasked by King Narai to finish a poem for him due to writer's block. Unable to complete the task right away, Si's father brought the work home, and next morning found that the missing lines had been filled in by his young son. Impressed by the sharp writing but also worried that his son had overstepped his place, Si's father reluctantly submitted the poem to the King, who was very pleased and accepted Si into his court as a royal page. One legend has it that during a hunting expedition, Si was accorded the title "Si Prat", which means "great scholar", by King Narai after composing a few lines that pleased him greatly.

Si Prat's career as a court poet coincided with what is dubbed the "Golden Age of Thai literature". In his early years, he is believed to have written the Anirut Kham Chan ("The Tale of Anirut"), a parallel to the story of Aniruddha in the Puranas which has been described by Thomas J. Hudak as a "masterpiece of punning and word play". Many anecdotes tell of Si Prat engaging in improvised oral poetry with members of the court, such as guardsmen and royal concubines, sometimes flirting with the latter. At age 27, he was discovered to have had an affair with Thao Si Chulalak, one of Narai's consorts. This was punishable by death, but out of respect for Si Prat's father, the King commuted his sentence and banished him to Nakhon Si Thammarat in the south instead. On his way to exile, Si Prat is believed to have penned the Kamsuan Samut ("Ocean Lament") or Kamsuan Si Prat ("The Mourning of Si Prat"), a nirat poem which follows the speaker as he flees from Ayutthaya with a heavy heart. It has been described as a masterpiece of Thai literature.

=== Death ===
In Nakhon Si Thammarat, Si Prat became established as a poet, and was often invited to the governor's residence. In 1683, at 31 years of age, he was found to be having an affair with one of the governor's minor wives. Ignorant of Si Prat's reputation in the royal palace, the governor promptly had Si Prat executed.

Legend has it that while blindfolded and tied to the post for his beheading, Si Prat used his toe to write a khlong poem in the sand. This poem cursed those who wrongly condemned him to face the same sword. A few months later, Narai, wishing to pardon Si Prat, learned of his death and accordingly had the governor executed with the same sword.

ธรณีนี่นี้	เป็นพยาน
เราก็ศิษย์มีอาจารย์	หนึ่งบ้าง
เราผิดท่านประหาร	เราชอบ
เราบ่ผิดท่านมล้าง	ดาบนี้คืนสนองฯ

— A common variation of the poem said to be written by Si Prat upon his execution

Bear me witness, ye Earth,
Spite not God's image in man.
If wrong I did, let this sword fall true and sharper,
If wronged I am, let it strike back the striker.

— Translation by Seni Pramoj

The poem has since become one of the best known verses attributed to Si Prat. A pond within the modern day grounds of Kanlayaneesithammarat School in Nakhon Si Thammarat is known as "Sa Lang Dap Sri Prat" ("Washing Sri Prat's Sword Pond") and is allegedly where the executioner washed his sword after executing him, though this has been disputed by local historian Khun Athet Khadi, who argued that it is a later pond from 1905. Nevertheless, a statue of the poet was erected at the school in 2009.

== Historicity ==
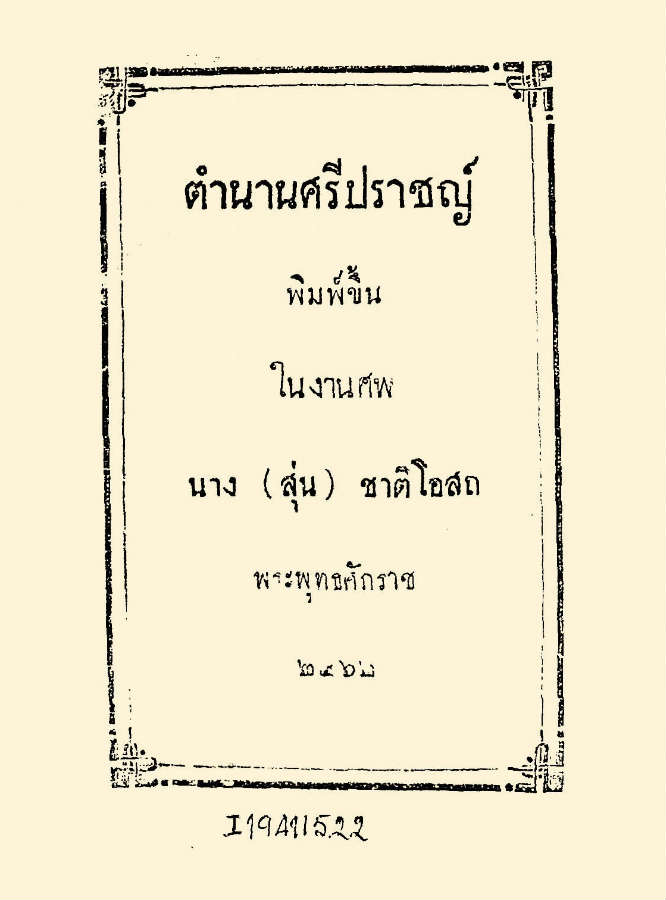
Title page of Tamnan Si Prat (1919), the first detailed account of Si Prat's life

The earliest written accounts of Si Prat's existence are found in Khamhaikan Khun Luang Ha Wat and Khamhaikan Chao Krung Kao, documents derived from an original Mon chronicle compiled from the testimony of Siamese captives following the fall of Ayutthaya in 1767. These documents focus on his banishment and death, but state that they happened during the reign of King Suriyenthrathibodi, several decades later than Narai. The detailed biography which gives explicit years for Si Prat's birth and death and places his lifetime during Narai's reign was written by Phraya Pariyattithammathada (Phae Talalak) and published as a cremation volume titled Tamnan Si Prat ("The Legend of Si Prat") in 1919. The work, based in large part on oral tradition, has been criticized by later scholars; Chetana Nagavajara described it as "unabashed myth-making".

One of the early doubters of the historicity of the Si Prat legend was P. Na Pramuanmak (pen name of Prince Chand Chirayu Rajani), who edited and published a version of Kamsuan Si Prat in 1959, noting that its language was much earlier than the time of King Narai. A 2006 volume, edited by Sujit Wongthes, follows the same thought, suggesting that Kamsuan Samut was from the early Ayutthaya period, and that Si Prat was a folktale figure much like the trickster Si Thanonchai. Earlier in 1947, Sumonajati Swasdikul suggested that Si Prat may have been a title shared by many. Winai Pongsripian, who made a detailed analysis of Kamsuan Samut in 2010, believes that the events ascribed to Si Prat's life may have been actual events of court gossip which later came to be attached to the name, while Na Pramuanmak and Gilles Delouche have explained the name's mention in the testimony documents as deliberate misinformation or an attempt to create a mythical poet figure to rival the Burmese Nawade.

Although there is now scholarly consensus that Kamsuan Samut and the other works traditionally attributed to Si Prat were not written by him, and that he probably did not exist as commonly told, this consensus has not spread far outside of academic circles. The general public remains familiar with the traditional version of the Si Prat story, thanks in part to its popularization by the Fine Arts Department and its inclusion in school curricula since the 1970s. But whether seen as a historical figure or a fictional creation, Si Prat is regarded as a symbol of creative genius, the great poet from an idealized period of literary flourishing.

== Bibliography ==
- Baker, Chris; Phongpaichit, Pasuk (2017). A History of Ayutthaya. Cambridge University Press. ISBN 9781107190764.
- Dudley, Donald R.; Lang, David M. (1969). The Penguin Companion to Literature: Classical and Byzantine. Penguin.
- Ghosh, Lipi (2017). India-Thailand Cultural Interactions: Glimpses from the Past to Present. Springer. ISBN 9789811038549.
- Greene, Roland; Cushman, Stephen; Cavanagh, Clare; Ramazani, Jahan; Rouzer, Paul; Feinsod, Harris; Marno, David; Slessarev, Alexendra (2012). The Princeton Encyclopedia of Poetry and Poetics. Princeton University Press. ISBN 9780691154916.
- Hudak, Thomas (1993). The Tale of Prince Samuttakote: A Buddhist Epic from Thailand. Ohio University Center for International Studies. ISBN 9780896801745.
- Khamhaikan Chao Krung Kao คำให้การชาวกรุงเก่า [Testimony of the Inhabitants of the Old Capital] (in Thai). Bangkok: Vajirañana Library. 1914.
- Phraya Pariyattithammathada (1919). ตำนานศรีปราชญ์ [The Legend of Si Prat] (in Thai).
- Preminger, Alex; Warnke, Frank J.; Hardison Jr., O. B. (2015). Princeton Encyclopedia of Poetry and Poetics. Princeton University Press. ISBN 9781400872930.
- Udom Pramuanwit (1962). "ศรีปราชญ์.....ราชกวีเอก" [Si Prat, the great court poet]. ในราชสำนักพระนารายณ์ [In the Court of King Narai] (in Thai). Bangkok: Odeon Store. pp. 373–393. Archived from the original on 2018-05-24.
- United Bible Societies (1974). The Bible Translator.
- Winai Pongsripian, ed. (2010). กำสรวลสมุทร: สุดยอดกำสรวลศิลป์ [Ocean lament: the ultimate of the lament genre] (in Thai). Bangkok: Thailand Research Fund. ISBN 9789742255275. Archived from the original on 2018-07-07.
