= Potisarnpittayakorn School =

School in Thailand

Coordinates: 13.7679°N 100.4269°E

- โรงเรียนโพธิสารพิทยากร
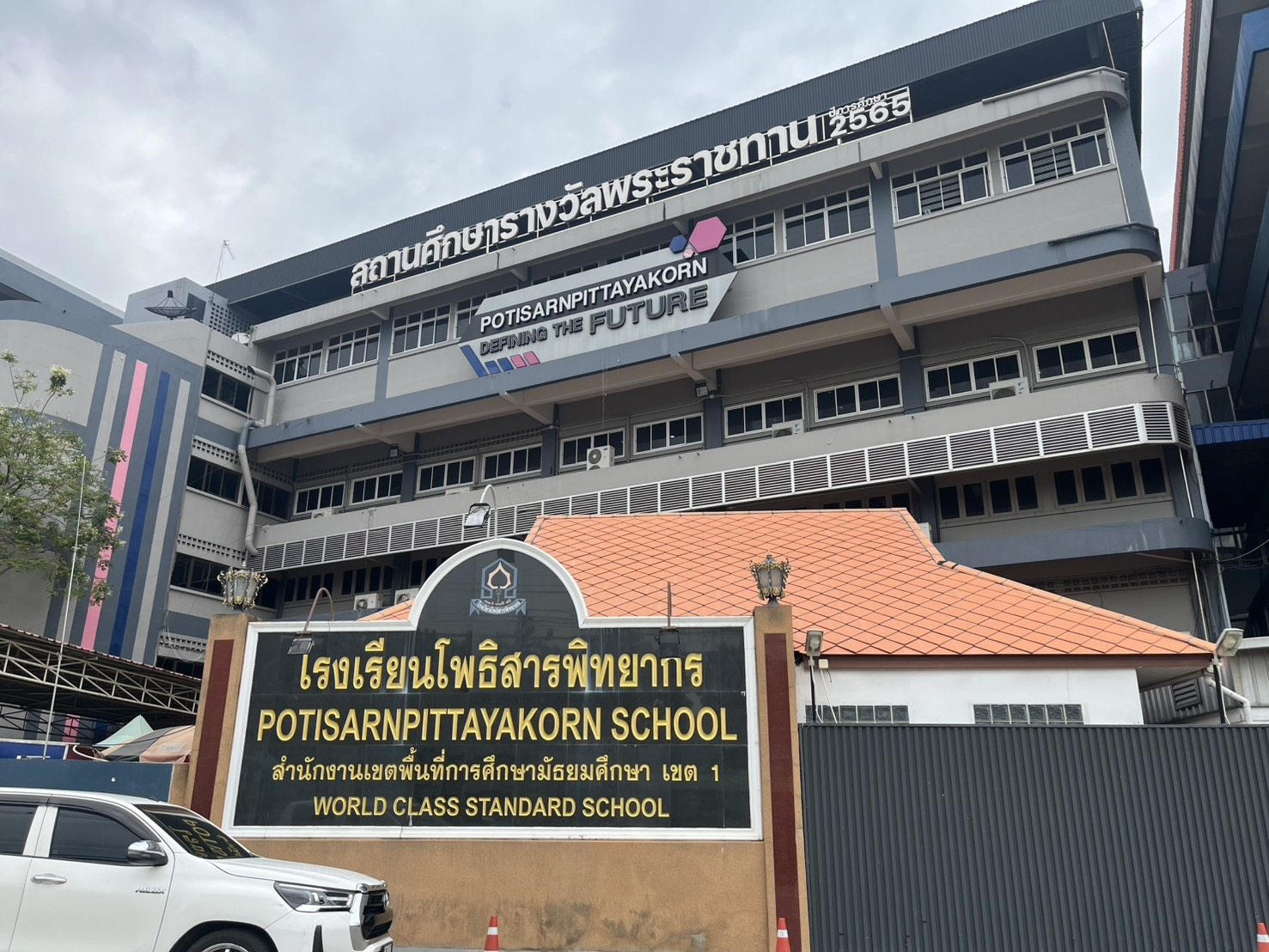
- 120 Thanon Phutthamonthon Sai 1, Bang Ramat, Taling Chan, Bangkok 10170

Information
- Type: Public secondary school
- Motto: อตฺตาหิ อตฺตโน นาโถ “ตนเป็นที่พึ่งแห่งตน” (God helps those who help themselves)
- Established: 1956; 70 years ago
- Founder: Nuan Thamutaro
- Director: Wuttichai Worachin
- Language: (Thailand) Thai
- Song: Potisarnpittaykorn School's March (เพลงมาร์ชโรงเรียนโพธิสารพิทยากร)
- Website: www.ps.ac.th/psth/

A school in Bangkok, Thailand

Potisarnpittayakorn School (Thai: โรงเรียนโพธิสารพิทยากร) is a coeducational secondary school for grades 7 to 12, located in the Taling Chan district of Bangkok, Thailand.

== History ==
Potisarnpittayakorn was founded in 1956 by Nuan Thamutaro (นวล ธมฺมธโร) the incumbent abbot of Wat Pho Taling Chan. Teaching was first conducted on a pavilion next to the Bang Ramat river. Later in 1958, through fundraisers and funding from the government to build a classroom. A 2 story wooden building containing 12 classroom was built.

In 1982, Potisarnpittayakorn was funded a 3-floor concrete building (อาคารขันติมาธรรม) containing 18 classrooms. Later in 1984, the Department of General Education selected Potisarnpittayakorn School for its Small Secondary School improvement program. Under the program, schools will improve in student enrollment, teacher recruitment, and the school's basic infrastructure. In 1986, under the Department of General Education's inter-school academic cooperation program. Suankularb Wittayalai school, Satriwithaya school, and Dipangkornwittayapat School (Wat Noi Nai school) will aid Potisarnpittayakorn in their academic system. Suankularb Wittayalai and Satriwithaya will accept incoming Potisarnpittayakorn students into Matthayom 4 provided that they meet a standard without examination. In 2003, Potisarnpittayakorn rolled out the English Program for Matthayom 1 and Matthayom 4 students. In late 2016, a 6-floor concrete building was built with a meeting room. And lastly, in 2021 the school has built the International building to accommodate their new International Program.

As of 2025, the school consists of 6 main buildings and a football field.

== School Identity ==
- Emblem

The emblem of Potisarnpittayakorn consists of three elements.

Bai Sema (ใบเสมา) representing Thailand’s Ministry of Education.

Trishula (ตรีศูล) representing the now-defunct Department of General Education

The Pho leaf (ใบโพธิ์), representing Potisarnpittayakorn school.

- Motto

Potisarnpittayakorn's motto is a Buddhist proverb “Attā Hi Attanō Nāthō” and in English, it means “God helps those who help themselves”.

- Slogan

Potisarnpittayakorn's slogan is เรียนดี มีวินัย ใจนักกีฬา and consists of 3 parts.

เรียนดี means to study well.

มีน้ำใจ means to be kind.

ใจนักกีฬา means to have the mind of an athlete and never give up until the goal has been fulfilled.

- Flowers

The Tabebuia rosea is the flower of Potisarnpittayakorn

- Colours

The colours that represent Potisarnpittayakorn are blue and pink.

Blue represents disclipine and good behavior.

Pink represents the hard work put into studying.

== School Curriculum ==
As of 2025, Potisarnpittayakorn School offers four types of curriculum for students: the International Program (IP), English Program (EP), Intensive English Program (IEP), and General Program (GP).

=== International Program (IP) ===
The International Program is the newest program with its own curriculum called, "Integrated Curriculum" i.e. It has the planned course of Thailand’s Ministry of Education combined with "South Australian Government Schools" core curriculum of Australia's Department for Education (South Australia) With this, all subjects except Thai are taught in English by foreign teachers. The tuition fee is around 85,000-99,000 baht.

=== English Program (EP) ===
The English Program is planned accordingly with Thailand's Ministry of Education but taught in English, with the exemption of Thai, History, P.E., and Home Economics. The tuition fees ranges from 35,000 - 40,000 for Junior High Students, 41,500 - 43,000 for Senior High Students excluding one-time fees.

=== Intensive English Program (IEP) ===
The Intensive English Program is a course planned following Thailand’s Ministry of Education standard except that foreign teachers teach all English subjects, and Thai teachers teach the others. Students in IEP usually have deeper knowledge in each subject than E.P. students but they would have a hard time understanding English. The tuition fee is 13,500-15,000 baht per semester.

=== General Program (GP) ===
The General Program is a course planned according to Thailand’s Ministry of Education standard. Thai teachers are assigned to teach all subjects. The tuition ranges from 5,600 - 10,600 baht excluding one-time fees.
