= Wat Pak Nam Fang Tai =

Thai Buddhist temple in Bangkok

- วัดปากน้ำฝั่งใต้
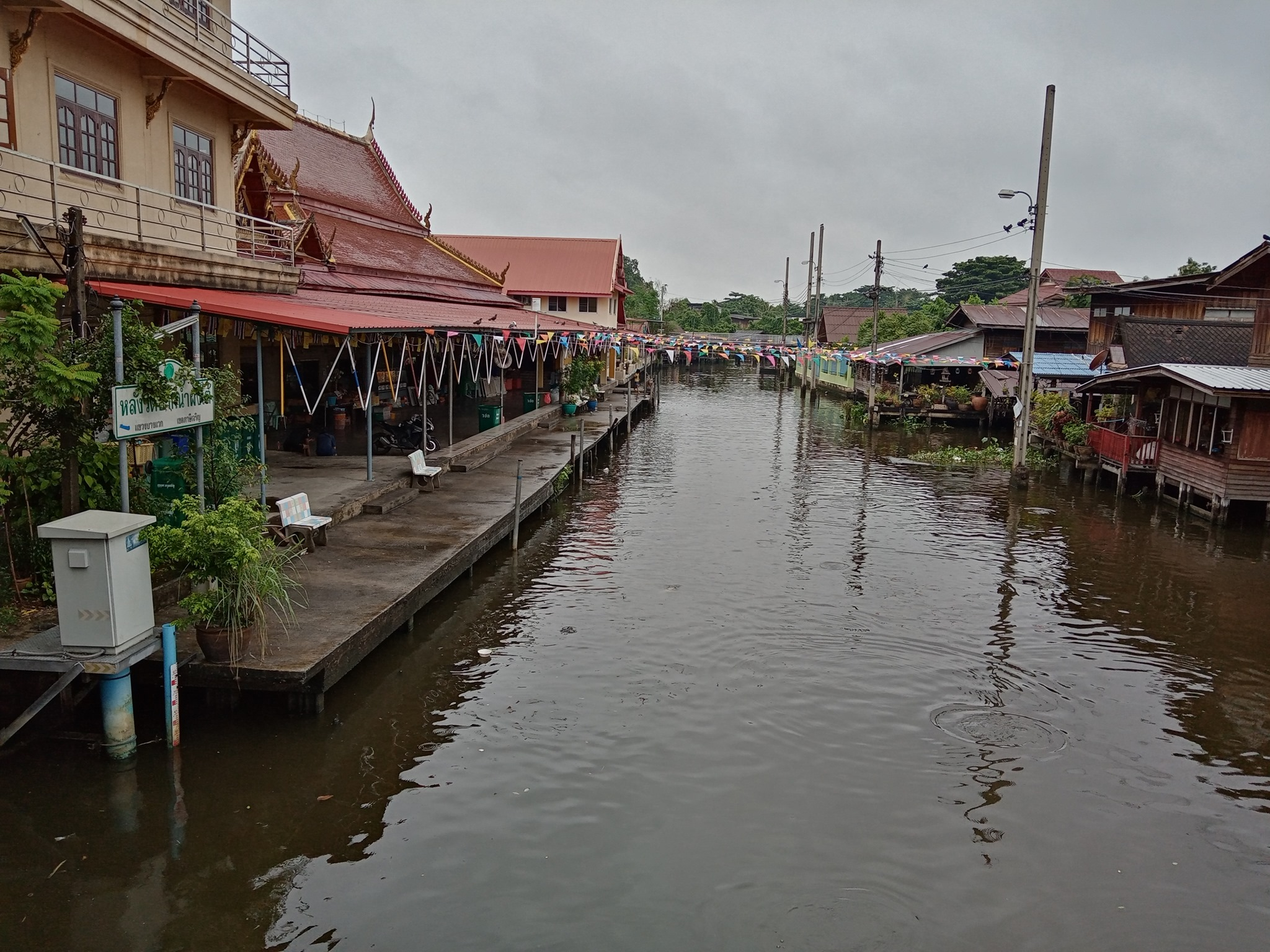

- Location within Bangkok

Religion
- Affiliation: Buddhism
- Sect: Theravāda Mahā Nikāya
- Status: Civilian temple

Location
- Location: 81 Soi Bang Waek 2, Bang Waek Road, Khuha Sawan, Phasi Charoen, Bangkok 10160
- Country: Thailand
- Coordinates: 13.7434785134°N 100.459256248°E

Architecture
- Founder: Unknown

Wat Pak Nam Fang Tai (Thai: วัดปากน้ำฝั่งใต้, pronounced [wát pàːk náːm fàŋ tâːj]) is a Thai Buddhist temple in Bangkok. It is an ancient private temple built since the Ayutthaya period. Its history is unclear, assumed to be built around 1827 or 1880 (corresponds to the King Rama V's reign), and received wis̄ungkhāms̄īmā (วิสุงคามสีมา, "the boundary of the temple was bestowed by the king") in the year 1882.

It is a small and quiet monastery. According to legend, the founders were brothers. Later, due to a misunderstanding, they separated and established different temples. Thus, the two temples became a pair: Wat Pak Nam Fang Nuea on one side, and opposite it, Wat Pak Nam Fang Tai.

Its name meaning "the temple on the southern side of the confluence". Assumed it got this name because of its location near the confluence of Khlong Bang Chueak Nang and Khlong Bang Noi become a Khlong Mon on the southern side. The opposite is the northern side, the location of its counterpart, Wat Pak Nam Fang Nuea.

The pier in front of the temple is sanctum to a large number of iridescent shark. Feeding them with bread or releasing fish for merit are some of the activities that can be done by visitors.

== See also ==
- Wat Pak Nam Fang Nuea – the counterpart temple on the opposite side of the canal
- Wat – Buddhist temples in Thailand
- Buddhism in Thailand
