= Wat Suwan Khiri =

Thai Buddhist temple

- Wat Khi Lek
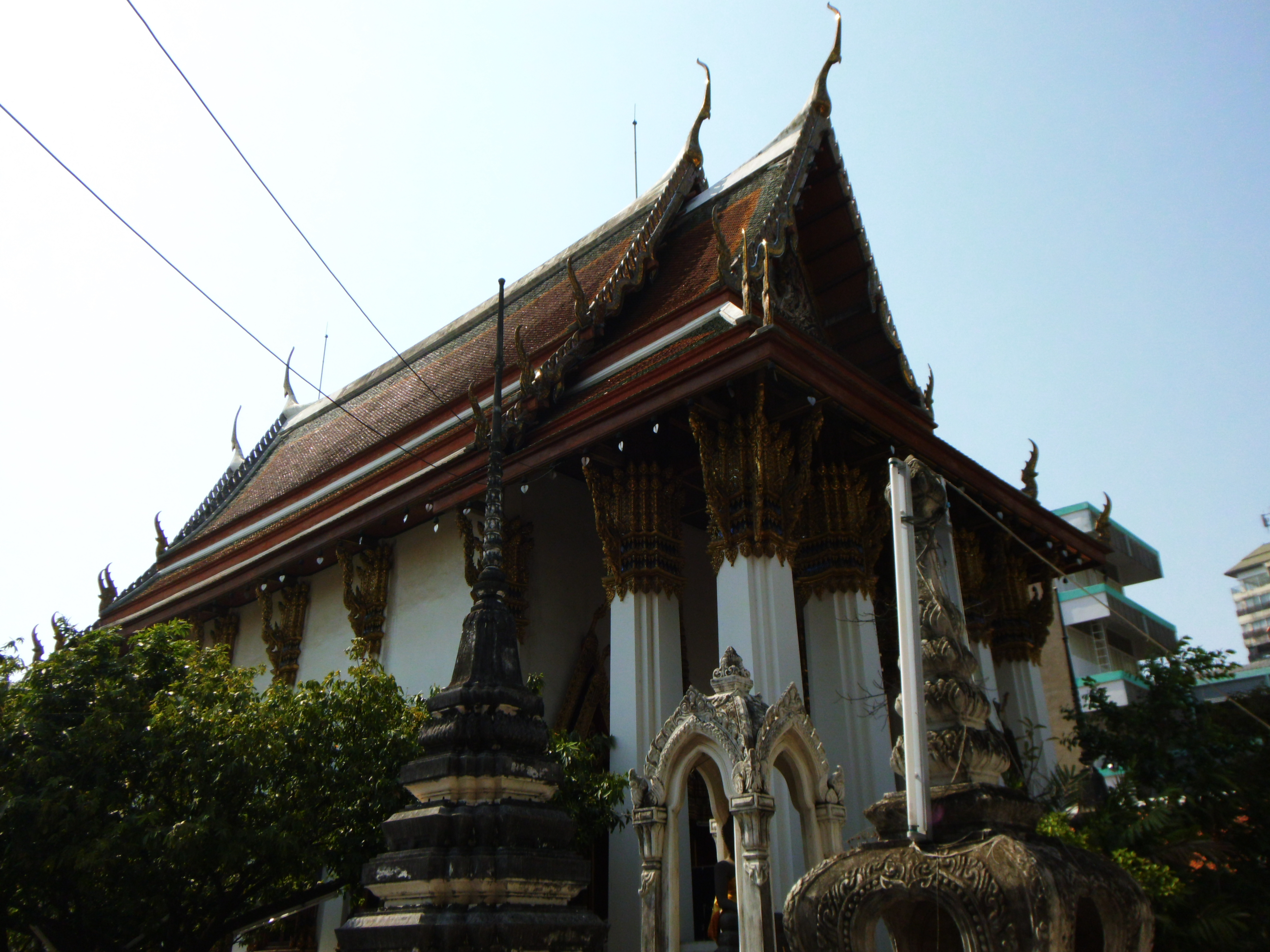
- The ordination hall

- Location within Bangkok

Religion
- Affiliation: Buddhism
- Sect: Theravāda, Mahā Nikāya
- Status: active

Location
- Location: 769 Rung Pracha Rd., Arun Amarin, Bangkok Noi, Bangkok
- Country: Thailand
- Interactive map of Wat Suwan Khiri
- Coordinates: 13.780209°N 100.467972°E

Architecture
- Completed: 1685 (circa)

Wat Suwan Khiri, also spelled Wat Suwan Keree (Thai: วัดสุวรรณคีรี) is an ancient Thai Buddhist temple in Thonburi side of Bangkok.

The temple is formerly and still colloquially known as "Wat Khi Lek" (วัดขี้เหล็ก) owing to a lot of growth edible plants Siamese cassia (Senna siamea) or khi lek in Thai language.

It was built in the end of King Narai's reign of Ayutthaya period around 1685. The interesting point of this temple is its location, it is located on the bank where two canals confluence were Khlong Bangkok Noi and Khlong Chak Phra, which is unsuitable position according to the beliefs of Thai people since ancient times. Hence, the temple therefore had to bring a standing Buddha image in attitude of pacifying the ocean enshrined in a pavilion at this area there to protect the temple from all evils.

In the Rattanakosin period, Prince Maha Sura Singhanat (younger brother of King Rama I) renovated the whole temple and renamed to "Wat Suwan Khiri" (golden mountain temple) in the year 1795.

On October 22, 1929, King Prajadhipok (Rama VII) presided over the private Kathin ceremony.
