= Khlong Chak Phra =

Canal in Bangkok, Thailand

Coordinates: 13°46′36.69″N 100°27′27.57″E

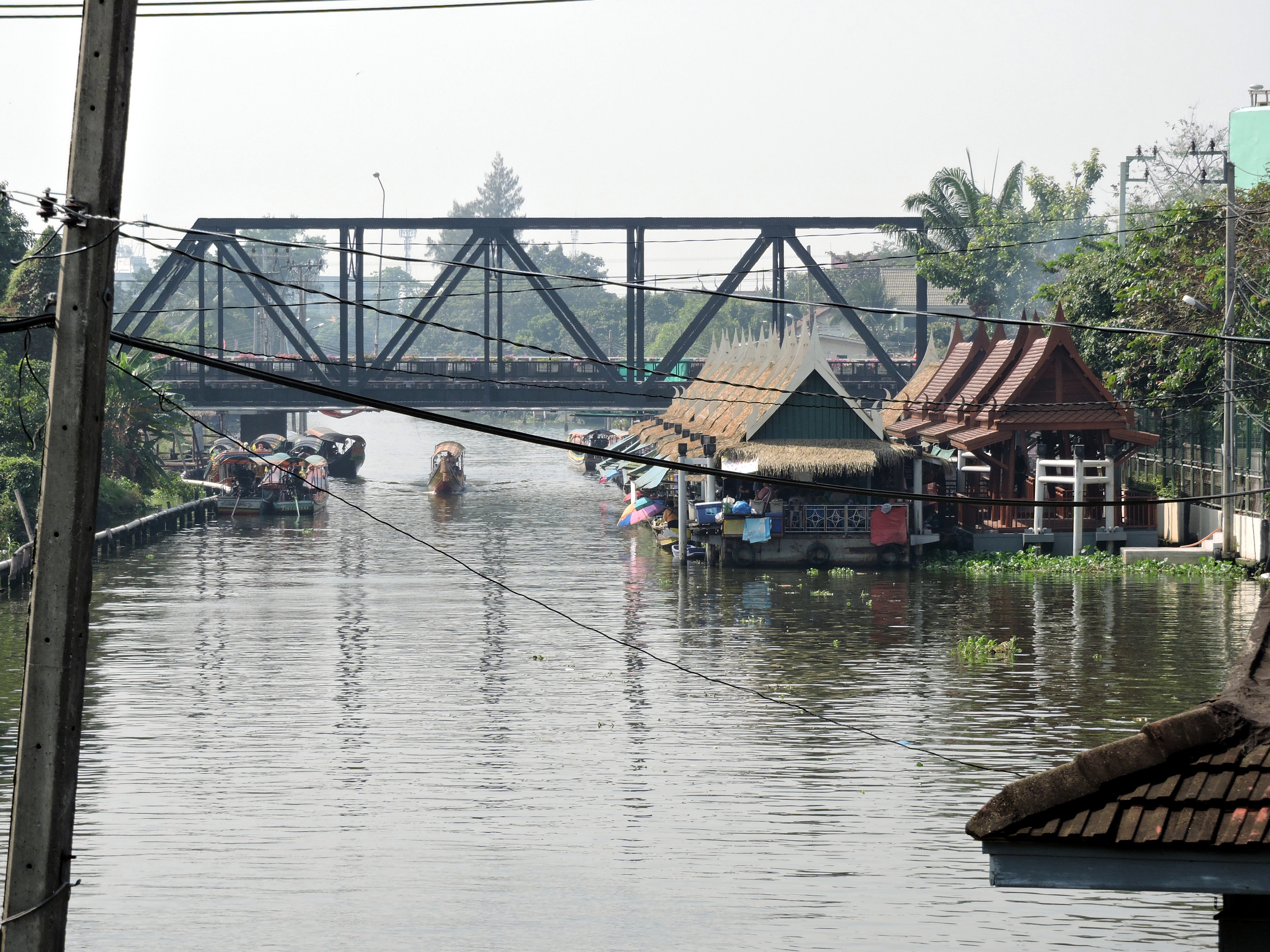
- Khlong Chak Phra section that flows through Taling Chan Floating Market

Specifications
- Length: 5.45 km (3.39 miles)

Geography
- Start point: Bangkok Noi
- End point: Taling Chan
- Connects to: Bangkok Noi, Ban Sai, Bang Ramat, Bang Phrom, Mon and Bangkok Yai canals

Khlong Chak Phra (Thai: คลองชักพระ, pronounced [kʰlɔ̄ːŋ t͡ɕʰák pʰráʔ]) is a khlong (canal) in Bangkok's Thonburi area. It branches off from Khlong Bangkok Noi in front of Wat Suwan Keree and flows until it meets the confluence of Khlong Mon and Khlong Bangkok Yai. Throughout its entire length, it serves as the boundary between Bangkok Noi and Taling Chan Districts. The canal is about 10–15 m (36–49 ft) wide and 5.45 km (3 mi) long. Like Khlong Bangkok Yai and Khlong Bangkok Noi, Khlong Chak Phra is a natural waterway formed from an old course of the Chao Phraya River during the Ayutthaya period.

Its name, meaning "Pulling the Buddha Canal," derives from the annual Chak Phra tradition. In this ceremony, Buddha relics and statues are taken from Wat Nang Chi in Phasi Charoen District and placed on a flower-decorated barge. The procession travels from Khlong Dan, turns into Khlong Bangkok Yai, continues through Khlong Bangkok Noi, passes Wat Kai Tia along Khlong Chak Phra, and concludes at the Taling Chan District Office. This festival takes place annually on the second day of the waning moon in the twelfth lunar month and is the only Chak Phra ceremony still observed in Bangkok.

The canal has also been known by other names, including Khlong Bang Khun Si (คลองบางขุนศรี) and Maenam Bang Khun Si (แม่น้ำบางขุนศรี).

Today, the canal is best known as the site of the Taling Chan Floating Market, located near the Taling Chan District Office and the Southern Railway Line. It is the largest market in the area. The name Khlong Chak Phra also lives on as the name of two Bangkok subdistricts: Khlong Chak Phra in Taling Chan District and Bang Khun Si in Bangkok Noi District.
