= Bang Phrom subdistrict, Bangkok =

Coordinates: 13°45′08.0″N 100°26′30.4″E

Bang Phrom บางพรม
- Khwaeng
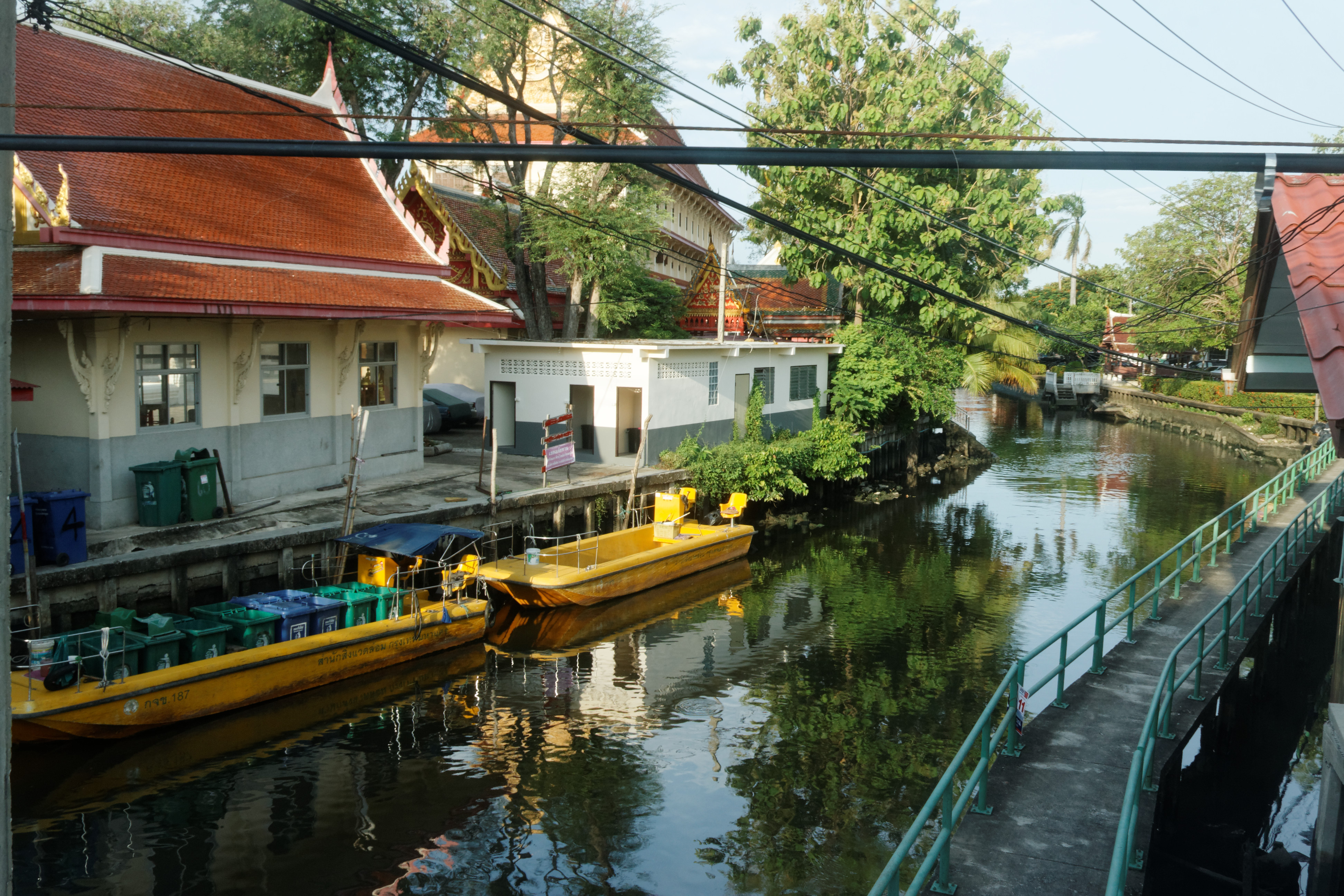
- Khlong Bang Phrom, an eponymous (Bang Phrom area is right side, left side is Wat Kanchana Singhat in Khlong Chak Phra area)

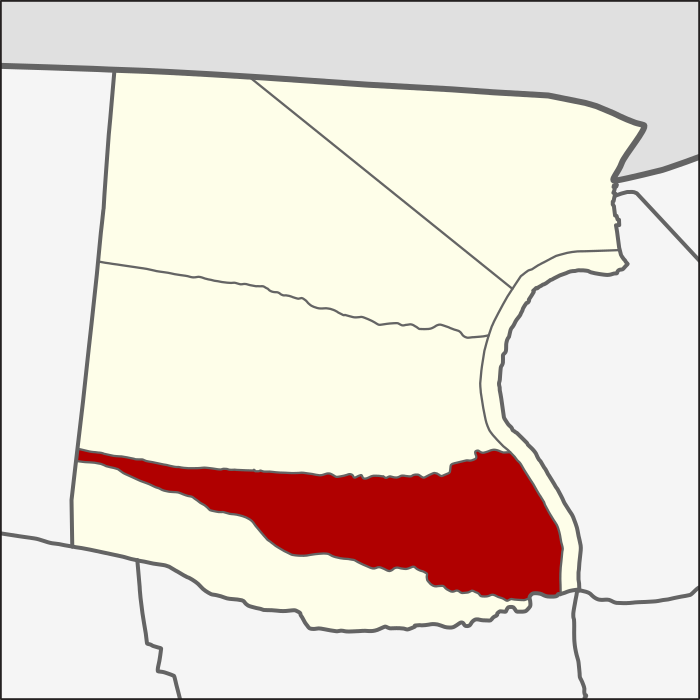
- Location in Taling Chan District
- Country: Thailand
- Province: Bangkok
- Khet: Taling Chan

Area
  - Total: 4.253 km^{2} (1.642 sq mi)

Population (2020)
  - Total: 13,553
- Time zone: UTC+7 (ICT)
- Postal code: 10170
- TIS 1099: 101904

Bang Phrom (Thai: บางพรม, pronounced [bāːŋ pʰrōm]) is a khwaeng (subdistrict) of Taling Chan district, Bangkok's Thonburi side.

== History ==
It is named after Khlong Bang Phrom, a khlong (canal) that runs through the northern part and a dividing line between its area with neighbouring Bang Ramat. The khlong flows away from Khlong Chak Phra to the west up till it meets Khlong Thawi Watthana, total length 14 km (8.7 mi).

In the past, Bang Phrom used to be a rice planting area and there was a wide area extending to neighbouring subdistricts such as Bang Ramat. Local farmers therefore paid respects to Phosop (goddess of rice) and there was a shrine dedicated to her that still exists today inside Wat Siri Watthanaram at the confluence of three khlongs: Bang Phrom, Lat Ta Niao, and Latmayom. Also on those days, they would have a ceremony to invite the Phosop statue procession to the various khlongs in Taling Chan at around 09.00 am where they would enshrine it in the local temple and have a complete celebration all night. Later the next day, they would go back by passing Khlong Bang Chueak Nang.

Her original statue is rumored to be gold. It was stolen by three men from outside the area circa the late 1970s and until today, this original statue has not been found.

Most local rice mill owners were Chinese.

Unfortunately, Bang Phrom does not currently have rice fields anymore. The last rice fields were dissolved around 1983.

In the year 1940, Bang Phrom consisted of 20 mubans (villages).

It contained 15 administrative villages until the dissolution of administrative villages in the area of Bangkok.

== Geography ==
Bang Phrom can be considered as the southeast part of the district, with a total area of 4.253 km^{2} (1.642 sq mi).

Neighbouring subdistricts are (from the north clockwise): Bang Ramat and Khlong Chak Phra in its district, Khuha Sawan of Phasi Charoen district, Bang Chueak Nang in its district, and Thawi Watthana of Thawi Watthana district, respectively.

Like other areas of Taling Chan, Bang Phrom is filled with many ancient temples and agricultural areas. There is a total of 1,182 rai (189.1 ha; 467 acres) of agricultural land.

Bang Phrom is an area that is easily accessible from Soi Charan Sanit Wong 35 in Bang Khun Si subdistrict, Bangkok Noi district and also consists of many roads.

The eponymous Khlong Bang Phrom is the main watercourse of the area. It starts in the eastern side of the area, at the mouth of the course is the location of two temples that are paired together, Wat Ratchada Thitthan Ratchaworawihan (Wat Ngoen) and the opposite side Wat Kanchana Singhat (Wat Thong – situated in the Khlong Chak Phra subdistrict), then flows as far as Thawi Watthana area.

== Places ==
- Wat Krachom Thong
- Wat Kaeo
- Wat Thep Phon
- Wat Prasat
- Wat Phleng (Klang Suan)
- Wat Siri Watthanaram
- Wat Saphan
- Wat Saphan Floating Market
- Ratchaphruek Road
- Phran Nok–Phutthamonthon Sai 4 Road
- KIP Complex
