= Bang Ramat railway halt =

Railway halt in Bangkok, Thailand

Coordinates: 13.778509°N 100.453515°E

Bang Ramat บางระมาด
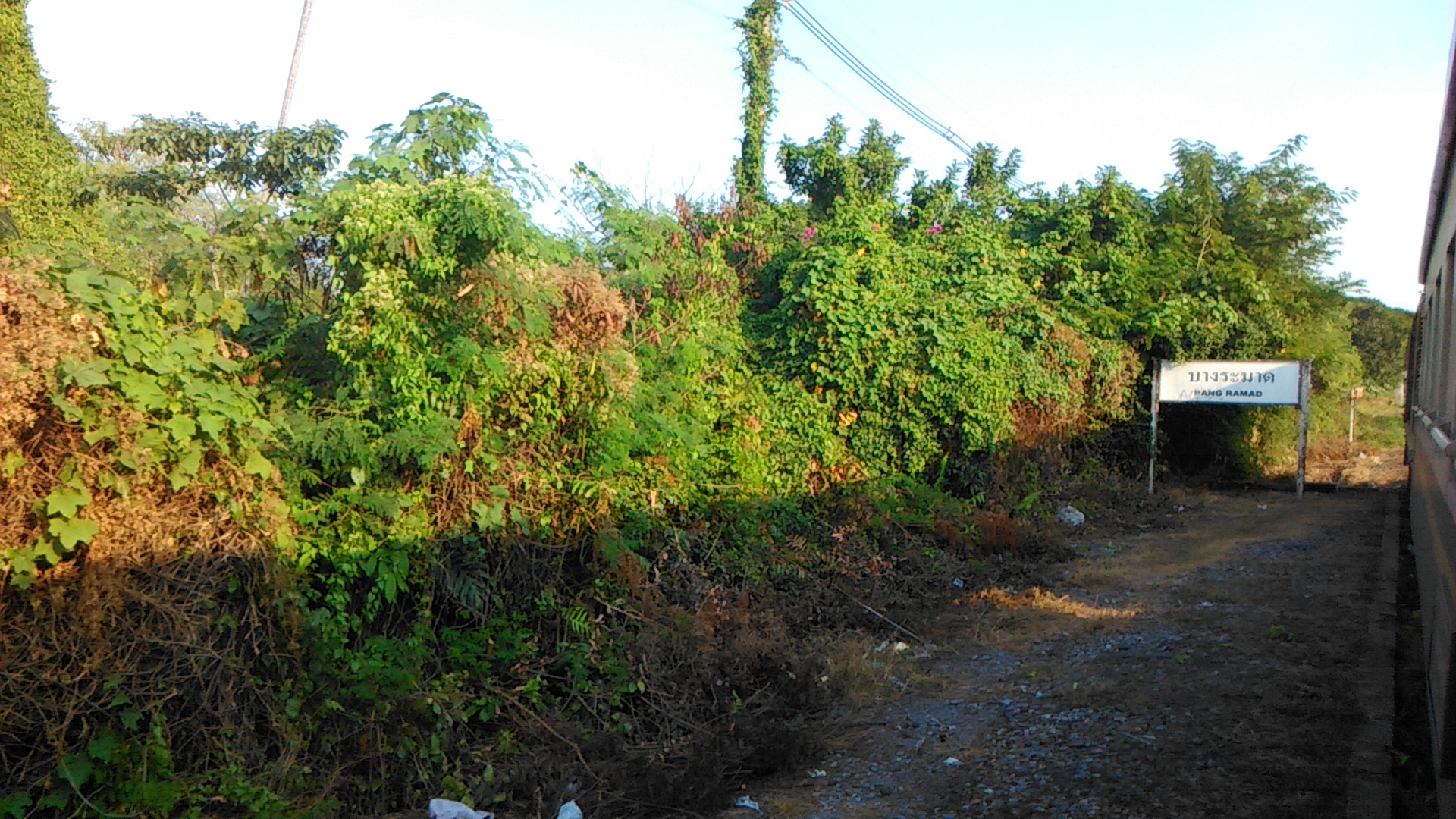

General information
- Location: Chimphli Subdistrict, Taling Chan District; Bangkok; Thailand
- Operator: State Railway of Thailand
- Manager: Ministry of Transport
- Line: Thon Buri Line
- Distance: 4.29 km (2.7 mi) from Thon Buri
- Platforms: 1
- Tracks: 1

Construction
- Structure type: At-grade

Other information
- Classification: Halt

Services
Preceding station	State Railway of Thailand	Following station
Charansanitwong Halt towards Thon Buri	Southern Line Thon Buri Line	Taling Chan Terminus
Location

Bang Ramat railway halt (Thai: บางระมาด) is a railway halt located in Chimphli Subdistrict, Taling Chan District, Bangkok, Thailand. It is 4.29 km (2.7 mi) from Thon Buri railway station.
