= Oliang =

Thai iced coffee drink

Oliang (left) and roselle drink (right), traditional Thai beverages commonly found in Thai restaurants and food stalls throughout Thailand.

Traditional Thai drinks commonly found in food courts, markets, and restaurants throughout Thailand. From left to right: Chrysanthemum tea, Oliang, Roselle juice, Thai black tea

Oliang (Thai: โอเลี้ยง, pronounced [ʔōːlía̯ŋ], also spelt oleang and olieng), commonly known as Thai iced coffee, is a popular Thai beverage. Oliang is prepared from a mixture of Robusta coffee grounds, brown sugar, and various grains and seeds like cardamom, corn, soybeans, rice, and sesame seeds. The drink is noted for its coffee aroma and smoky notes from high-roasted grains and seeds.

== Origins ==
The name oliang is derived from the Teochew Chinese pronunciation of 烏涼 (Pe̍h-ōe-jī: o͘-liâng), which literally means "black and iced," in reference to the black iced coffee concoction. Teochews comprise the majority of the Thai Chinese population.

== Preparation ==
Traditionally, oliang is brewed with a Thai coffee filter called tungdtom (Thai: ถุงต้ม), a tea/coffee sock with a metal ring and handle to which a cotton cloth bag is attached. It is also used for making Thai tea. To make Thai coffee, put the oliang into the coffee sock and pour boiling water through it into a carafe. Let the bag steep for approximately 10 minutes until strong. Oliang is sometimes served with condensed milk, or with a small pitcher of evaporated milk, and one of simple syrup with which the drinker can sweeten the oliang to their taste.

== Variations ==
Oliang can be customized as follows:

- Black coffee with ice = oliang (โอเลี้ยง)
- Black coffee with condensed milk = kopi (โกปี๊)
- Black coffee with ice and fresh milk = oliang yok lor (โอเลี้ยงยกล้อ)
- Black coffee with condensed milk, ice, and fresh milk = kafae yen (กาแฟเย็น)

== See also ==
- List of coffee beverages
- Thai tea
