= Siriraj Piyamaharajkarun Hospital =

Siriraj Piyamaharajkarun Hospital โรงพยาบาลศิริราช ปิยมหาราชการุณย์

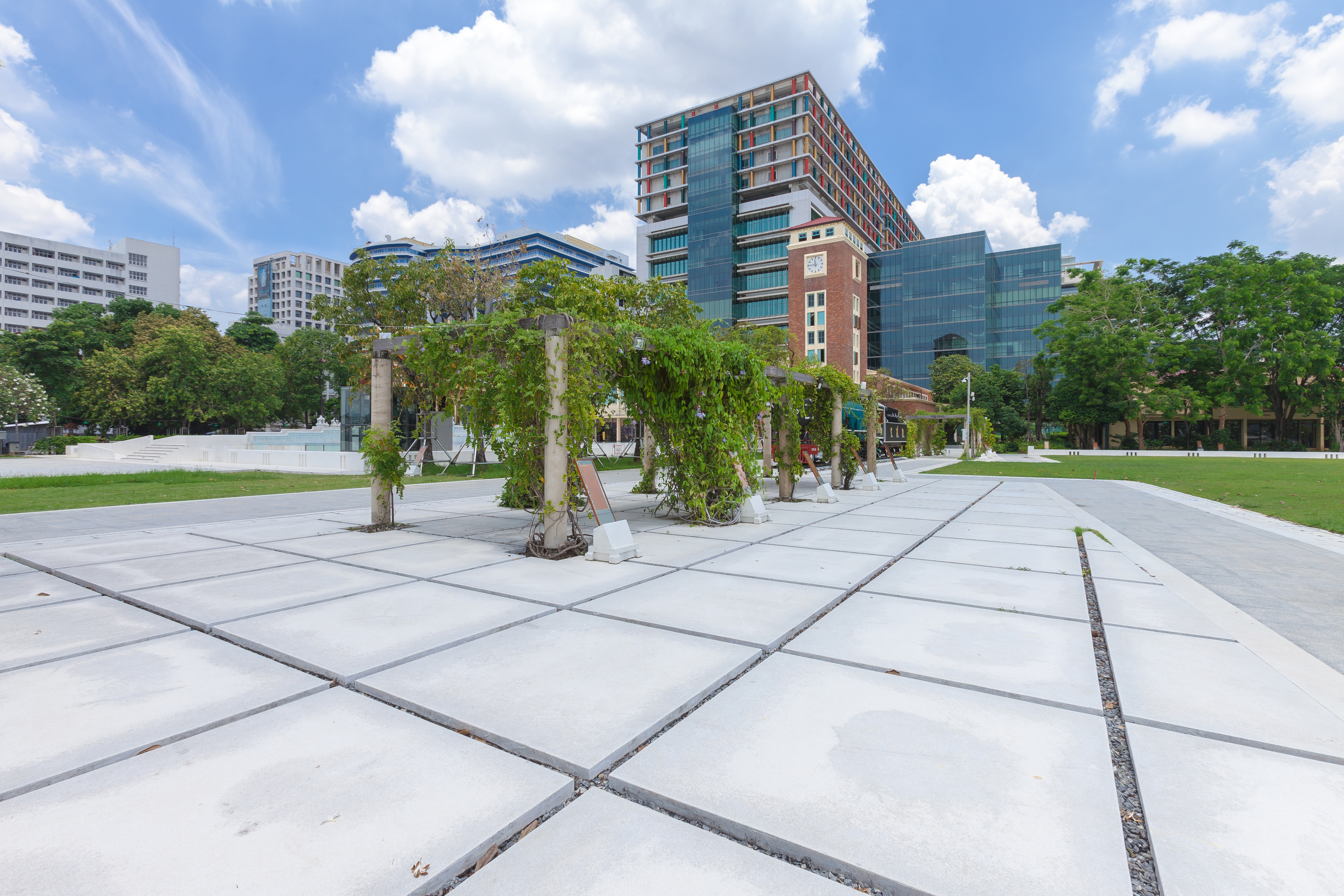
- The Park in Siriraj Bimuksthan Museum in Siriraj Piyamaharajkarun Hospital

Geography
- Location: 2 Wang Lang Road, Siriraj Subdistrict, Bangkok Noi, Bangkok, Thailand
- Coordinates: 13.759621°N 100.485931°E

Organisation
- Care system: National Health Insurance System
- Type: Teaching, District General
- Affiliated university: Faculty of Medicine Siriraj Hospital, Mahidol University

Services
- Emergency department: Yes
- Beds: 402

History
- Founded: 26 April 2012 (opened)

Links
- Website: Official website
- Lists: Hospitals in Thailand

Siriraj Piyamaharajkarun Hospital (SiPH) (Thai: โรงพยาบาลศิริราช ปิยมหาราชการุณย์) is a private hospital operated by the Faculty of Medicine Siriraj Hospital of Mahidol University. It is located in Bangkok on the west bank of the Chao Phraya River, adjacent to Siriraj Hospital and opposite Thammasat University (Tha Phra Chan Campus). The hospital is catered to high-income patients, similarly to Thailand's private hospitals, with one of its aims being to generate revenue for the operation of Siriraj Hospital.

== History ==
The Faculty of Medicine Siriraj Hospital, Mahidol University was transferred a piece of land adjacent to the Chao Phraya River from the State Railway of Thailand following the board resolutions since 2003 from the cabinet and State Railway of Thailand, and finally on 11 January 2010 with an area of 33 rai, 2 ngan, and 94 square wa (53,976 square meters). King Bhumibol Adulyadej graciously conferred Princess Sirindhorn to lay the foundation stone for the building part of the project 'Siriraj towards a top medical institute in Southeast Asia' around the old Bangkok Noi railway station and named the building 'Piyamaharajkarun Building'. On 6 July 2010, the Faculty of Medicine board renamed the building as 'Siriraj Piyamaharajkarun Hospital (SiPH)'. The hospital opened on 26 April 2012.

== Facilities ==
Siriraj Piyamaharajkarun operates the following special medical centers:

- Orthopaedic Center
- Heart Center
- Gastrointestinal and Liver Center
- Cancer Center
- Kidney Center
- Children Center
- Eye Center
- Ear Nose Throat Center
- Allergy Center
- Health Checkup Clinic
- Skin Center
- Internal Medicine Center
- General Surgery Center
- Rehabilitation Center
- Dental Center
- X-Ray Center
- Cardiac Rehabilitation Center
- Women Center
- Diabetes, Thyroid and Endocrine Clinic
- Emergency Clinic

== See also ==
- Siriraj Hospital
- Health in Thailand
- Hospitals in Thailand
- List of hospitals in Thailand
