= Kamsuan Samut =

Thai poem

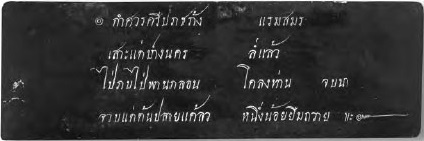
Afterword stanza of an early Rattanakosin samut khoi copy, referring to the work as Kamsuan Siprat

Kamsuan Samut (Thai: กำสรวลสมุทร, pronounced [kām.sǔan sā.mùt]), translated into English as Ocean Lament, is a poem of around 520 lines in Thai in the khlong si meter. It concerns a man who leaves the old Siamese capital of Ayutthaya and travels in a small boat down the Chao Phraya River and out into the Gulf of Thailand. Along the way he laments over his parting from a lover who he calls Si Chulalak, perhaps the name of a royal consort. The reason for his flight and his destination are not explained. The extant poem ends abruptly, although there might have been a longer variant. The work is considered a precursor or pioneer of the nirat genre of Thai poetry. The authorship, dating and original title of the poem are unknown and have been subjects of academic debate. The poem was once attributed to a court poet named Si Prat in the reign of King Narai (r. 1656–1688), but this is now considered doubtful. The poem was first printed in 1950. It is considered a gem of old Thai literature because of the intensity of the poet's expression of loss and the elegance of the verse.

== Title ==
Kamsuan (Thai: กำสรวล) is a word of Khmer origin meaning sorrow. Samut (Thai: สมุทร) comes from samudda, a Pali word for ocean. This title appears in Chindamani, a literary manual from the 17th century CE. P. n. Pramuanmarg first associated this title with this poem in 1959.

== Manuscripts and publication ==
In the early 19th century, the poem was referenced by other poets, Phraya Trang and Narin In, but remained unpublished and little known. By 1950, there were six samut thai manuscripts in the National Library of Thailand and others in private possession. These vary in wording, spelling, and in the number and sequence of the verses, suggesting that the work may have survived in fragments, subsequently reassembled, but all the manuscripts appear to stem from the same original.

After an opening verse in the rai meter, the remainder is in khlong si meter, mostly in the bat kunchon (elephant line) variant. In this form there is usually a rhyme linking one verse to the next. In around 14 places, this link is missing, possibly because verses have been added or been lost. There is no critical edition comparing the variations in the manuscripts.

The first printed edition appeared in 1950, edited by Chanthit Krasaesin. He used nine manuscripts, and reported:

Each one is different, in wording and meaning ... every manuscript is faulty in one way or another ... some verses are beyond my wisdom to understand ... The language is the language of poetry, which enormously increases the difficulty of interpreting the meaning. After reading, I did not understand fully and had to surmise and research in old books of a similar age ... I still have to use some estimation and guesswork as well. As such there has to be some things wrong, some right as a matter of course.

Several other editions followed: by Phra Worawetphisit, the long-time dean of Thai literature at Chulalongkorn University, in 1958; by P. n. Pramuanmarg, a pen-name of the historian and litterateur MC Chand Chirayu Rajani, in 1959; by Dhanit Yupho, the former head of the Fine Arts Department, in 1960; by Lalana Siricharoen in 1970; by Sujit Wongthes and a team from the Matichon publishing group in 2006; and by Winai Pongsripian in 2010. Dhanit’s edition was included in the Fine Arts Department’s 3-volume Wannakam samai ayutthaya (Literature of the Ayutthaya era), published in 1987 and 2002.

== Characters ==
The male speaker is evidently of elite rank. A mass of servant girls “fill the bank” when he boards the boat to leave Ayutthaya.

In two places, he addresses his parted lover as Si Chulalak (Thai: ศรีจุฬาลักษณ์), which was the official name of a royal consort, but also could simply mean “fine-featured.”

There is no other usage of distinctive language that identifies the characters as royal.

== Synopsis ==
The introduction celebrates the city of Ayutthaya for the glory of its temples and palaces and the achievements of past kings. Five charming verses celebrate the city as a haven for lovers to meet in the evenings.

At verse 13, the speaker boards a boat to leave Ayutthaya without saying farewell to his lover. The reason for his departure is not explained. From here onward the poem is couched as a message to the lover.

He travels southward in a boat with a small crew. Some believe the boat is named Khading thong, Gold or Bronze Bell, which appears in verse 109. Along the way he names around 40 places of which around 30 can be identified. He passes down the Chao Phraya River to the estuary and out into the Gulf of Thailand. The last identifiable places are Sichang Island and Bamboo Island on the eastern shore of the Gulf. The destination of the journey is unknown.

The speaker records fauna seen along the way including deer, buffalo, wild ox, rhinoceros and several species of birds. He also comments on the watery landscape of lakes and creeks, the low sky, gardens full of flowers and fruit, masses of jasmine, the flatness of the plain, the coastline, and the surface of the sea. In the Gulf he describes the distinctive feeding of a Bryde’s whale, as well as dolphins and several species of fish.

In the Gulf, he encounters a storm which damages the boat and makes him fear for his life. After he makes a plea to the gods, the storm recedes.

In the final verse, he instructs his lover:

Keep this letter under your pillow, beloved.
Don't just read it for fun.
Let it be your companion in bed,
Every night, my love, every night. (tr. Manas Chitakasem)

== Poetic technique ==
The poet uses a wide range of techniques and devices to express his love and appreciation of the distant beloved.

In their classical form, nirat are poems based on a journey where sights, events, and place-names along the way trigger an association with a parted lover. The genre was popular in the 19th century, especially in the work of Sunthorn Phu.

In this poem, around half of the place-names mentioned trigger an association with the speaker’s lover. Some trigger a physical memory and appreciation. For example Bang Khadan (Thai: บางขดาน), the “Village of Planks,” reminds the speaker of her flat belly. Others recall an event. For example, Mango Village (Thai: กรยนสวาย) reminds him or her hands slicing a mango for him. These passage occur mostly in the early part of the poem.

Other place-names are just mentioned in passing. Some prompt the descriptions typical of a literary traveler. At Khom Phreng (Thai: ขอมเพรง) he recounts the tale of a curious accidental death which gave rise to the village’s name. At Chamangrai (Thai: ฉมงงราย), he sketches the scene of a fishing village and a busy fresh market. At Bang Nai Yi (Thai: บางนายญี่) he describes his boat crew getting drunk

The nirat-like passages are not the only devices deployed to display the speaker’s love for the parted lover. Other devices used are: showing jealousy of other men or gods enjoying her charms during his absence; recalling her physical beauty, especially the slimness of her waist, the flatness of her belly, and the beauty of its “navel flower”; remembering their love-play; calling on gods, spirits, trees, animals and the sky to convey his messages to her; wishing to divide his body into two parts so one can remain with her; and admiring other women along the way but ultimately finding them less beautiful. Several of these techniques are also found in Thawathotsamat from the same era.

The speaker repeatedly describes the physical distress caused by his parting from the lover, particularly felt by his stomach, intestine, kidney and liver, but also by his breast, eyes, and teeth.

The speaker draws comparisons with other stories about parted lovers including Rama and Sita from the Ramayana tradition, and Sudhanu and Samutthakhot from the Paññāsa Jātaka.

A sample verse (77):

๗๗ รฦกแก้วกินสี้	นางสอง ไซ้แม่
อร่อยสรทึกถนำ	ปากป้อน
จนนทน์จรุงออกธารทา	ยงงรุ่ง
บยายยวเนื้อร้อน	เร่งวี ฯ

I think back to the two of us trysting, my jewel,
the taste of betel, mouth to mouth,
the scent of your sandal rousing through to dawn,
me unfazed by flesh on fire, you fanning hard.

== The romance of Si Prat ==
From the late 18th century, the poem was associated with a court poet named Si Prat.

In the testimony of the Ayutthaya, nobles swept away to Burma after the fall of Ayutthaya in 1767, there is a story about a court poet, Si Prat, who was exiled from Ayutthaya to Nakhon Si Thammarat as punishment for romancing a court lady. When he then romanced one of the governor’s wives, the governor condemned him to death. Just before his execution, Si Prat pronounced a curse: “Let this sword that kills me later kill the person who had it kill me.” When the Ayutthaya king wanted to have Si Prat return and found out he had been killed, he indeed had the governor executed.

This story does not mention the poem. However, by the early 19th century, the Bangkok poets, Phraya Trang and Narin In, assumed that this poem was written by Si Prat on his journey into exile at Nakhon Si Thammarat.

In 1919, Phraya Pariyati Thamthada (Phae Talalakshmana), a provincial intellectual who came under the patronage of the Bangkok court, published an elaborate version of the Si Prat story and the composition of this poem, adding a lot of detail and drama without citing any sources.

In the early editions of the poem and the early textbooks on Thai literature, the poem was titled Kamsuan Siprat (กำสรวลศรีปราชญ์ [kām.sǔan sǐː.pràːt]), the lament or wailing of Si Prat, and was dated to the reign of King Narai (1656–1688) or King Sua (also known as Sorasak or Suriyenthrathibodi, r.1703–1709). The story of Si Prat was further elaborated to have Si Prat writing his final curse with a toe in the sand while blindfolded and tied to a stake. This verse, as recorded by Phraya Pariyati Thamthada without any provenance, became one of the best known excerpts of old Thai poetry.

In 1947, MR Sumonachat Sawatdikhun proposed that the language of the poem resembled works dated around 1500, such as Thawathotsamat and Yuan Phai, rather than works of the Narai reign.

In his 1959 edition, P. n. Pramuanmarg pointed out that there was no mention of Si Prat in any historical source from Ayutthaya or Nakhon Si Thammarat, and suggested the story was a romantic fiction. On grounds that the beloved has the name of a royal consort, he argued that the poem was written by Boromracha, the son and successor of King Trailokkanat (1448–1488)), between 1482 and 1491, and he identified the poem with Kamsuan Samut, a title found in Chindamani, a 17th century literary manual.

Manit Wallipodom, head of the archaeology section of the Fine Arts Department, traced the place-names found in the poem, showing that the boat followed two long loops in the Chao Phraya River which were cut off by shortcut canals dug in 1542 and 1635 respectively. He argued that the poem must predate those canals.

As a result of these findings on the language, route, and lack of historical sources, academic opinion now rejects the Si Prat story. The editions by Sujit Wongthes in 2006 and Winai Pongsripian in 2010 both adopt the title Kamsuan Samut and argue that the Si Prat story is a myth.

== Academic study ==
Thai-language studies have focused on the issues of dating and authorship with little attention to other aspects of the poem. Western-language studies have focused on the poem’s role as a pioneer of the nirat genre.

In a 1972 article and 1974 thesis, Manas Chitakasem wrote:

Khlōng Kamsuan Sīprāt has thus served as the model for Khlōng Nirāt composition. It emerges as the representative of a new genre in Thai poetry in which the poet clearly seeks to express his personal experience of love separation and longing during an actual journey.

Gilles Delouche also identified Kamsuan Samut as the origin of the nirat genre. Paul McBain wrote that "The poem is considered the archetypal nirat poem, one which has been imitated again and again."

== Critical assessment ==
The poem has been variously described as a "masterpiece", "(an example of) heightened realism and sensuality", and "one of the most widely imitated nirats in the 17th and 18th (centuries)".
