= Taling Chan district =

Taling Chan ตลิ่งชัน
- Khet
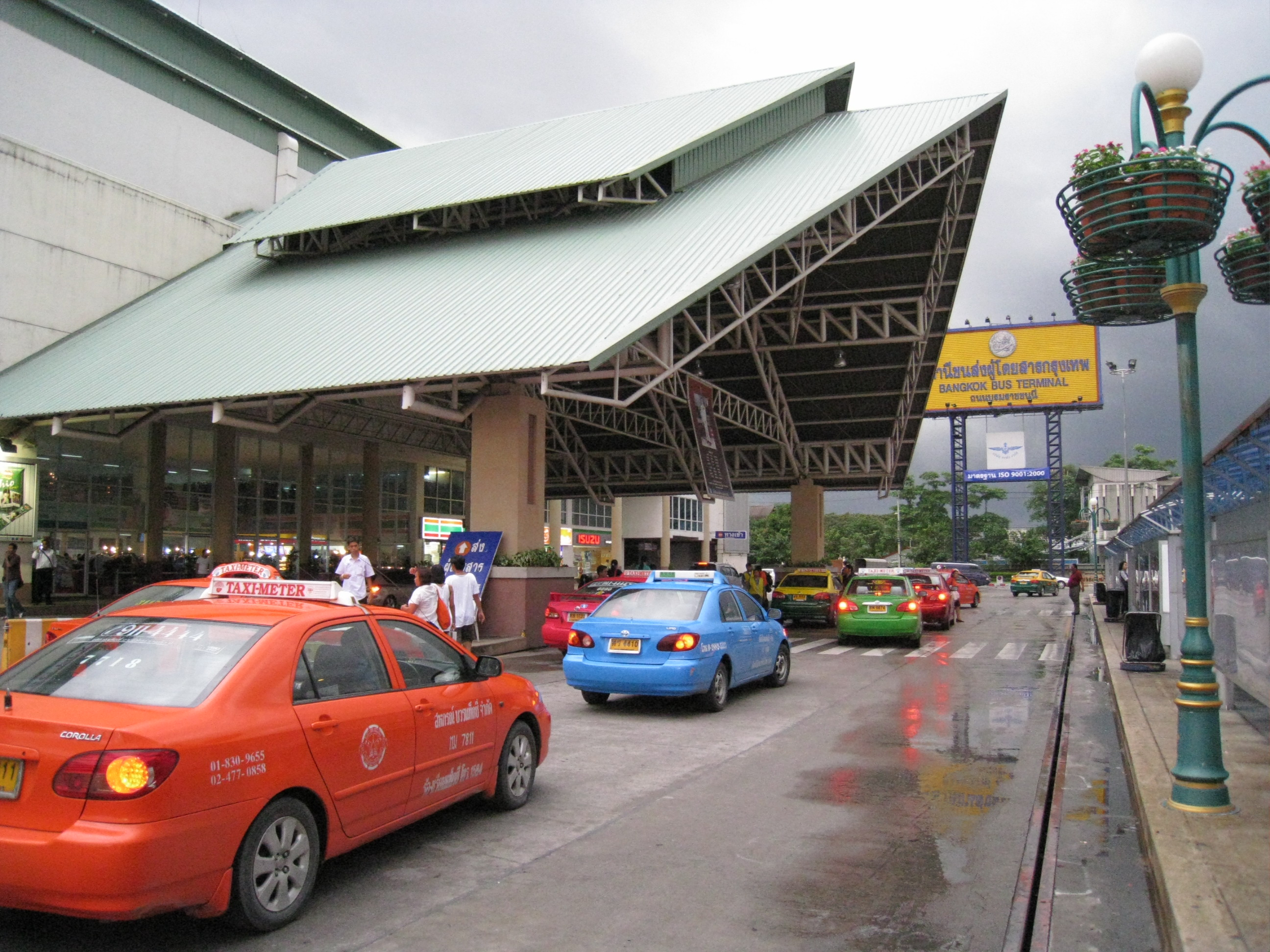
- New Southern Bus Terminal, a bus terminal in Taling Chan

- Khet location in Bangkok
- Coordinates: 13°46′37″N 100°27′24″E
- Country: Thailand
- Province: Bangkok
- Seat: Khlong Chak Phra
- Khwaeng: 6

Area
  - Total: 29.479 km^{2} (11.382 sq mi)

Population (2017)
  - Total: 105,299
  - Density: 3,572/km^{2} (9,250/sq mi)
- Time zone: UTC+7 (ICT)
- Postal code: 10170
- Geocode: 1019

Taling Chan (Thai: ตลิ่งชัน, pronounced [tā.lìŋ tɕʰān]) is one of the 50 districts (khet) of Bangkok, Thailand. Its neighbours, clockwise from the north, are Bang Kruai district of Nonthaburi province and Bang Phlat, Bangkok Noi, Bangkok Yai, Phasi Charoen, Bang Khae, and Thawi Watthana Districts of Bangkok.

== History ==
Taling Chan is an old district, dating back to the time when Thonburi was a separate province; now, Thonburi has merged into Bangkok. In 1998, part of the district was split off to form the new Thawi Watthana district. Historically, much of the area was used as orchards and kitchen gardens, many of which remain today; it has been called "Bangkok's Kitchen."

About 1,000 years ago, the landscape of Taling Chan is believed to have been part of the Chao Phraya river delta, consisting of muddy mangrove forests with no evidence of human settlement.

Two areas of Taling Chan, Bang Ramat and Bang Chueak Nang, were mentioned in the Kamsuan Samut of the Ayutthaya period; they are regarded as among Bangkok's oldest zones.

During World War II, a southern railway line running through the district was one of the targets of Allied bombing.

Taling Chan covers a rectangular area and is intersected by many waterways. It is an agricultural area, which makes access by road difficult. Today, many roads pass through the district, such as Kanchanaphisek, Borommaratchachonnani, Ratchaphruek, Phutthamonthon Sai 1, and Phran Nok-Phutthamonthon Sai 4; however, the most convenient route is still by water. Taling Chan is served by both BMTA and affiliated buses, but only on a few lines. There was no electricity in the area until 1972.

== Administration ==
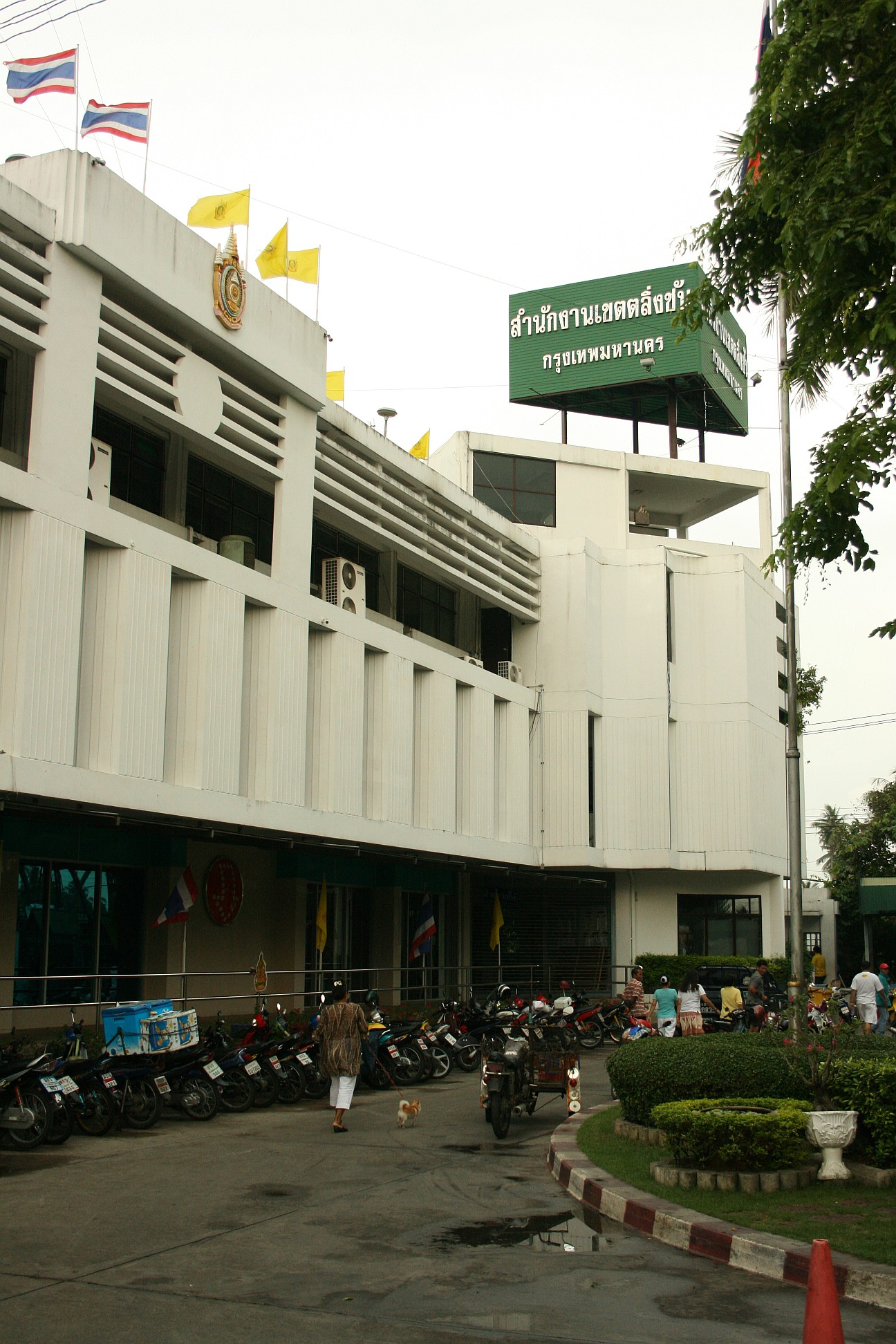
District office

The district is divided into six sub-districts (khwaeng).

No.	Name	Thai	Area (km^{2})	Map
1.	Khlong Chak Phra	คลองชักพระ	1.251	Map
2.	Taling Chan	ตลิ่งชัน	5.183	Map
3.	Chimphli	ฉิมพลี	7.338	Map
4.	Bang Phrom	บางพรม	4.253	Map
5.	Bang Ramat	บางระมาด	8.539	Map
7.	Bang Chueak Nang	บางเชือกหนัง	2.915	Map
Total			29.479	Map

The missing number 6 belongs to the sub-district which was split off to form Thawi Watthana district.

== Places ==
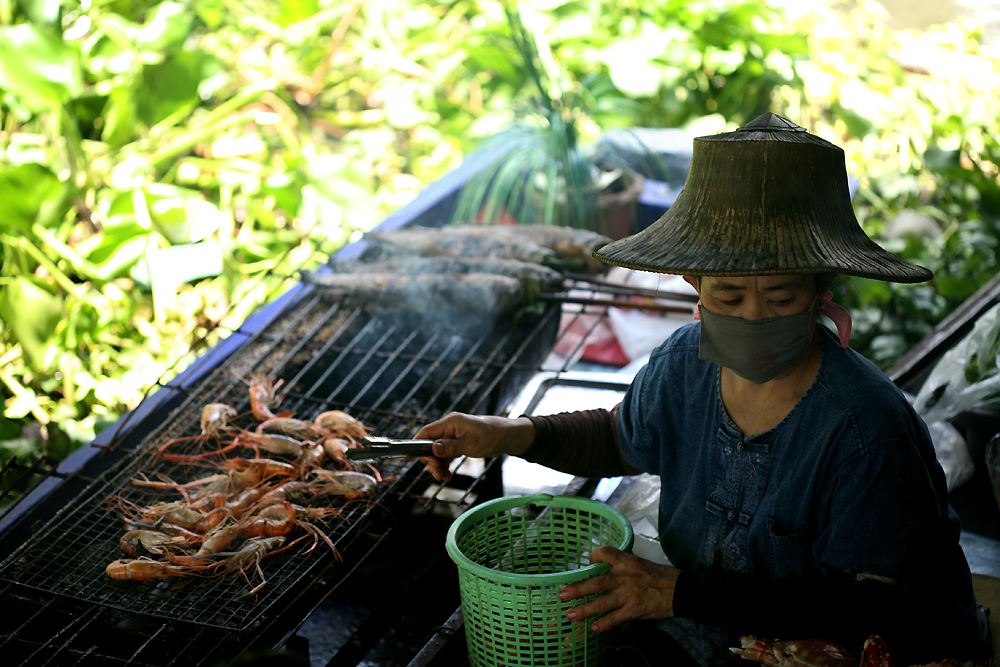
Taling Chan floating market

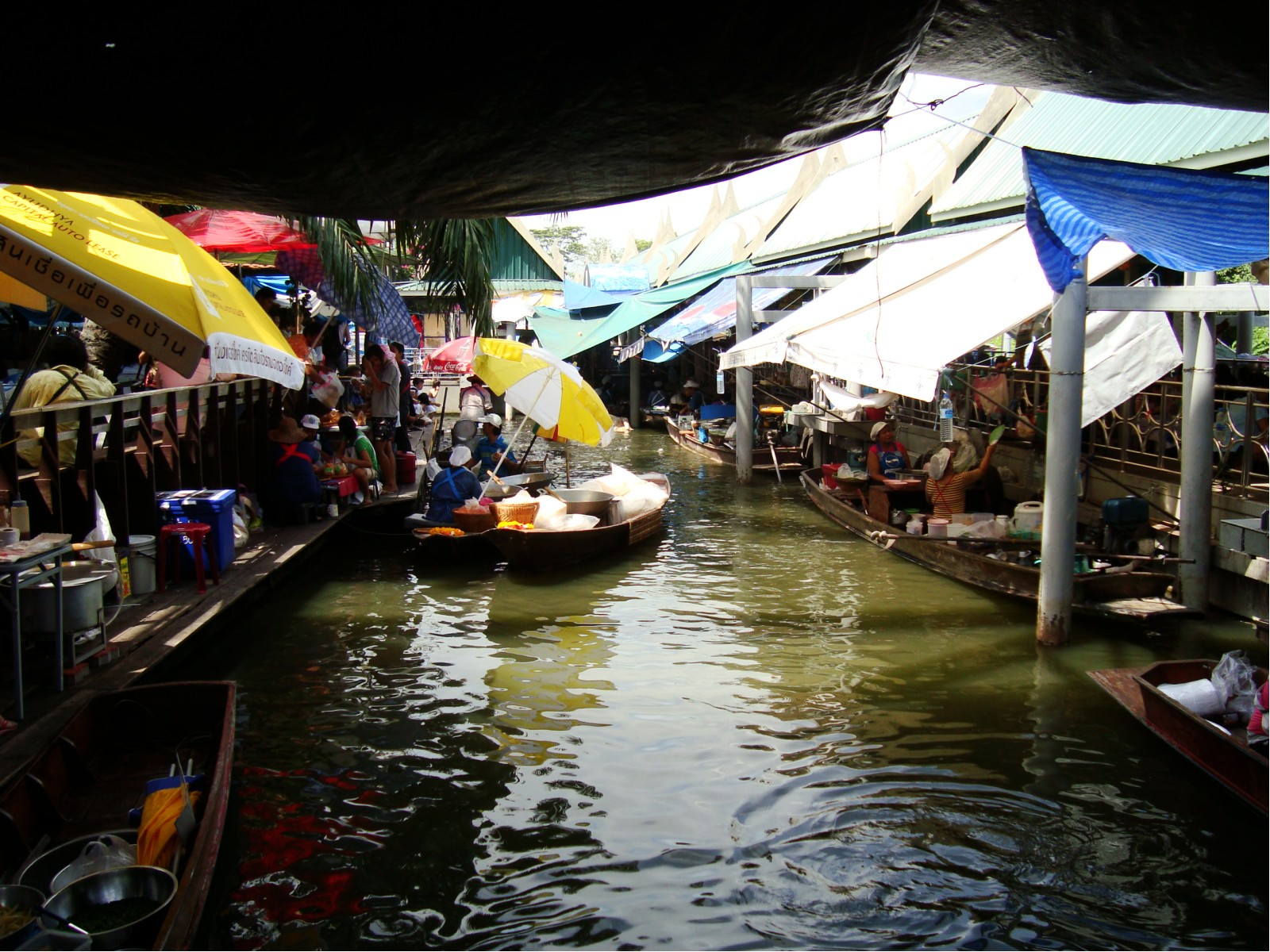
Floating market in Taling Chan

Taling Chan Floating Market is on the canal Khlong Chak Phra (คลองชักพระ) Canal in front of the district office. It is open only on weekends from about 08:30 to 16:00. Orchard produce such as fruits, and vegetables, as well as fish are sold from boats. There is a live traditional Thai music performance from 11:00 to 14:00. The idea for the floating market here was initiated by Chamlong Srimuang in 1987 to honour King Bhumibol's 60th birthday. This is a new attraction since floating markets, an old way of life of the Thai people, had vanished entirely from Bangkok for quite a long time.

In addition, There are also 4–5 other floating markets in the district, including Wat Champa Floating Market, which is on the way to Khlong Bang Ramat (คลองบางระมาด). Here, locals have a traditional way of life and preserve like the past. Now, there is a homestay in cultural tourism form for tourists.

Flower Market Thailand is a new center flower trade of Thailand apart from Pak Khlong Talat in Phra Nakhon.

== Accident ==
In 1979, 54 people were killed in the worst accident in Thai railway history when a commuter train collided with a freight train at Taling Chan.
