= Khao mor =

Thai gardening style

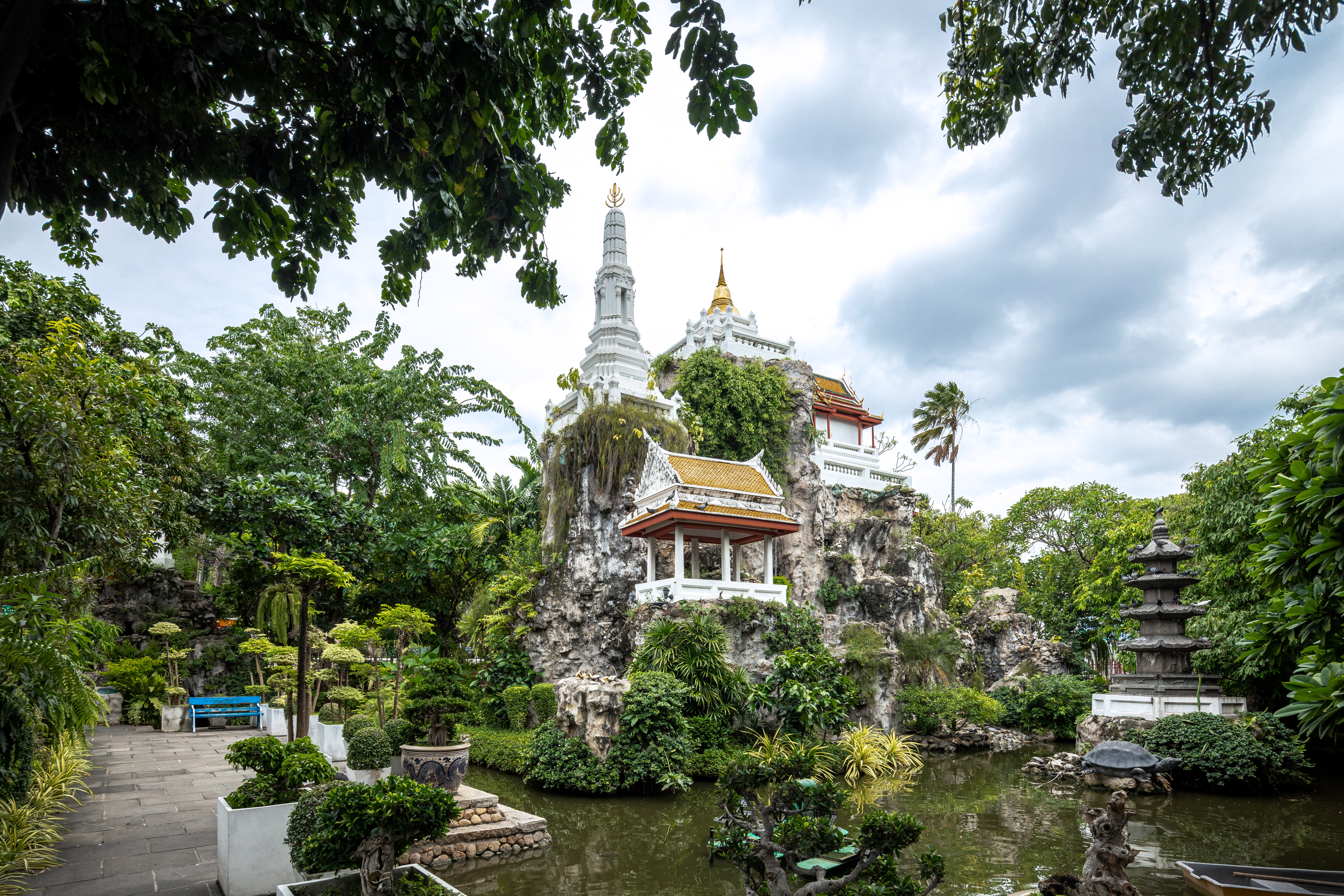
Khao mor and Thai garden at Wat Prayurawongsawat in september 2024

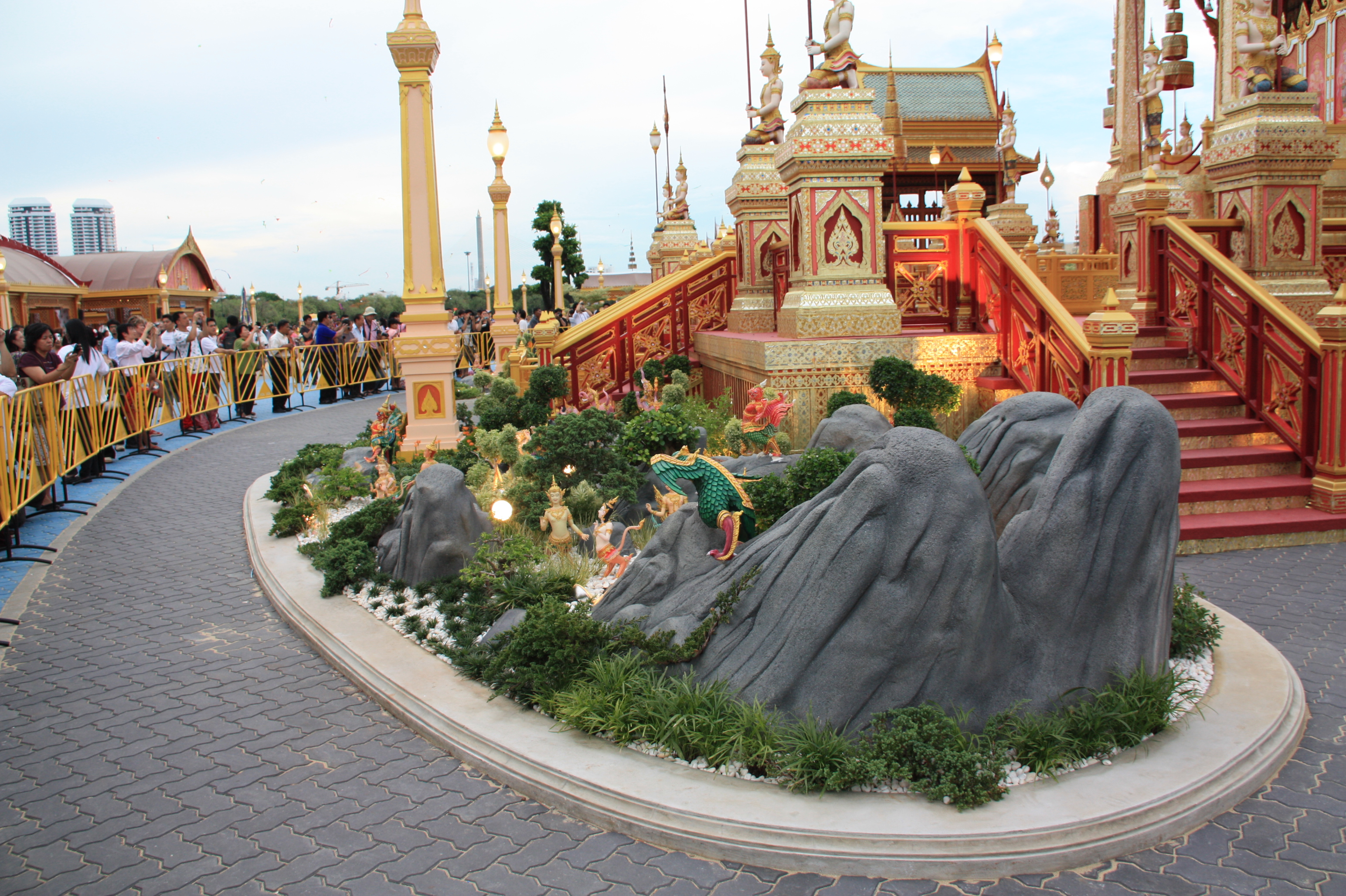
The landscape design around the royal crematorium features the Himmapan Forest, which includes Khao mor and various trees, as well as over 80 sculptures of Himmapan animals

Khao mor or khao mo (Thai: เขามอ, pronounced [kʰǎw.mɔ̄ː]) is a traditional Thai gardening technique that involves shaping trees, shrubs, and rocks into various geometric and architectural forms, including temples, stupas, landscapes, as well as animals and mythical creatures, while imitating the natural scenery of islands, mountains, and surrounding environments.

== History ==
=== Origins ===
Its history dates back to the ancient Ayutthaya Kingdom, as evidenced by archaeological findings at King Narai's Palace in Lopburi, Thailand. Historically, Khao mor has been a popular decorative feature in royal palaces, mansions of notable individuals, important temples, and royal gardens. However, during the reign of King Rama III, the concept of Khao mor was extended beyond the palace walls and made accessible to the general public, resulting in its increased popularity and making it a significant aspect of Thai temples, architectural style, and culture. The term 'Mor', a clipping of Old Khmer 'thma', means rock, and 'Khao' is the Thai word for mountain or hill. Khao mor was influenced by the cultural beliefs and practices of India and China that were brought to Thailand, particularly the notion that tall mountains and deep forests were considered sacred lands where angels and gods reside.

=== Modern ===
Khao mor can be observed in temples such as popular destinations like Wat Pho in Bangkok and Wat Prayurawongsawat in Thonburi. In recognition of its cultural significance and unique contributions to Thai gardening, Khao mor was honored with the Cultural Heritage Conservation Award of Excellence by UNESCO in 2013. Today, Khao mor continues to be an important aspect of Thai gardening and culture, and it is often created in smaller, portable sizes that can be easily displayed or transported.

== See also ==
- List of botanical gardens in Thailand
