= Wat Pho =

Buddhist temple in Phra Nakhon district, Bangkok, Thailand

- วัดโพธิ์
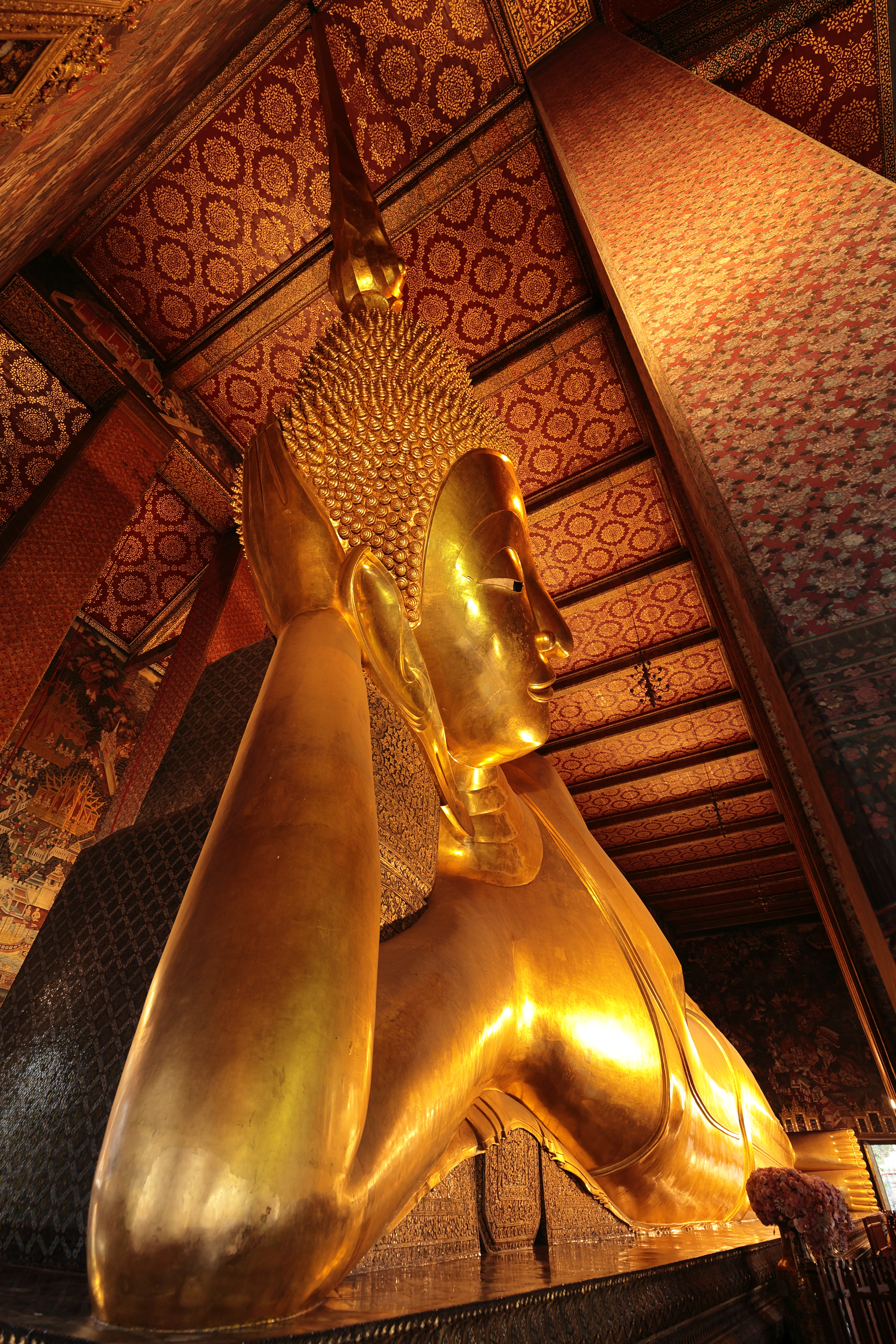
- The Reclining Buddha

- Location in Bangkok

Religion
- Affiliation: Buddhism
- Sect: Theravāda
- Leadership: Somdet Phra Mahathirachan (abbot)

Location
- Country: Thailand
- Coordinates: 13°44′47″N 100°29′37″E

Architecture
- Founder: Unknown; King Rama I (re-establishment)
- Completed: 16th century 1801 (re-establishment)

Website
- www.watpho.com

Wat Pho (Thai: วัดโพธิ์, pronounced [wát pʰōː]), also spelled Wat Po, is a Buddhist temple complex in the Phra Nakhon District, Bangkok, Thailand. It is on Rattanakosin Island, directly south of the Grand Palace. Known also as the Temple of the Reclining Buddha, its official name is Wat Phra Chetuphon Wimon Mangkhalaram Rajwaramahawihan (Thai: วัดพระเชตุพนวิมลมังคลารามราชวรมหาวิหาร; pronounced [wát pʰráʔ tɕʰê:t.tù.pʰon wíʔ.mon.maŋ.kʰlaː.raːm râːt.tɕʰá.wɔː.ráʔ.má.hǎː.wíʔ.hǎːn]). The more commonly known name, Wat Pho, is a contraction of its older name, Wat Photaram (Thai: วัดโพธาราม; RTGS: Wat Photharam).

The temple is first on the list of six temples in Thailand classed as the highest grade of the first-class royal temples. It is associated with King Rama I who rebuilt the temple complex on an earlier temple site. It became his main temple and is where some of his ashes are enshrined. The temple was later expanded and extensively renovated by Rama III. The temple complex houses the largest collection of Buddha images in Thailand, including a 46 m-long (151 ft) huge reclining Buddha. The temple is considered the earliest centre for public education in Thailand, and the illustrations and inscriptions placed in the temple for public instructions has been recognised by UNESCO in its Memory of the World Programme. It houses a school of Thai medicine, and is also known as the birthplace of traditional Thai massage which is still taught and practiced at the temple.

== History ==
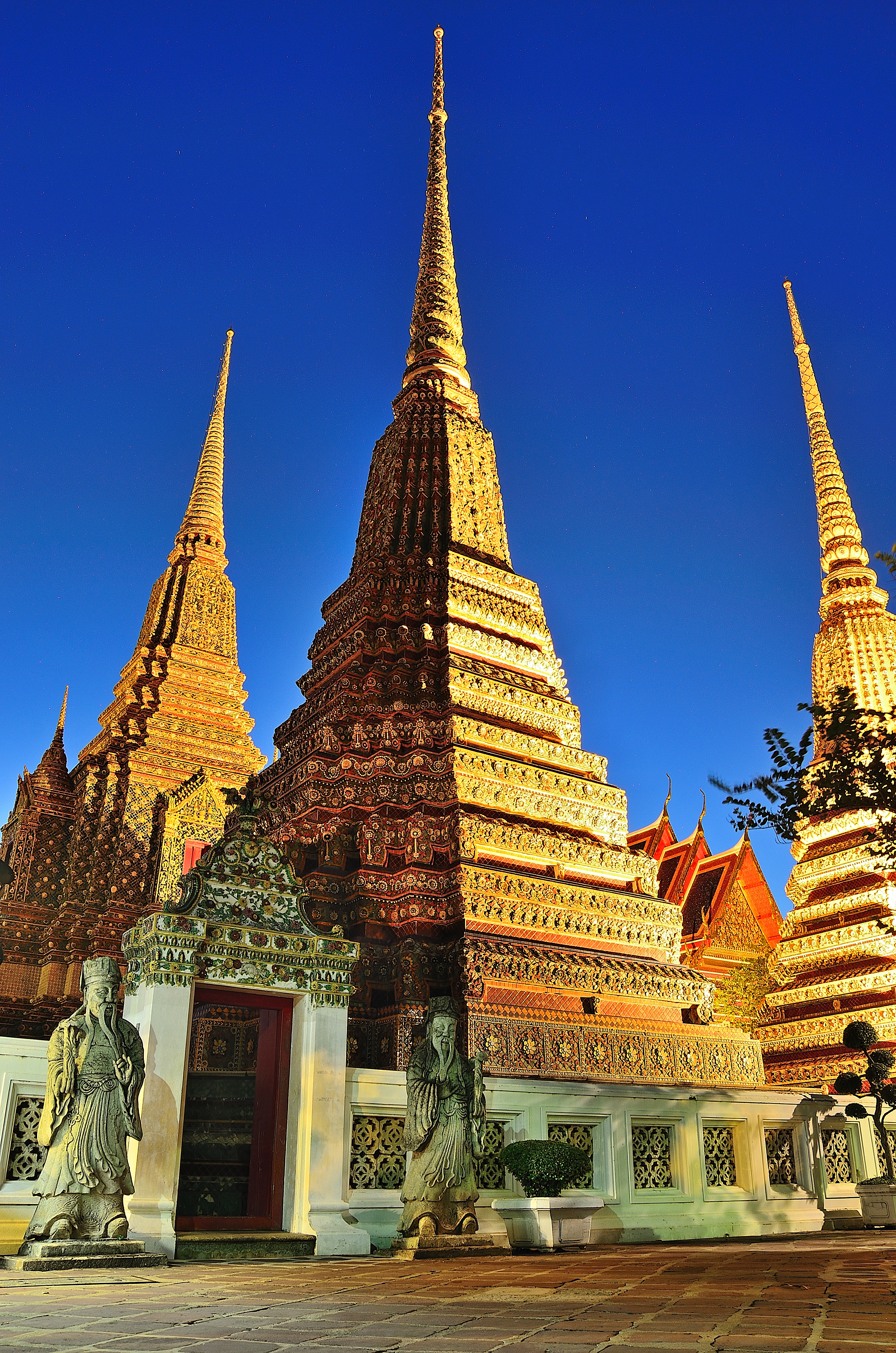
Phra Maha Chedi Si Ratchakan

Wat Pho is one of Bangkok's oldest temples. It existed before Bangkok was established as the capital by King Rama I. It was originally named Wat Photaram or Podharam, from which the name Wat Pho is derived. The name refers to the monastery of the Bodhi tree in Bodh Gaya, India where Buddha is believed to have attained enlightenment. The date of the construction of the old temple and its founder are not known; it was built sometime in the Ayutthaya period, but said to have been built or expanded during the reign of King Phetracha (1688–1703). The southern section of Wat Pho used to be occupied by part of a French Star fort that was demolished by King Phetracha after the 1688 Siege of Bangkok.

After the fall of Ayutthaya in 1767 to the Burmese, King Taksin moved the capital to Thonburi where he located his palace beside Wat Arun on the opposite side of the Chao Phraya River from Wat Pho. The proximity of Wat Pho to this royal palace elevated it to the status of a wat luang ('royal monastery'), to be administered by the royal monastic committee up to the present day.

In 1782, King Rama I moved the capital from Thonburi across the river to Bangkok and built the Grand Palace adjacent to Wat Pho. In 1788, he ordered the construction and renovation at the old temple site of Wat Pho, which had by then become dilapidated. The site, which was marshy and uneven, was drained and filled in before construction began. During its construction, Rama I also initiated a project to remove Buddha images from abandoned temples in Ayutthaya, Sukhothai, and various other sites in Thailand, and many of these retrieved Buddha images were then kept at Wat Pho. These include the remnants of an enormous Buddha image from Ayuthaya's Wat Phra Si Sanphet destroyed by the Burmese in 1767, and these were incorporated into a chedi in the complex. The rebuilding took over seven years to complete. In 1801, twelve years after work began, the new temple complex was renamed Wat Phra Chetuphon Vimolmangklavas in reference to the vihara of Jetavana, and it became the main temple for Rama I.

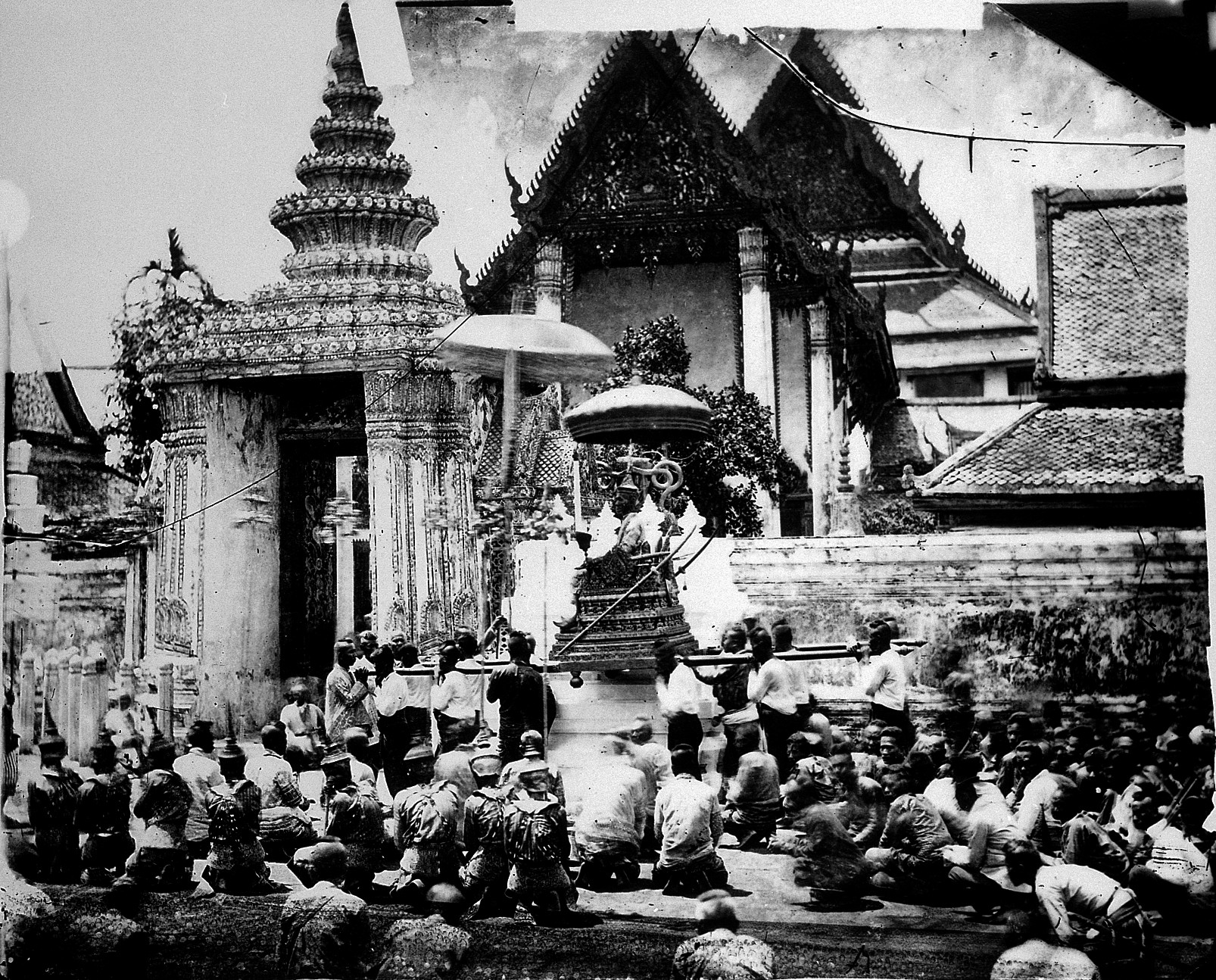
Arrival of King Mongkut at Wat Pho, 13 October 1865

The complex underwent significant changes over the next two centuries, particularly during the reign of Rama III (1824–1851). In 1832, King Rama III began renovating and enlarging the temple complex, a process that took 16 years and seven months to complete. The ground of the temple complex was expanded to 56 rai (9.0 ha; 22 acres), and most of the structures now present in Wat Pho were either built or rebuilt during this period, including the Chapel of the Reclining Buddha. He also turned the temple complex into a public center of learning by decorating the walls of the buildings with diagrams and inscriptions on various subjects. The inscriptions were written by about 50 people from the court of Rama III and learned monks led by Supreme Patriarch Prince Paramanuchitchinorot (1790–1853), the abbot of Wat Pho, a Buddhist scholar, historian and poet. On 21 February 2008, these marble illustrations and inscriptions was registered in the Memory of the World Programme launched by UNESCO to promote, preserve and propagate the wisdom of the world heritage. Wat Pho is regarded as Thailand's first university and a center for traditional Thai massage. It served as a medical teaching center in the mid-19th century before the advent of modern medicine, and the temple remains a center for traditional medicine today where a private school for Thai medicine founded in 1957 still operates.

The name of the complex was changed again to Wat Phra Chetuphon Vimolmangklararm during the reign of King Rama IV. Apart from the construction of a fourth great chedi and minor modifications by Rama IV, there had been no significant changes to Wat Pho since. Repair work, however, is a continuing process, often funded by devotees of the temple. The temple was restored again in 1982 before the Bangkok Bicentennial Celebration.

== Temple complex ==
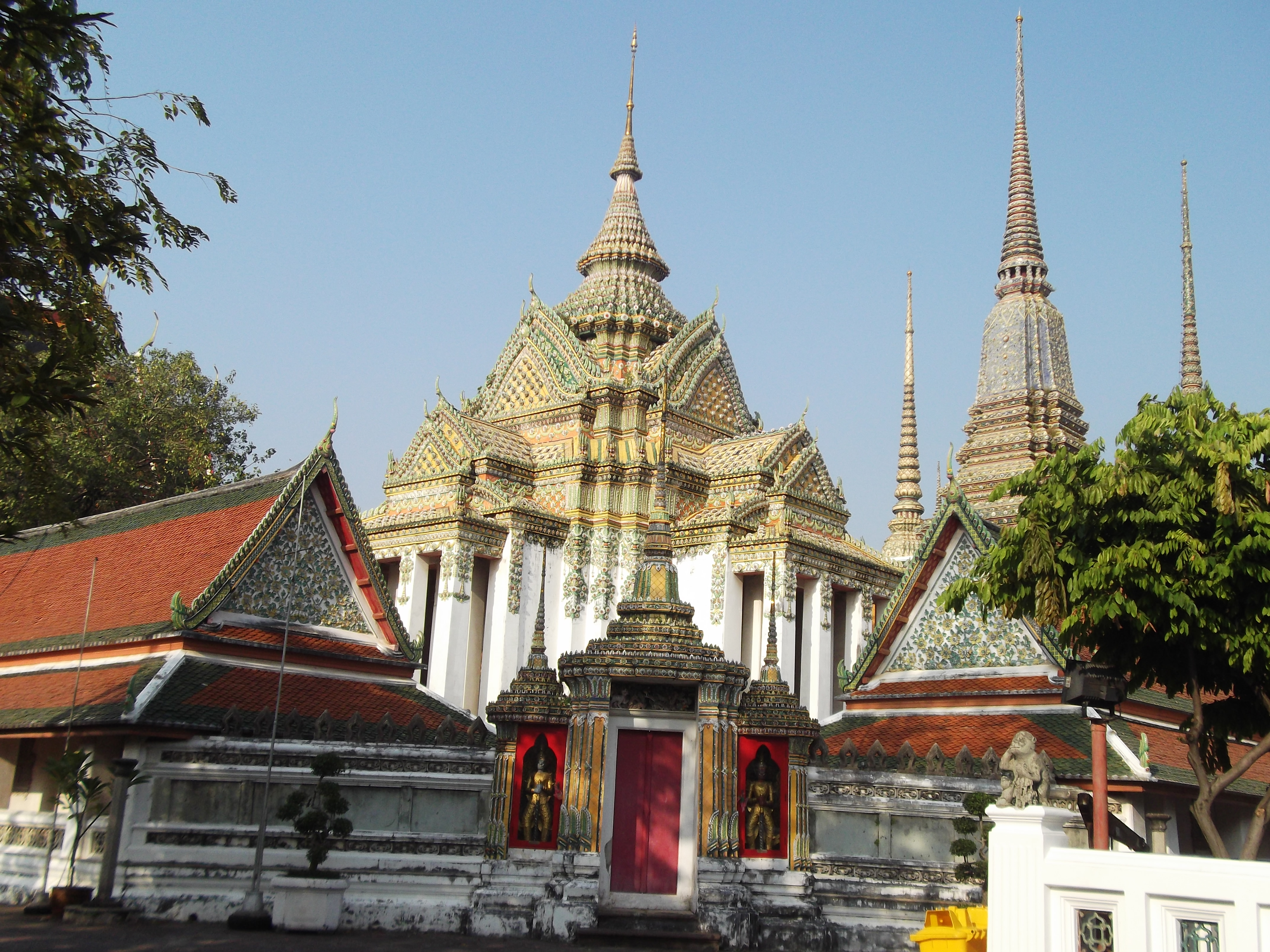
Phra Mondop of Wat Pho. Flanking its entrances are statues of Yak Wat Pho

Wat Pho is one of the largest and oldest wats in Bangkok covering an area of 50 rai or 80,000 square metres. It is home to more than one thousand Buddha images, as well as one of the largest single Buddha images at 46 metres (151 ft) in length. The Wat Pho complex consists of two walled compounds bisected by Chetuphon Road running in the east–west direction. The larger northern walled compound, the phutthawat, is open to visitors and contains the finest buildings dedicated to the Buddha, including the bot with its four directional viharn, and the temple housing the reclining Buddha. The southern compound, the sankhawat, contains the residential quarters of the monks and a school. The perimeter wall of the main temple complex has sixteen gates, two of which serve as entrances for the public (one on Chetuphon Road, the other near the northwest corner).

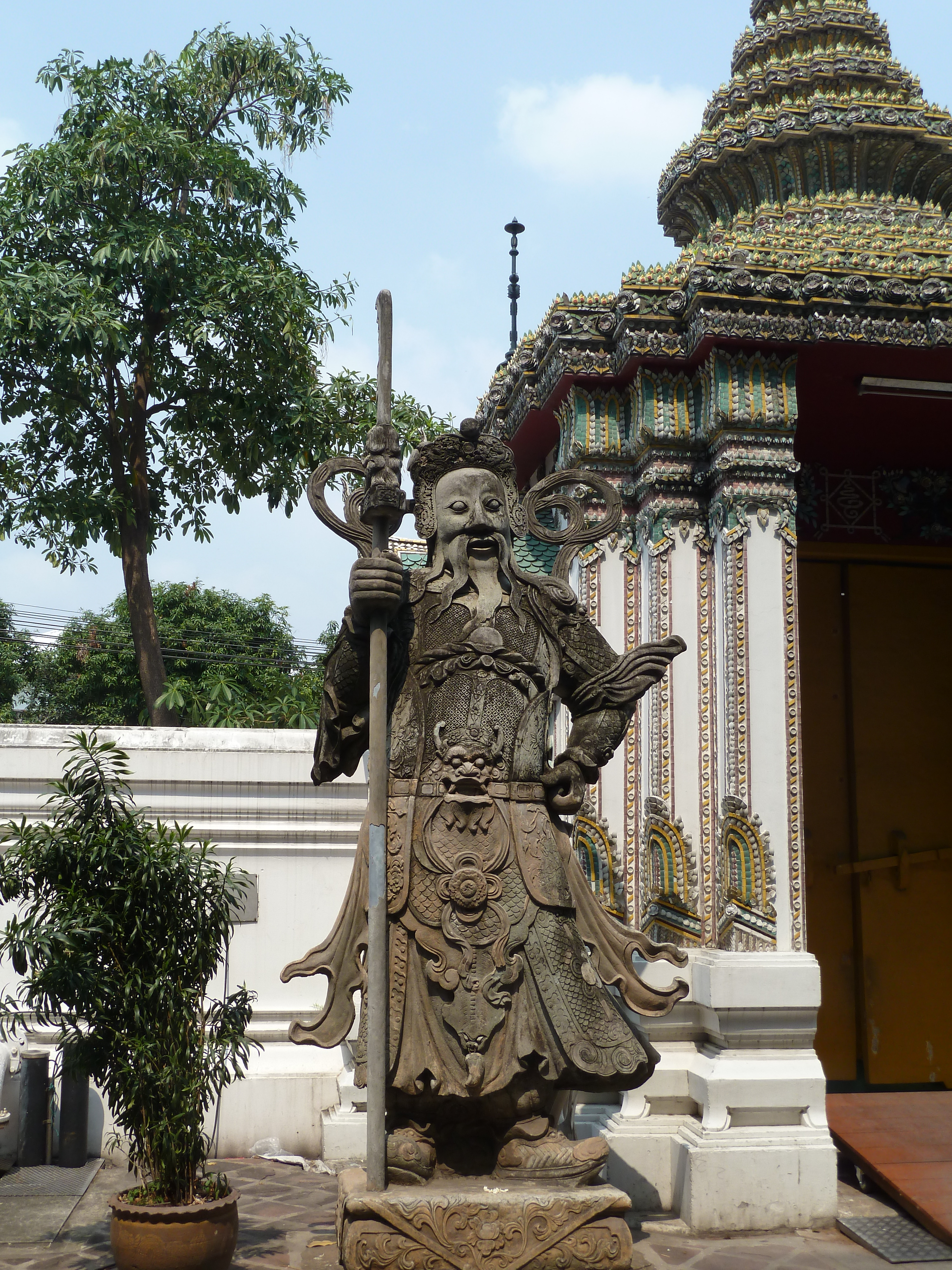
Chinese guardian figure beside a gate, Wat Pho

The temple grounds contain four great chedis, 91 small chedis, two belfries, a bot (central shrine), a number of viharas (halls) and various buildings such as pavilions, as well as gardens and a small temple museum. Architecturally the chedis and buildings in the complex are different in style and sizes. A number of large Chinese statues, some of which depict Europeans, are also found in the complex guarding the gates of the perimeter walls as well as other gates in the compound. These stone statues were originally imported as ballast on ships trading with China.

Wat Pho was also intended to serve as a place of education for the general public. To this end a pictorial encyclopedia was engraved on granite slabs covering eight subject areas: history, medicine, health, custom, literature, proverbs, lexicography, and the Buddhist religion. These plaques, inscribed with texts and illustrations on medicine, figures with pressure points for Thai traditional massage, and other subjects, are placed around the temple, for example, within the Sala Rai or satellite open pavilions. Dotted around the complex are 24 small rock gardens (khao mor) illustrating rock formations of Thailand, and one, called the Contorting Hermit Hill, contains some statues showing methods of massage and yoga positions. There are also drawings of constellations on the wall of the library, inscriptions on local administration, as well as paintings of folk tales and animal husbandry.

=== Phra Ubosot ===
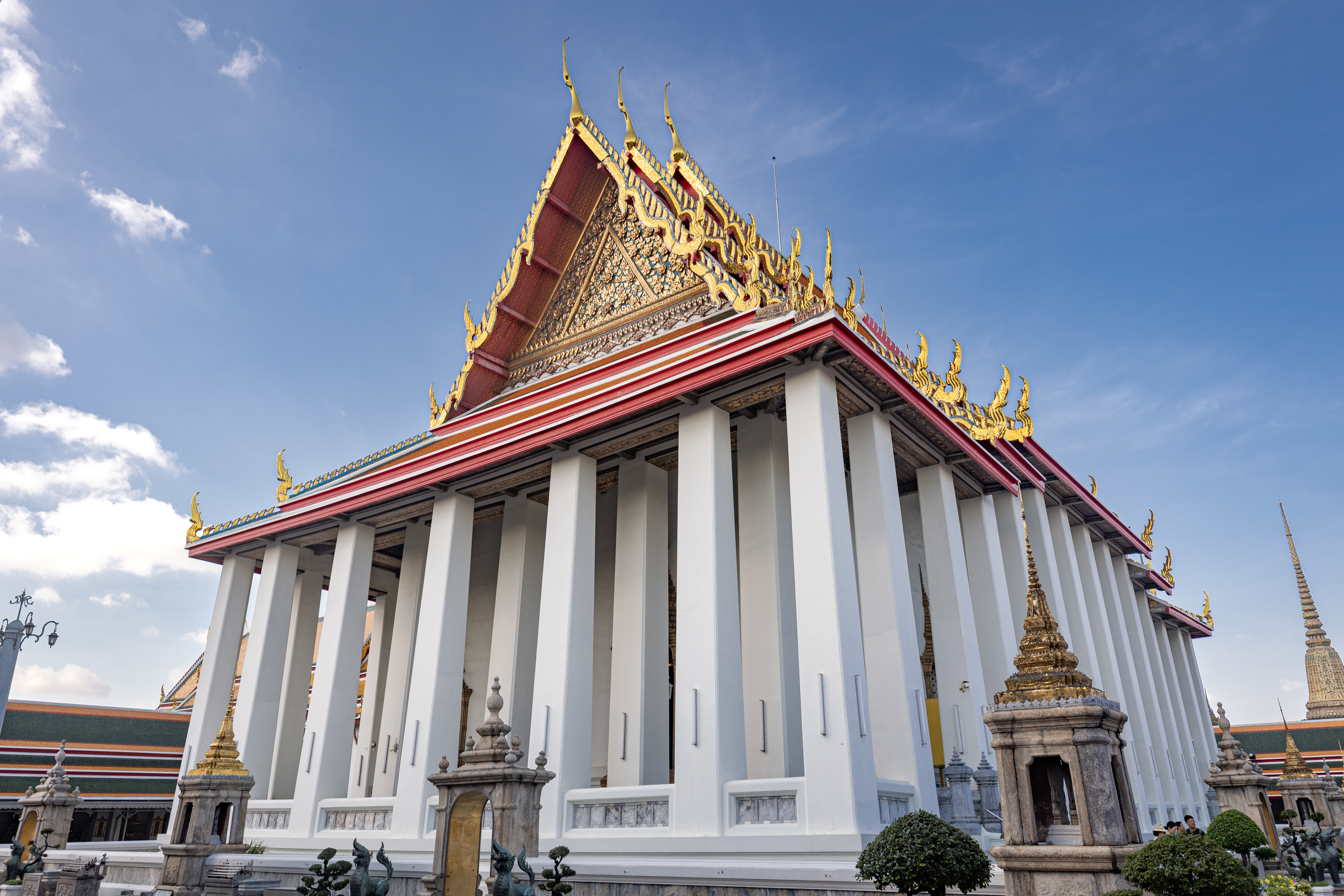
Phra Ubosot

Phra Ubosot (Phra Uposatha) or bot is the ordination hall, the main hall used for performing Buddhist rituals, and the most sacred building of the complex. It was constructed by King Rama I in the Ayuthaya-style, and later enlarged and reconstructed in the Rattanakosin-style by Rama III. The bot was dedicated in 1791, before the rebuilding of Wat Pho was completed. This building is raised on a marble platform, its teak doors are inset with mother-of-pearl illustrating stories from the Ramayana. The ubosot lies in the center of courtyard enclosed by a double cloister (Phra Rabiang).

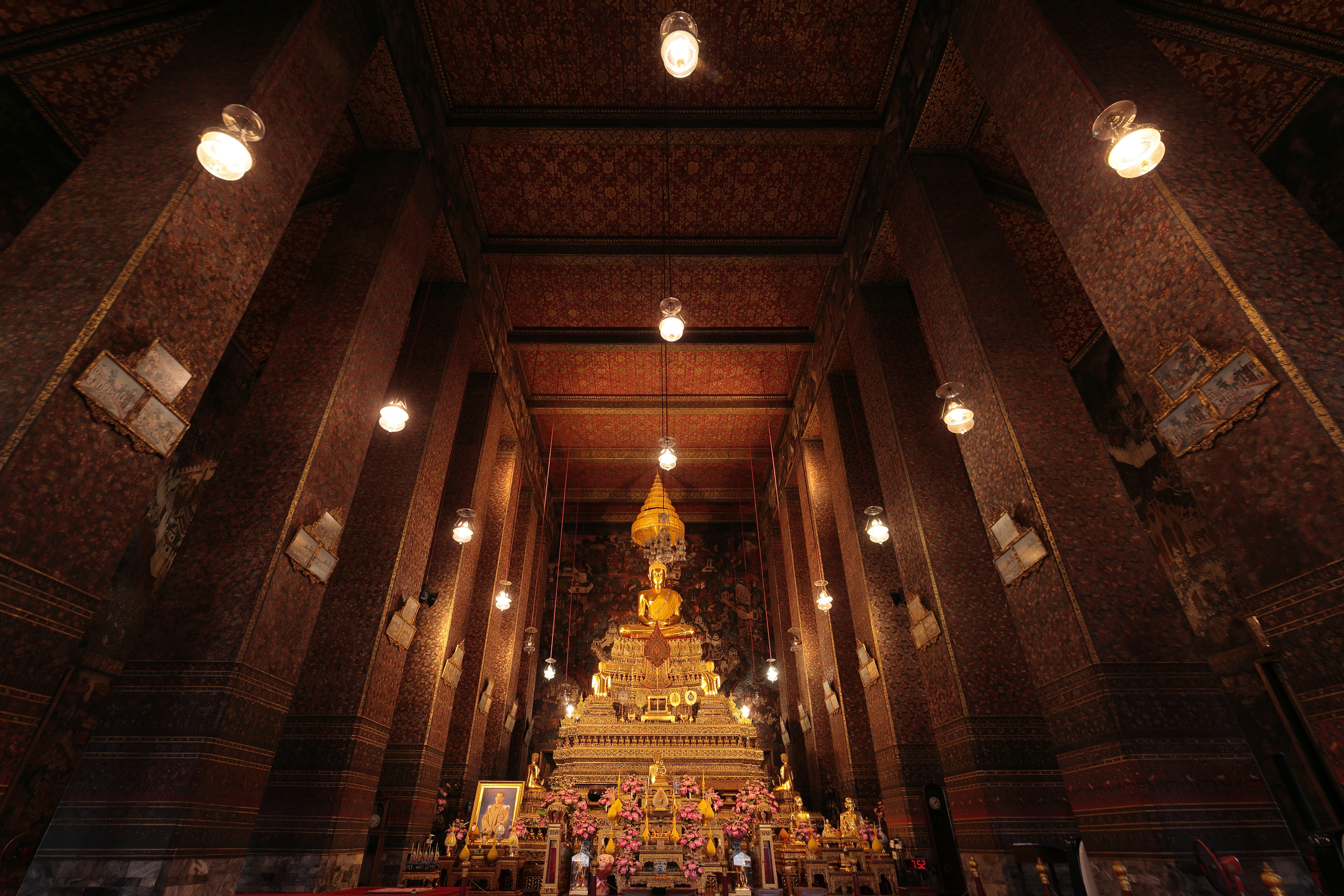
Interior of the ubosot of Wat Pho

Inside the ubosot is a gold and crystal three-tiered pedestal topped with a gilded Buddha made of a gold-copper alloy, and over the statue is a nine-tiered umbrella representing the authority of Thailand. The Buddha image, known as Phra Buddha Theva Patimakorn and thought to be from the Ayutthaya period, was moved here by Rama I from Wat Sala Si Na (now called Wat Khuhasawan) in Thonburi. Rama IV later placed some ashes of Rama I under the pedestal of the Buddha image so that the public may pay homage to both Rama I and the Buddha at the same time. There are also ten images of Buddha's disciples in the hall: Moggalana is to the left of Buddha and Sariputta to the right, with eight Arahants below.

The exterior balustrade surrounding the main hall has around 150 depictions in stone of the epic, Ramakien, the ultimate message of which is transcendence from secular to spiritual dimensions. The stone panels were recovered from a temple in Ayuthaya. The ubosot is enclosed by a low wall called kamphaeng kaew, which is punctuated by gateways guarded by mythological lions, as well as eight structures that house bai sema, stone markers that delineate the sacred space of the bot.

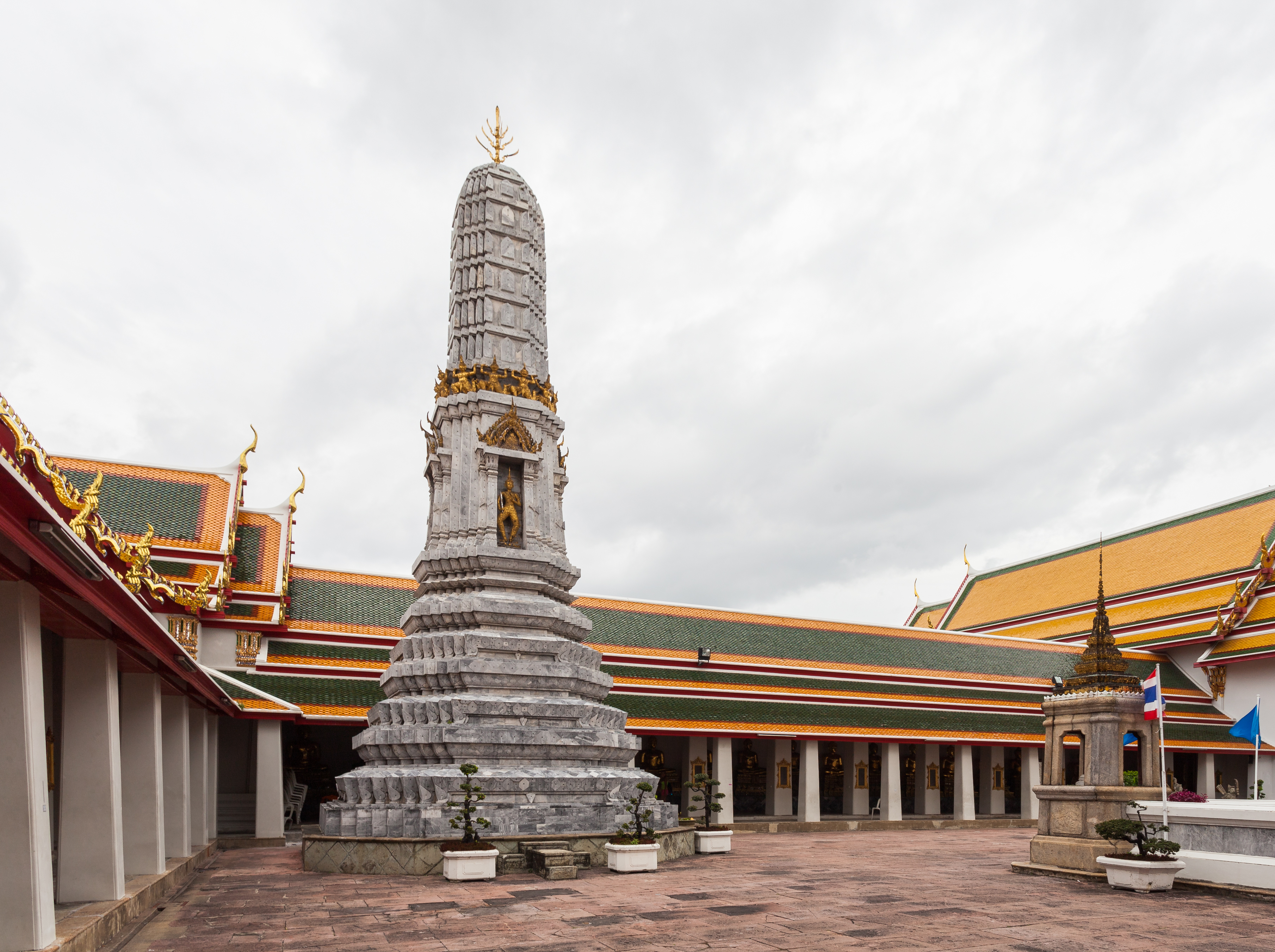
Phra Prang and part of the Phra Rabiang cloister

- Phra Rabiang – This double cloister contains around 400 images of Buddha from northern Thailand selected out of the 1,200 originally brought by King Rama I. Of these Buddha images, 150 are on the inner side of the double cloister, another 244 images are on the outer side. These Buddha figures, some standing and some seated, are evenly mounted on matching gilded pedestals. These images are from different periods in Siamese history, such as the Chiangsaen, Sukhothai, U-Thong, and Ayutthaya eras, but they were renovated by Rama I and covered with stucco and gold leaves to make them look similar.

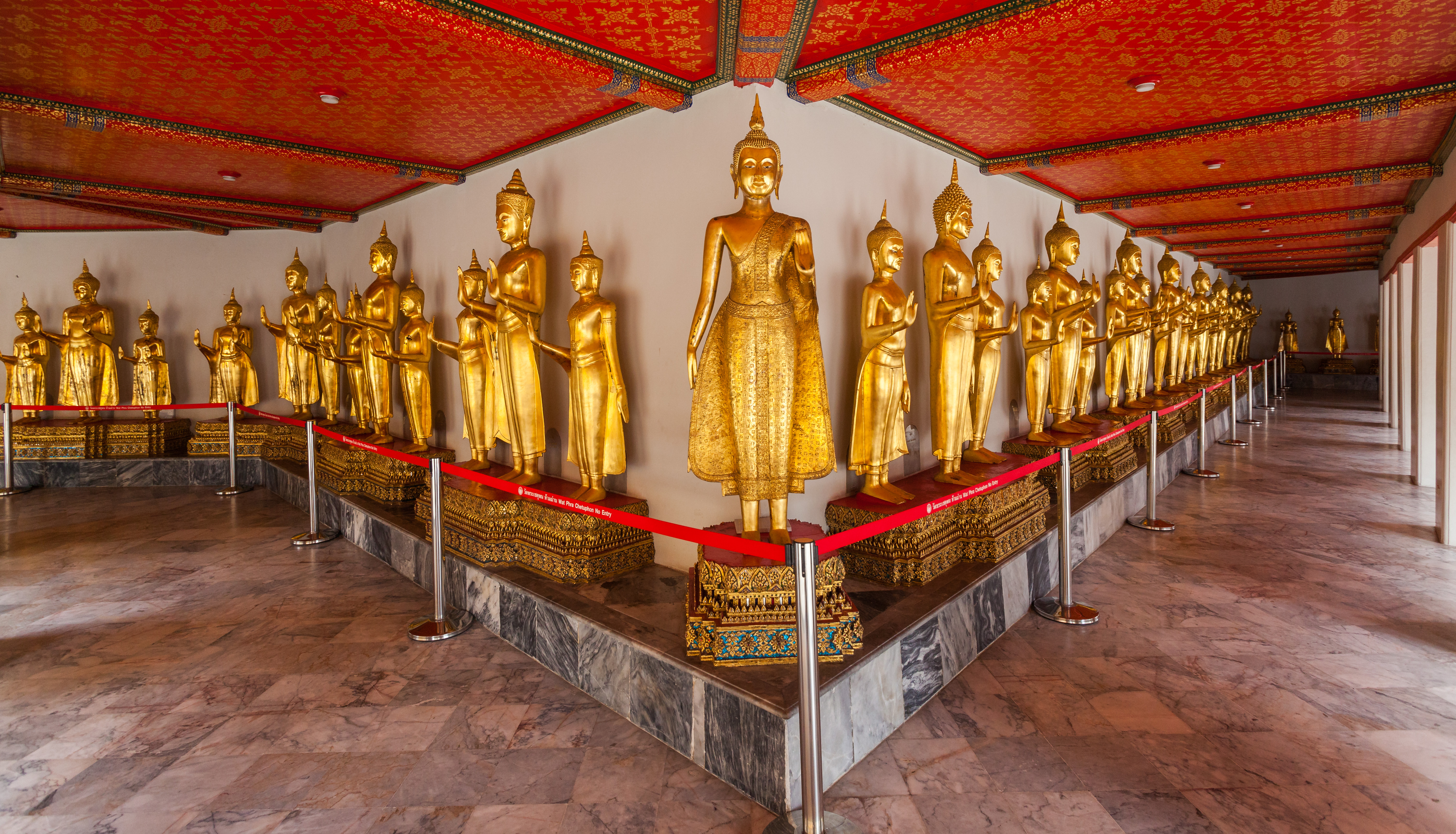
Buddha images in the cloister. The cloister is intersected with four viharas or viharns, one on each direction.

The Phra Rabiang is intersected by four viharns. The viharn in the east contains an 8-metre-tall (26 ft) standing Buddha, the Buddha Lokanatha ("Saviour of the World"), originally from Ayutthaya. In its antechamber is Buddha Maravichai (referencing victory over Mara), sitting under a bodhi tree, originally from Sawankhalok of the late-Sukhothai period. The one on the west has a seated Buddha sheltered by a naga, the Buddha Chinnasri ("the victorious lion Buddha"), while the Buddha on the south, the Buddha Chinnaraja (named after Phra Phuttha Chinnarat of Phitsanulok), has five disciples seated in front listening to his first sermon. Both Buddhas in the south and west viharns were brought from Sukhothai by Rama I. The Buddha in the north viharn, called Buddha Palilai (a reference to the elephant Palilaika), was cast in the reign of Rama I. The viharn on the west contains a small museum.

- Phra Prang – There are four towers, or phra prang, at each corner of the courtyard around the bot. Each of the towers is tiled with marble and contains four Khmer-style statues which are the guardian divinities of the Four Cardinal Points.

=== Phra Maha Chedi Si Rajakarn ===
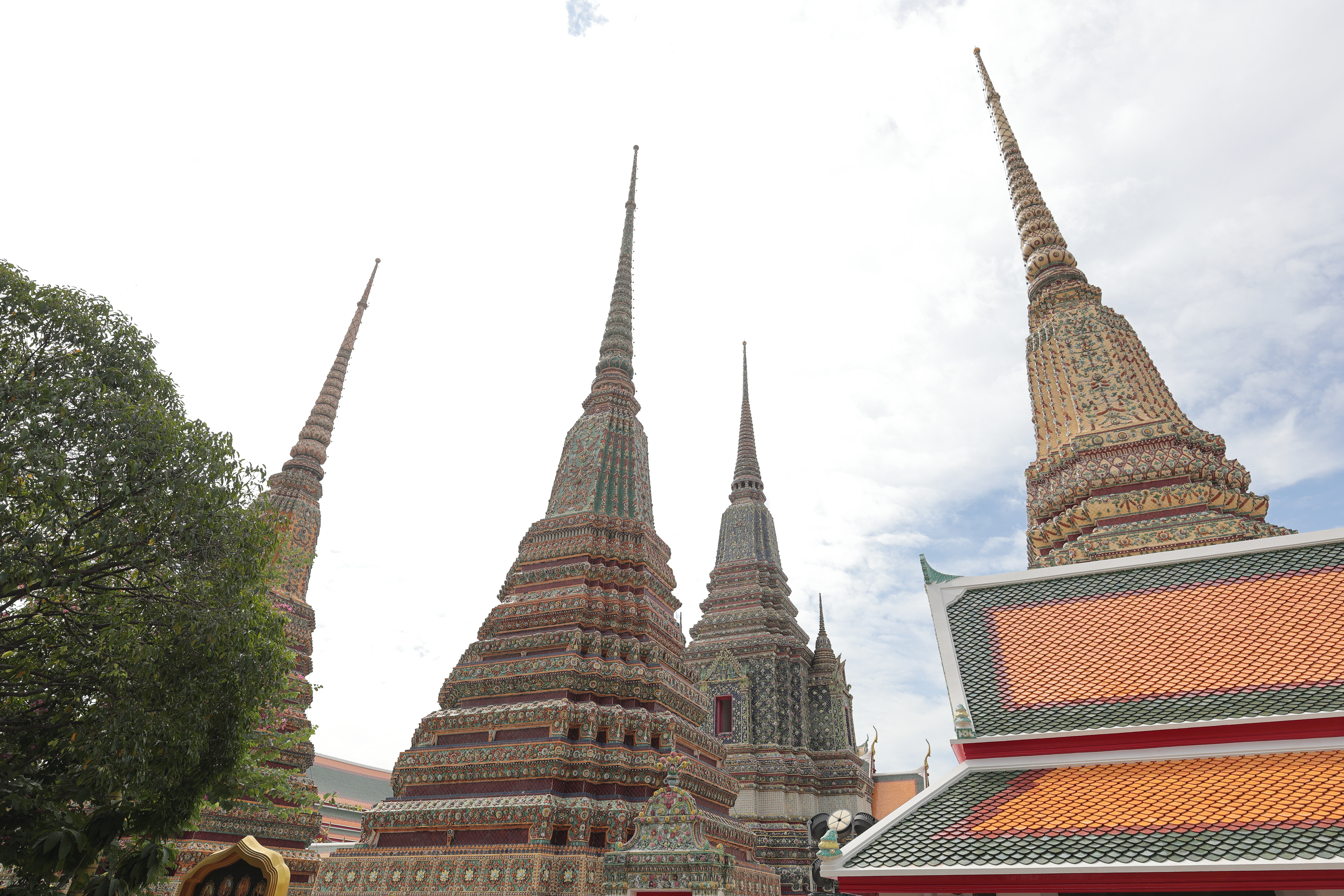
Phra Maha Chedi Si Rajakarn

This is a group of four large stupas, each 42 metres high. These four chedis are dedicated to the first four Chakri kings. The first, in green mosaic tiles, was constructed by Rama I to house the remnants of a great bronze standing Buddha from Ayutthaya called Phra Phuttha Sanphet. The Burmese were said to have scorched the Buddha image to remove near 2 tons of its gold covering, later the image fragmented when the vihan it was in collapsed upon it, and Rama I who brought it Wat Pho decided to encase the image in the chedi.

Two more chedis were built by Rama III, one in white tiles to hold the ashes of his father Rama II, another in yellow for himself. A fourth in blue was built by Rama IV who then enclosed the four chedis leaving no space for more to be built.

=== Viharn Phranorn ===
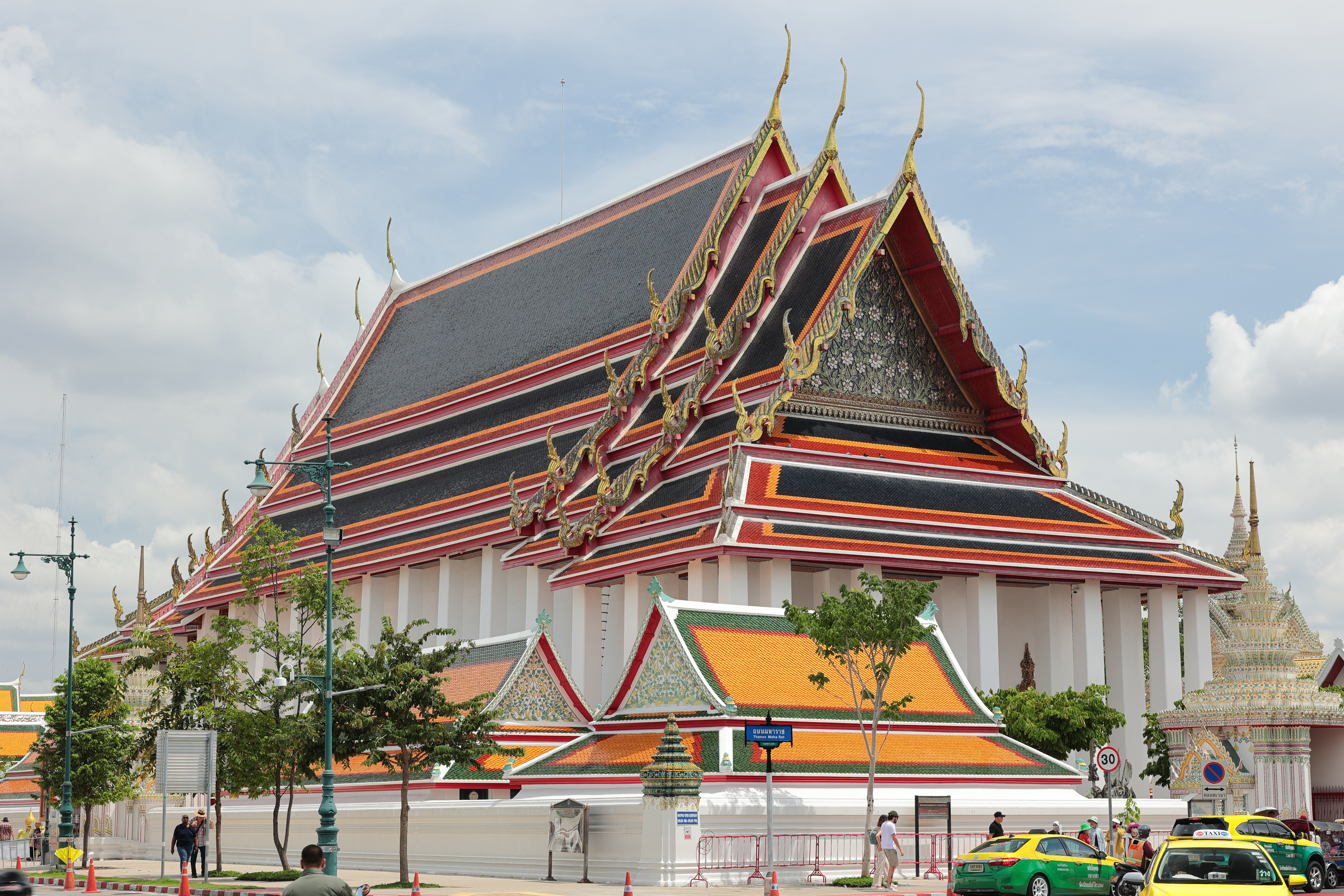
Viharn Phranorn

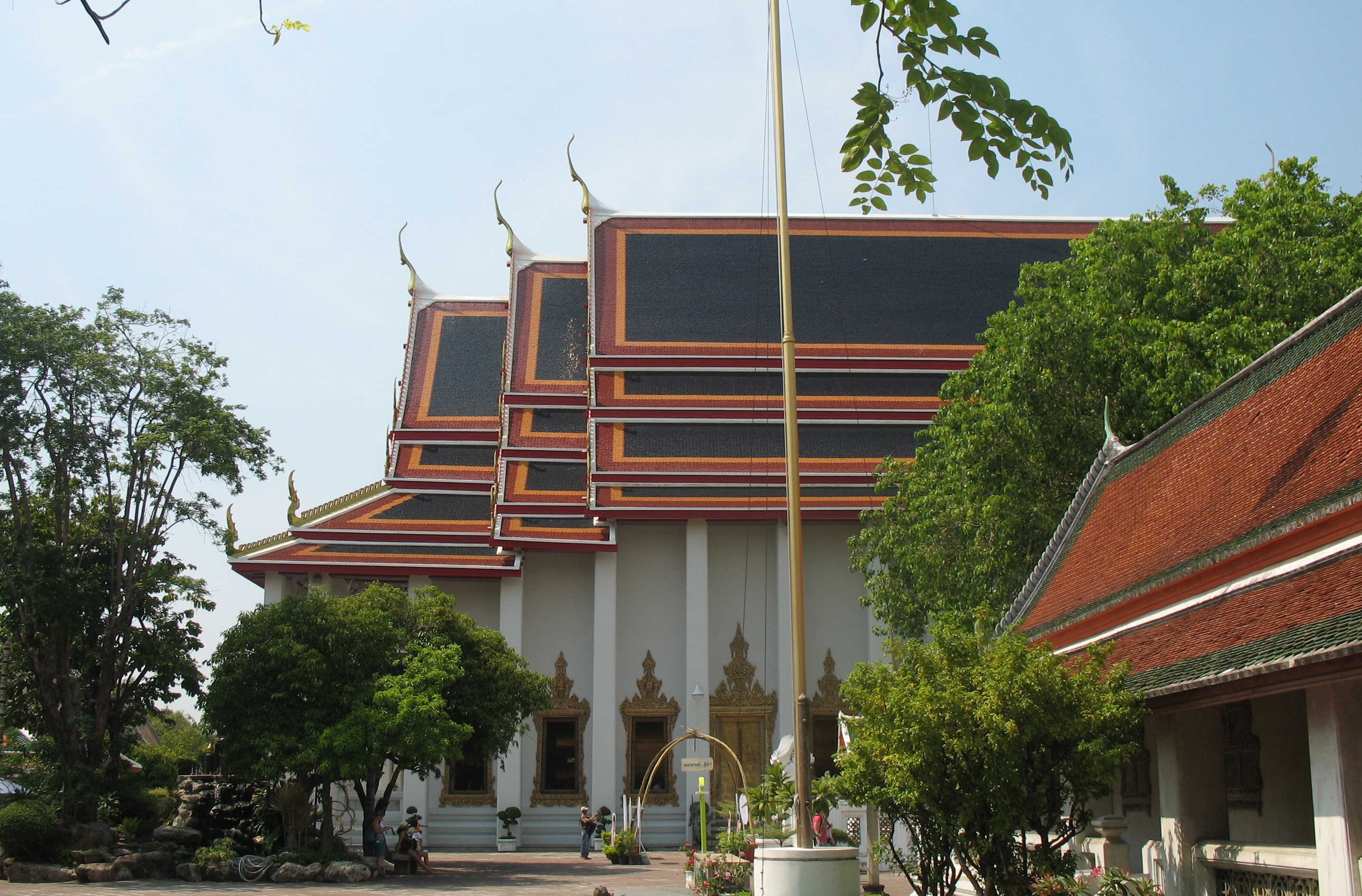
The Viharn containing the reclining Buddha. The tree on the right behind a pavilion is the Bodhi tree.

The viharn or wihan contains the reclining Buddha and was constructed in the reign of Rama III emulating the Ayutthaya style. The interior is decorated with panels of mural.

Adjacent to this building is a small raised garden (Missakawan Park) with a Chinese-style pavilion; the centre piece of the garden is a bodhi tree which was propagated from the Jaya Sri Maha Bodhi tree in Sri Lanka that is believed to have originally came from a tree in India where Buddha sat while awaiting enlightenment.

=== Phra Mondop ===
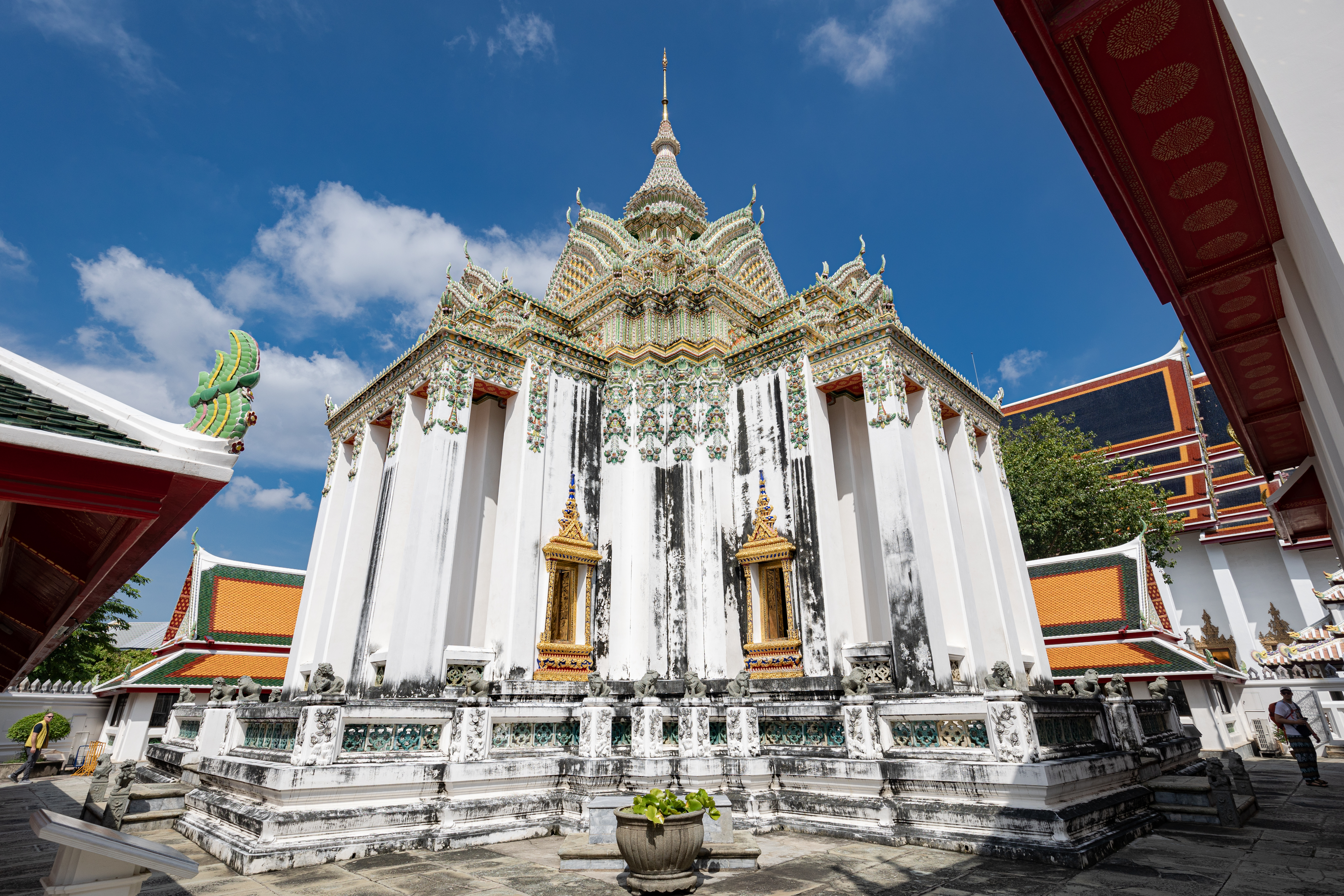
Phra Mondop

Phra Mondop or the ho trai is the Scripture Hall containing a small library of Buddhist scriptures. The building is not generally open to the public as the scriptures, which are inscribed on palm leaves, need to be kept in a controlled environment for preservation. The library was built by King Rama III. Guarding its entrance are figures called Yak Wat Pho ('Wat Pho's Giants') placed in niches beside the gates. Around Phra Mondop are three pavilions with mural paintings of the beginning of Ramayana.

=== Other structures ===
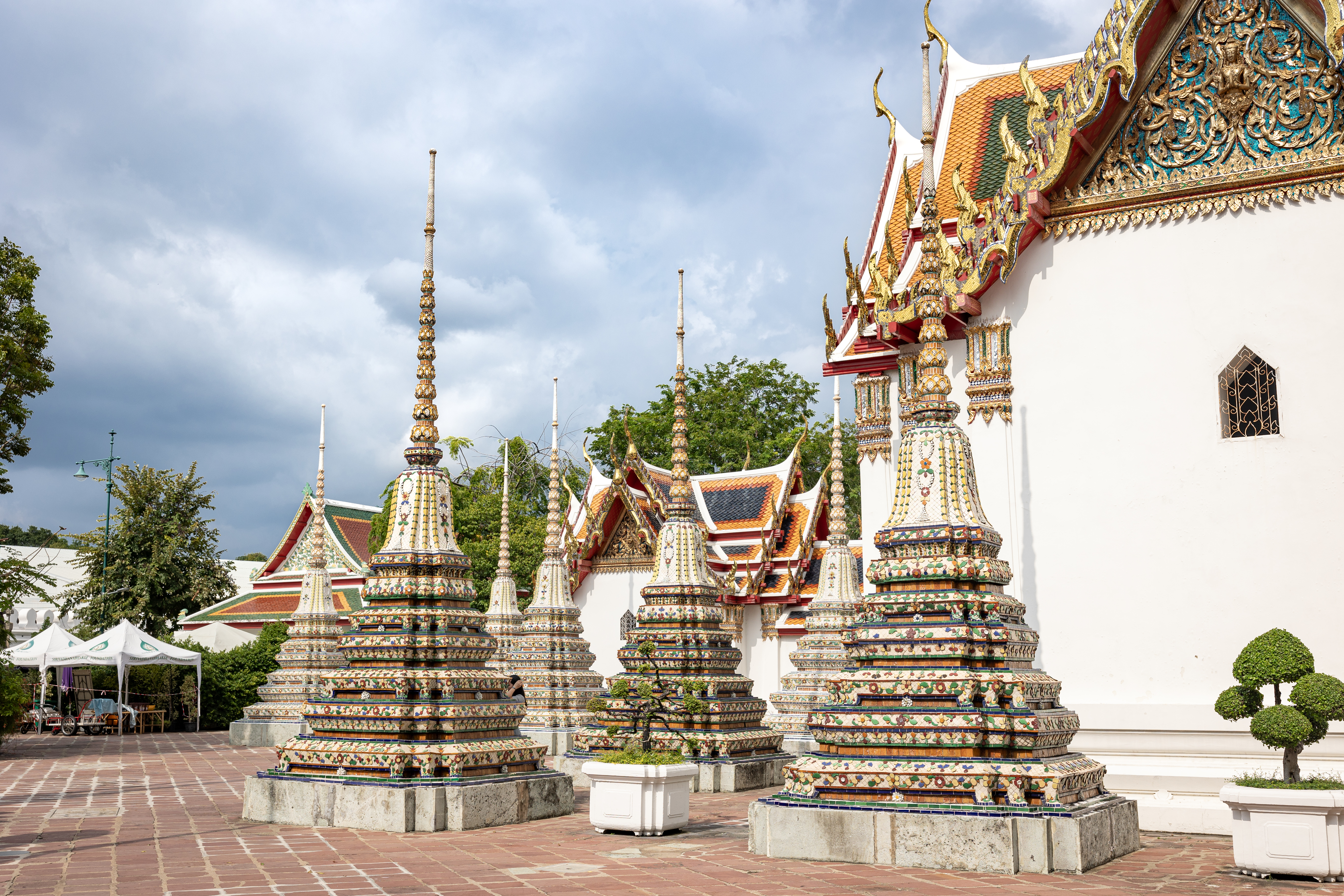
Phra Chedi Rai which contains the ashes of members of the royal family

- Phra Chedi Rai – Outside the Phra Rabiang cloisters are dotted many smaller chedis, called Phra Chedi Rai. Seventy-one of these small chedis were built by Rama III, each five metres in height. There are also four groups of five chedis that shared a single base built by Rama I, one on each corner outside the cloister. The 71 chedis of smaller size contain the ashes of the royal family, and 20 slightly larger ones clustered in groups of five contain the relics of Buddha.

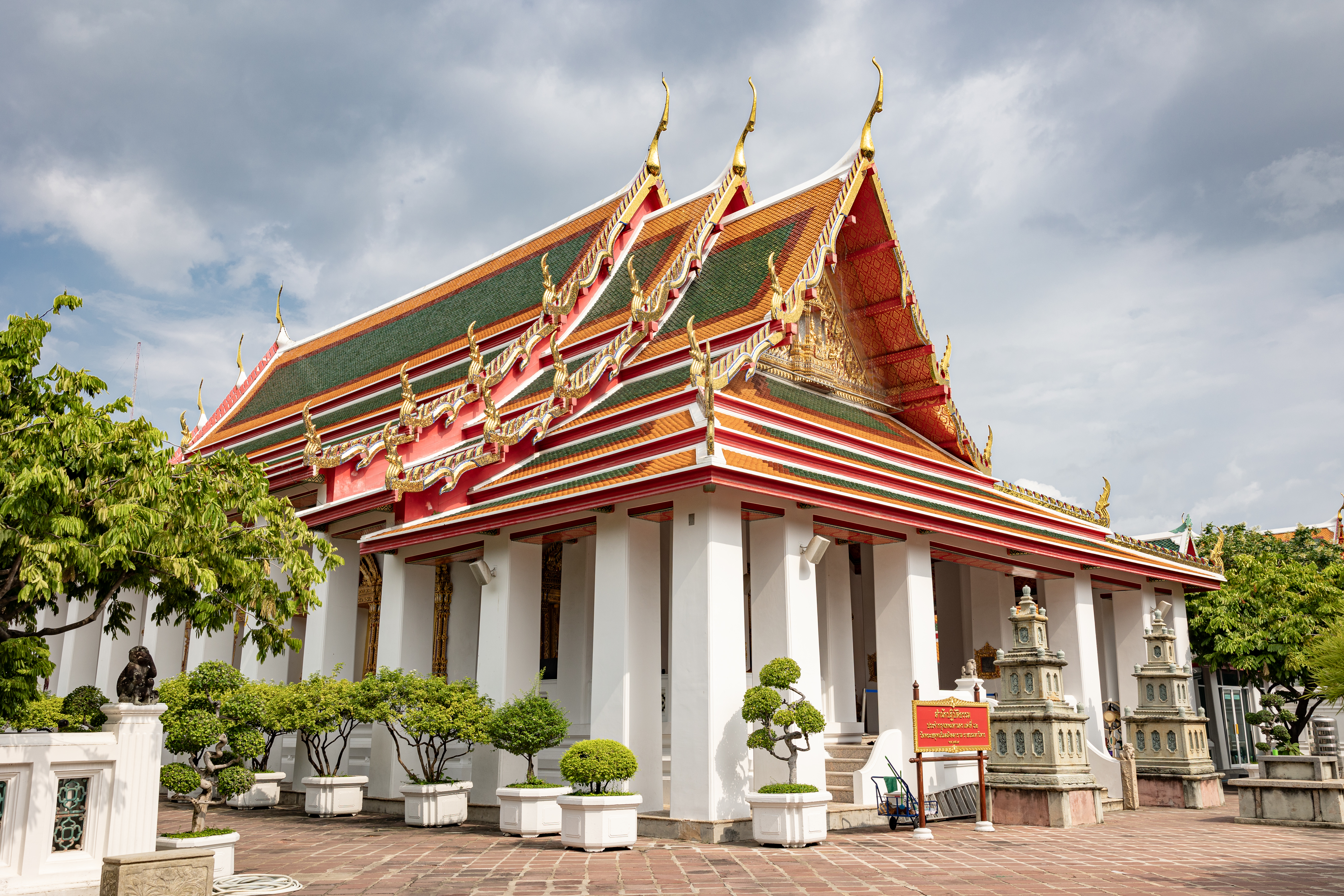
Sala Karn Parien

- Sala Karn Parien – Sala Karn Parien is the preaching hall, a simple pavilion used for religious instruction for monks and laymen, and also serves as a meditation hall. This hall is next to the Phra Mondop at the southwest corner of the compound, and is thought to date from the Ayutthaya period. The building contains the original Buddha image from the bot, which was moved here to make way for the Buddha image currently in the bot. The Buddha image, called Phra Phuttha Satsada, is in the late Ayutthaya style. Next to it is a garden called The Crocodile Pond.
- Sala Rai – There are 16 satellite pavilions, most of them placed around the edge of the compound, and murals depicting the life of Buddha may be found in some of these. Two of these are the medical pavilions between Phra Maha Chedi Si Ratchakarn and the main chapel. The north medicine pavilion contains Thai traditional massage inscriptions with 32 drawings of massage positions on the walls while the one to the south has a collection of inscriptions on guardian angel that protects the newborn.
- Phra Viharn Kod – This is the gallery which consists of four viharas, one on each corner outside the Phra Rabiang.
- Tamnak Wasukri – Also called the poet's house, this is the former residence of Prince Patriarch Paramanuchitchinorot, a scholar, historian and poet. The house was a gift from his nephew Rama III. This building is in the living quarters of the monks in the southern compound and is open once a year on his birthday.

== Reclining Buddha ==
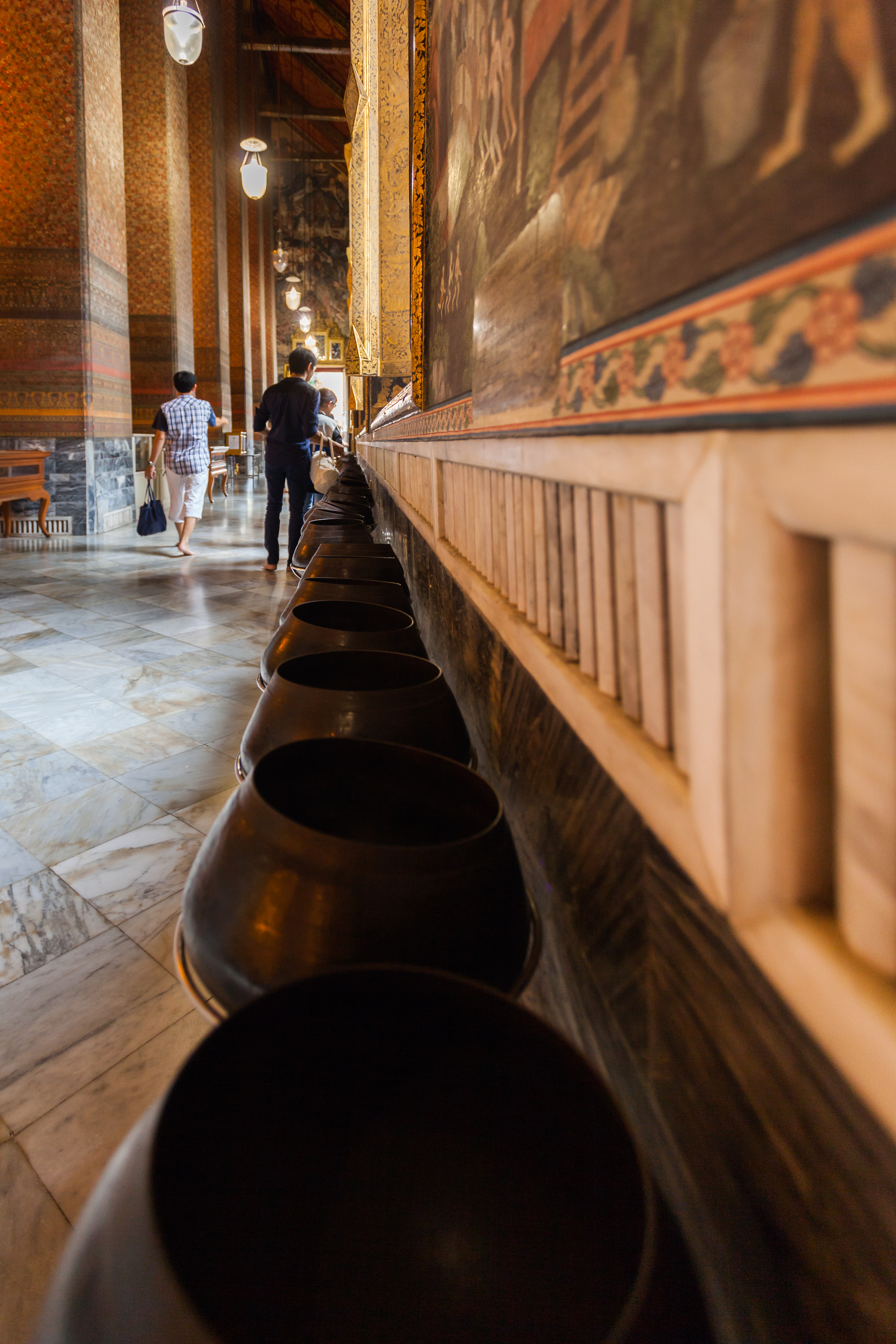
108 bronze bowls

The wat and the reclining Buddha (Phra Buddhasaiyas, Thai: พระพุทธไสยาสน์) were built by Rama III in 1832. The image of the reclining Buddha represents the entry of Buddha into Nirvana and the end of all reincarnations. The posture of the image is referred to as sihasaiyas, the posture of a sleeping or reclining lion. The figure is 15 m high and 46 m long, and it is one of the largest Buddha statues in Thailand.

The figure has a brick core, which was modelled and shaped with plaster, then gilded. The right arm of the Buddha supports the head with tight curls, which rests on two box-pillows encrusted with glass mosaics. The soles of the feet of the Buddha are 3 m high and 4.5 m long, and inlaid with mother-of-pearl. They are each divided into 108 arranged panels, displaying the auspicious symbols by which Buddha can be identified, such as flowers, dancers, white elephants, tigers, and altar accessories. At the center of each foot is a circle representing a chakra or 'energy point'. There are 108 bronze bowls in the corridor representing the 108 auspicious characters of Buddha. Visitors may drop coins in these bowls as it is believed to bring good fortune, and it also helps the monks to maintain the wat.

Although the reclining Buddha is not a pilgrimage destination, it remains an object of popular piety. An annual celebration for the reclining Buddha is held around the time of the Siamese Songkran or New Year in April, which also helps raise funds for the upkeep of Wat Pho.

Reclining Buddha (Phra Buddhasaiyas)

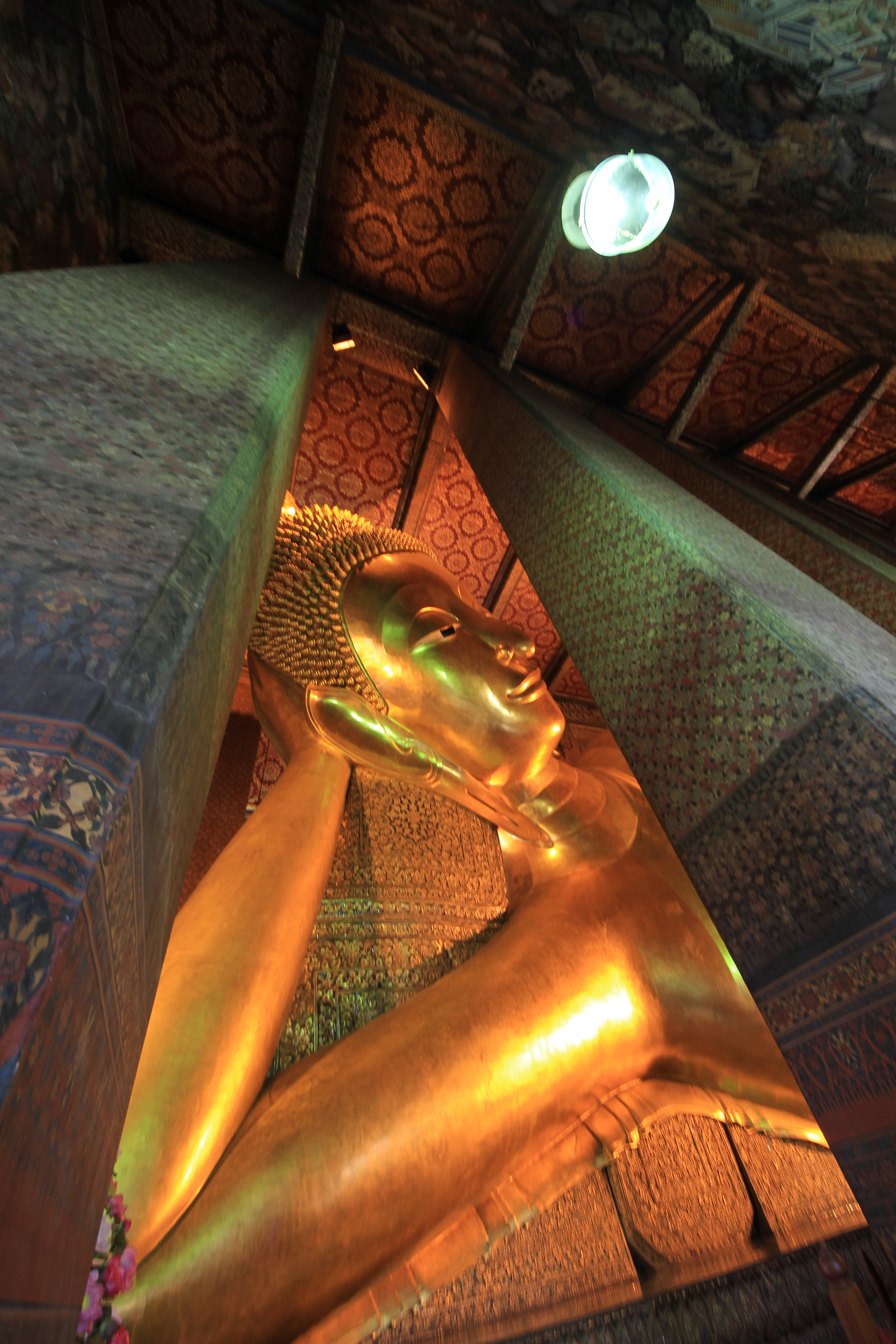

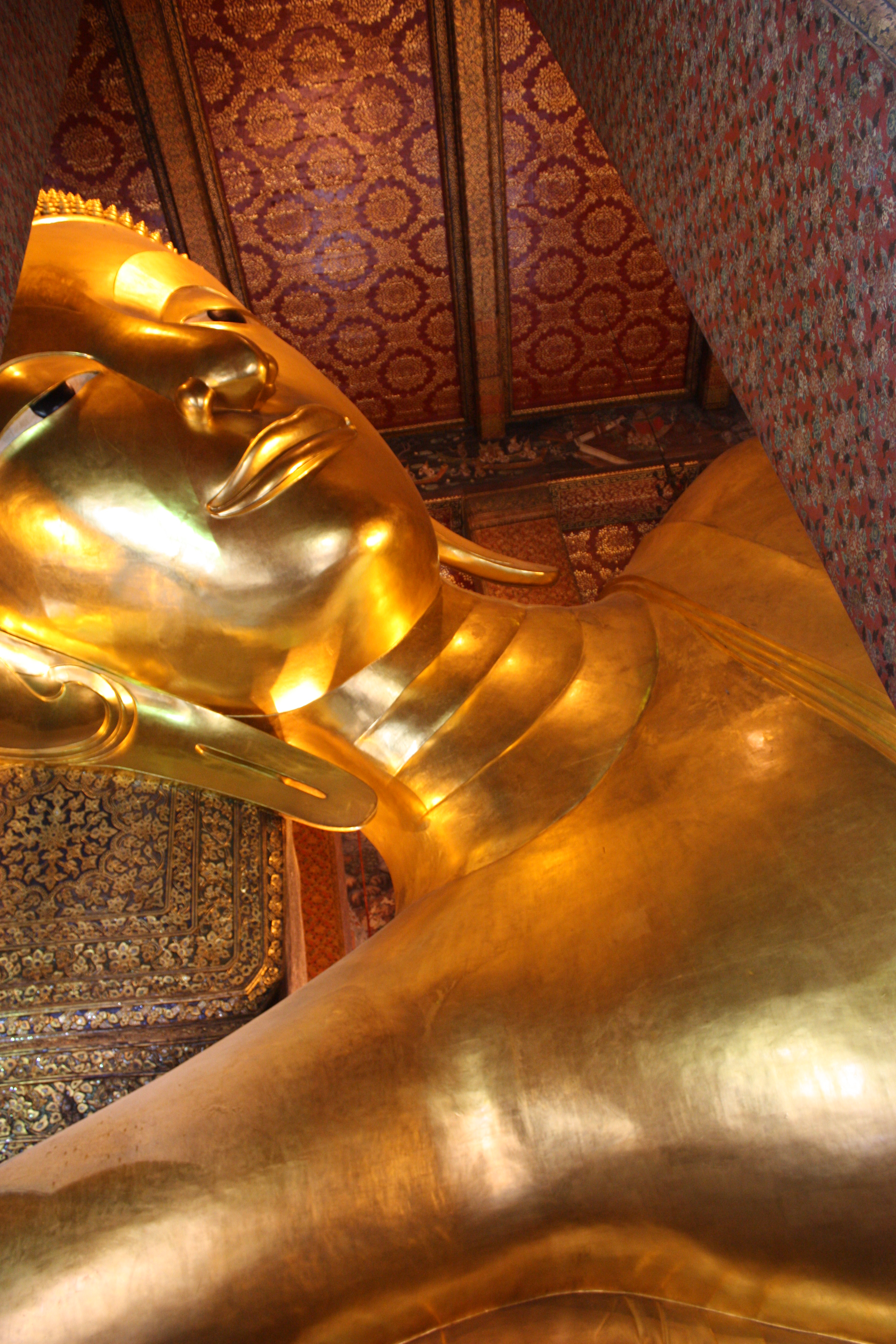

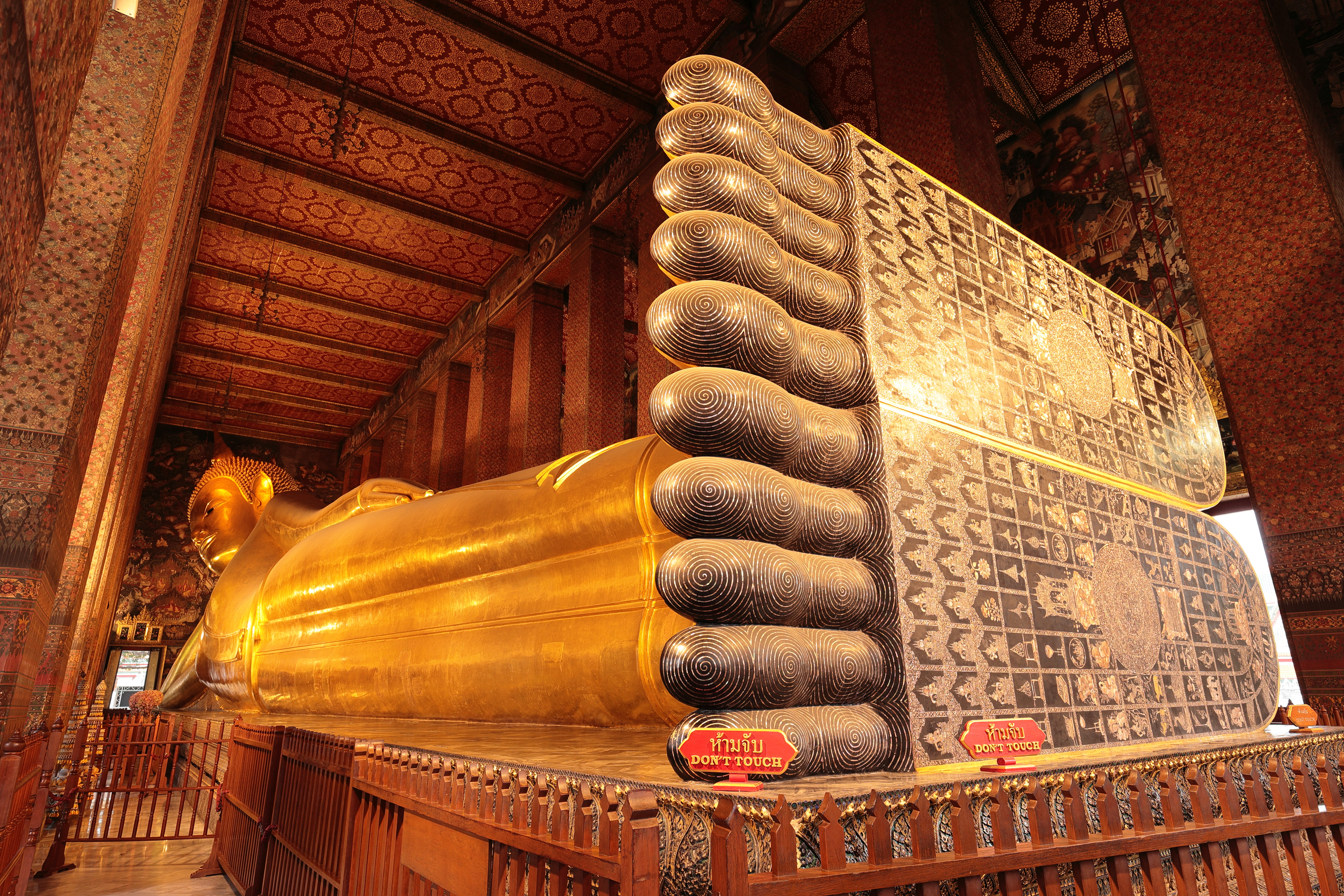

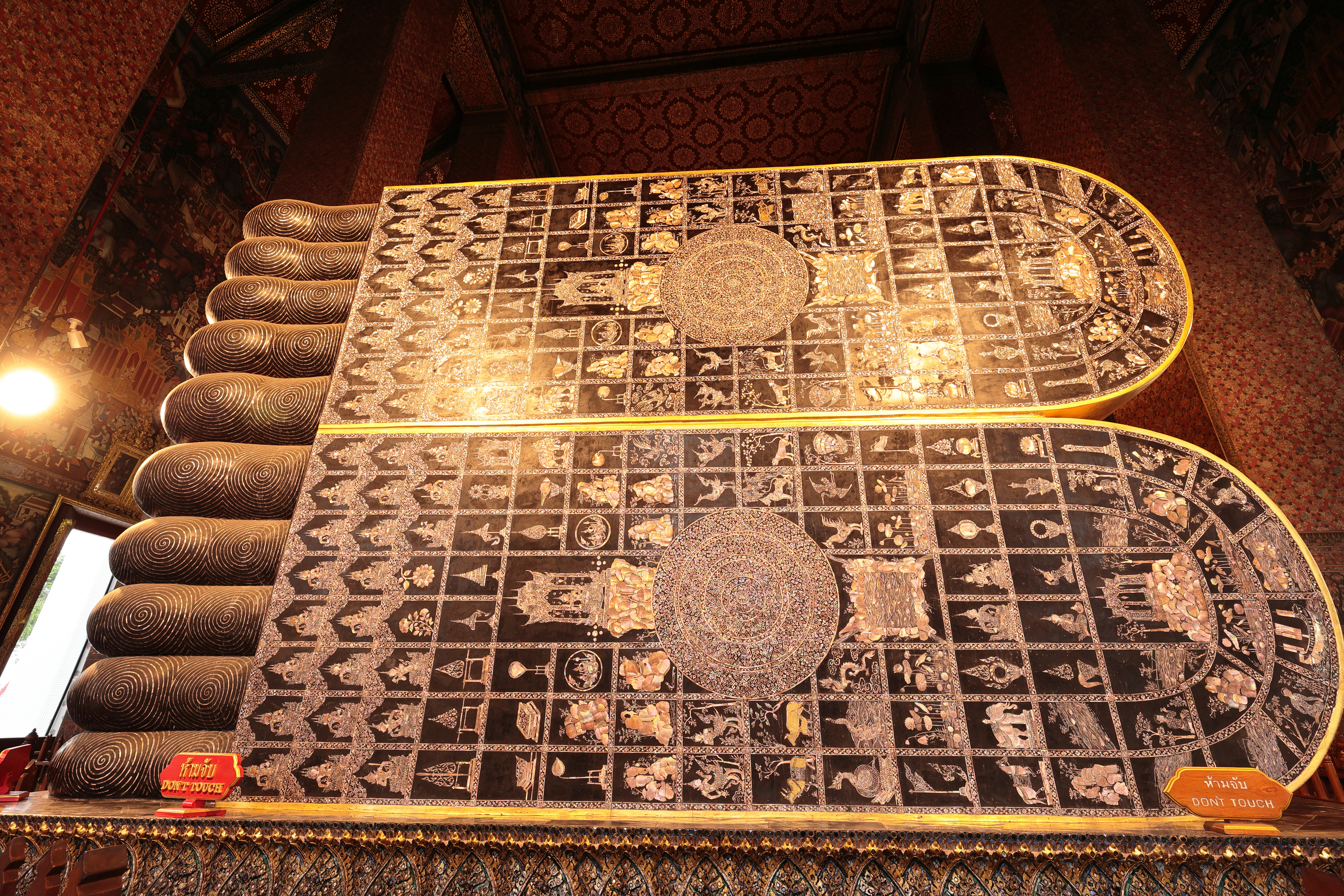

== Thai massage ==
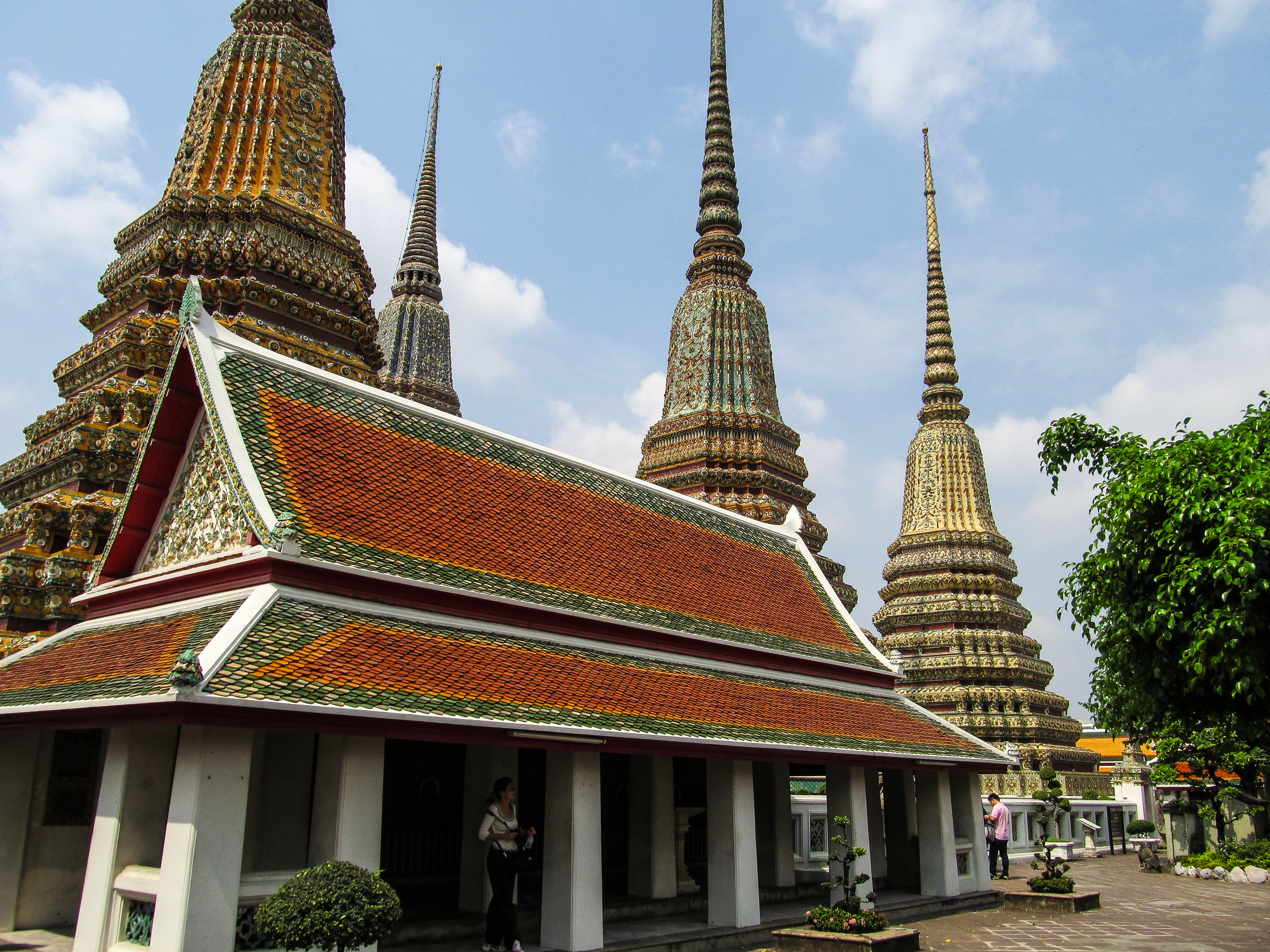
Medicine pavilion

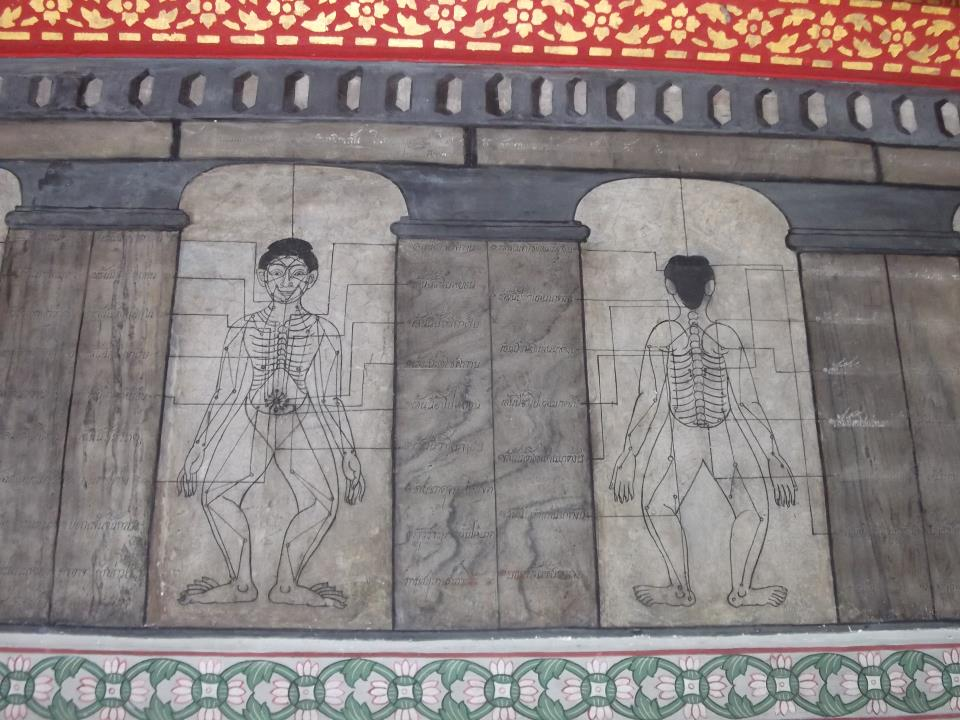
Illustrations in the medicine pavilion

The temple is considered the first public university of Thailand, teaching students in the fields of religion, science, and literature through murals and sculptures. A school for traditional medicine and massage was established at the temple in 1955, and now offers four courses in Thai medicine: Thai pharmacy, Thai medical practice, Thai midwifery, and Thai massage. This, the Wat Pho Thai Traditional Medical and Massage School, is the first school of Thai medicine approved by the Thai Ministry of Education, and one of the earliest massage schools. It remains the national headquarters and the center of education of traditional Thai medicine and massage to this day. Courses on Thai massage are held in Wat Pho, and these may last a few weeks to a year. Two pavilions at the eastern edge of the Wat Pho compound are used as classrooms for practising Thai traditional massage and herbal massage, and visitors can receive massage treatment here for a fee. The Thai massage or Nuad Thai taught at Wat Pho has been included in UNESCO's list of Intangible Cultural Heritage, and Wat Pho has trained more than 200,000 massage therapists who practice in 145 countries.

There are many medical inscriptions and illustrations placed in various buildings around the temple complex, some of which serve as instructions for Thai massage therapists, particularly those in the north medical pavilion. They were inscribed by scholars during the reign of King Rama III. Among these are 60 inscribed plaques, 30 each for the front and back of human body, showing pressure points used in traditional Thai massage. These therapeutic points and energy pathways, known as sen, with explanations given on the walls next to the plaques.

== Site plan ==
The sangkhawat (monks' quarters) of Wat Pho located to the south is not shown in this plan.

Plan of the northern enclosure of Wat Pho

1. Phra Ubosot
2. Kamphaeng kaew
3. East Viharn
4. South Viharn
5. West Viharn
6. North Viharn
7. Phra Prang
8. 5 Chedis with a single base
9. Phra Chedi Rai
10. Phra Rabiang
11. Phra Viharn Kod
12. Khao Mor (rock gardens)
13. Phra Maha Chedi Si Rajakarn
14. Phra Mondop
15. Pavilions
16. Viharn Phranorn (Chapel of the Reclining Buddha)
17. Sala Karn Parien
18. Missakawan Park
19. The Crocodile Pond
20. Belfry
21. Gates
22. Massage service
23. Sala Rai

== Gallery ==
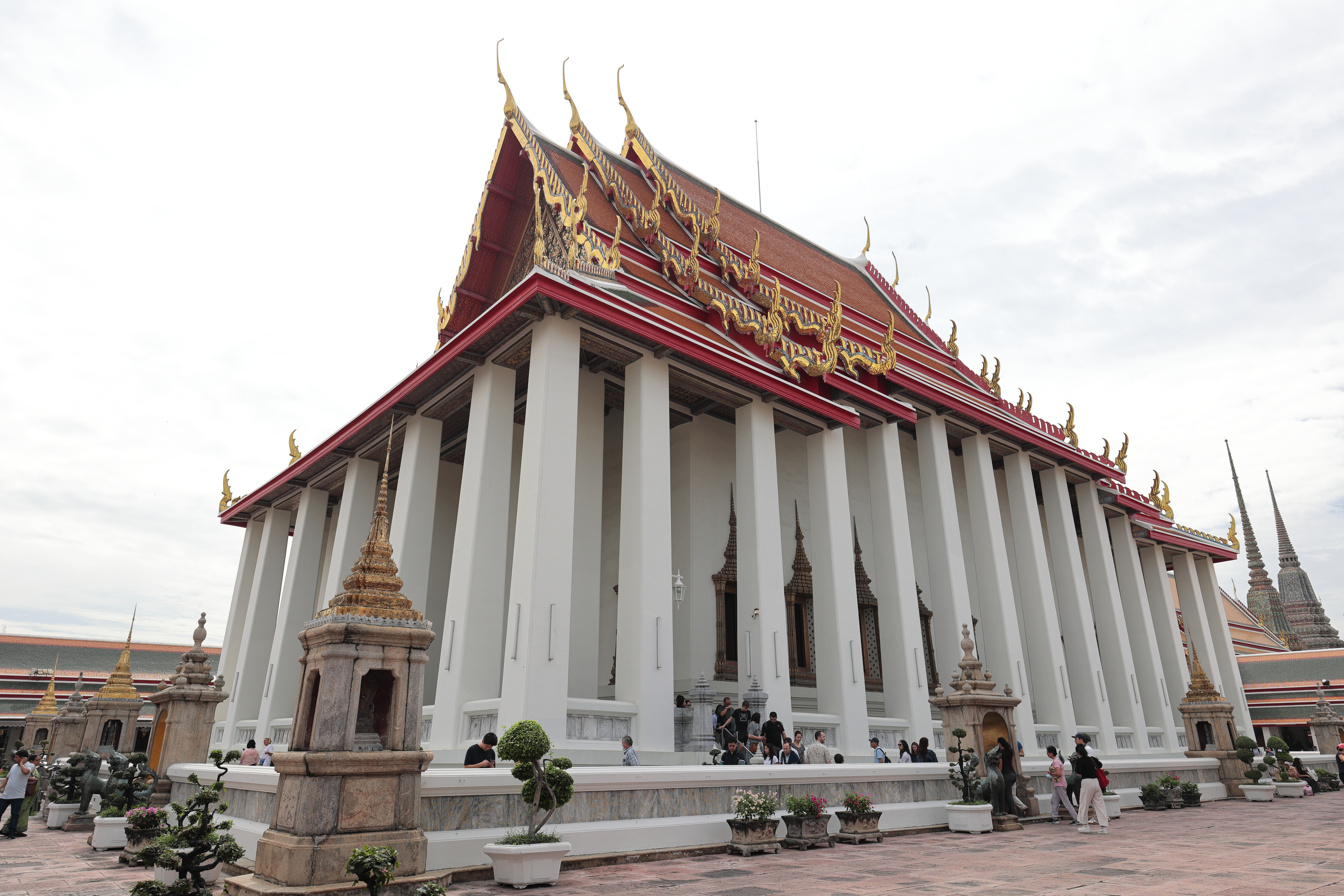

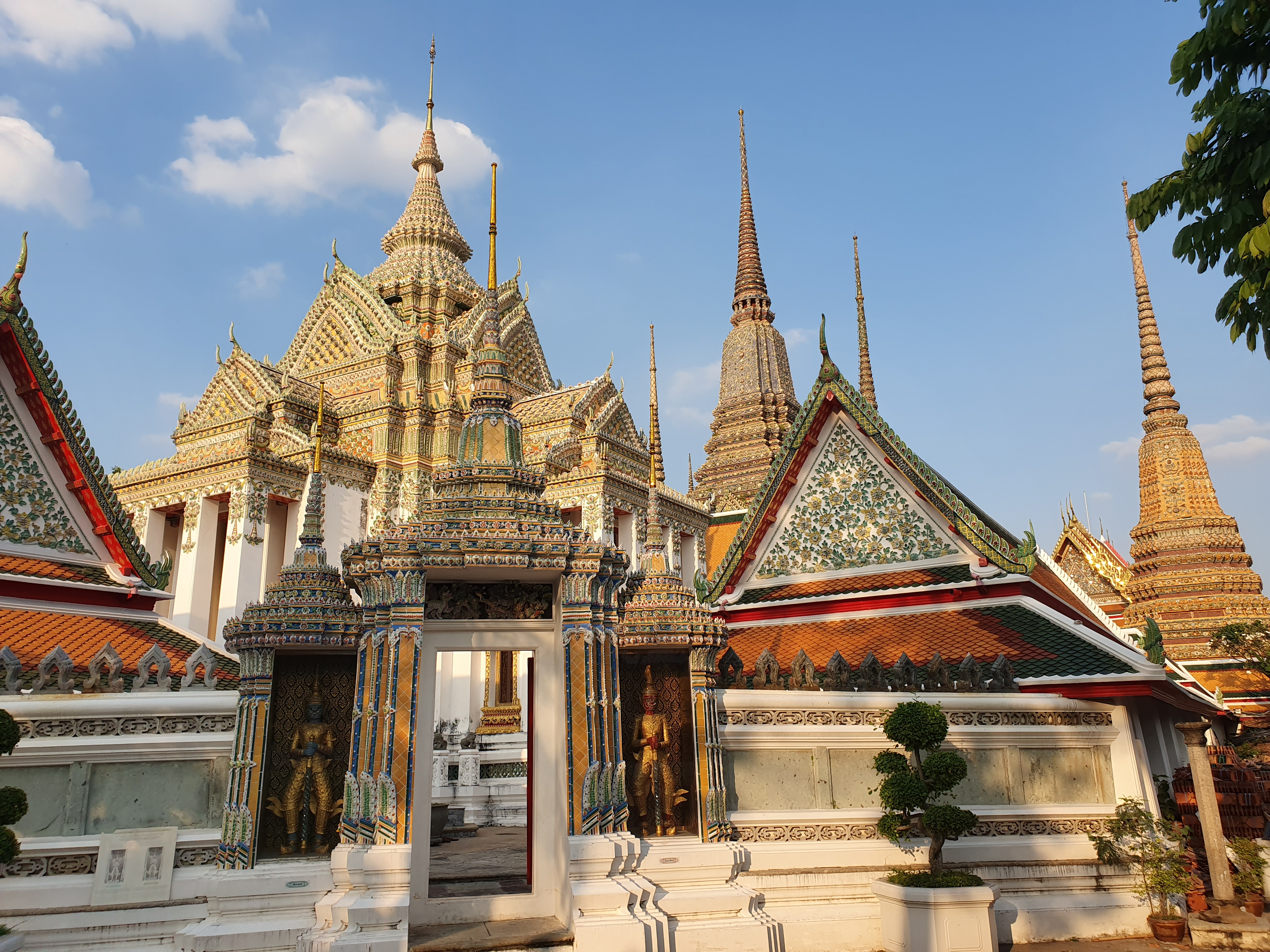

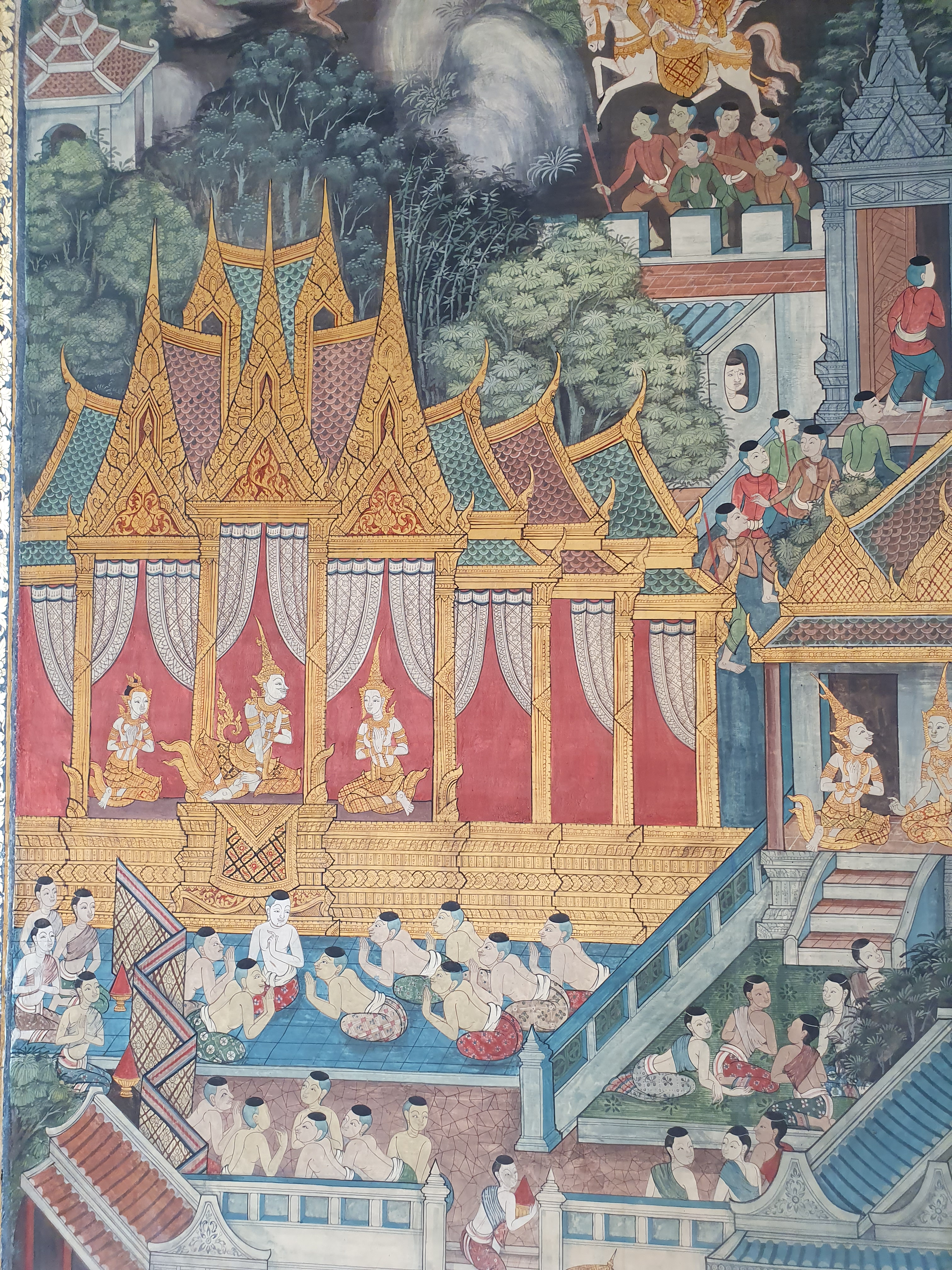

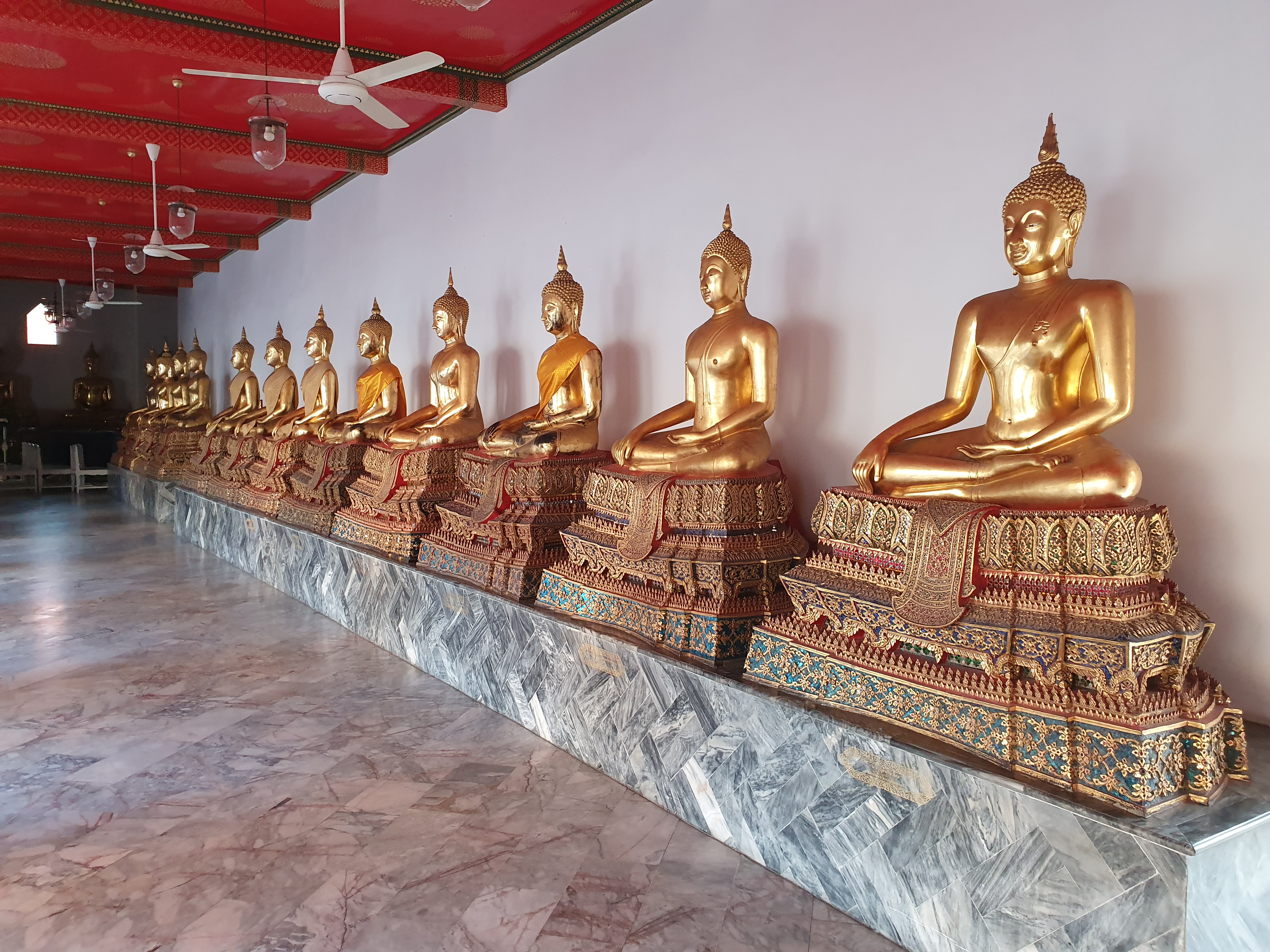

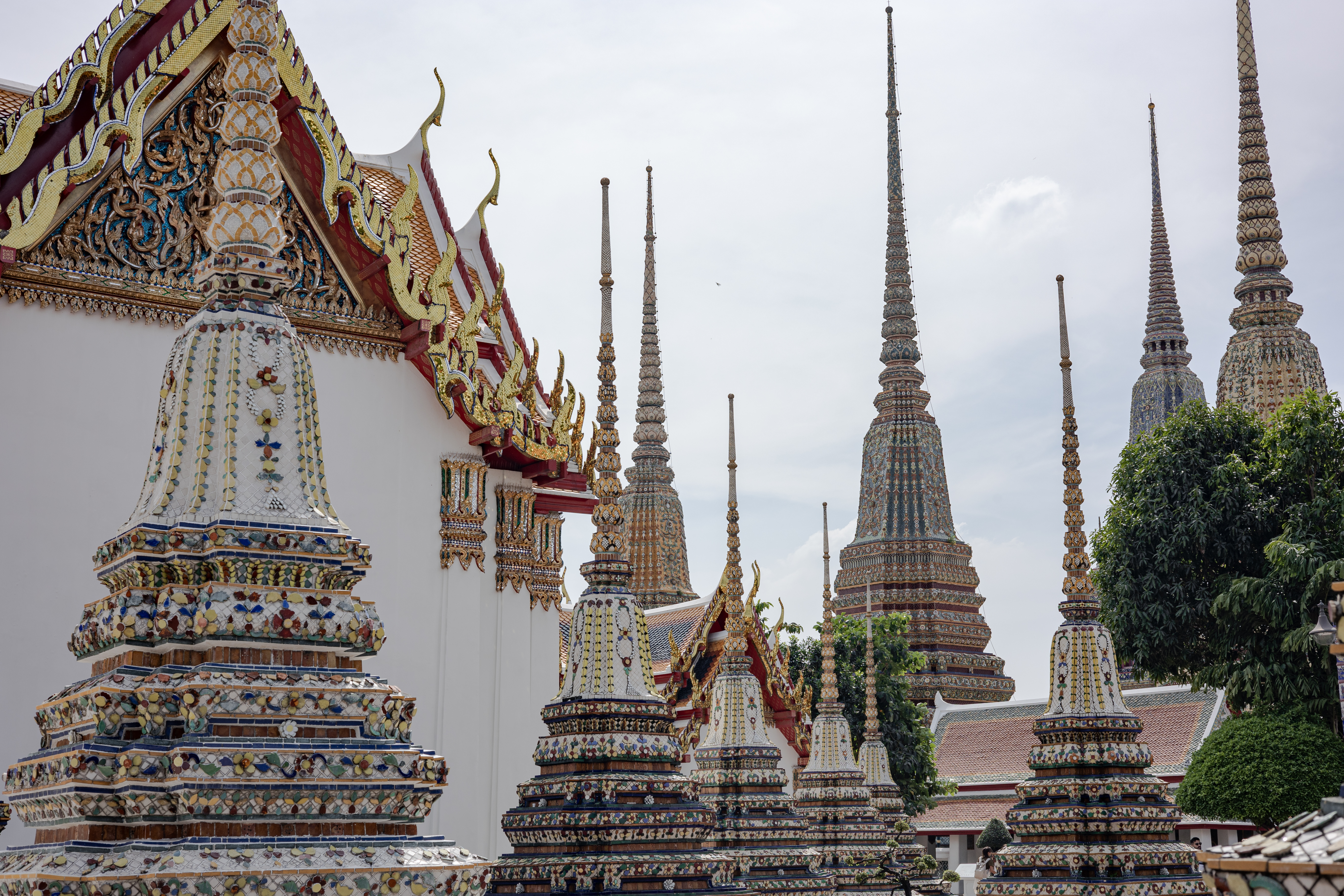

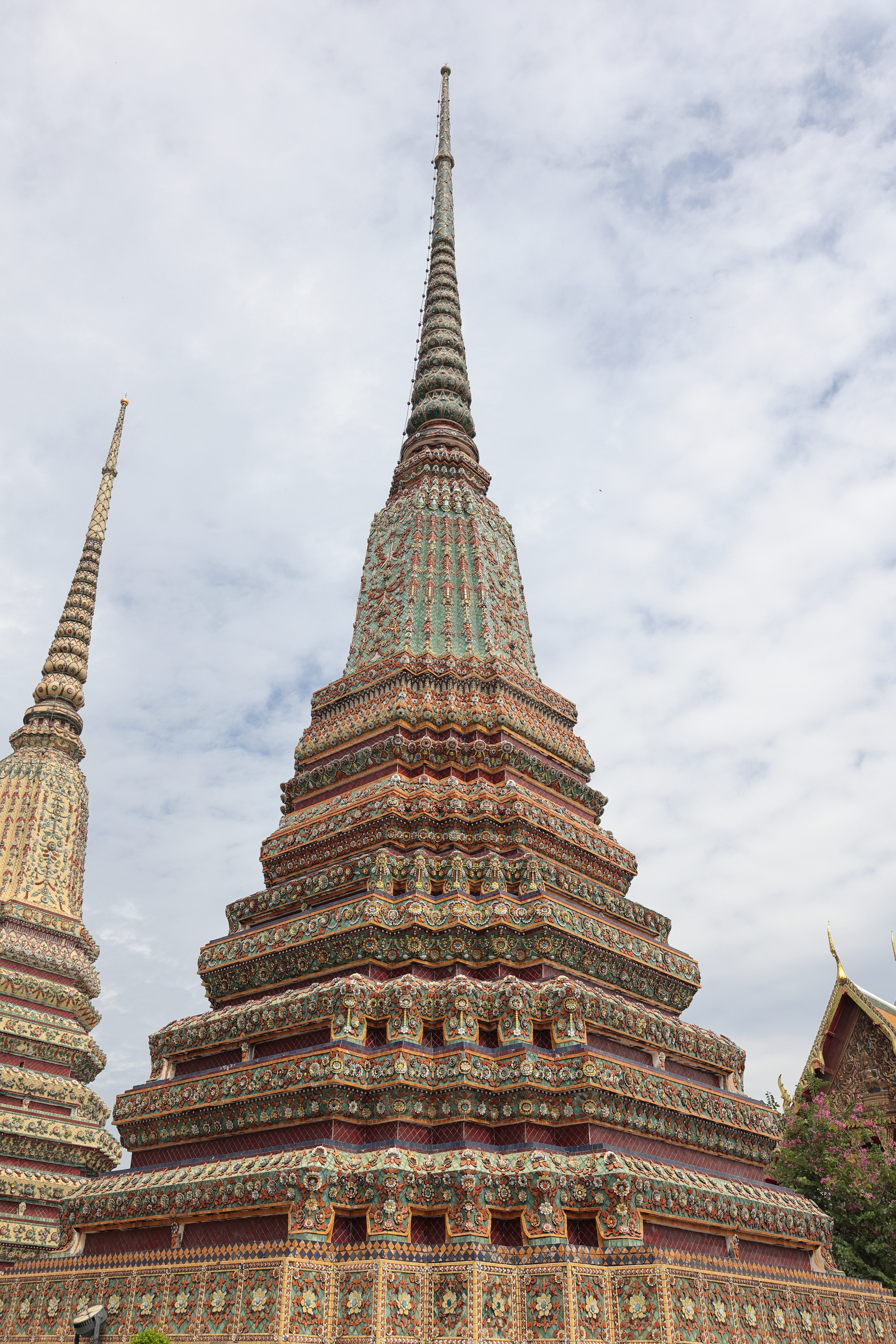

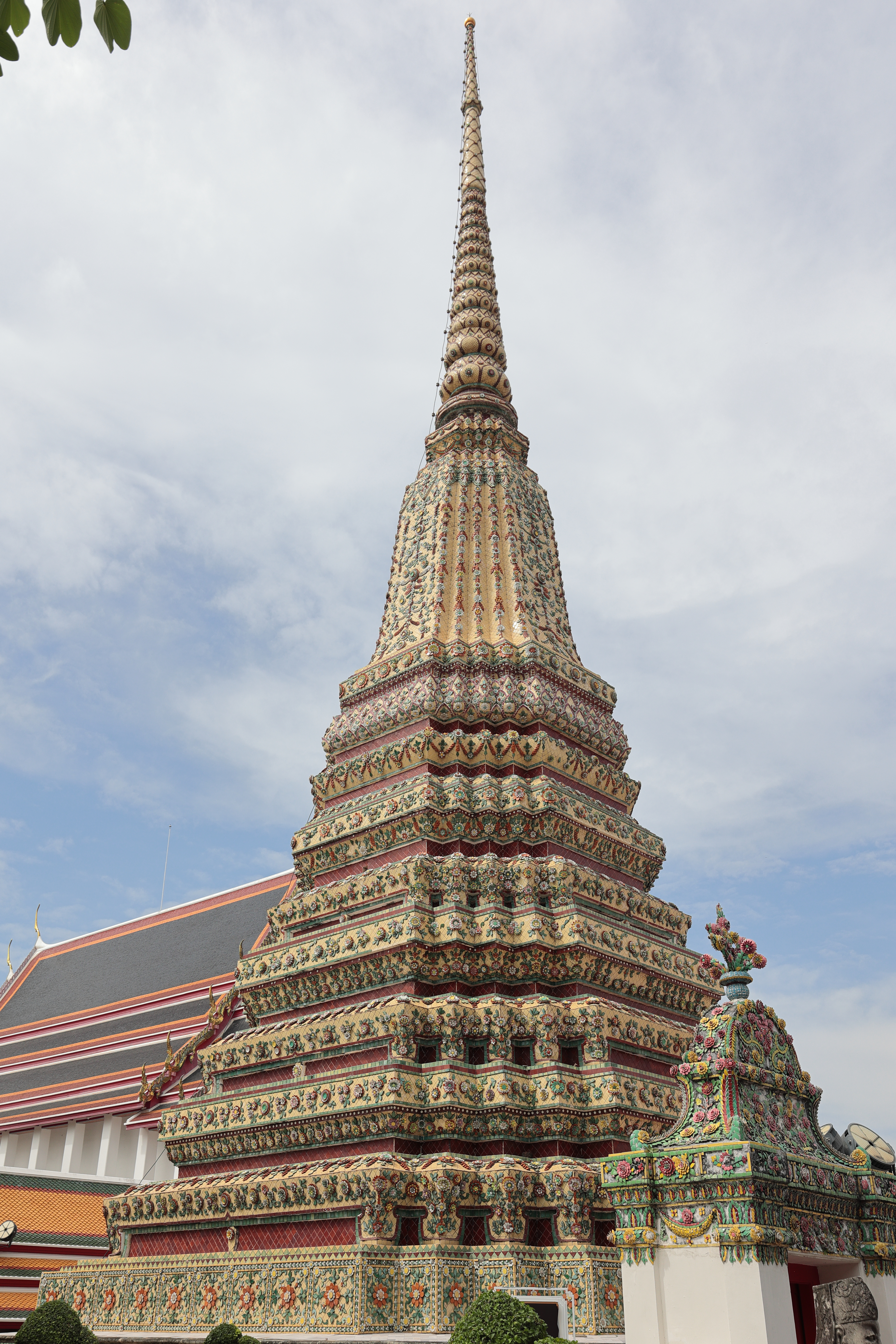

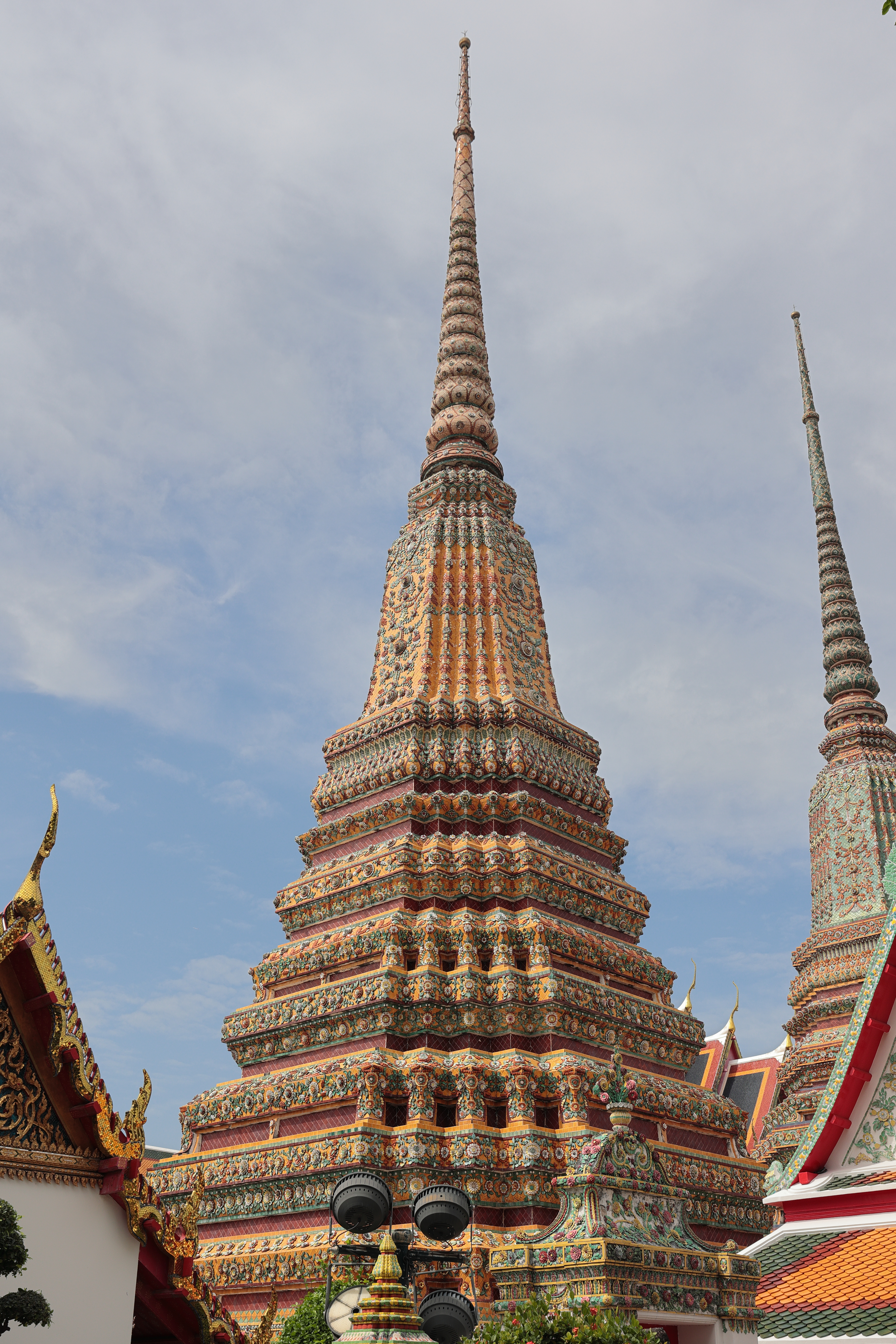

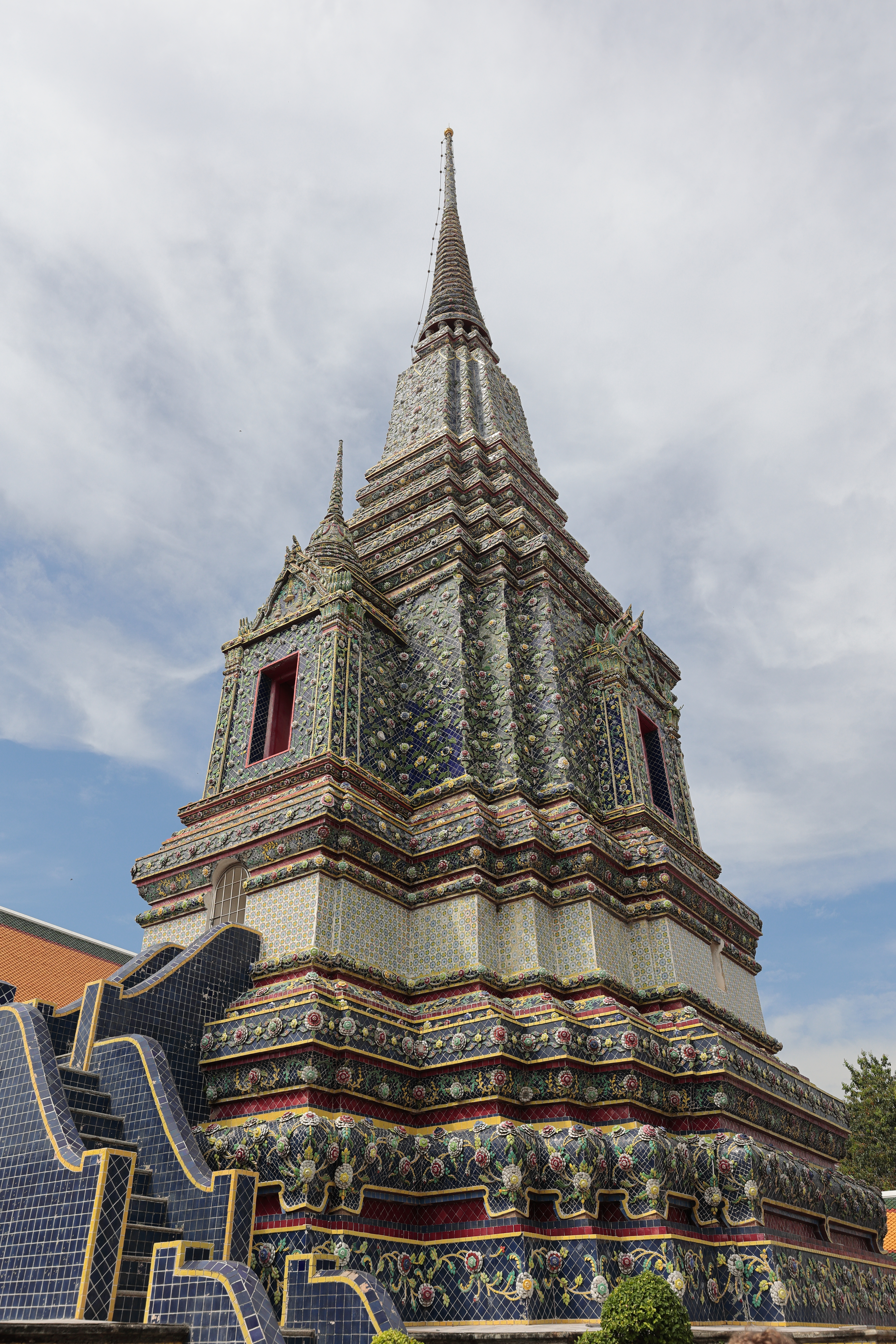

== See also ==
- List of Buddhist temples in Thailand
- Thai temple art and architecture
- Wat Phra Kaew
- Wat Arun
