= List of botanical gardens in Thailand =

Botanical gardens and arboreta in Thailand are operated by public agencies as well as private owners. The main state agencies that maintain botanical gardens are the Department of National Parks, Wildlife and Plant Conservation (DNP), which operates 18 botanical gardens and 53 arboreta throughout the country, and the Botanical Garden Organization, which operates five botanical gardens in Chiang Mai, Khon Kaen, Phitsanulok, Sukhothai and Rayong provinces.

== List of botanical gardens ==
- Nong Nooch Tropical Garden, Sattahip, Chon Buri – A large privately owned garden known for its ornamental displays, with some sections dedicated to botanical cataloguing
- Queen Sirikit Botanical Garden, Mae Rim, Chiang Mai – The country's first modern, scientifically oriented botanical garden; it serves as the main site and headquarters of the Botanical Garden Organization.
- Queen Sirikit Park, Bangkok – A public park operated by the Bangkok Metropolitan Administration, with botanical cataloguing
- Phu Khae Botanical Garden, Chaloem Phra Kiat District, Saraburi – The oldest botanical garden in the country, established in 1941 and now operated by the DNP.
- Royal Park Rajapruek, Mueang Chiang Mai, Chiang Mai – Originally created for the Royal Flora Ratchaphruek international expo, now operated by the Highland Research and Development Institute
- Suan Luang Rama IX, Bangkok – A large public park operated by the Suan Luang Rama 9 Foundation; the grounds include botanical gardens.
