= The Central Phaholyothin =

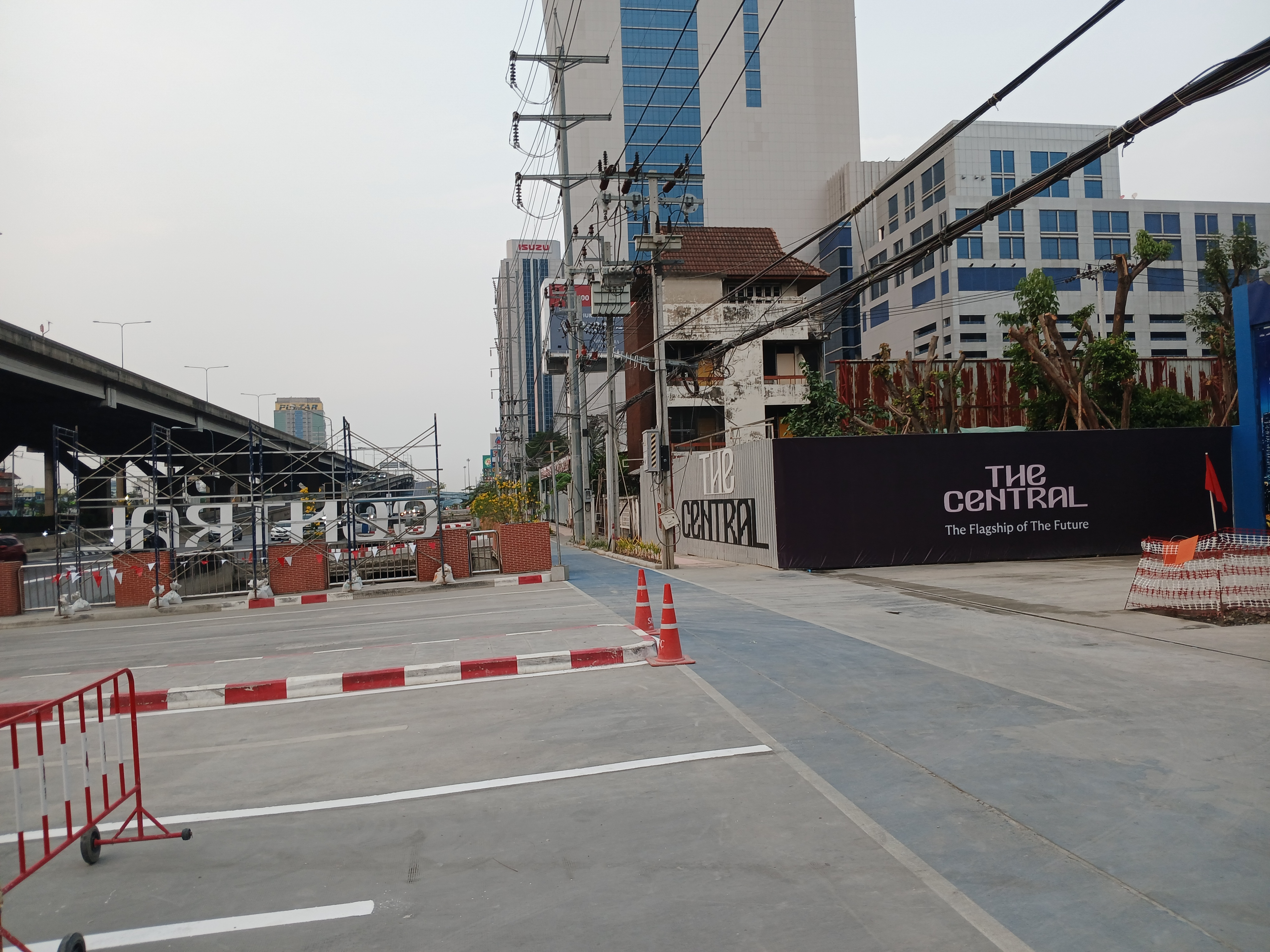
- The Central Phaholyothin as seen next to Vibhavadi Rangsit Road
- Location: Phahonyothin Road, Chatuchak subdistrict, Chatuchak district, Bangkok
- Coordinates: 13.821608°N 100.564016°E
- Opened: Year 2027
- Developer: Central Pattana
- Manager: Central Pattana
- Owner: Baywater Co., Ltd. , owned by: Central Pattana; Grand Canal Land
- Floor area: 457,409 square meters
- Floors: 11 floors
- Website: https://www.centralpattana.co.th/en/our-business/shopping-center/1351/the-central

The Central Phaholyothin (Thai: เดอะ เซ็นทรัล พหลโยธิน) (Note: Central Pattana officially refers to the building simply as The Central (เดอะ เซ็นทรัล), however, news outlets often call it as The Central Phaholyothin (เดอะ เซ็นทรัล พหลโยธิน) Previous name of the premise include Bangkok Dome Plaza (บางกอกโดม พลาซ่า) and Central North Pole (เซ็นทรัล นอร์ธโพล)) is a building under construction, located between Phahonyothin road (the section of the road between Ha Yaek Lat Phrao and Phahon Yothin 24 BTS stations) and Vibhavadi Rangsit Road in Chatuchak subdistrict, Chatuchak district, Bangkok. The building is owned by Baywater Co., Ltd. which is owned by Central Pattana and Grand Canal Land and will include a shopping mall, a hotel, an office building as well as condominium units. The building is expected to open in 2027.

== History ==
Initially, Uniwest Land Co., Ltd. (บริษัท ยูนิเวสต์ แลนด์ จำกัด), a company owned by Chatri Boondicharoen (ชาตรี บุญดีเจริญ), planned to build Bangkok Dome Plaza (บางกอกโดม พลาซ่า) building. The planned 45-storey building would contain a shopping mall, a hotel, an office building, two condominium buildings as well as an amusement park with the theme of underwater world (โลกใต้น้ำ) and would have the budget of 10000 million Thai Baht, a big investment at the time. The condominium units had been available for pre-order since 1994 and 70% of units were sold, raking in around 5000 million Thai Baht. However the project would collapse due to the litigation against the company caused by 1997 Asian financial crisis. Resulting in the Legal Execution Department of the Ministry of Justice (Thailand) to confiscate the plot of land to be resold. Whilst Uniest Land, as well as Chatri Boondicharoen, went bankrupt.

In 2007, the Legal Execution Department had put out the plot of land up for auction. CP group, Central group, TCC group as well as Siam Commercial Bank expressed interested in the plot of land. However, once the news about the auction spread, several debtors of Uniwest Land sued the Legal Execution Department for damages caused by the old debt as well as requesting that the Legal Execution Department put the auction on hold until the debt is cleared. Causing the auction to be put on hold, and Bangkok Commercial Asset Management Co., Ltd. (BAM) one of Uniwest Land's debtors decided to acquire all debt belonging to Uniwest Land to clear the debt, giving way for the Legal Execution Department to reopen the auction. In 2015, the auction was completed with Grand Canal Land, a company owned by Yothin Boondicharoen, and Unicorn Enterprise Co., Ltd., a company owned by BTS Group Holdings joining the auction. Eventually, Baywater Co., Ltd., a joint venture between Grand Canal Land and Unicorn Enterprise won the auction at the bidding of 7350 million THB. and BAM received 5300 million THB from the Legal Execution Department in the auction.

After the auction has ended in 2016, BTS Group allocated 200 million THB budget to be used for the construction of a new 8-lane road over 10-rai land in the plot to connect Vibhavadi Rangsit Road with Phahonyothin Road, alleviating the traffic caused by the construction of the section of Sukhumvit Line which would pass through the section of Phahonyothin Road next to the plot of land, as well as planning to have the northern terminus of Yellow Line (Bangkok) on the proposed road. (As BTS Group won the concession over the operation of the line) Further plans includes cutting a part of the plot of land to sell to Sansiri to build condominium buildings as well as other companies including Central Group to develop the rest of the 38-rai land, making a new satellite city in northern Bangkok. However, the Mass Rapid Transit Authority of Thailand rejected the proposal to build the station on that proposed road. Causing the proposed northern Yellow Line terminus to be moved to Ratchayothin Intersection where Ratchadaphisek Road and Phahonyothin Road meets, specifically, in front of Phaholyothin police station where the land is owned by State Railway of Thailand, hindering BTS Group's plan to develop the land. (Note: Although the Yellow Line (Bangkok) is currently operational, the proposal to build this station is still not materialized due to opposition by Bangkok Expressway and Metro, a rival metro operator in Bangkok. Causing Lat Phrao MRT station to become the northern terminus of the line instead. See Yellow Line (Bangkok) § Northern extension for more information.)

In 2018, Yothin Boondicharoen, sold all of his shares in Grand Canal Land for CPN Pattaya Co., Ltd. , a company owned by Central Pattana, in order to quit the real estate business Causing BTS group to also sell all of their shares to Central Pattana as well in 2019. Causing the plot of land to have their ownership transferred to Chirathivat family, owner of Central Group, who owned the plot of land to this day.

In 2022, Central Pattana allocated 10000 million THB for the development of the project, with 5000 million THB for the direct investment and the other 5000 million THB for investment via Grand Canal Land. The project is planned to contain a shopping mall, a hotel, a condominium building and an office building, intended by Central Pattana to be their replacement of Central Ladprao shopping mall and Centara Grand at Central Plaza Ladprao hotel as the land where these two buildings are located on is on lease from State Railway of Thailand and the lease was soon to expire in 2028 (However, the lease would later be extended to 2058.) With the project getting greenlit on 9 November 2022 And the construction resumed from the foundation pile on 1 December 2022

Later, Central Pattana announced that they have doubled their budget for the project to the total of 20000 million THB, aiming to create a large shopping mall. With working title during construction as Central North Pole (เซ็นทรัล นอร์ธโพล) Before revealing the official name on 20 March 2025 as The Central (เดอะ เซ็นทรัล) and the project was officially unveiled on 8 October 2025. being the 4th flagship shopping malls of Central Pattana and Central Group after CentralWorld, Central Embassy, Dusit Central Park; cerebrating 45 years of Central Pattana.
