= School uniforms in Thailand =

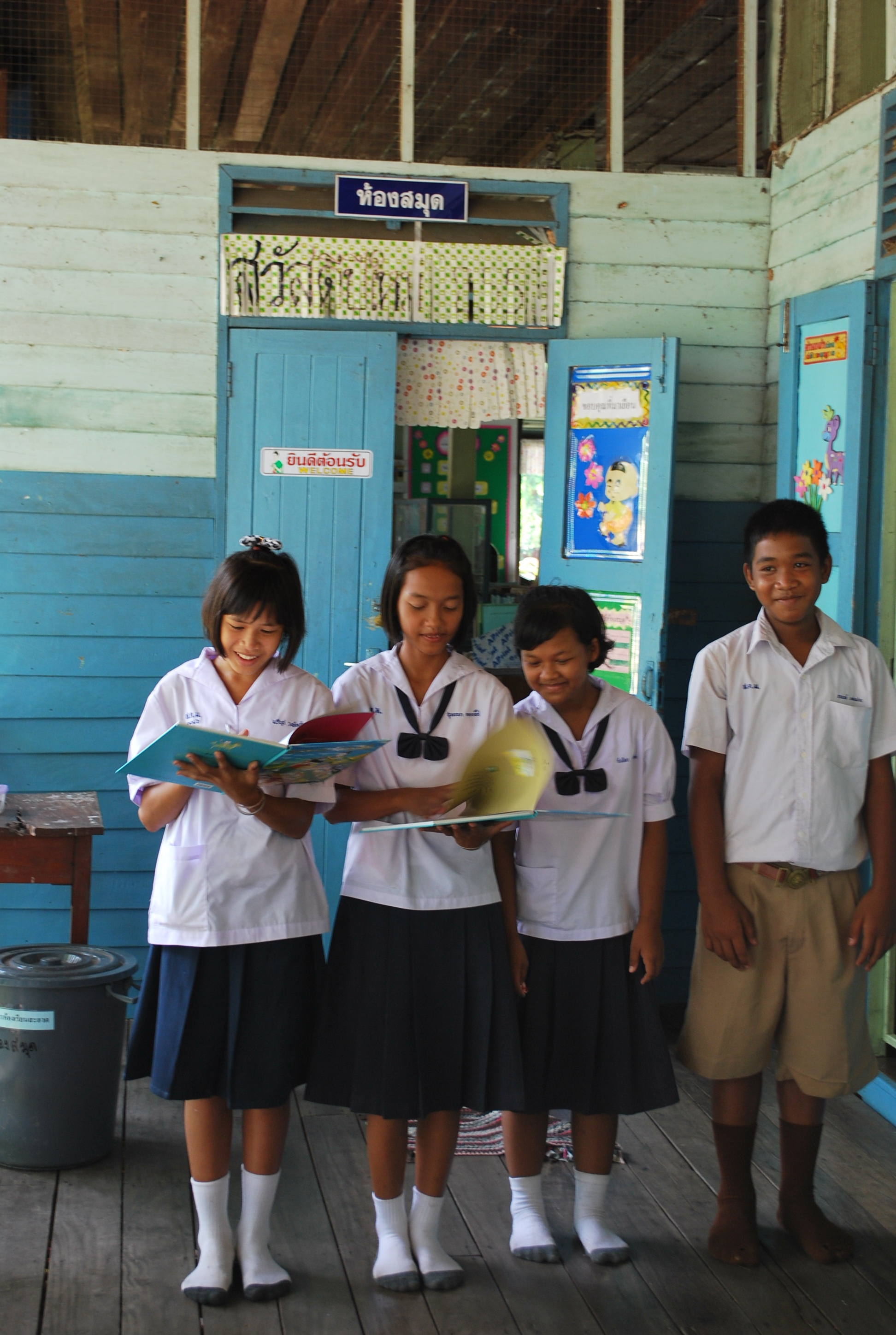
Thai School Uniform

The Thai school uniform is compulsory for students in Thai public and private school systems, not including a higher education institute which provides degree level education. Few variations from the standard model are permitted, but schools are not restricted from adopting additional, non-standard uniforms. Most Thai schools have day per week where students wear either boy scout and girl guide uniforms to school, and partake in scouting activities in addition to regular classes. These uniforms are beige for boys and dark green for girls, both wearing neckerchiefs.

== Public schools ==
	Boys	Girls
Top	Shirts Most male students wear a white shirt with a left breast pocket. Initials or logo on the left breast and the name of the school or student ID number on the right breast. Embroidery in red or blue.	Blouses: Elementary students: White blouse similar to boys' shirts, untucked shirttails; Secondary school: White blouse similar to boys' shirts, can have a ribbon and untucked shirttails; Upper secondary students: White shirt similar to boys' shirts
Bottom	Pants and belt Three styles: 1. Khaki shorts with brown leather belt 2. Black shorts with leather belt in black or brown 3. Blue shorts with belt, black or brown	Skirt: Navy blue with six pleats in front and six in back
Shoes, Socks	1. Khaki shorts wears brown socks and brown shoes 2. Black or blue shorts wears white socks and black shoes	Black leather shoes and white socks or Black Tights

Typical school uniforms

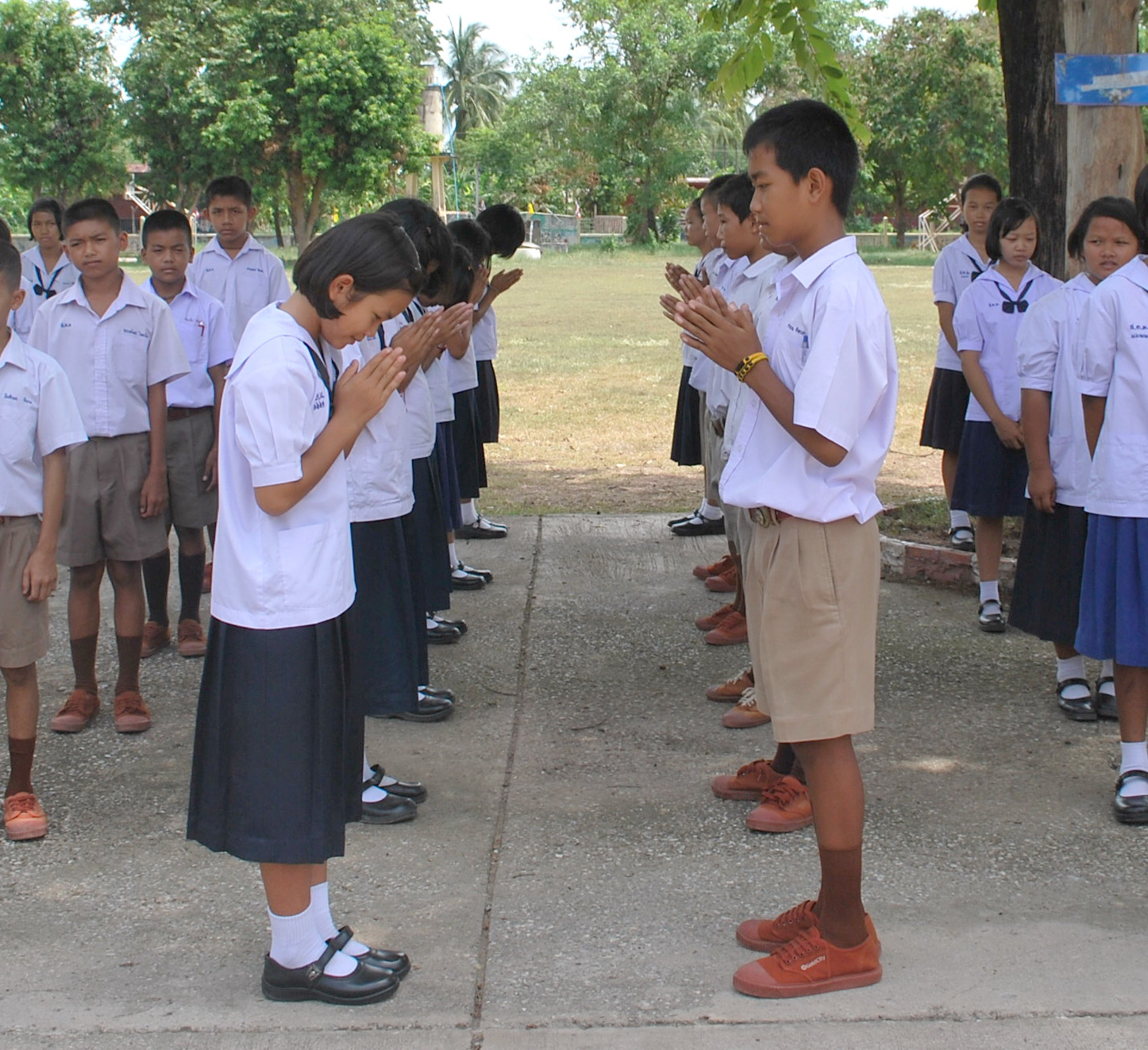
Girl's and boys' school uniforms at Baan Hat Seua Ten School, Uttaradit

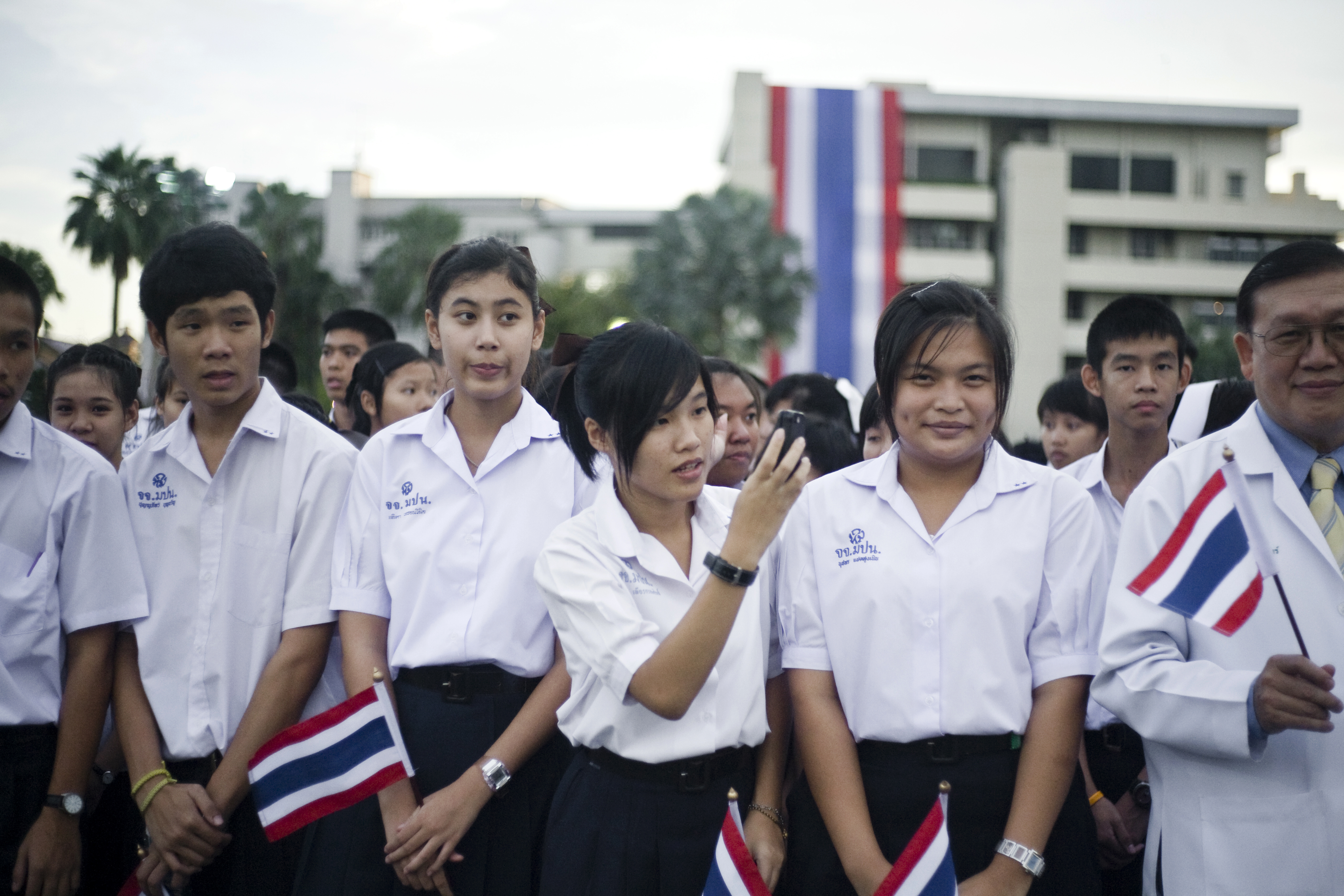
Girls' and boys' school uniform with black skirt and shorts

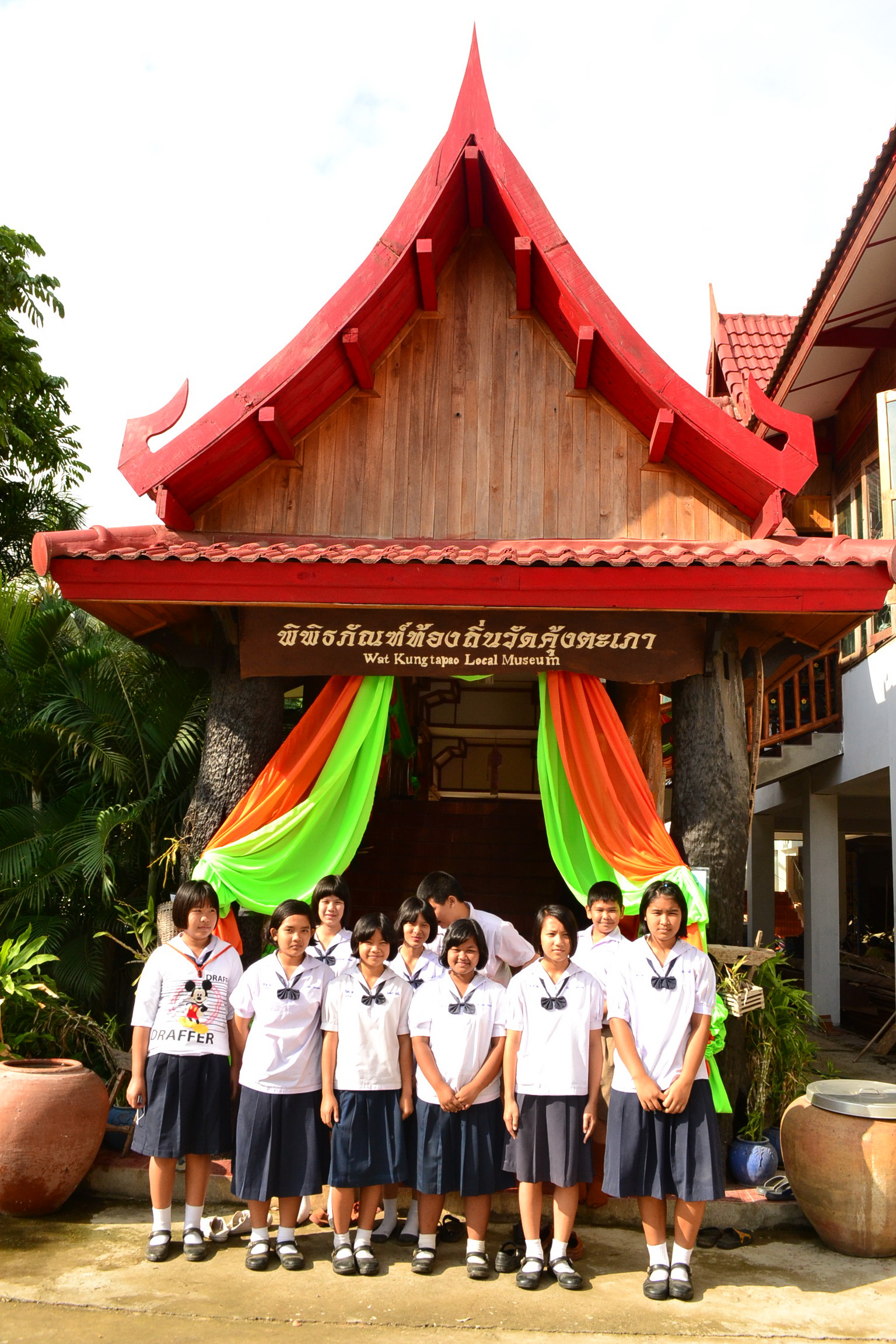
Girl's uniform, taken at Wat Khung Taphao, Ban Khung Taphao

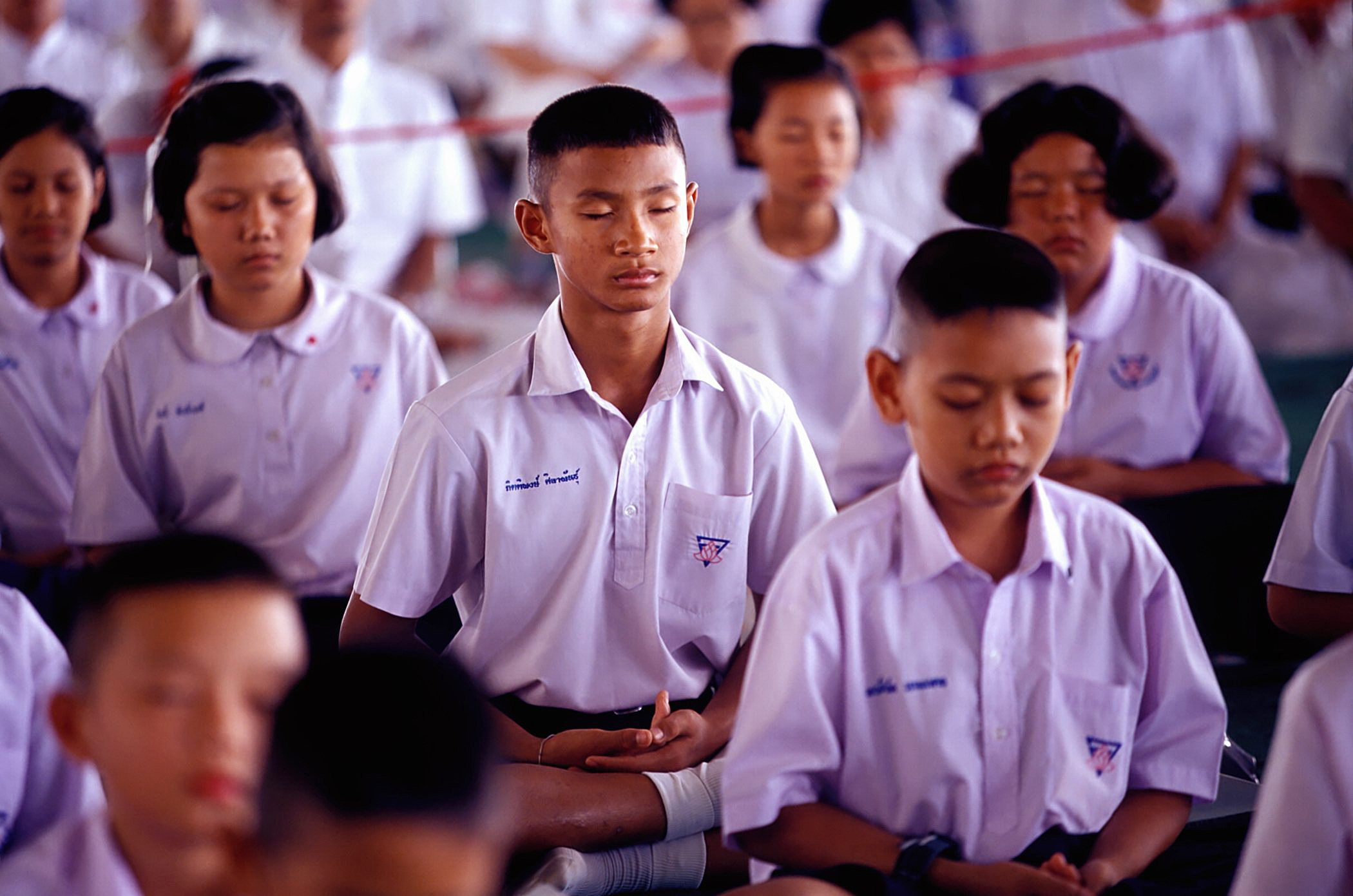
Uniform with name embed on the shirt

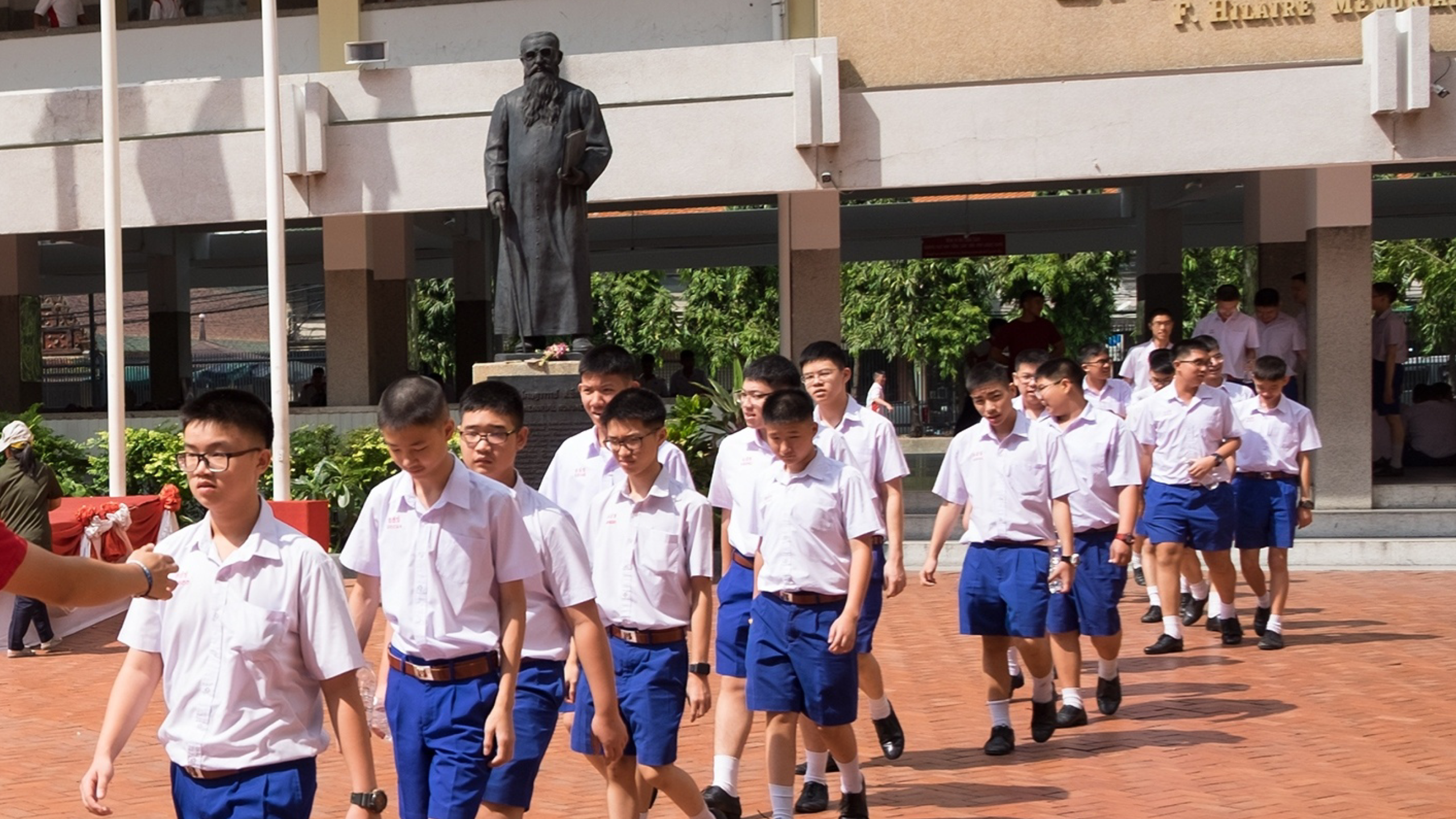
Boy's uniform of Assumption College (Bangkok) with dark blue shorts

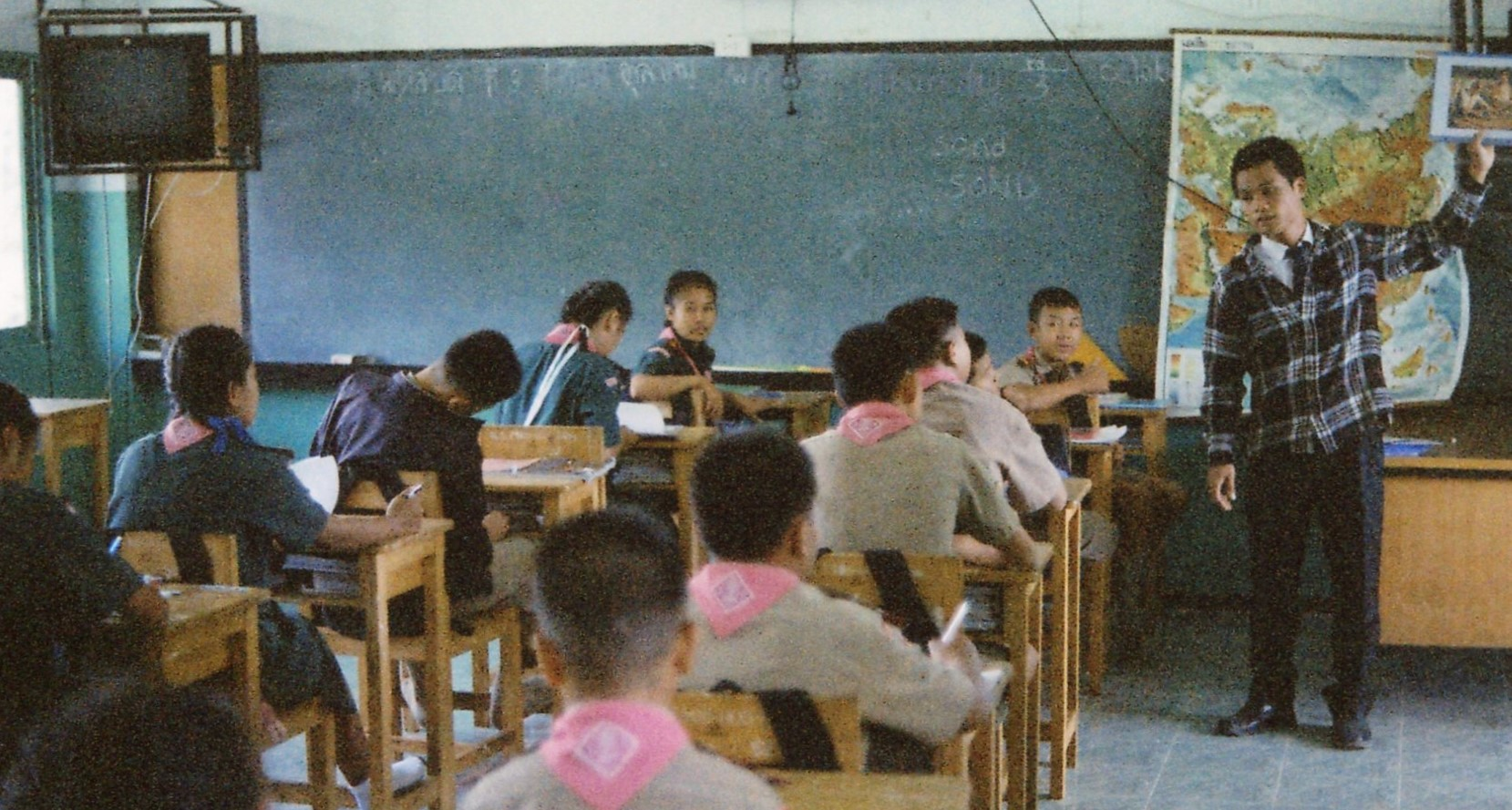
Students wearing their scouts and guides uniforms in a rural public school

== University ==
University uniforms are generally standard throughout the country. They typically consist of a white blouse and plain or pleated skirt for females, and long black trousers, a white long-sleeved shirt with a dark blue or black tie for males. There are minor variations for Muslim or transgender students. Thai university dress codes have been the subject of both controversy and satire. Research has indicated that the wearing of uniforms reinforces in-group and out-group behaviours and existing hierarchies, but "does not promote students' life goals".

Typical university uniforms

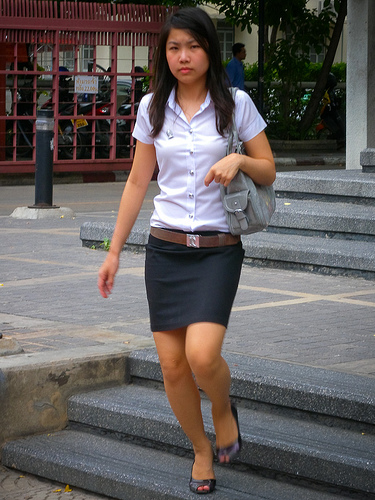
Female Chulalongkorn University uniform

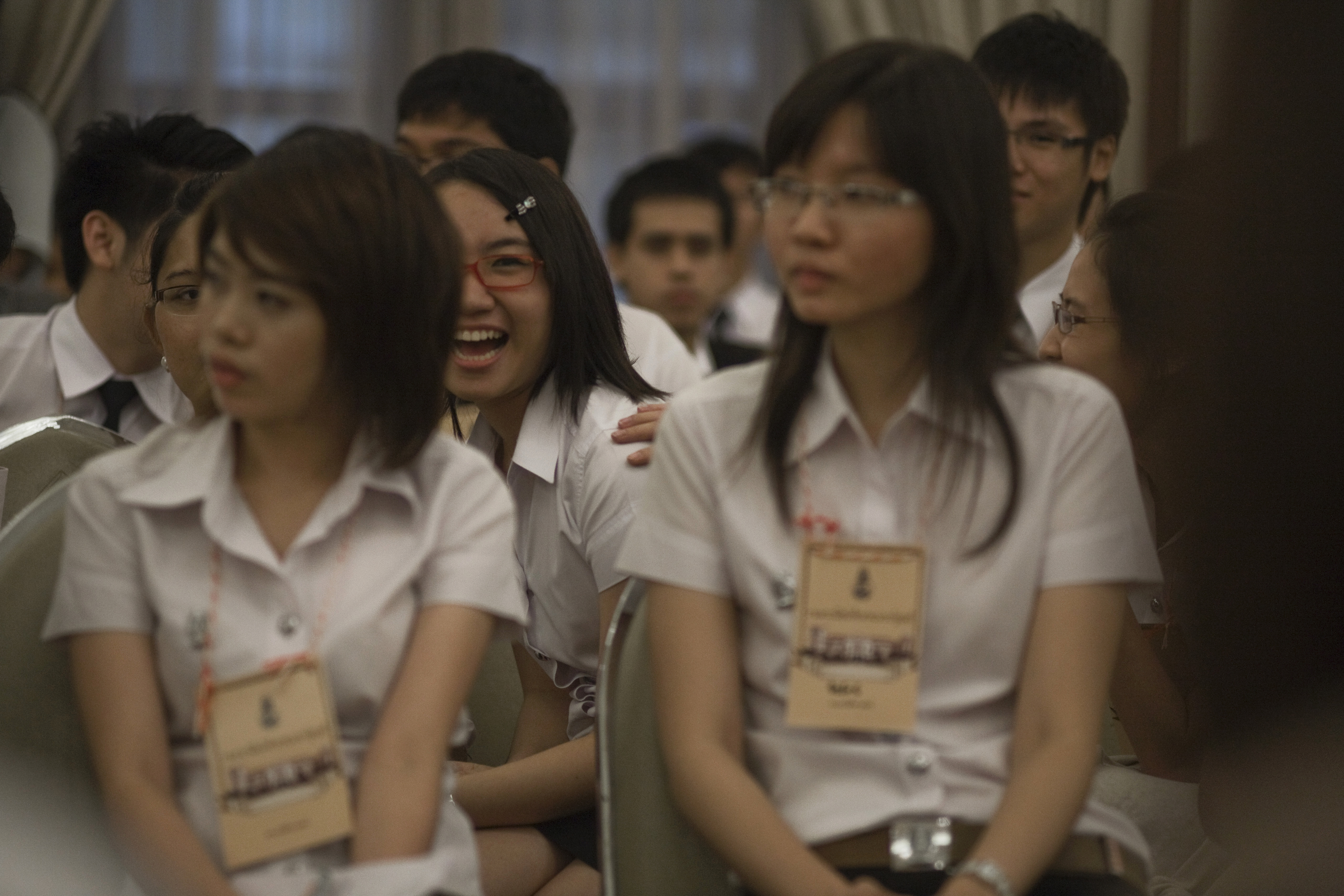
Chulalongkorn students

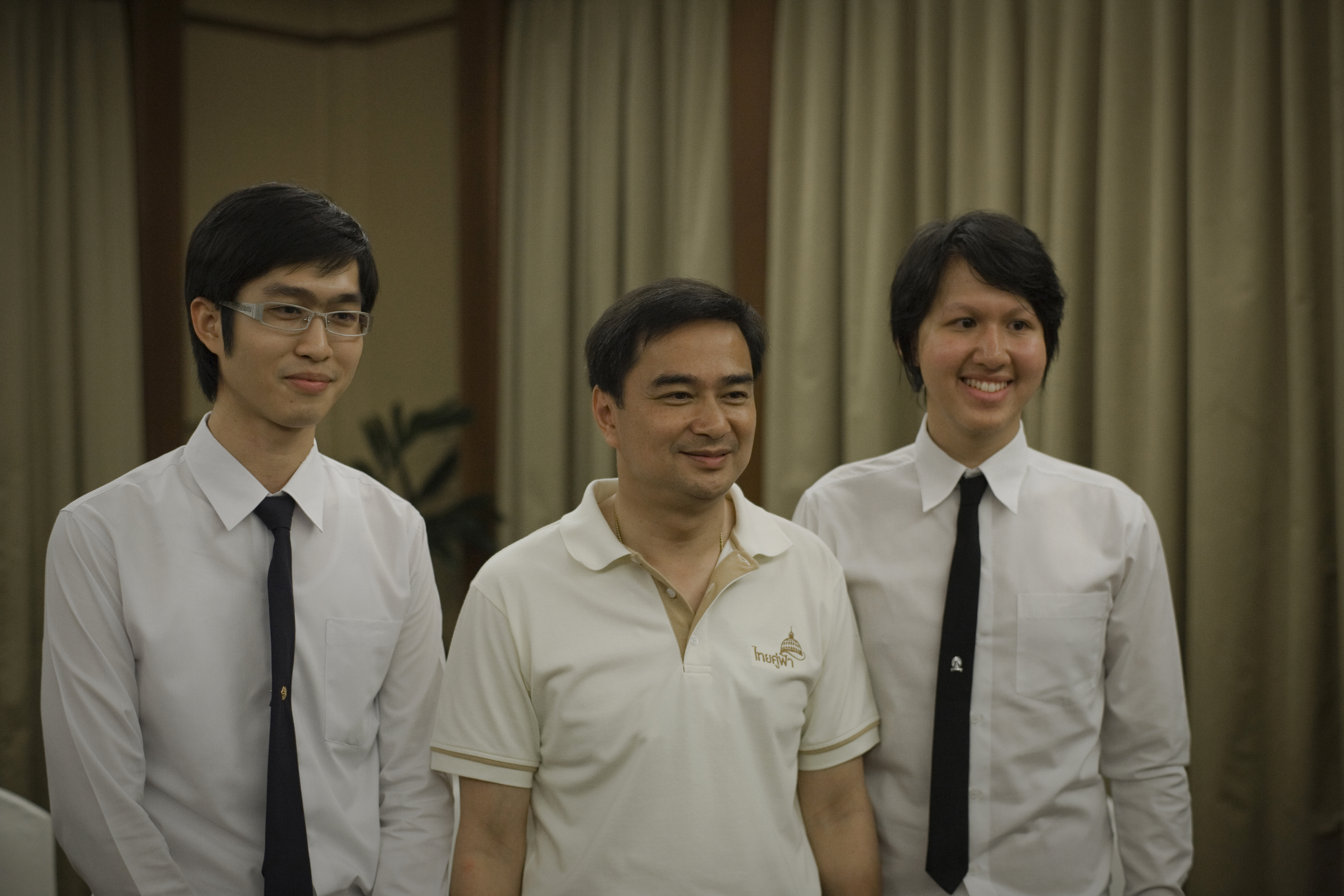
Chulalongkorn students wearing male university uniforms with former Prime Minister Abhisit Vejjajiva.

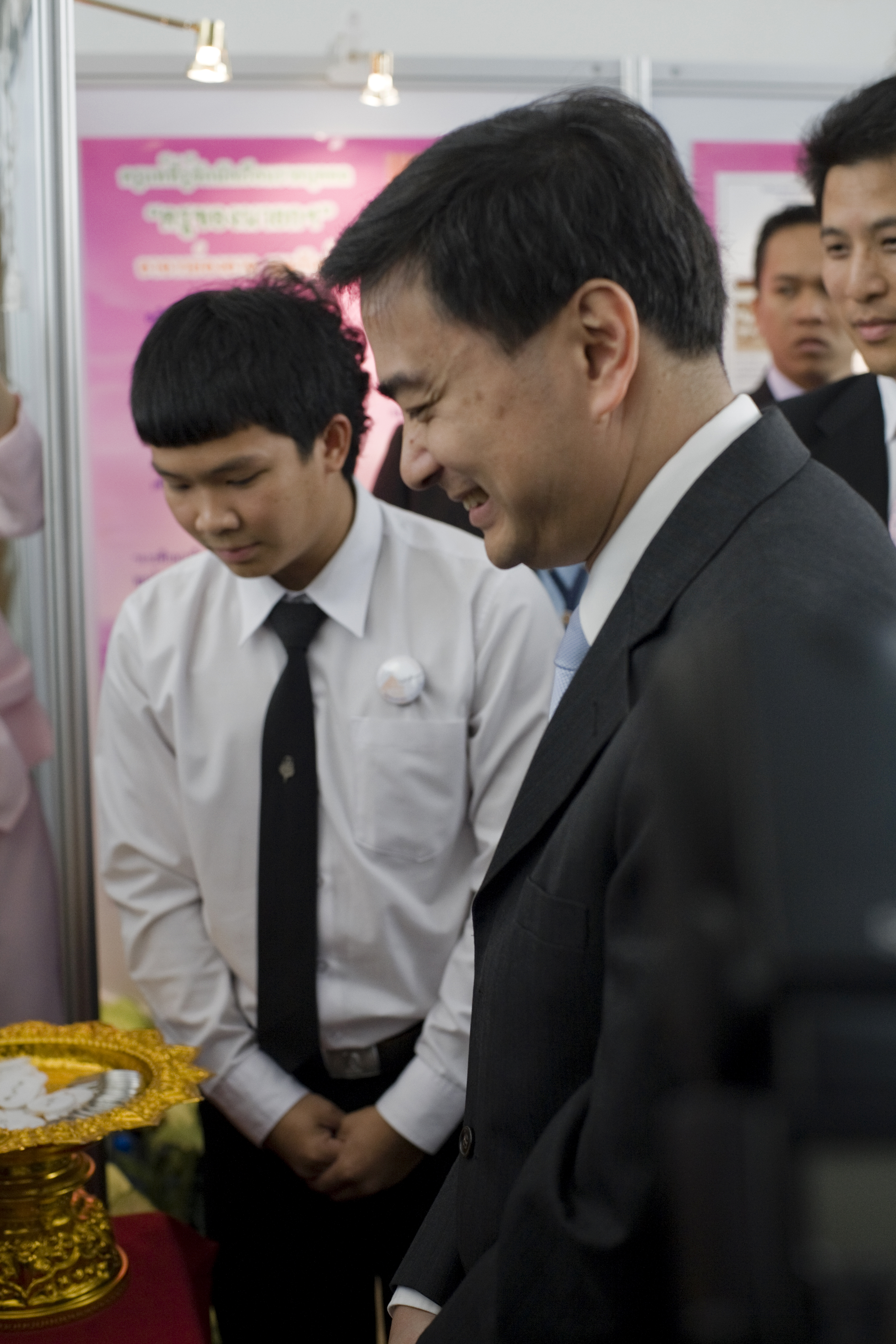
Chulalongkorn students

== Controversy ==
On 1 December 2020, Thai school students, who have been helping to lead the pro-democracy protests, have refused to wear school uniforms on the first day of term, in a defiant protest to demand individual freedom over their lives and their bodies. They used the hashtag #1ธันวาบอกลาเครื่องแบบ (#1DecemberDownwiththeuniform) on Twitter, and invited every students to wear casual clothes instead. This gained many attractions from both the media, and the government. After a while in that day, the students in many schools; such as Horwang School, Bodindecha (SS) School who wore such clothes were punished by their own teachers, with some exception occurred in Samsen Wittayalai School — one of Thailand's most selective schools — which have responded positively to the protest. Students posted photos and stories of how the school staff and director have stood in front of the gates to welcome students in casual wear to freely enter and learn inside their classrooms.

Student communities began to question the necessity of the uniform, and seek the new solution towards their demand for reform of the country.

== See also ==
- School uniform
- Education in Thailand
