= Chatuchak subdistrict =

Chatuchak จตุจักร
- Khwaeng
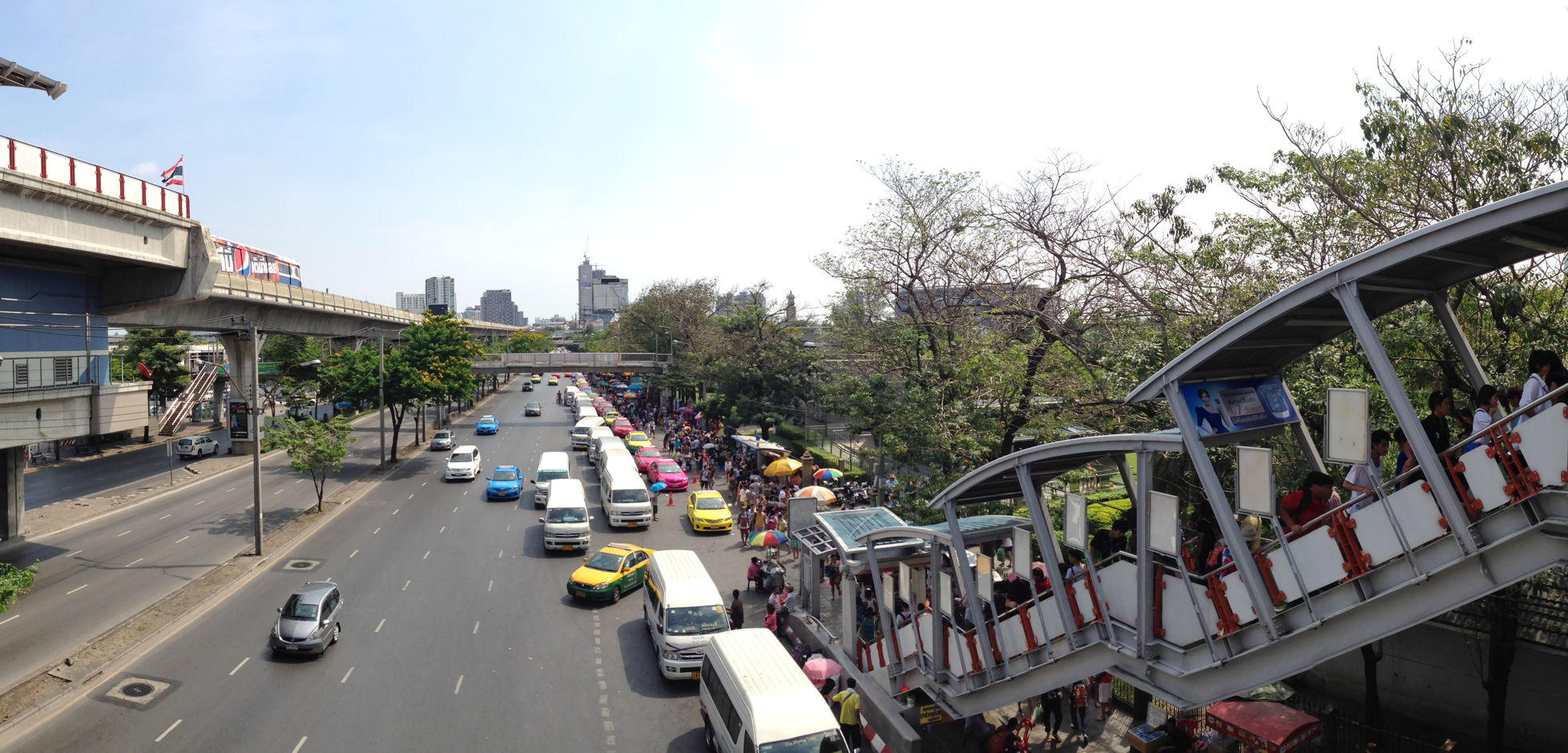
- Outside Chatuchak Park near Mo Chit Station and Chatuchak Park Station (taken from Chatuchak side)

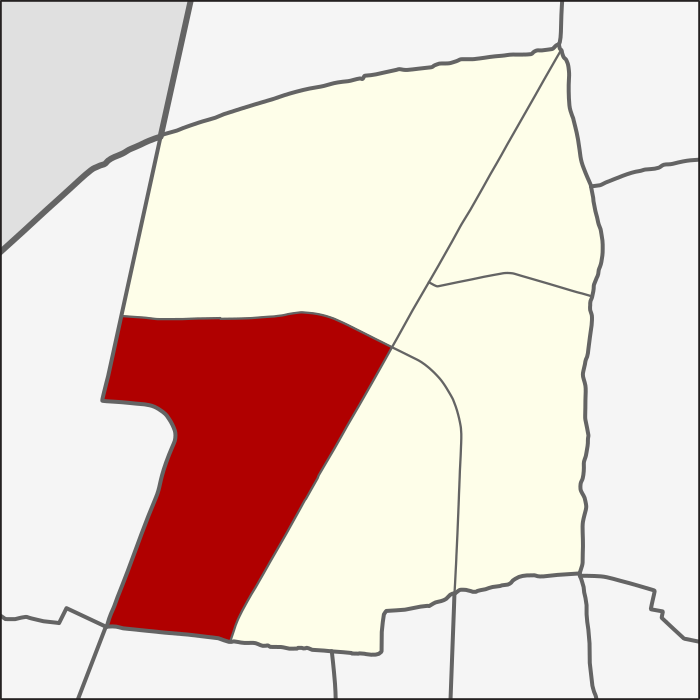
- Location in Chatuchak District
- Country: Thailand
- Province: Bangkok
- Khet: Chatuchak
- Named for: Chatuchak Park

Area
  - Total: 7.878 km^{2} (3.042 sq mi)

Population (2021)
  - Total: 21,853
- Time zone: UTC+7 (ICT)
- Postal code: 10900
- TIS 1099: 103005

Chatuchak (Thai: จตุจักร, pronounced [t͡ɕàʔ.tùʔ.t͡ɕàk]) is a khwaeng (subdistrict) of Chatuchak District, Bangkok, Thailand. It is a location of the district office.

== History ==
The name Chatuchak after Chatuchak Park, a public park was built on the occasion of King Bhumibol Adulyadej (Rama IX)'s fourth cycle (48 years old) anniversary (Chatuchak means "fourth cycle"). In late 2003 it was officially declared a subdistrict along with four other subdistricts in Chatuchak.

== Geography ==
Chatuchak is an area in the southwest of the district. It is bounded by (from the north clockwise): Lat Yao in its district (Ratchadaphisek Road is a borderline), Chomphon in its district (Phaholyothin Road is a borderline), Phaya Thai in Phaya Thai District (Khlong Bang Sue is a borderline), Bang Sue in Bang Sue District (Khlong Prapa and Southern Railway Line are the borderlines).

== Places ==
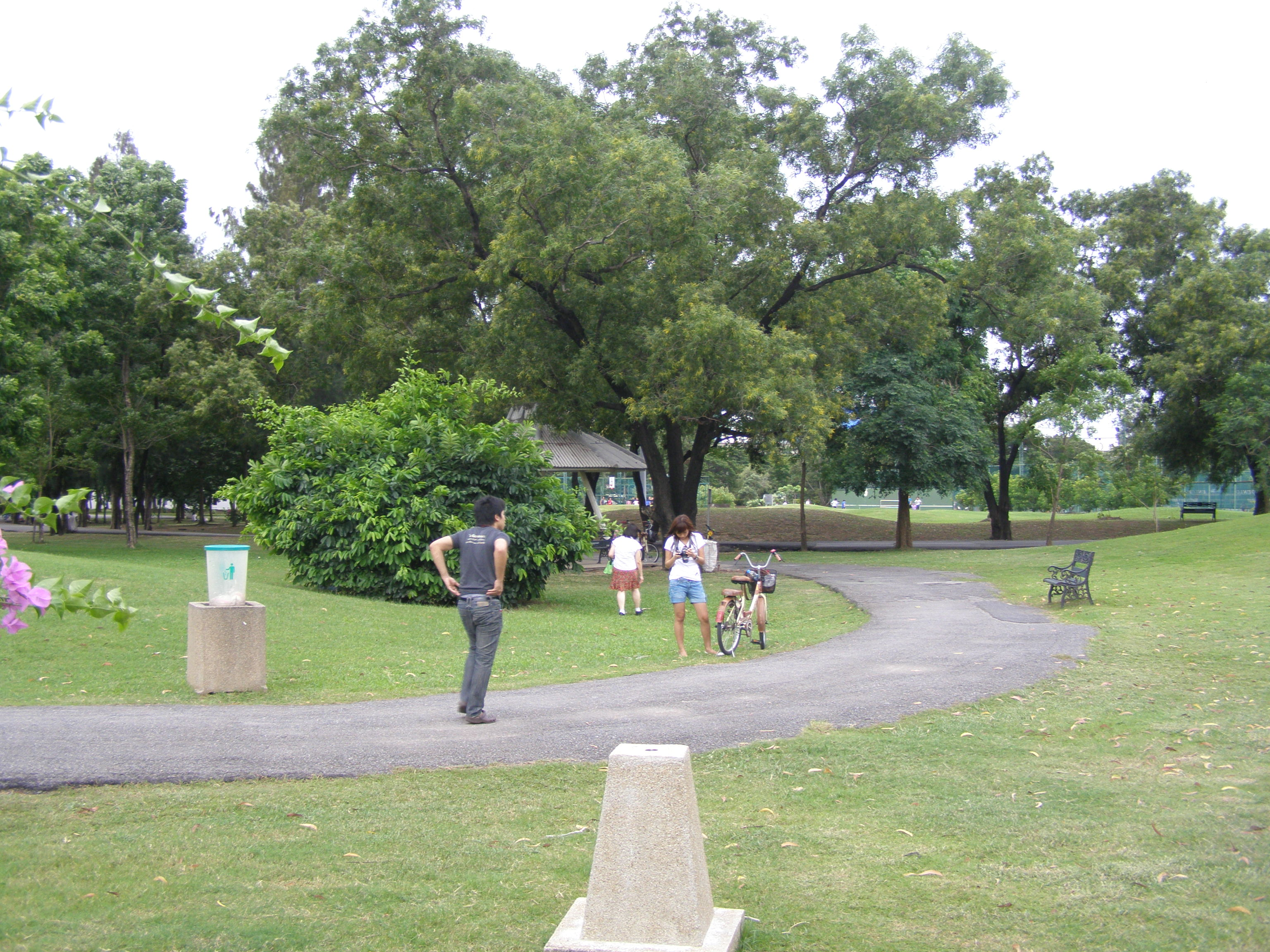
Vachirabenjatas Park or colloquially known as Rot Fai Park

- Chatuchak Park
- Chatuchak Weekend Market (JJ Market)
- Vachirabenjatas Park (Rot Fai Park)
- Queen Sirikit Park
- Children's Discovery Museum Bangkok 1
- JJ Mall
- CentralPlaza Lardprao
- Centara Grand at Central Plaza Ladprao Bangkok
- Hall of Railway Heritage (closed)
- Ministry of Energy and PTT Headquarters
- International Civil Aviation Organization (ICAO) Asia and Pacific Office
- Or Tor Kor Market
- Horwang School
- Princess Mother 84 Garden

== Transportation ==
- Mo Chit Station
- Chatuchak Park Station
- Kamphaeng Phet Station
- Phahon Yothin Station
- Ha Yaek Lat Phrao Station
- Chatuchak Station
- Bang Sue Grand Station
- Bang Sue Junction Railway Station
- Nikhom Rotfai km 11 Railway Halt
- Bangkok Bus Terminal (Chatuchak), familiarly called Mo Chit 2 or New Mo Chit
