= Chomphon subdistrict =

Chomphon จอมพล
- Khwaeng
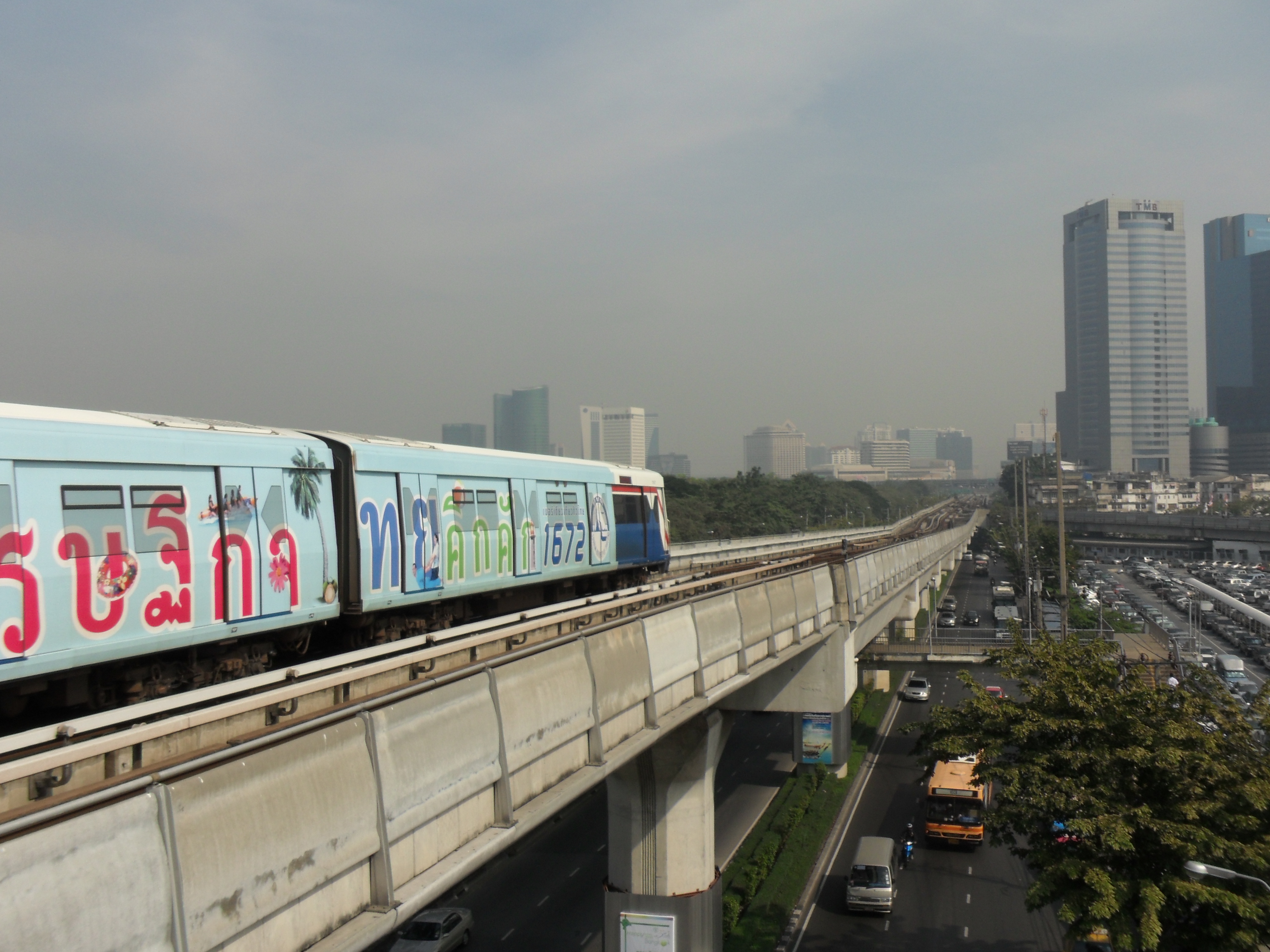
- BTS Skytrain heading to Lat Phrao Square above Phaholyothin Road (taken from Chomphon side)
- Etymology: "Field Marshal"
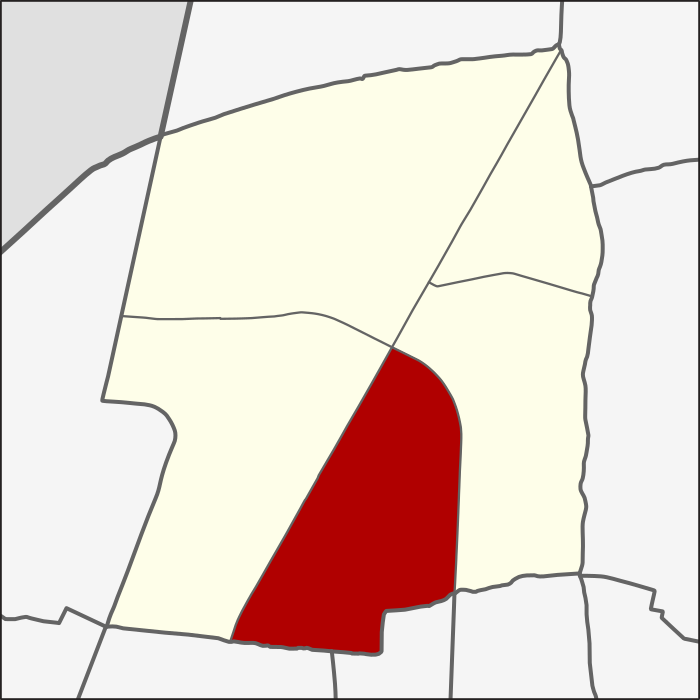
- Location in Chatuchak District
- Country: Thailand
- Province: Bangkok
- Khet: Chatuchak
- Named for: Soi Lat Phrao 15

Area
  - Total: 5.488 km^{2} (2.119 sq mi)

Population (2021)
  - Total: 33,250
- Time zone: UTC+7 (ICT)
- Postal code: 10900
- TIS 1099: 103004

Chomphon (Thai: จอมพล, pronounced [t͡ɕɔ̄ːm.pʰōn]), also spelled Chom Phon, is a khwaeng (subdistrict) of Chatuchak District, Bangkok, Thailand.

== Denomination ==
The name Chomphon (literally: "Field Marshal") after the name of the soi (alley) Chomphon or Soi Lat Phrao 15, off Lat Phrao Road in the early section that is situated in the area, not far from Lat Phrao Square. This alley used to be home to RS, one of Thailand's leading music labels and entertainment companies.

The area was declared a subdistrict in late 2003, along with four other subdistricts of Chatuchak.

== Geography ==
Chomphon is the southeast part of the district. Other areas that surround it include (from north clockwise): Chan Kasem in its district (Ratchadaphisek Road is a borderline), Din Daeng of Din Daeng (Khlong Bang Sue and Khlong Nam Kaew are the borderlines), Sam Sen Nai in Phaya Thai (Khlong Bang Sue is a borderline), Chatuchak in its district (Phaholyothin Road is a borderline), respectively.

== Places ==
The stretch of the Ratchadapisek Road in the area of Chomphon is lined with a large number of justice agencies. These include Criminal Court, Civil Court and Office of the Attorney General.

Other important places include Department of Land Transport, Saint John's University, TMBThanachart Bank (TTB), Channel 7 HD, Thairath Headquarters, BTS Group Holdings etc.
