= Phahonyothin Road =

Road in Thailand

Coordinates: 13.8474°N 100.5800°E

National Highway 1
- ทางหลวงแผ่นดินหมายเลข 1
- ถนนพหลโยธิน; Thanon Phahon Yothin
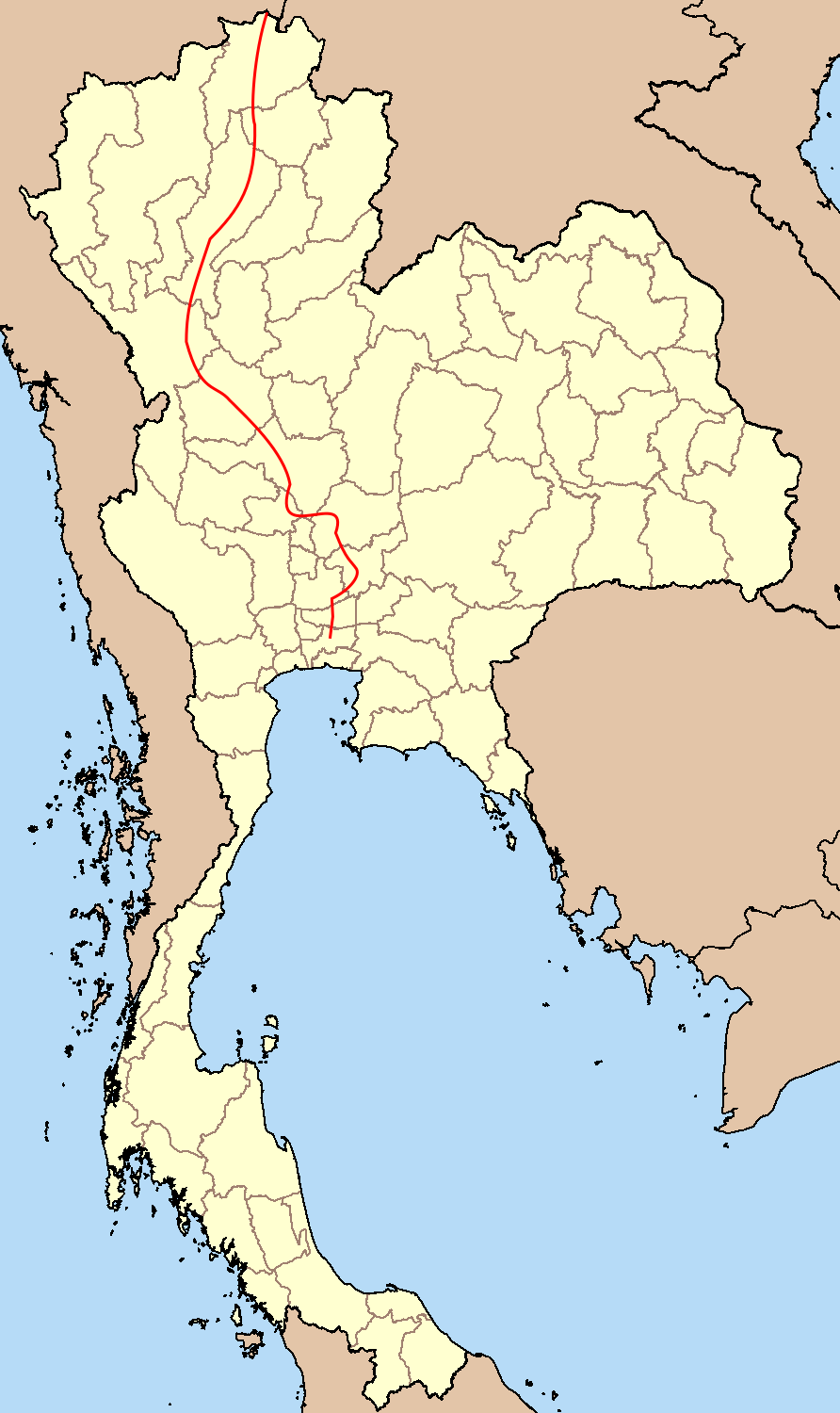

Route information
- Part of AH1 / AH2 / AH12
- Length: 1,005 km (624 mi)
- Existed: 1910–present

Major junctions
- South end: Bangkok, Victory Monument
- North end: Mae Sai district, Chiang Rai, border to Myanmar

Location
- Country: Thailand
- Provinces: Pathum Thani, Ayutthaya, Saraburi, Lopburi, Nakhon Sawan, Chainat, Kamphaeng Phet, Tak, Lampang, Phayao

Highway system
- Highways in Thailand; Motorways; Asian Highways

Phahonyothin Road (Thai: ถนนพหลโยธิน, RTGS: Thanon Phahon Yothin, pronounced [tʰā.nǒn pʰā.hǒn jōː.tʰīn]) or Highway 1 is a main road in Bangkok and one of the four primary highways in Thailand, which include Mittraphap Road (Highway 2), Sukhumvit Road (Highway 3), and Phet Kasem Road (Highway 4). It begins at Victory Monument in Bangkok and runs north to the Burmese border, with a total length of 1,005 km (624 mi).

== History ==
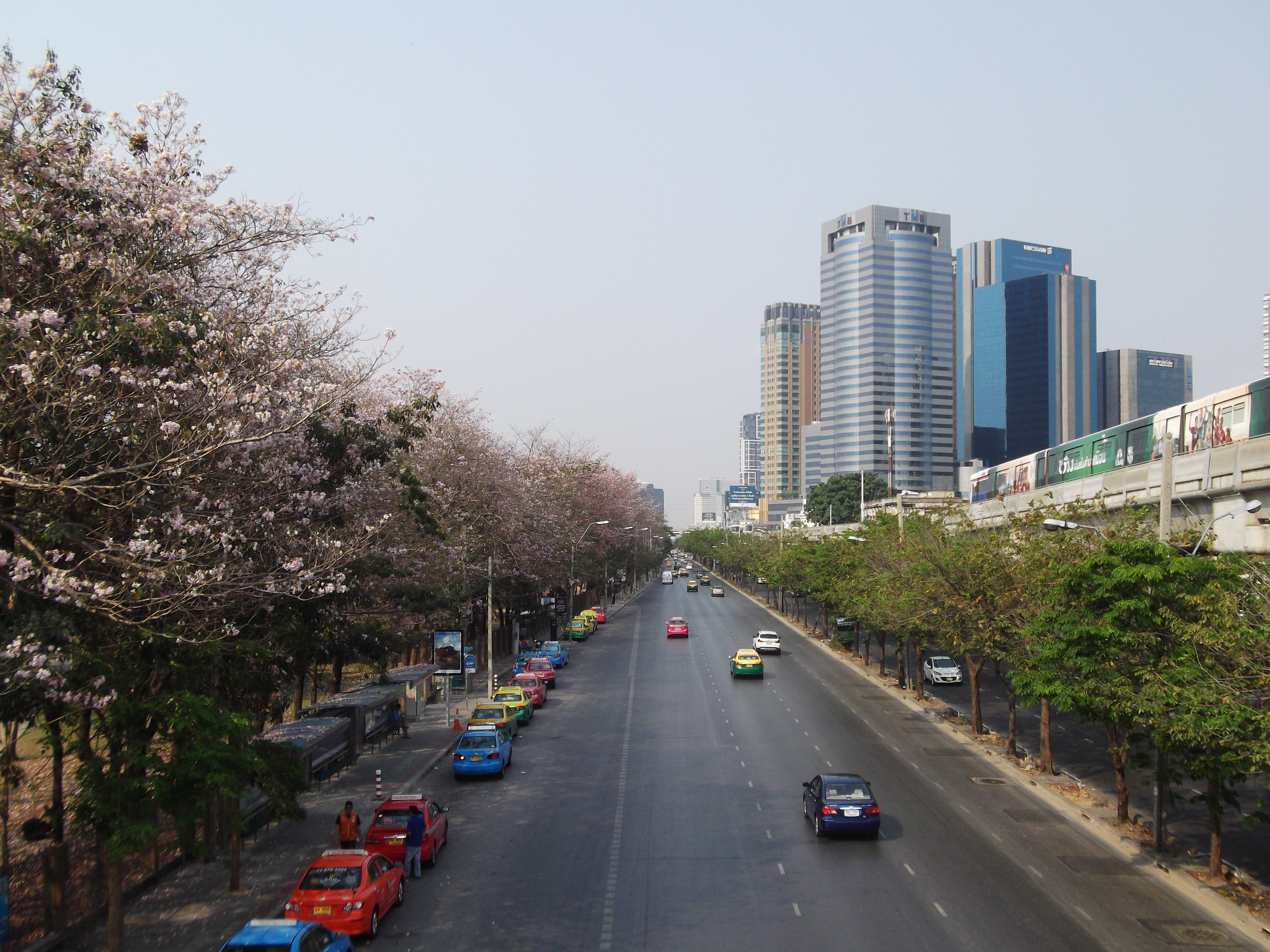
Phahonyothin Road passing Chatuchak Park view towards Lat Phrao Square

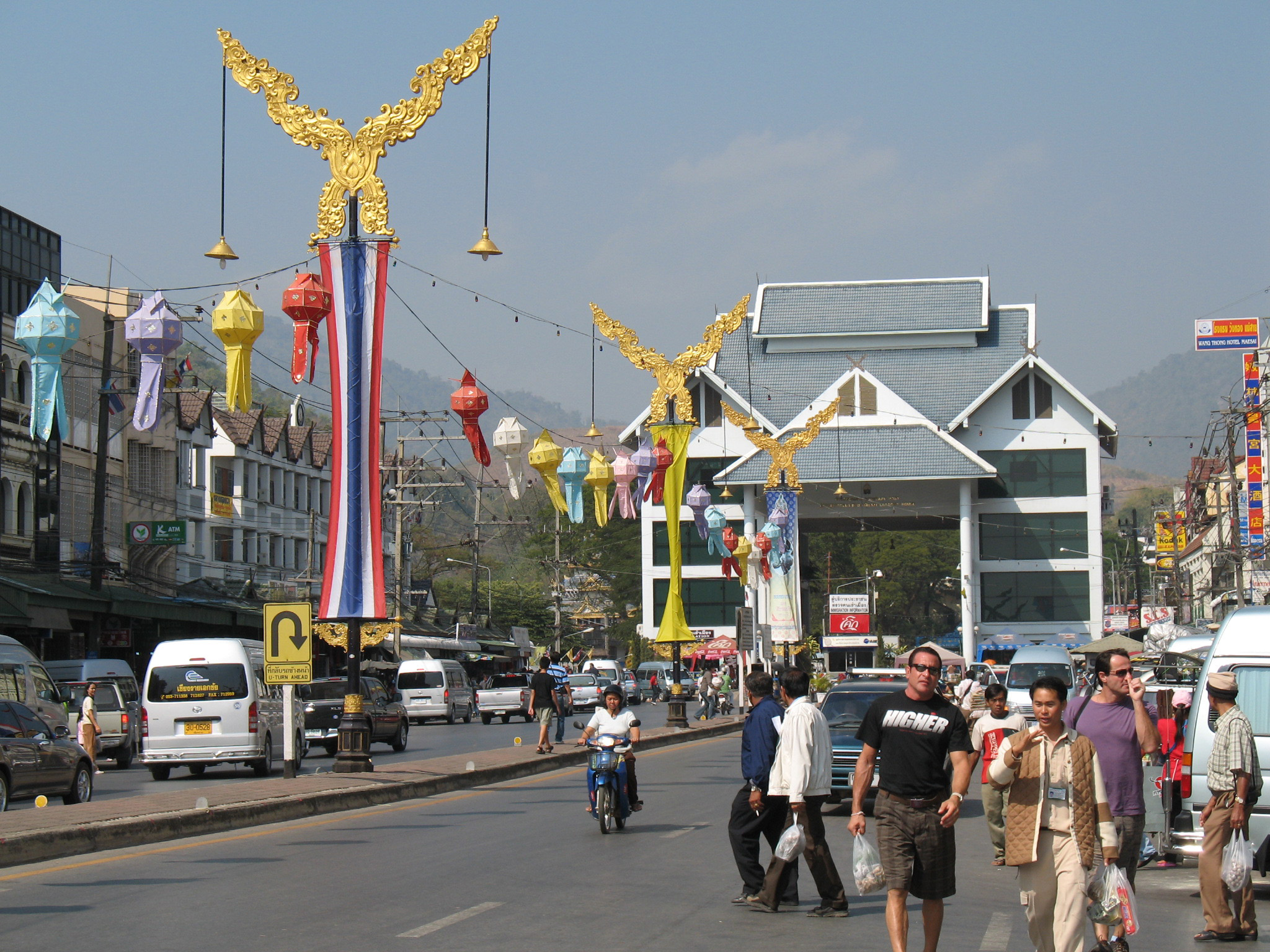
Mae Sai Pass

Following the Boworadet Rebellion in October 1933, the government of Phraya Phahonphonphayuhasena proposed the construction of a highway linking central Bangkok with Don Mueang Airfield to strengthen its control over the facility. Construction began in March 1934 and was completed in July of the same year. The road was originally named "Prachathipat Road" (Thai: ถนนประชาธิปัตย์, Thanon Prachathipat), spanning a distance of 22 km (14 mi).

In 1938, Prime Minister Plaek Phibunsongkhram ordered the extension of the road from Don Mueang through Bang Pa-in, Ayutthaya, Saraburi, Lopburi, and Sing Buri, bringing its total length to 162 km (101 mi). The extended road was renamed Phahonyothin Road in honor of Phraya Phahonphonphayuhasena (personal name Phot Phahonyothin), the second prime minister of Thailand and one of the leaders of the 1932 Siamese revolution.

== Route ==
In Bangkok, Phahonyothin Road originates at the northeast corner of Victory Monument on the periphery of Ratchathewi and Phaya Thai districts, then crosses Chatuchak, Bang Khen, Don Mueang, and Sai Mai districts before continuing into Pathum Thani Province, and on through Ayutthaya, Saraburi, Lopburi, Nakhon Sawan, Chainat, again through Nakhon Sawan, Kamphaeng Phet, Tak, Lampang, Phayao and finally Chiang Rai, ending in Mae Sai district, where it connects to Tachileik in Myanmar.

Phaholyothin Road in Bangkok is also a demarcation line between districts or sub-districts in several phases as follows:

1. Thung Phaya Thai (outbound) and Thanon Phaya Thai (inbound) in Ratchathewi district, as a continuation of Phaya Thai Road, from Victory Monument to the bridge over the Khlong Samsen.
2. Phaya Thai (outbound) and Samsen Nai (inbound) in Phaya Thai district throughout the entire area, from the bridge over the Khlong Samsen to the bridge over the Khlong Bang Sue (begins July 26, 2017).
3. Chatuchak (outbound) and Chom Phon (inbound) in Chatuchak district from the bridge over the Khlong Bang Sue to Ratchayothin Intersection.
4. Lat Yao (outbound) and Chan Kasem (inbound) in Chatuchak district from Ratchayothin to Sena Nikhom Intersections.
5. Lat Yao (outbound) and Sena Nikhom (inbound) in Chatuchak district from Sena Nikhom Junction to Thong Chanya Bridge.
6. Bang Khen district (outbound) and Sai Mai district (inbound) from the bridge over the Khlong Lam Phak Chi to Saphan Mai quarter.
7. Don Mueang district (outbound) and Sai Mai district (inbound) from Saphan Mai quarter to the administrative boundary line between Bangkok and Pathum Thani.

== See also ==
- Thai highway network
- Kunming-Bangkok Expressway
- Bangkok/Phahonyothin travel guide from Wikivoyage
