= Chatuchak district =

Chatuchak จตุจักร
- Khet
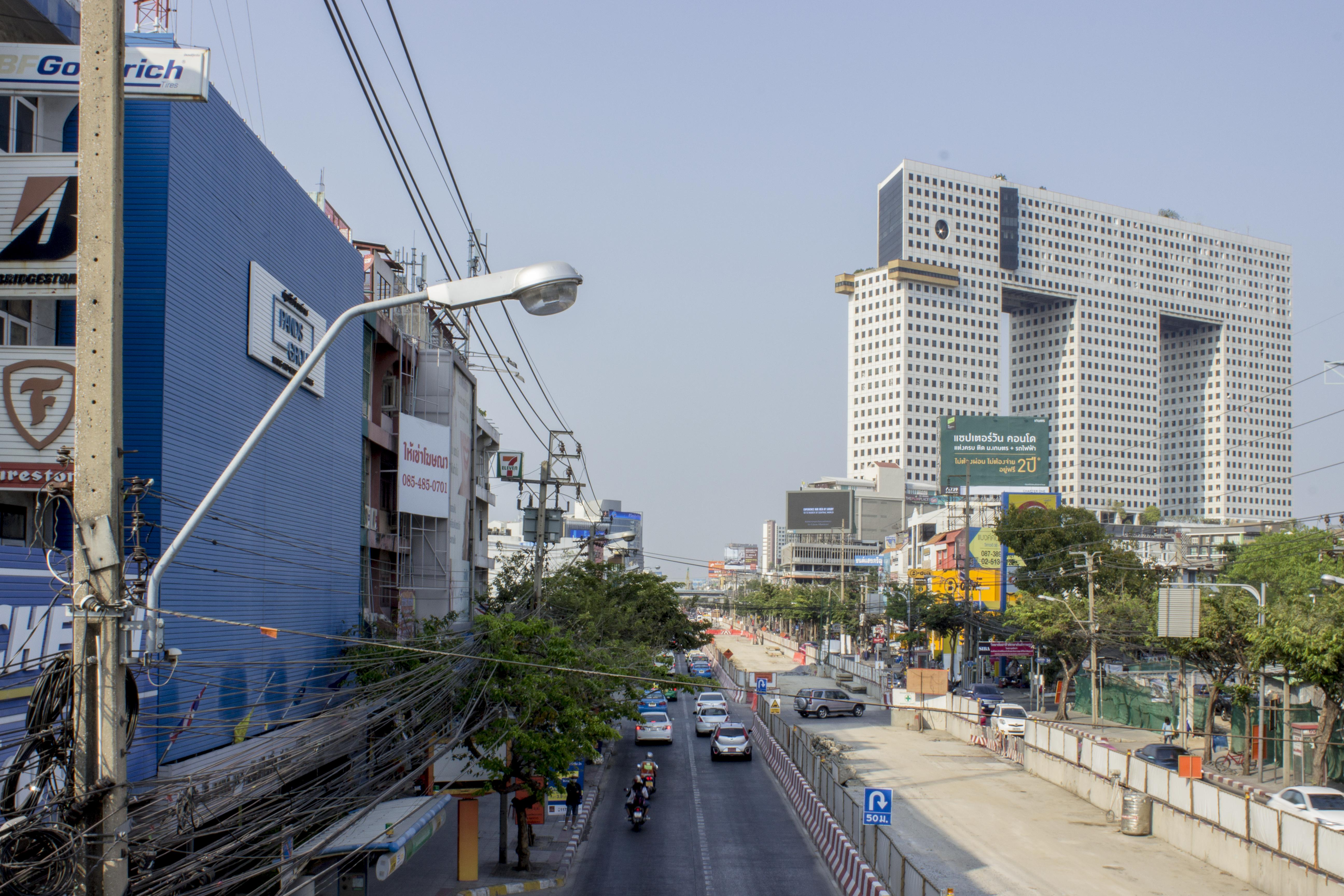
- Phahonyothin Road, running through Chatuchak, with Elephant Tower on the right

- Khet location in Bangkok
- Coordinates: 13°49′43″N 100°33′35″E
- Country: Thailand
- Province: Bangkok
- Seat: Chatuchak
- Khwaeng: 5
- Khet established: 1989

Area
  - Total: 32.908 km^{2} (12.706 sq mi)

Population (2017)
  - Total: 156,684
  - Density: 4,761.27/km^{2} (12,331.6/sq mi)
- Time zone: UTC+7 (ICT)
- Postal code: 10900
- Geocode: 1030

Chatuchak (Thai: จตุจักร, pronounced [t͡ɕàʔ.tùʔ.t͡ɕàk]) is one of the 50 districts (khet) of Bangkok, Thailand. The district is bounded by seven other districts (from the north clockwise): Lak Si, Bang Khen, Lat Phrao, Huai Khwang, Din Daeng, Phaya Thai, and Bang Sue.

== History ==
Chatuchak was originally part of Bang Khen district. It became a separate district in 1989. The name of the district came from its two major landmarks, Chatuchak Park and Chatuchak Weekend Market.

== Government and infrastructure ==
The district is divided into five sub-districts (khwaeng).

No.	Name	Thai	Area (km^{2})	Map
1.	Lat Yao	ลาดยาว	10.690	Map
2.	Sena Nikhom	เสนานิคม	2.826	Map
3.	Chan Kasem	จันทรเกษม	6.026	Map
4.	Chomphon	จอมพล	5.488	Map
5.	Chatuchak	จตุจักร	7.878	Map
Total			32.908	Map

The Department of National Parks, Wildlife and Plant Conservation, Royal Forest Department and Department of Fisheries with Criminal Court of Thailand as well as Department of Land Transport have their headquarters in the district. Central Juvenile and Family Court is located on Kamphaeng Phet Road near Bang Sue Grand Station. Klong Prem Central Prison, also known as "Lat Yao Prison", is in the district.

== Markets ==
The best-known site in the district is the Chatuchak Weekend Market, the largest market in Thailand. Northwest of the weekend market is another market, Chatuchak Plaza, which sells clothes and many other products. Across Kamphang Phet Road is Or Tor Kor Market (ตลาด อ.ต.ก.) belonging to The Marketing Organization for Farmers (องค์การตลาดเพื่อการเกษตร), offering fresh agricultural products and food. Just north of the market along Kamphang Phet Road is an area selling plants and garden products.

== Parks ==
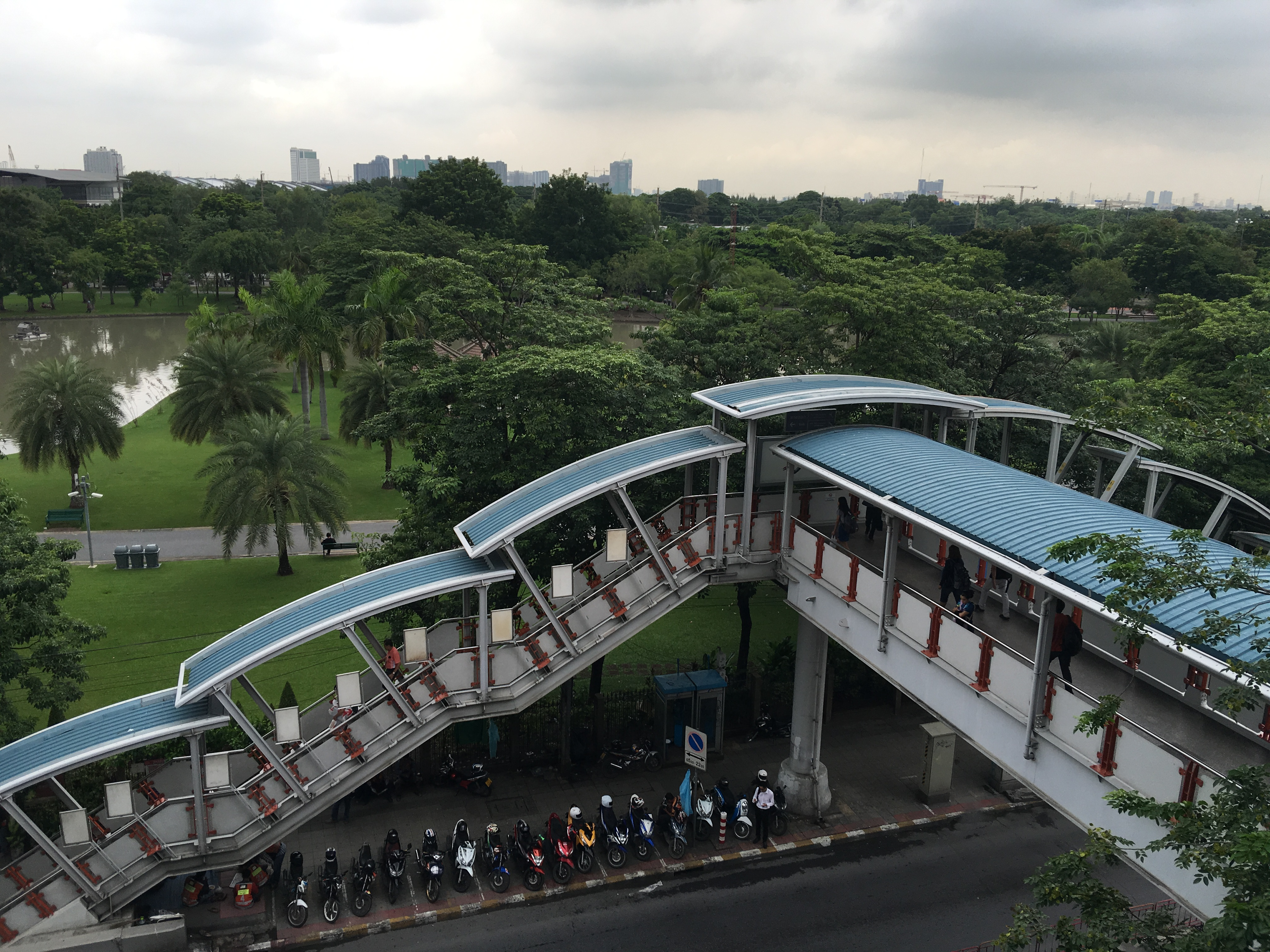
Chatuchak Park seen from Mo Chit BTS Station

Adjoining the Chatuchak Weekend Market to the north is the Chatuchak Park complex, covering 1.20 km^{2} of a former State Railway of Thailand golf course consisting of Chatuchak Park (สวนจตุจักร), Queen Sirikit Park (สวนสมเด็จพระนางเจ้าสิริกิติ์ฯ), Wachirabenchathat Park (สวนวชิรเบญจทัศ), and Chak Phupha Su Maha Nathee Park (สวนจากภูผาสู่มหานที), the newest addition to the area.

Chatuchak Park (0.304 km^{2}) is the first park in the complex. It opened in December 1980 and is on Phahonyothin Road next to the Mo Chit BTS Station. It is the most accessible park of the three. Also included in this park is the Train Museum.

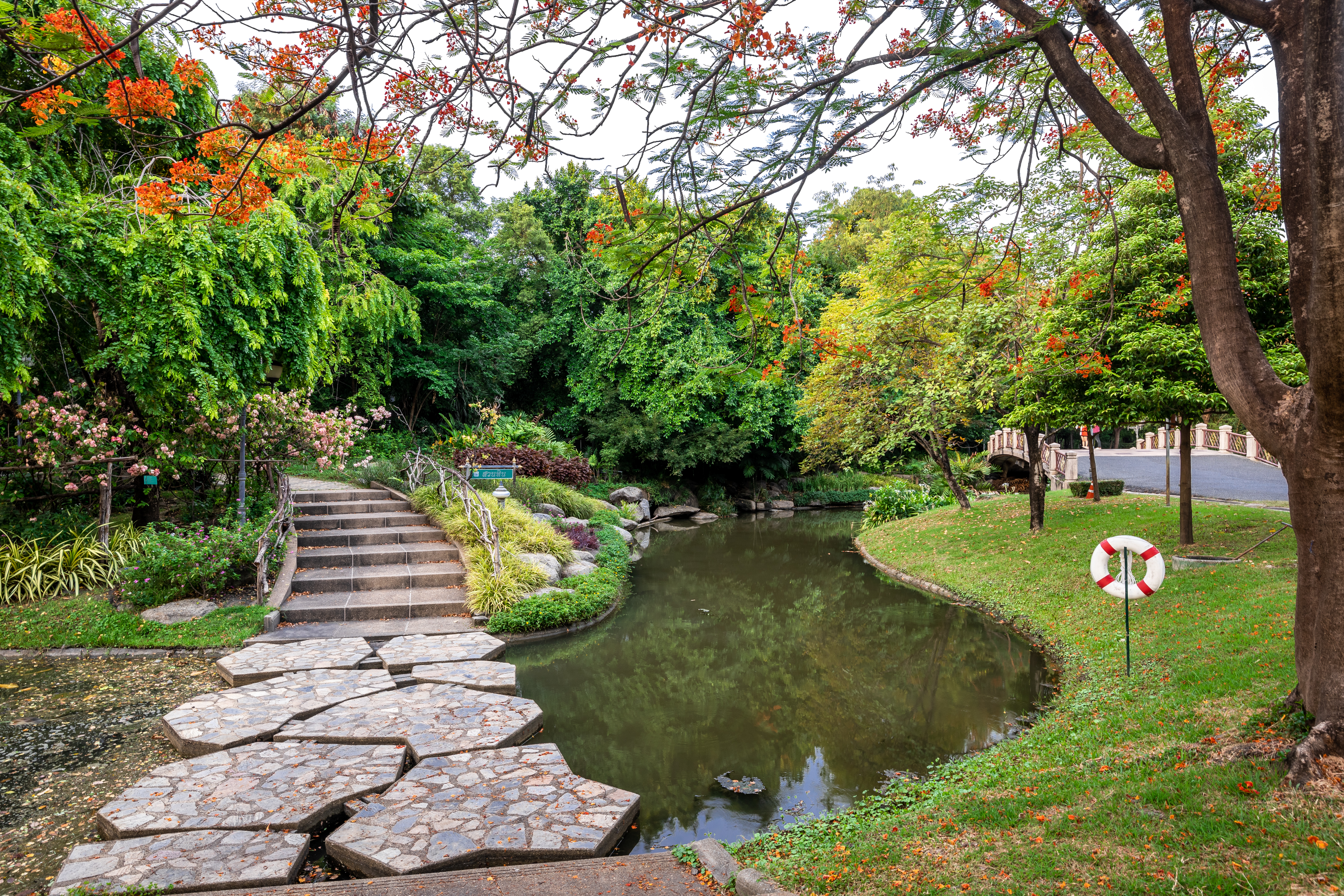
Queen Sirikit Park

Queen Sirikit Park (0.224 km^{2}) is a botanical garden built to honor the queen's 60th birthday in 1992. It was formally opened in December 1996. Plants collected in the garden include hibiscus, plumeria, and palms. Within the park compound is the Children's Museum. The park is behind the Chatuchak Weekend Market parking lot.

The Wachirabenchathat Park (0.600 km^{2}) is the biggest park of the complex. It was called State Railway Public Park (สวนรถไฟ, Suan Rot Fai) but was renamed in July 2002 in honor of Prince Maha Vajiralongkorn's 50th birthday. It contains a butterfly park and the tallest fountain in Thailand.

Chak Phupha Su Maha Nathee Park (0.040 km^{2}), is the newest and smallest park within the Chatuchak Park complex. It was officially opened in early 2025 and serves as a continuation of adjacent Queen Sirikit Park. The park's design and layout are inspired by the royal initiative of Queen Sirikit, The Queen Mother, focusing on forest conservation. It is intended as a learning centre to educate visitors about sustainable living and the vital relationship between people and forests.

== Locations ==
The Elephant Tower (Thai: ตึกช้าง) is one of the most distinctive buildings in Bangkok. Shaped like an elephant, it consists of three towers, A, B, and C, joined at the top; it includes condominiums and office space.

On Vibhavadi Road, opposite Kasetsart University, is the Museum of Contemporary Art (MOCA). One of the main artists featured is Thawan Duchanee (ถวัลย์ ดัชนี, also spelled Tawan Datchanee), a late artist who is still regarded as one of Thailand's most renowned modern artists.

Central Ladprao is the largest shopping center in the district; it contains Central Department Store, Bangkok Convention Centre, the first convention hall in Thailand, cinemas, and many retail shops. Other shopping centers in Chatuchak District include Major Cineplex Ratchayothin, featuring a 14-screen multiplex cinema; and Union Mall, an eight-storey shopping mall popular with young shoppers. Mixt Chatuchak and JJ Mall are two shopping malls located near Chatuchak Weekend Market; opposite JJ Mall is Bangsue Junction (affectionately known as Tuek Daeng; "the red building"), a shopping mall known for home decorations and antiques.

The Bangkok Mass Transit System (BTSC), the operator of the BTS Skytrain, has its headquarters in the district on Phahonyothin Road, opposite Chatuchak Park.

Channel 7, Thai Rath, and Matichon, three of Thailand's leading mass media organizations, also have their headquarters in this district.

Wat Samian Nari and Wat Thewasunthorn are the only two Buddhist temples located in Chatuchak.

RS, one of Thailand's leading entertainment companies, is also headquartered in the district.

The renowned amusement park Dan Neramit, also known as Magic Land, was located on Phahonyothin Road near Central Ladprao from 1976 to 2010; it has since been turned into a go-kart racing track.

== Education ==
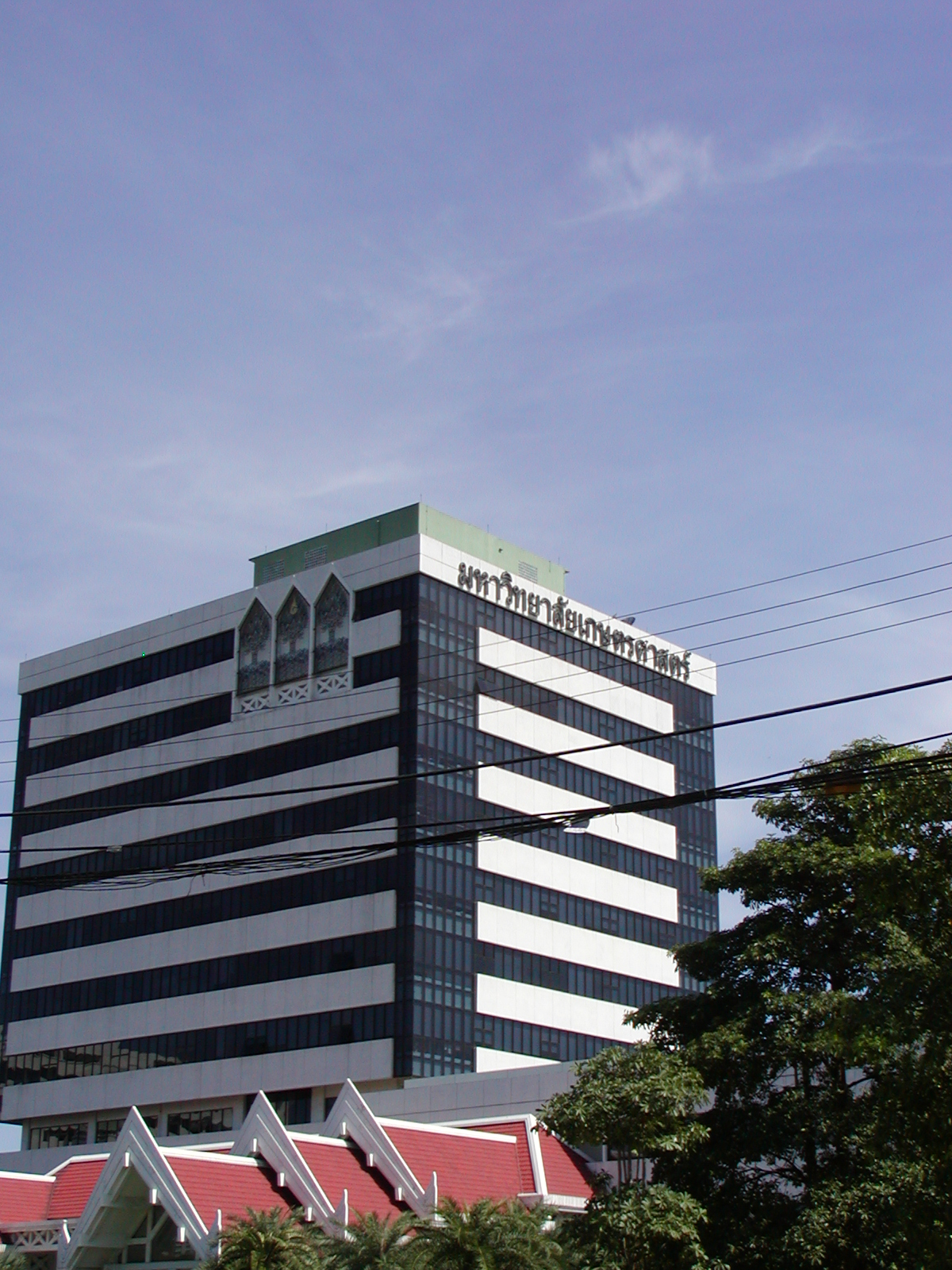
The Kasetsart University administration building

Kasetsart University is one of the top universities in Thailand. Originally focused on agricultural sciences, it now includes many fields including business and engineering. The university is on a large block bounded by Vibhavadi Rangsit Road, Ngamwongwan Road and Phahonyothin Road.

Sripatum University is a private university adjacent to 11th Royal Infantry Regiment.

Saint John's University and Saint John's International School are also in Chatuchak District.

Chandrakasem Rajabhat University is one of Thailand’s Rajabhat Universities, located on Ratchadaphisek Road near the Criminal Court of Thailand.

== Transport ==
Five metro lines run through the district: the MRT Blue Line, BTS Sukhumvit Line, SRT Dark Red Line, SRT Light Red Line, and MRT Yellow Line.

The MRT Blue Line crosses the district with four stations: Kamphaeng Phet, Chatuchak Park, Phahon Yothin, and Lat Phrao; Bang Sue MRT Station sits at the boundary between Chatuchak and Bang Sue districts.

The BTS Sukhumvit Line serves the district with the following stations: Mo Chit, Ha Yaek Lat Phrao station, Phahon Yothin 24, Ratchayothin, Sena Nikhom, Kasetsart University, Royal Forest Department and Bang Bua.

The SRT Dark Red Line also passes through the area with four stations: Bang Sue (Krung Thep Aphiwat), Chatuchak, Wat Samian Nari and Bang Khen.

Chatuchak district marks the northern terminus of the MRT Yellow Line, with its final stop at Lat Phrao MRT Station.

The area is served by Bang Sue Junction railway station under the State Railway of Thailand (SRT), where the Southern, Northern, and Northeastern Lines pass through.

Krung Thep Aphiwat Central Terminal, located just behind Chatuchak Weekend Market, officially replaced Bang Sue 1 railway station after its completion on November 29, 2021. It now functions as Thailand’s main railway hub, replacing Bangkok railway station (Hua Lamphong).

The Northern Bus Terminal (commonly called "Mo Chit Mai" or "Mo Chit II", หมอชิตใหม่ or หมอชิต 2) is also located in this district, providing bus services to the northern and northeastern provinces.

Lat Phrao Intersection, also known as Lat Phrao Square, is one of the most important junctions in both the district and Bangkok. It connects five routes: Phahonyothin Road, Vibhavadi Rangsit Road, Lat Phrao Road, and Don Mueang Tollway; and is considered the starting point of Lat Phrao Road.

== District council ==
The district council for Chatuchak has eight members, who serve four-year terms. Elections were last held on 30 April 2006. The results were:

- Thai Rak Thai Party, eight seats.

== Economy ==
Thai Airways International and Bangkok Airways have their head offices in Chatuchak.

TMBThanachart Bank and Siam Commercial Bank (SCB) with Bank for Agriculture and Agricultural Co-operatives (BAAC) have their head offices in the district as well. The head office building of SCB is known as SCB Park Plaza.

== Organisations ==
The International Civil Aviation Organization (ICAO) has its Asia and Pacific (APAC) Office in Chatuchak district.

== Gallery ==
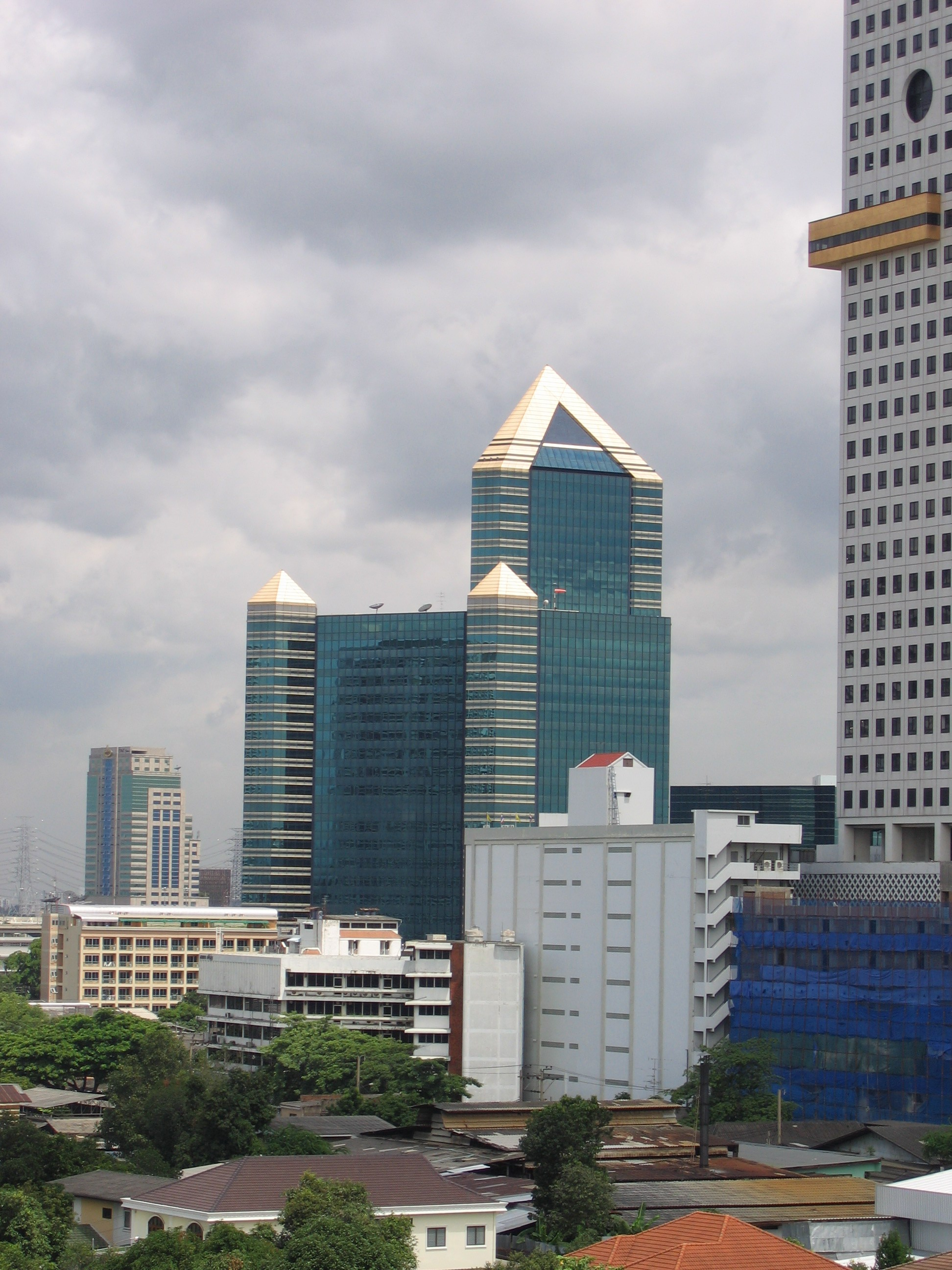
SCB Park Plaza

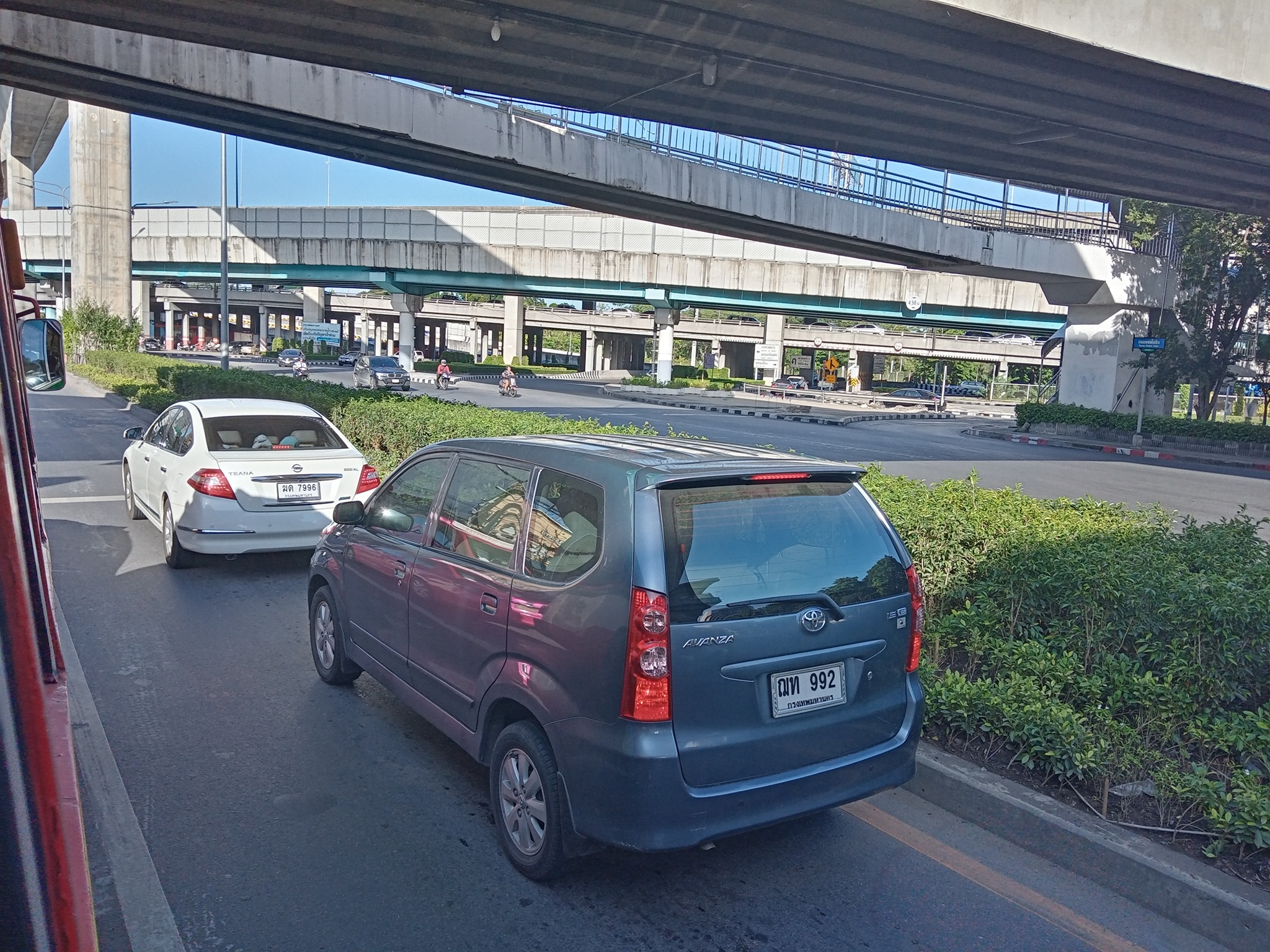
Lat Phrao Intersection as seen from Lat Phrao Road level toward TTB Bank head office

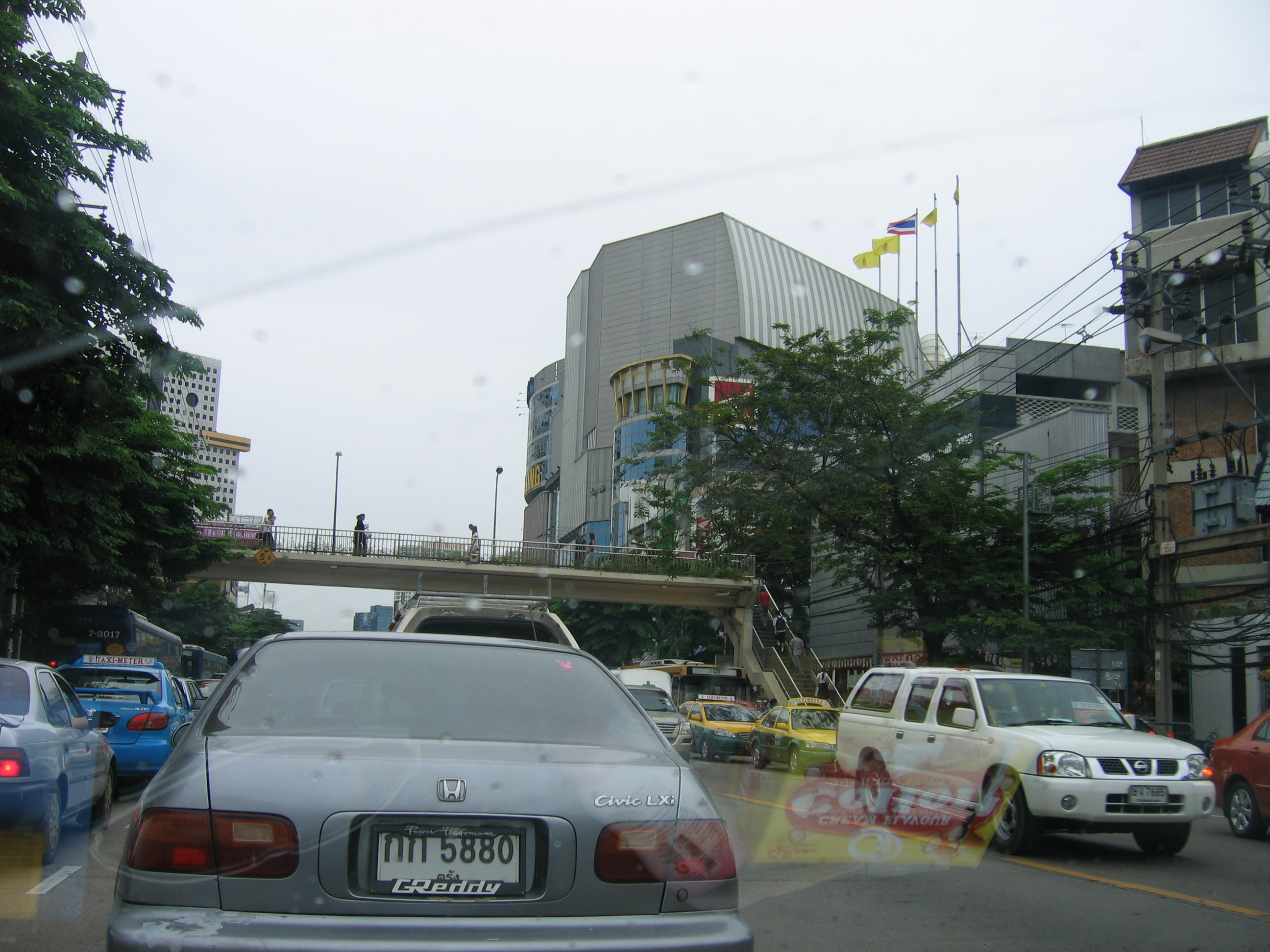
Major Cineplex Ratchayothin a leading cinema in the district

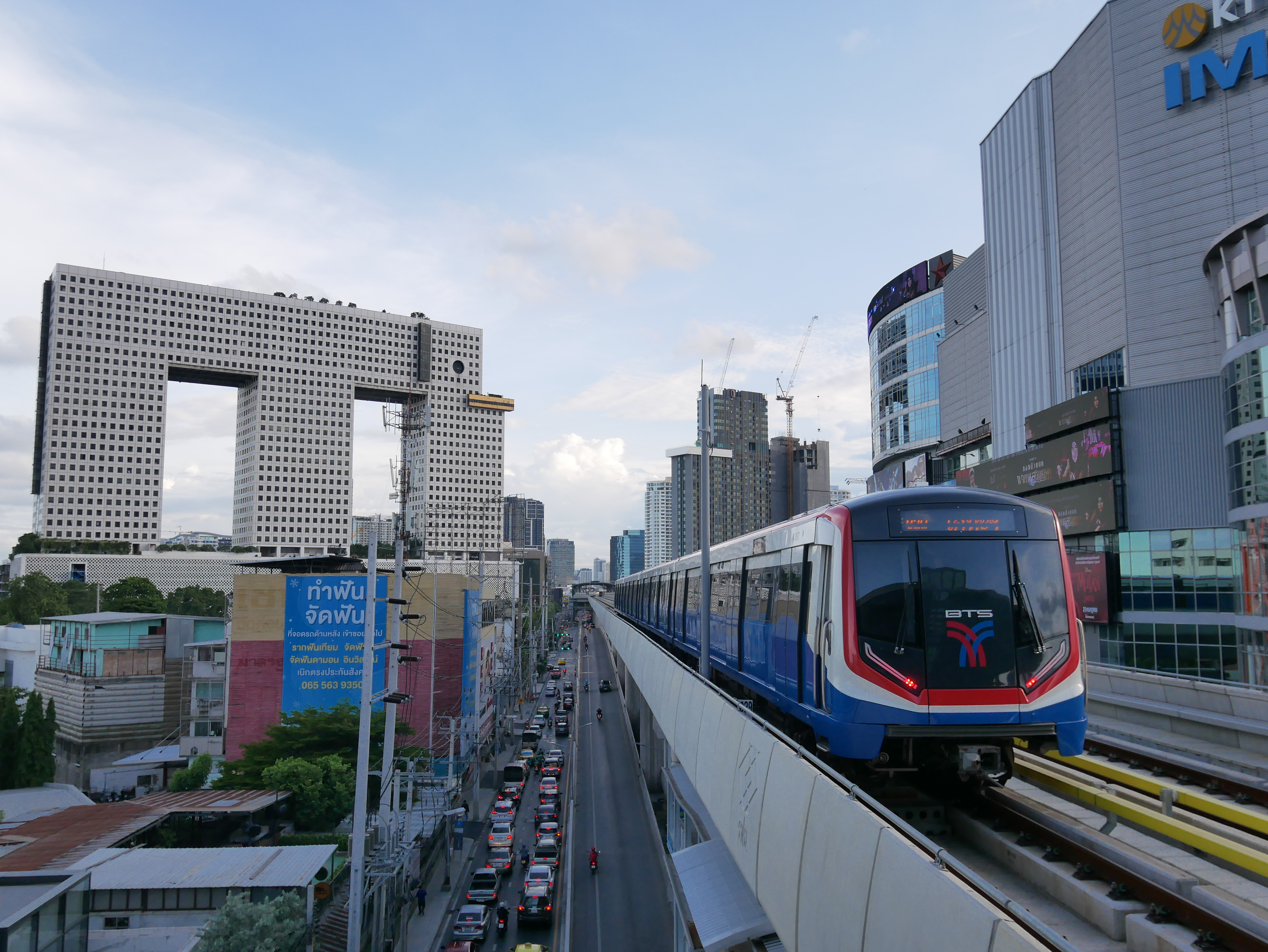
Elephant Tower and BTS Skytrain

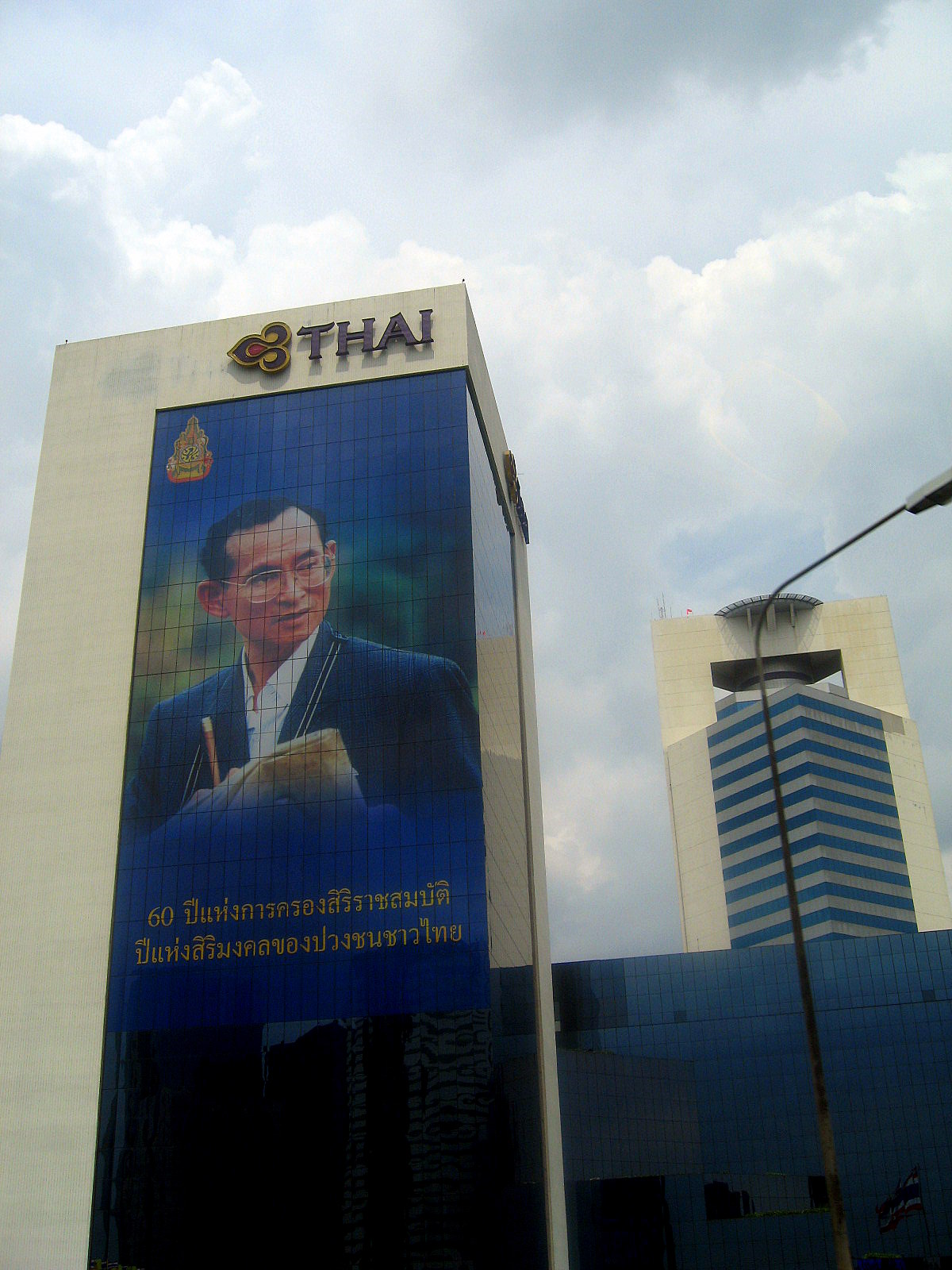
Thai Airways headquarters

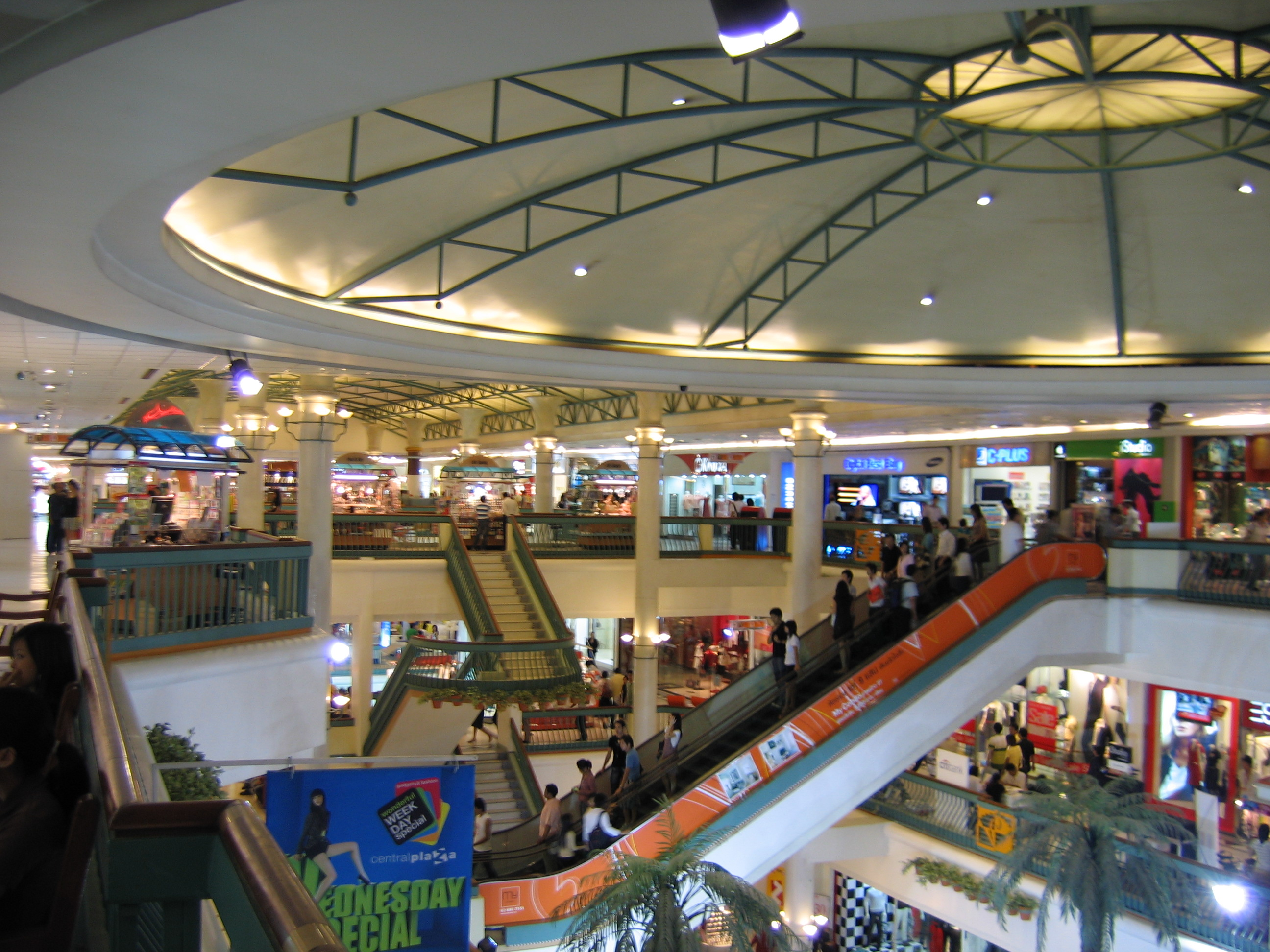
Inside of Central Ladprao

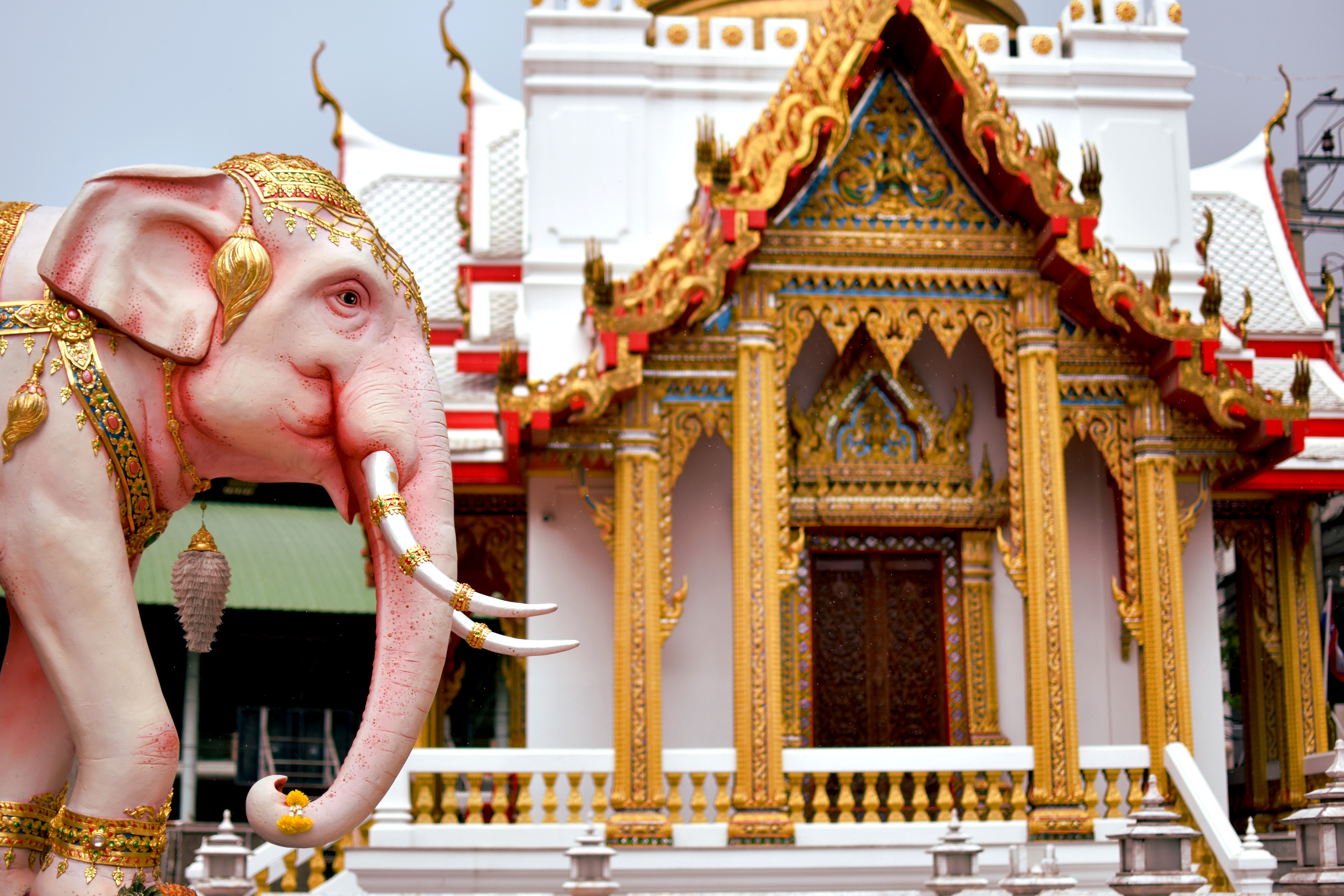
Wat Samian Nari one of two Thai temples in the district

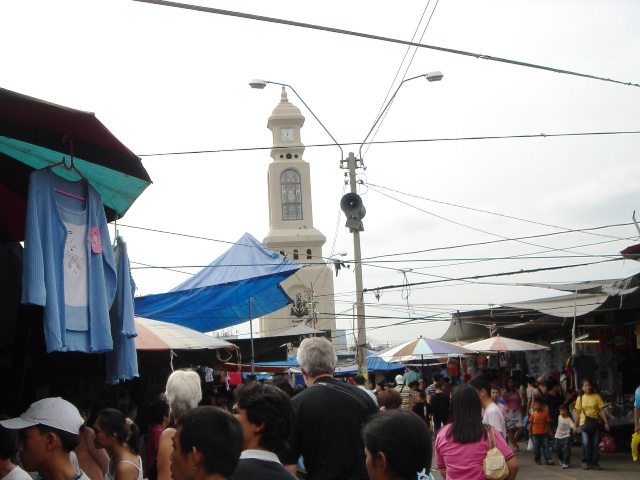
Chatuchak Weekend Market and its clock tower, the landmark

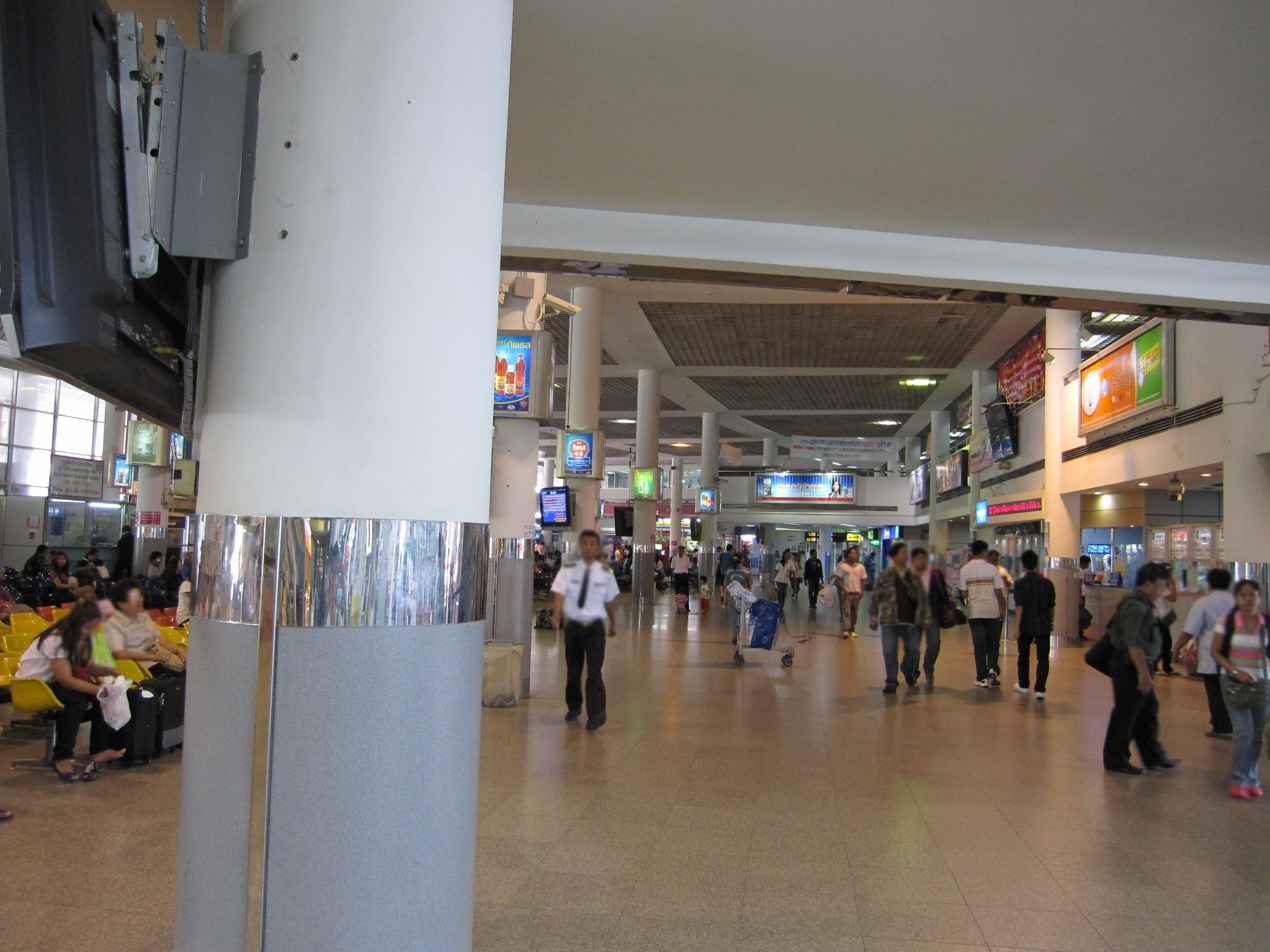
Inside of Northern Bus Terminal or better known as Mo Chit 2

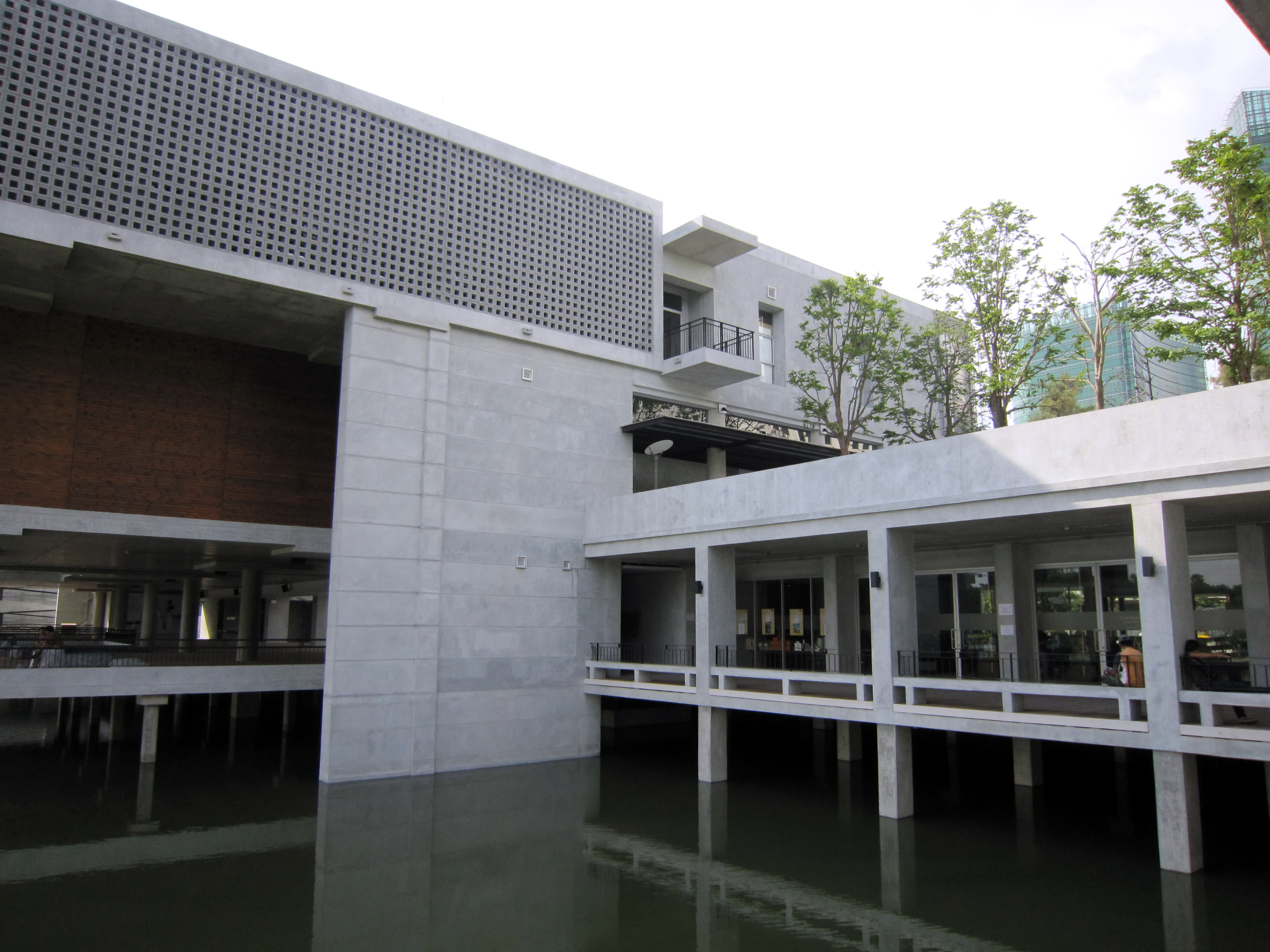
Buddhadasa Indapanno Archives (BIA) also known as Suan Mokkh Bangkok within Wachirabenchathat Park
