= Horwang School =

Coordinates: 13.818661°N 100.561018°E

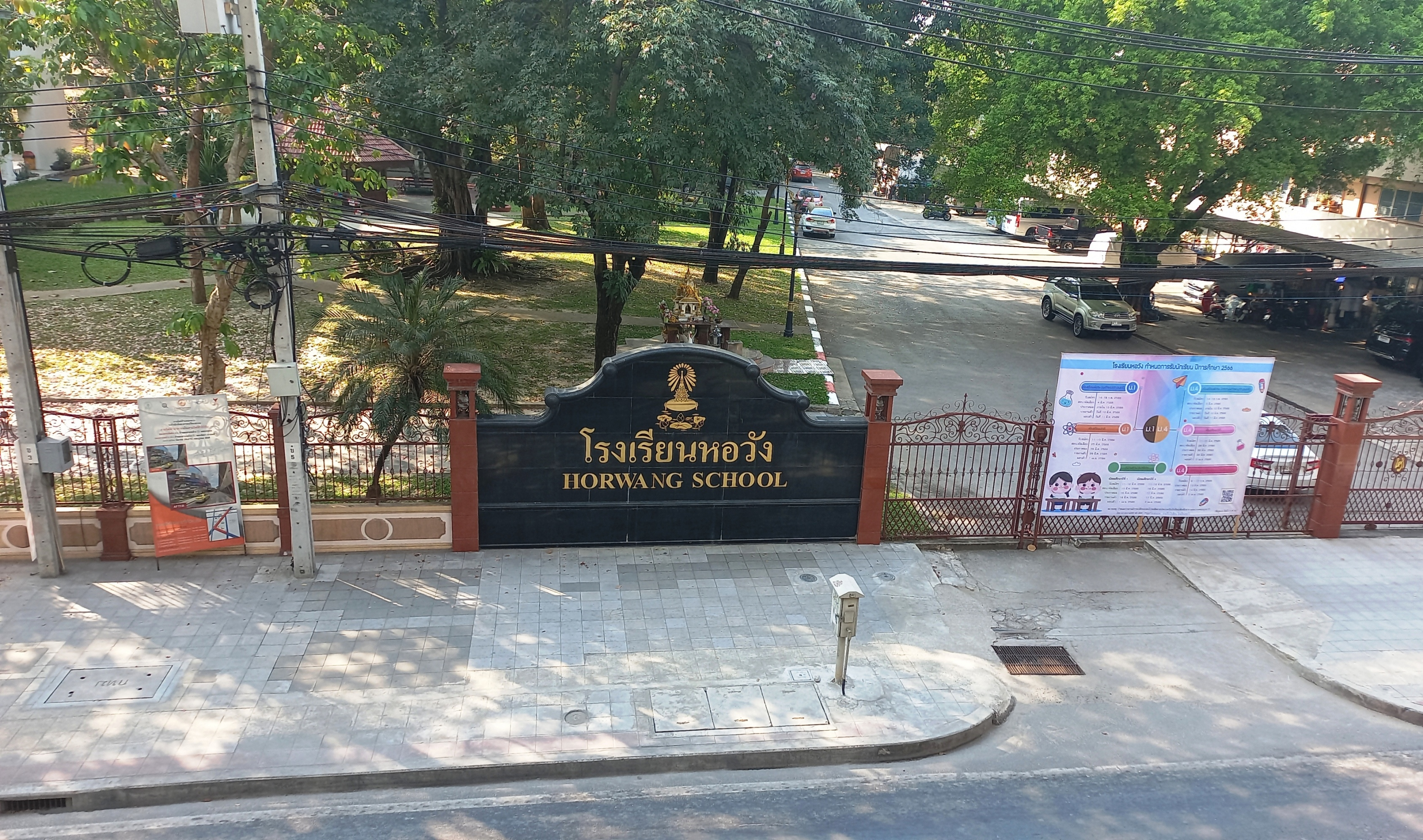

Location
- 16/9 Ladyao, Chatuchak; Bangkok, 10900; Thailand

Information
- Type: Government
- Established: January 9, 1966
- Authority: Office of the Basic Education Commission
- Head teacher: Dr. Manas Wiangwiset
- Grades: 7–12 (mathayom 1–6)
- Gender: Coeducational
- Campus type: Urban
- Colour: Brown-Yellow
- Slogan: he who listens will bring wisdoms
- Song: march horwang
- Sports: Tennis; Badminton; Futsal; Basketball; Volleyball
- Website: http://www.horwang.ac.th

Horwang School (Thai: โรงเรียนหอวัง) is a state school located in Bangkok, Thailand.

== History ==
After King Rama V appointed the Crown Prince to replace the role of the Na Palace, he appointed His Royal Highness Crown Prince Prince Maha Vajirunhis. His Majesty was pleased to build a palace in Pathumwan field called "Windsor Palace", commonly known as "Phra Tamnak Hor Wang" because it is a building with a high tower.

After Vajirunhis died unexpectedly due to typhoid fever at the age of 16, the palace was converted from a residence to a school for the Civil Service of His Majesty King Chulalongkorn Has, who enshrined the school as Chulalongkorn University on March 26, 1916. In 1935, the Department of Physical Education entered into a land lease agreement in Wang Mai Subdistrict, and demolishing the university building to build a national stadium called Horwang Secondary School of Chulalongkorn University.

Until 1938, Chulalongkorn University was temporarily moved to a new school building on Phayathai Road. After dissolving Horwang Secondary School, Triam Udom Suksa School was established to be consistent with the national education plan. In 1966, alumni from Horwang Secondary School of Chulalongkorn University came together to establish a High School Alumni Association for Chulalongkorn University and decided at a meeting of the board of directors that the school should be restored to be a gathering place for former students. This school was referred to as Bangkhen Wittaya School until the Ministry of Education was established on January 9, 1996. On January 31, 1968, the Ministry of Education announced that Bangkhen Witthaya School would be renamed to Horwang School effective from November 27, 1967.

Horwang School has passed the third round of educational assessment from the Office of the Basic Education Commission. Upon accreditation in 2011, the assessment of educational quality was found to be 1 in 8 for special quality schools in Bangkok and 1 in 16 for special quality schools in Thailand.

== List of administrators ==
Horwang School Administrator's Office
Administrator	Timespan
1. Mr. Dusit Poonpon	1966–1978
2. Mr. Charoen Wongphan	1978–1980
3. Mrs. Laorsi Chumworachat	1980–1989
4. Mr. Sompong Thampraew	1989–1997
5. Mr. Narong Rakdej	1997–1999
6. Mr. Montree Saenwises	1999–2002
7. Mrs. Phitsawat Yutdamrong	2002–2006
8. Miss Sukanya Santi Phatthanachai	2006–2007
9. Mr. Plongyuth Inthaphan	2007–2011
10. Dr.Pacharapong Treethepha	2011–2012
11. Dr. Thongchart Wongsawan	2012–2013
12. Dr. Sawat Phetchabun	2013–2018
13. Dr. Lertsil Rattanamusik	2018–2019
14. Mr. Thammarong Senjan	2019–2020
15. Dr. Prawat Suthiprapha	2020-2024
16. Dr. Manas Wiangwiset	2024-present
