= Hall of Railway Heritage =

Museum in Bangkok, Thailand

Coordinates: 13.811056°N 100.556938°E

Hall of Railway Heritage (Thai: หอเกียรติภูมิรถไฟ) used to be a museum in Bangkok, Thailand, which is now defunct. It was a museum dedicated to trains and the railway. It was located on the western side of Chatuchak Park adjacent to Kamphaeng Phet Road. Steam engines, train models and miniature trains were exhibited along with the story of world railway systems.

== History ==
There was a large exhibition hall containing relics and was run by the Thai Railfan Club. There were numerous steam engines, and model and miniature trains on display. In the 1970s the building had been designated as a train museum but the official opening occurred much later, in 1990. The railway enthusiasts collated historic rolling stock and restored it before putting it on display. Due to dropping visitor numbers the museum was permanently closed on 23 October 2012.

== Exhibits ==
Several types of wagons, two small steam locomotives by Kyosan Kogyo from 1949 and 1959 and two diesel locomotives were shown, as well as a library train. One of the highlights was a hospital train, for which King Rama V had ordered some gold teak wood from Brazil, then got the train manufactured and assembled in England, and finally transported by ship to Bangkok via Malaya. The train was meant to provide medical services to remote towns and provinces. Also on display was the first train peg in Thailand, which was found during the excavations fot Hua Lumpong underground station.

The Japanese Kyosan Kogyo 0-4-0T narrow gauge steam locomotive N°10089 is claimed to be 'the last stream locomotive ever built that has never been used.' It had been ordered for hauling sugar cane from the plantations to a sugar mill. It was probably the last locomotive built by the Japanese company Kyosan Kogyo, before it closed down. The locomotive was in an excellent condition as it has probably never been used. It is now in operation at the Thong Somboon Club resort.
