= Chatuchak =

Chatuchak (or Jatujak) may refer to:

- Chatuchak Weekend Market, Bangkok, Thailand
- Chatuchak Park, a public park just north of Chatuchak Weekend Market
- Chatuchak Park MRT station, a Bangkok MRT station next to the park
- Chatuchak District, a Bangkok district (khet) named after the park and the market
- Chatuchak, a subdistrict (khwaeng) within Chatuchak District
