= Kamphaeng Phet (disambiguation) =

Kamphaeng Phet may refer to these in Thailand:

- Kamphaeng Phet, town in central Thailand
- Kamphaeng Phet, Rattaphum a tambon in Rattaphum District, Songkhla Province, Thailand
- Kamphaeng Phet Province
- Amphoe Mueang Kamphaeng Phet
- Kamphaeng Phet Historical Park
- Kamphaeng Phet Road, Bangkok
- Kamphaeng Phet metro station, Bangkok
- Prince Purachatra Jayakara, Prince of Kamphaeng Phet (1882-1936)
