= Krung Thep Aphiwat Central Terminal =

Central station of Bangkok, Thailand

Krung Thep Aphiwat Central Terminal สถานีกลางกรุงเทพอภิวัฒน์
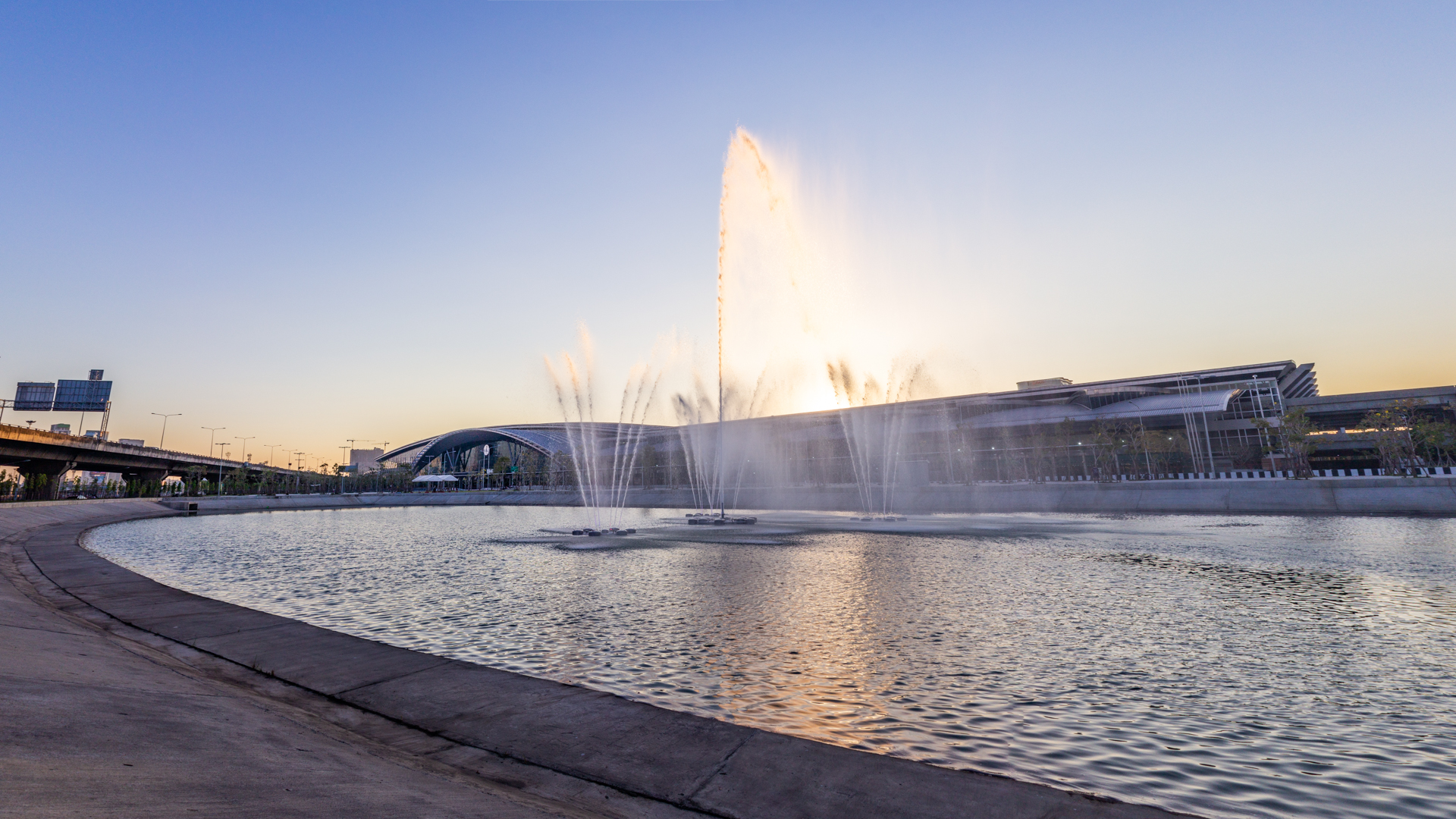
- Krung Thep Aphiwat Central Terminal in 2021

General information
- Location: 336 Thoet Damri Road, Chatuchak; Bangkok; Thailand
- Coordinates: 13°48′18″N 100°32′30″E
- Owner: State Railway of Thailand (SRT)
- Operator: State Railway of Thailand (ground); Mass Rapid Transit Authority (underground)
- Manager: Ministry of Transport
- Platforms: 26
- Tracks: 38
- Connections: BMTA

Construction
- Structure type: Surface building
- Parking: Yes
- Accessible: Yes

Other information
- Status: Terminal station for all long distance trains except the Eastern
- Station code: KTW; กภ. (Inter-city); RN01, RS01 (Dark Red Line); RW01, RE01 (Light Red Line); A9, HE02 (AERA1); BL11 (Blue Line)
- Classification: Class 1

History
- Opened: 2 August 2021; 5 years ago (SRT Red Lines); 19 January 2023; 3 years ago (SRT Inter-city)
- Electrified: 25 kV 50 Hz AC overhead catenary
- Former names: Bang Sue Grand Station (สถานีกลางบางซื่อ)

Services
Preceding station	SRT Red Lines	Following station
Terminus	Light Red Line	Bang Son towards Taling Chan
Terminus	Dark Red Line	Chatuchak towards Rangsit
Preceding station	State Railway of Thailand	Following station
Terminus	Northern Line	Don Mueang towards Chiang Mai
Terminus	Northeastern Line	Don Mueang towards Ubon Ratchathani or Khamsavath (Laos)
Terminus	Southern Line	Bang Bamru towards Su-ngai Kolok
Preceding station	Metropolitan Rapid Transit	Following station
Kamphaeng Phet towards Lak Song	Blue Line transfer at Bang Sue	Tao Poon towards Tha Phra
Future development
Preceding station	State Railway of Thailand	Following station
Terminus	Northeastern HSR	Don Mueang towards Nakhon Ratchasima
Proposed
Preceding station	Airport Rail Link	Following station
Don Mueang Terminus	High-Speed Rail Linking Three Airports	Makkasan towards U-Tapao
Location

Krung Thep Aphiwat Central Terminal (Thai: สถานีกลางกรุงเทพอภิวัฒน์, RTGS: Sathani Klang Krung Thep Aphiwat, pronounced [sā.tʰǎː.nīː klāːŋ krūŋ tʰêːp ʔà(ʔ).pʰí(ʔ).wát]; lit. 'Utmost prosperity of Bangkok central station'), also known by its former name Bang Sue Grand Station (Thai: สถานีกลางบางซื่อ, RTGS: Sathani Klang Bang Sue, pronounced [sā.tʰǎː.nīː klāːŋ bāːŋ sɯ̂ː]; lit. 'Bang Sue central station'), is the central station of Thailand. Located along the border of Chatuchak district and Bang Sue district, it replaced the existing Hua Lamphong railway station as the country's central station, with long-distance rail services operating from here from 19 January 2023. The station was opened on 2 August 2021 as part of the operation of the SRT Red Lines, and from May 2021 to September 2022 served as a COVID-19 vaccination center. It is linked to the Bang Sue MRT station via an underground walkway. The name Krung Thep Aphiwat Central Terminal was chosen by King Vajiralongkorn.

It is the largest railway station in Southeast Asia, with 26 platforms—some 600 metres (2,000 ft) long. The station will offer 274,192 m^{2} (2,951,380 sq ft) of usable floor space. The 15 billion baht station is built on 2,325 rai (372 ha; 919 acres) of SRT-owned land and will have maintenance depots for both diesel and electric trains.

Currently, long-distance intercity trains terminate at this station, while ordinary and commuter trains calling at all stations continue onwards to Hua Lamphong and still operate at the old Bang Sue Junction railway station.

== History ==
In 2010 under the government of Prime Minister Abhisit Vejjajiva, the Ministry of Transport decided to move Bangkok's central railway station (Hua Lamphong station) to the area of Bang Sue Junction Railway Station, to be the center of the rail transport system. In 2013, work on the station started with a contract signing by the State Railway of Thailand (SRT), Sino-Thai Engineering Construction PCL, and Unique Construction and Engineering PCL for the Red Line suburban railway system project consisting of civil work for Bang Sue Grand Station and a maintenance center. In December 2020 it was announced that civil construction of the station was complete.

The station acted as a COVID-19 vaccination center from 24 May 2021 to 30 September 2022.

Trial operations of the SRT Red Lines, open to the public, began from the station on 2 August 2021.

A 33-million baht contract to install a new sign with the station's new ceremonial name was put on hold in January 2023 following public concern about the price.

Intercity services began operation from the station on 19 January 2023, with 52 long-distance trains which originally terminated at Bangkok (Hua Lamphong) moved to the station.

== Layout ==
The station will have four floors, three above, and one below ground:

1. Underground floor: Bang Sue MRT station, on the MRT Blue Line, and parking for 1,624 vehicles.
2. Ground floor: Station concourse with ticketing and waiting areas. This will be the only air-conditioned area in the station.
3. Second floor: Train platforms with 12 tracks. Eight tracks will serve long-distance diesel trains (soon to be electrified). Four tracks will serve SRT Red Dark and Light Red Line commuter trains.
4. Third floor: High–speed railway platforms with 10 tracks. Four tracks will serve the AERA1 City and the Don Mueang–Suvarnabhumi–U-Tapao high-speed railway linking Don Mueang International Airport, Suvarnabhumi Airport and U-Tapao International Airport. Six tracks are reserved for future high-speed rail (HSR) connections to Nong Khai, Padang Besar, Thailand and Chiang Mai.

Also planned is a 186,030 m^{2} (2,002,400 sq ft) memorial site to King Rama V, known as the "father of Thai railroads", although this is expected to open after the station itself.

== Phahonyothin Freight Yard ==
Krung Thep Aphiwat Central Terminal is also the location of Phahonyothin cargo yard. With an expanse of about 50 rail-tracks and sidings, it is the largest rail yard in the whole of Thailand. It is located about 1.5 kilometres (0.93 mi) from the station and is the main cargo yard for freight services around Thailand.

== Transportation Center ==
=== Train service ===
Krung Thep Aphiwat Central Terminal provides the following train services:

- State Railway of Thailand Providing special express trains, express trains, and rapid trains, with the final destination being the Krung Thep Aphiwat Central Terminal, which includes:
  - Northern Line: Destination Chiang Mai
  - Northeastern Line: Destination Ubon Ratchathani Or Nong Khai
  - Southern Line: Destination Nakhon Si Thammarat, Kantang, Padang Besar (Thai) Or Su-ngai Kolok
- SRT Red Lines Providing Commuter rail services in the Bangkok and surrounding areas.
  - SRT Dark Red Line: Krung Thep Aphiwat – Rangsit
  - SRT Light Red Line: Krung Thep Aphiwat – Taling Chan

=== Connect train services ===
The following lines have stations near the Krung Thep Aphiwat Central Terminal.

- Blue Line: Lak Song – Tha Phra Connected to Bang Sue Station via an underground walkway inside the station.
- State Railway of Thailand Connect to Bang Sue Junction Railway Station via Exit 5-12, providing suburban train services.
  - Northern Line: Hua Lamphong – Phitsanulok
  - Northeastern Line: Hua Lamphong – Surin
  - Southern Line: Hua Lamphong – Suphan Buri

== Bus connections ==
The following BMTA and Private Jointed routes serve this station:

- 3 (Kamphaeng Phet Bus Depot - Mo Chit 2 - Khlong San)
- 3 (Kamphaeng Phet Bus Depot - BTS Mochit Station) (Loop)
- 16 (Kamphaeng Phet Bus Depot - Mo Chit 2 - Surawong)
- 49 (Kamphaeng Phet Bus Depot - Hua Lamphong Railway Station) (Loop)
- 52 (Pak Kret - Vibhavadi Rangsit Rd. - Mo Chit 2) (Only go to Mo Chit 2)
- 67 (Kamphaeng Phet Bus Depot - Central Plaza Rama III)
- 77 (Central Plaza Rama III - Mo Chit 2) (Only go to Mo Chit 2)
- 96 (Min Buri - Mo Chit 2) (Drop off at railway station)
- 104 (Pak Kret - Phahonyothin Rd. - Mo Chit 2) (Only go to Mo Chit 2)
- 134 (Bua Thong Kheha - Mo Chit 2) (Drop off at railway station)
- 136 (Khlong Toei - Mo Chit 2) (Drop off at railway station)
- 138 (Phra Pradaeng Pier - Mo Chit 2) (Drop off at railway station)
- 138 (Ratchapracha - Mo Chit 2) (Drop off at railway station)
- 145 (Pak Nam (Praeksa Bordin) - Mo Chit 2) (Drop off at railway station)
- 145 (Mega Bangna - Mo Chit 2) (Drop off at railway station)
- 157 (Bang Khae - Phuttha Monthon 1 st rd. - Expressway - Victory Monument)
- 170 (Phuttha Monthon 2 nd rd. - Charan Sanit Wong rd. - Mo Chit 2)
- 509 (Borommaratchachonnani - Phuttha Monthon 2 nd rd. - Mo Chit 2) (Only go to Mo Chit 2)
- 517 (Kamphaeng Phet Bus Depot - Mo Chit 2 - KMITL)
- 536 (Pak Nam - Expressway - Mo Chit 2) (Only go to Mo Chit 2)

== Gallery ==
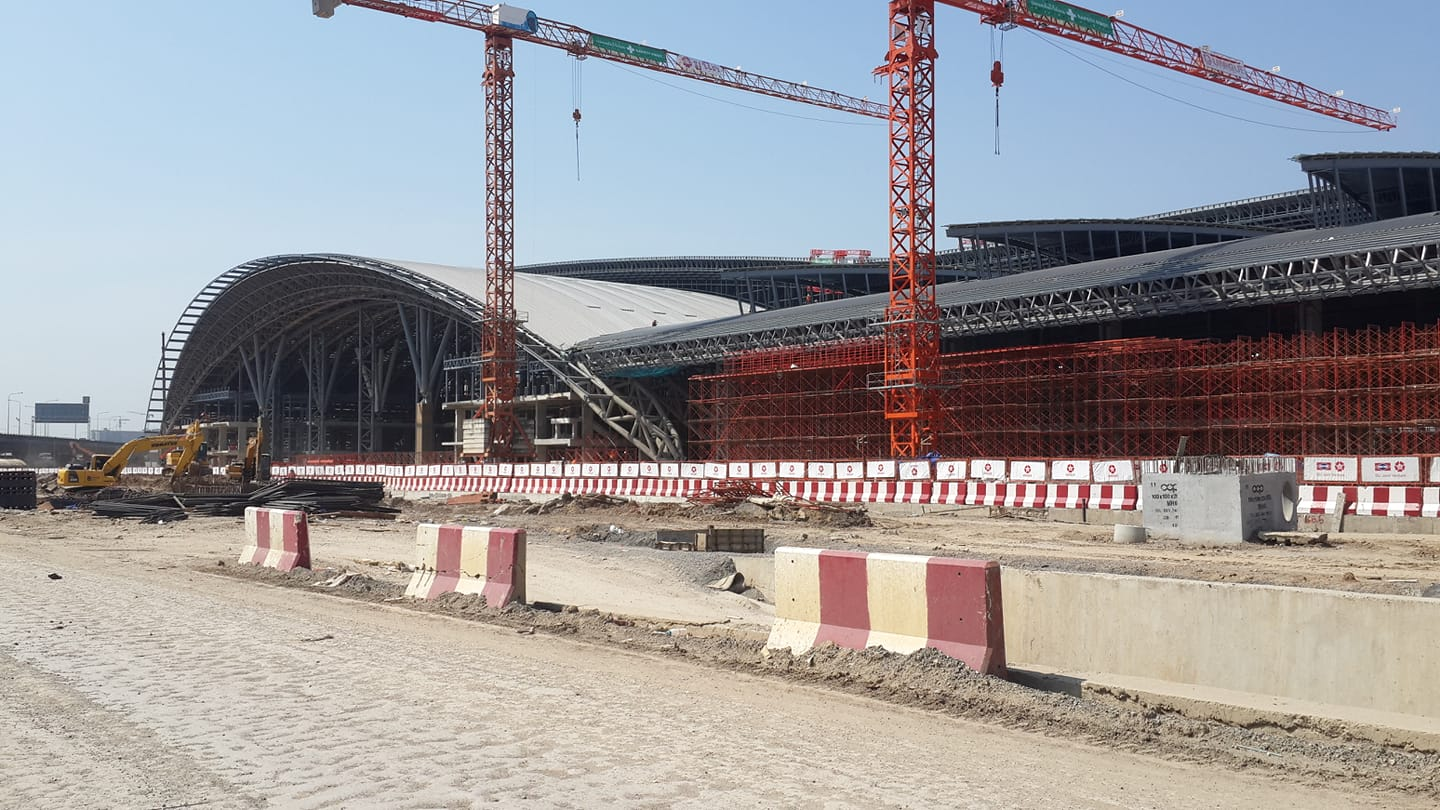
Construction of the station in December 2019

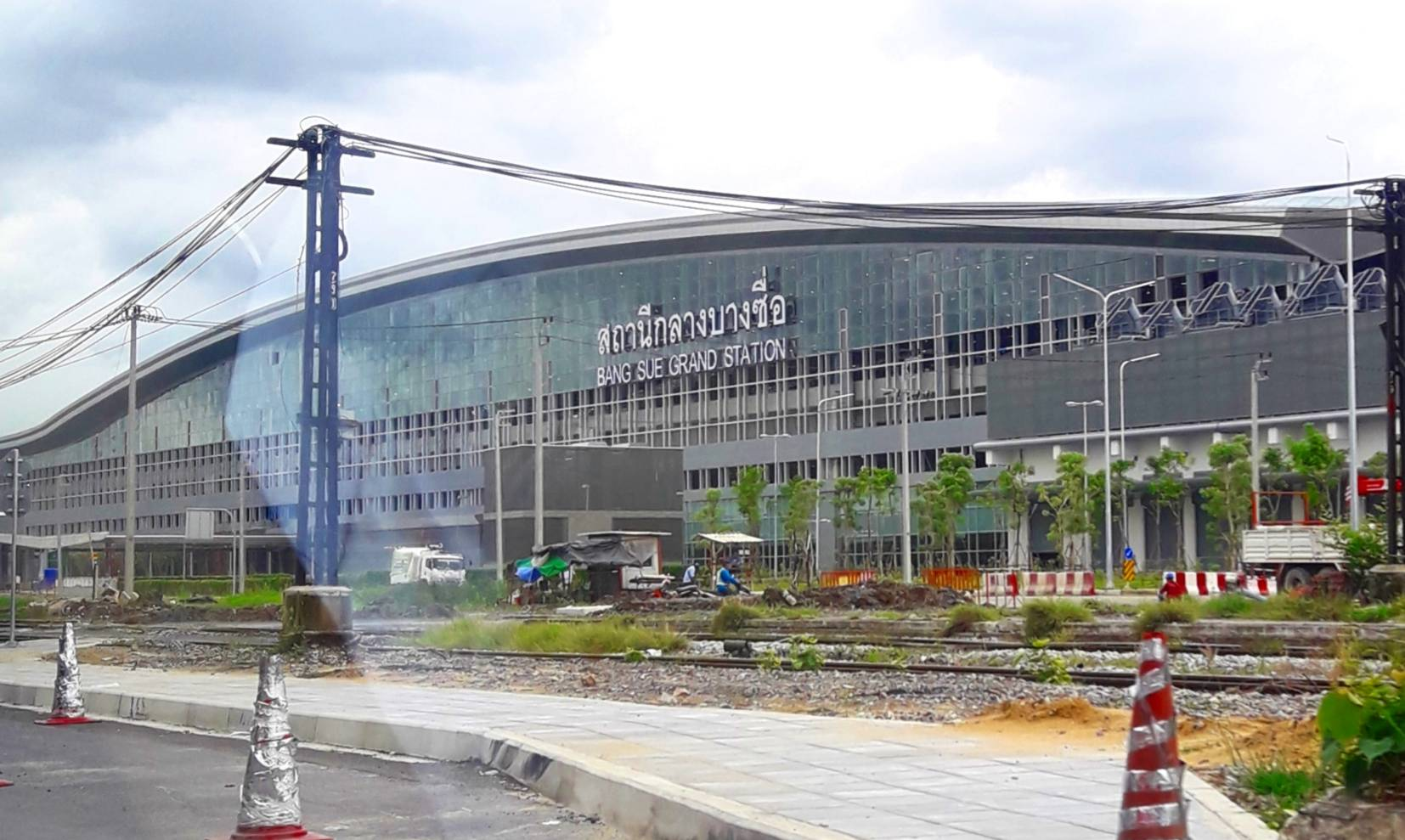
View from Bang Sue Junction railway station in June 2020

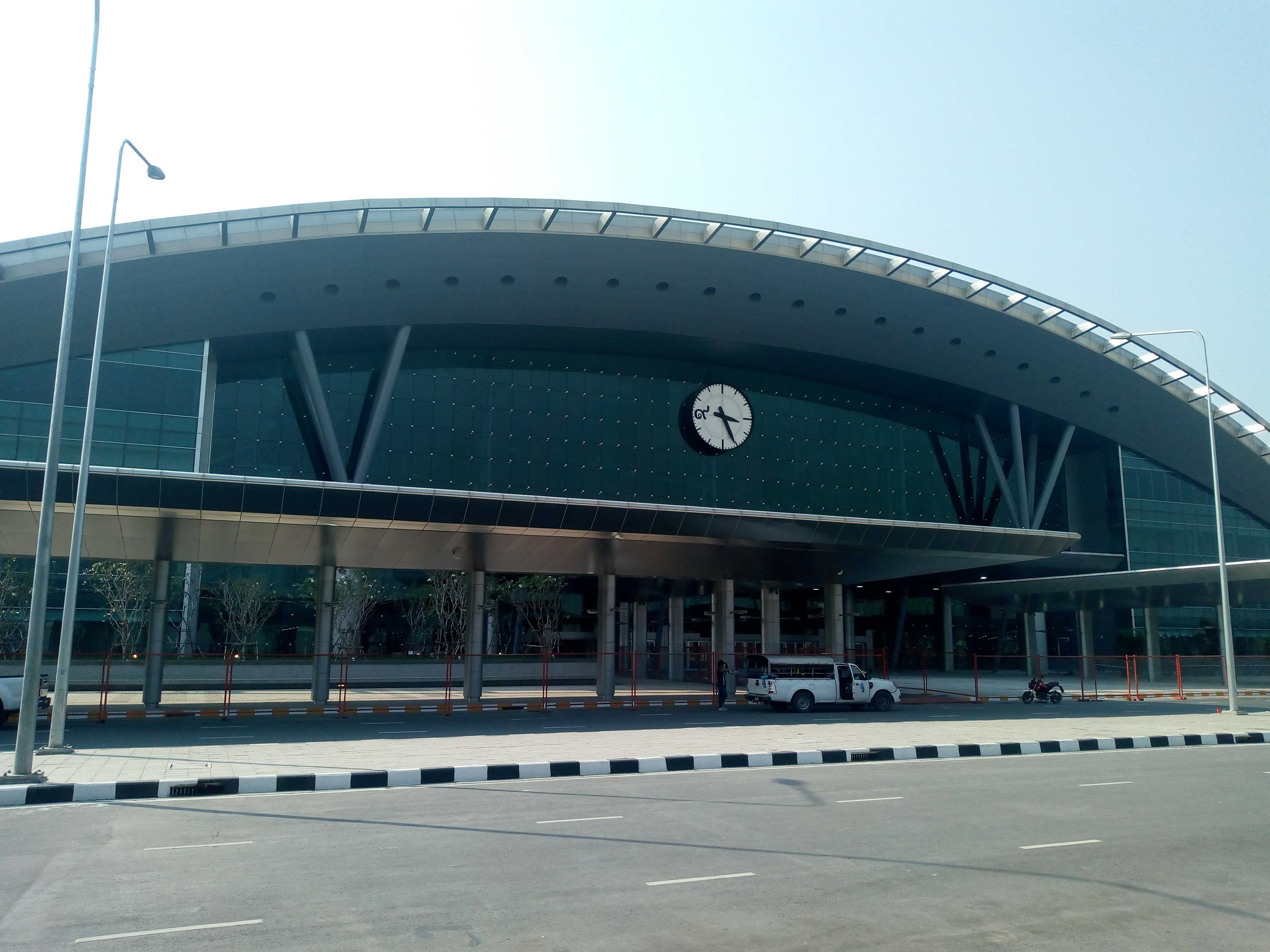
Station facade in February 2021

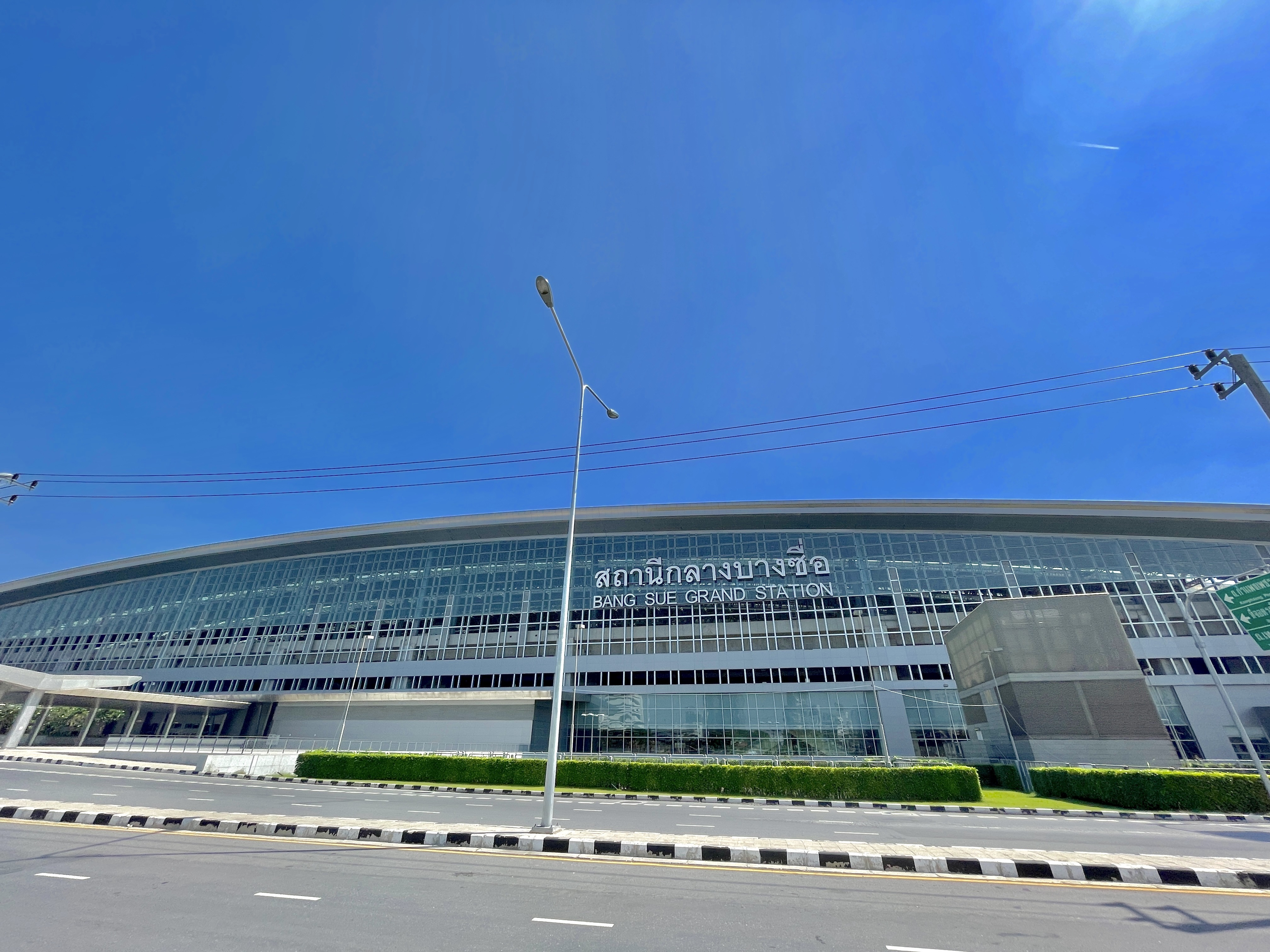
Sign showing the name "Bang Sue Grand Station"

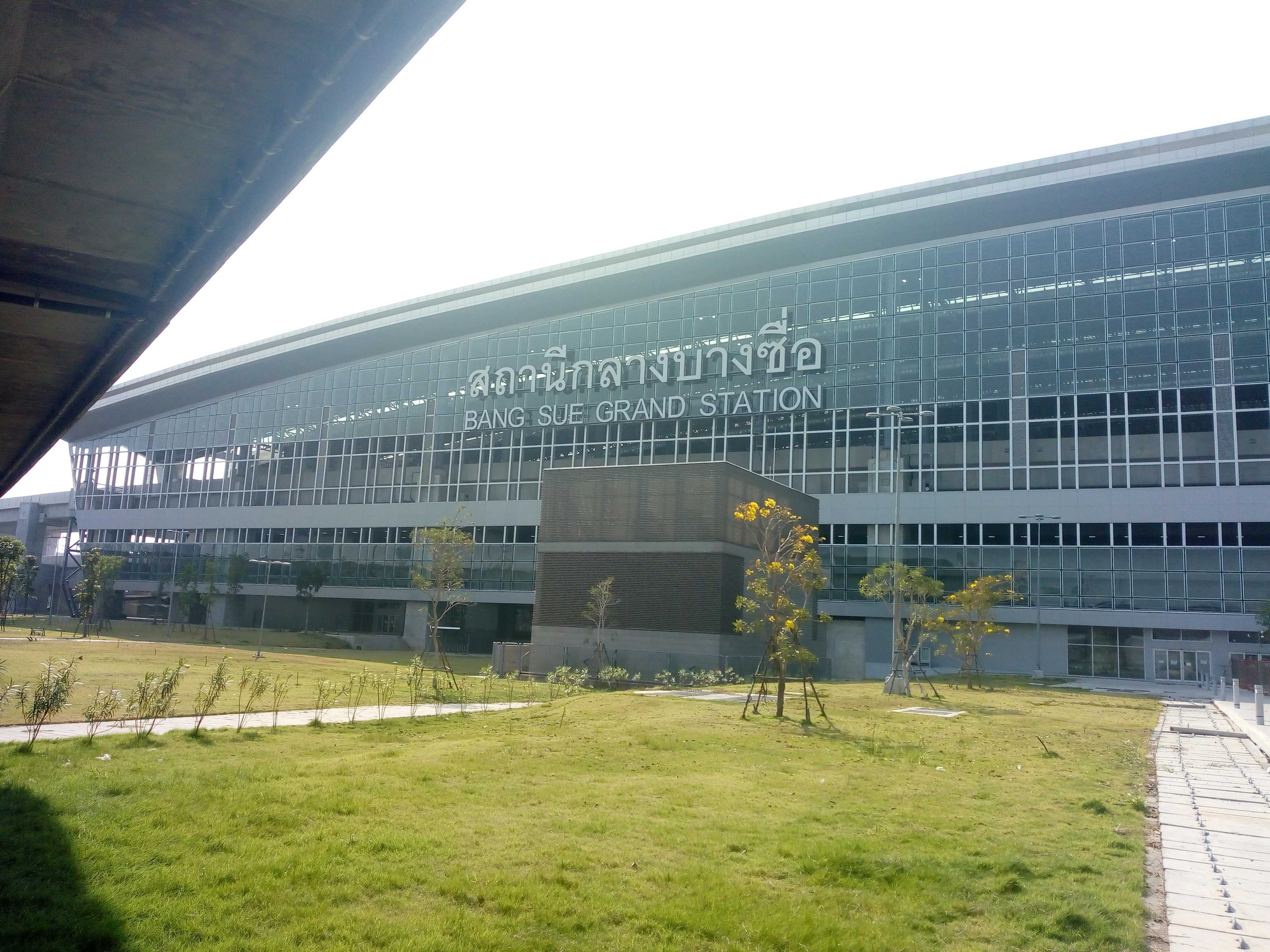
Sign showing the name "Bang Sue Grand Station"

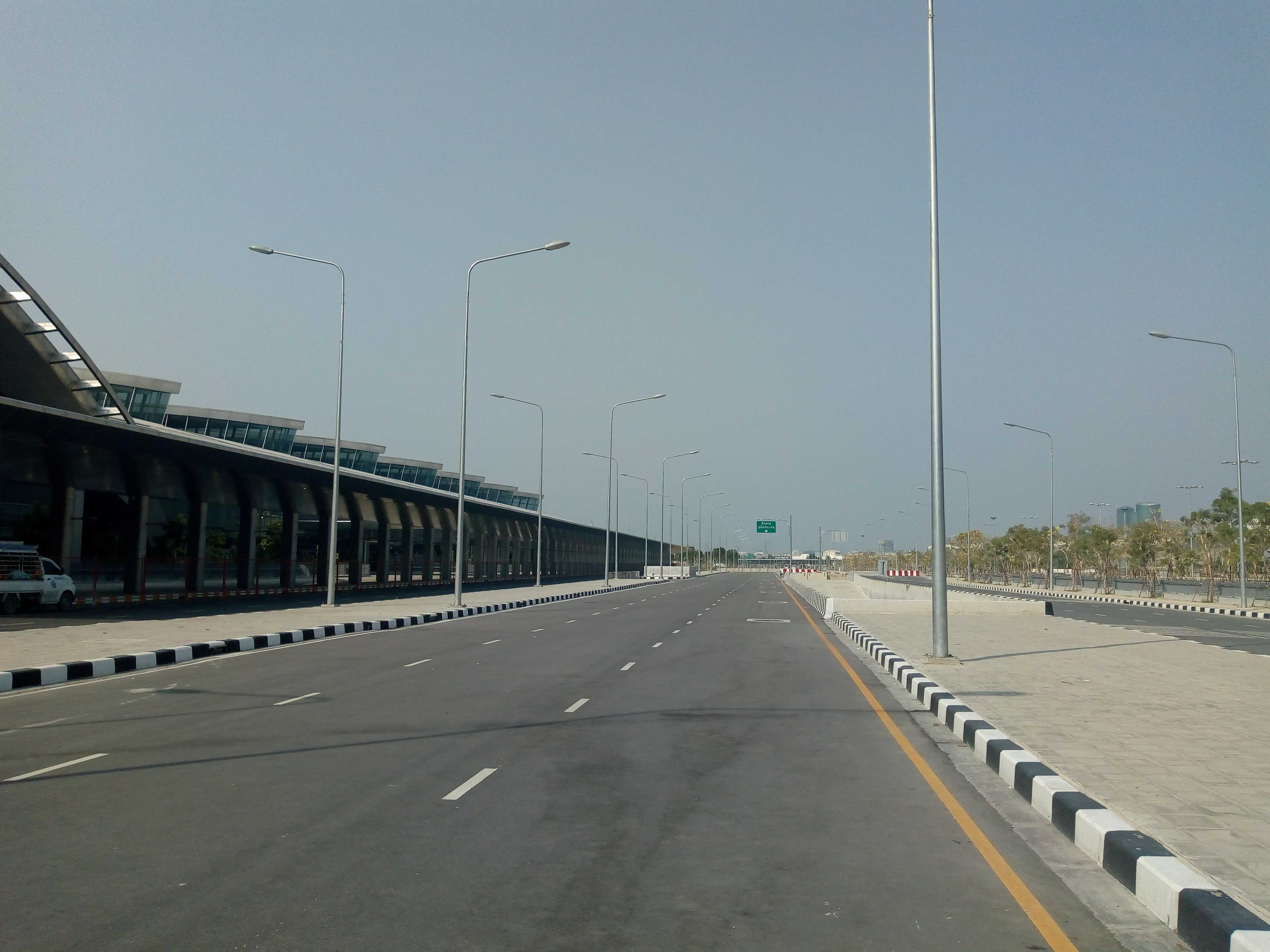
New road near the entrance

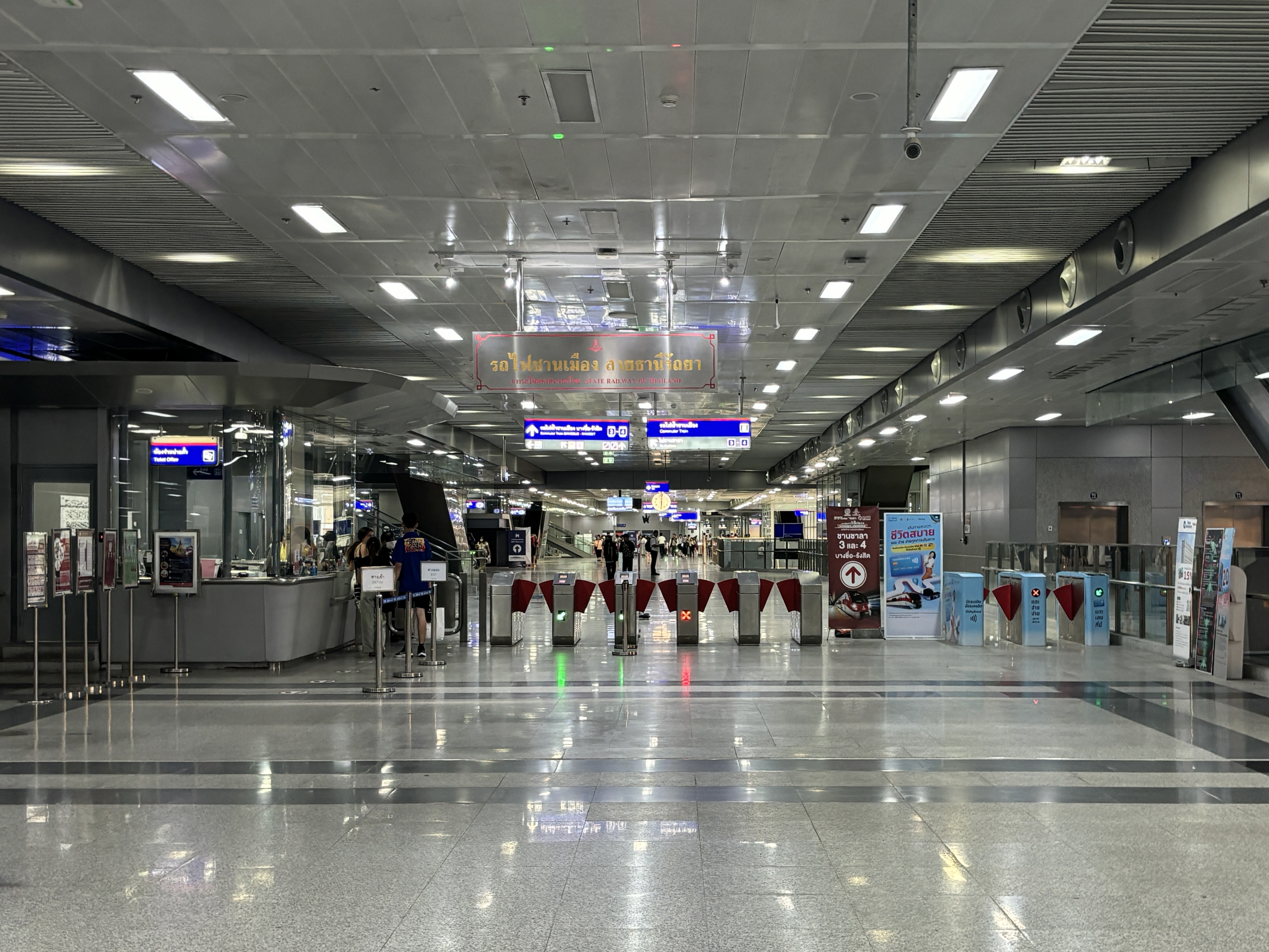
Station concourse with Dark Red Line faregates.

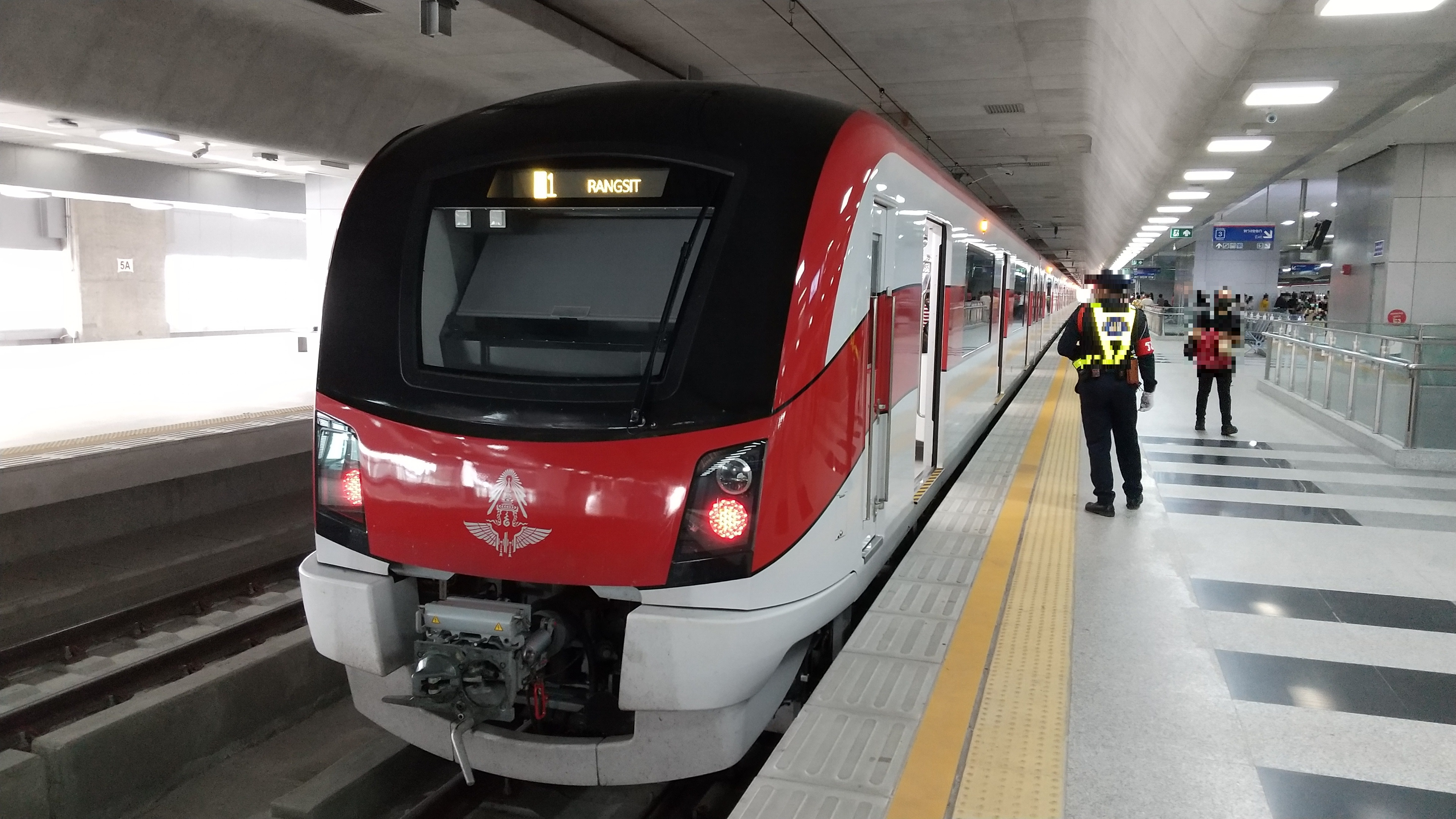
SRT Dark Red Line train at the station

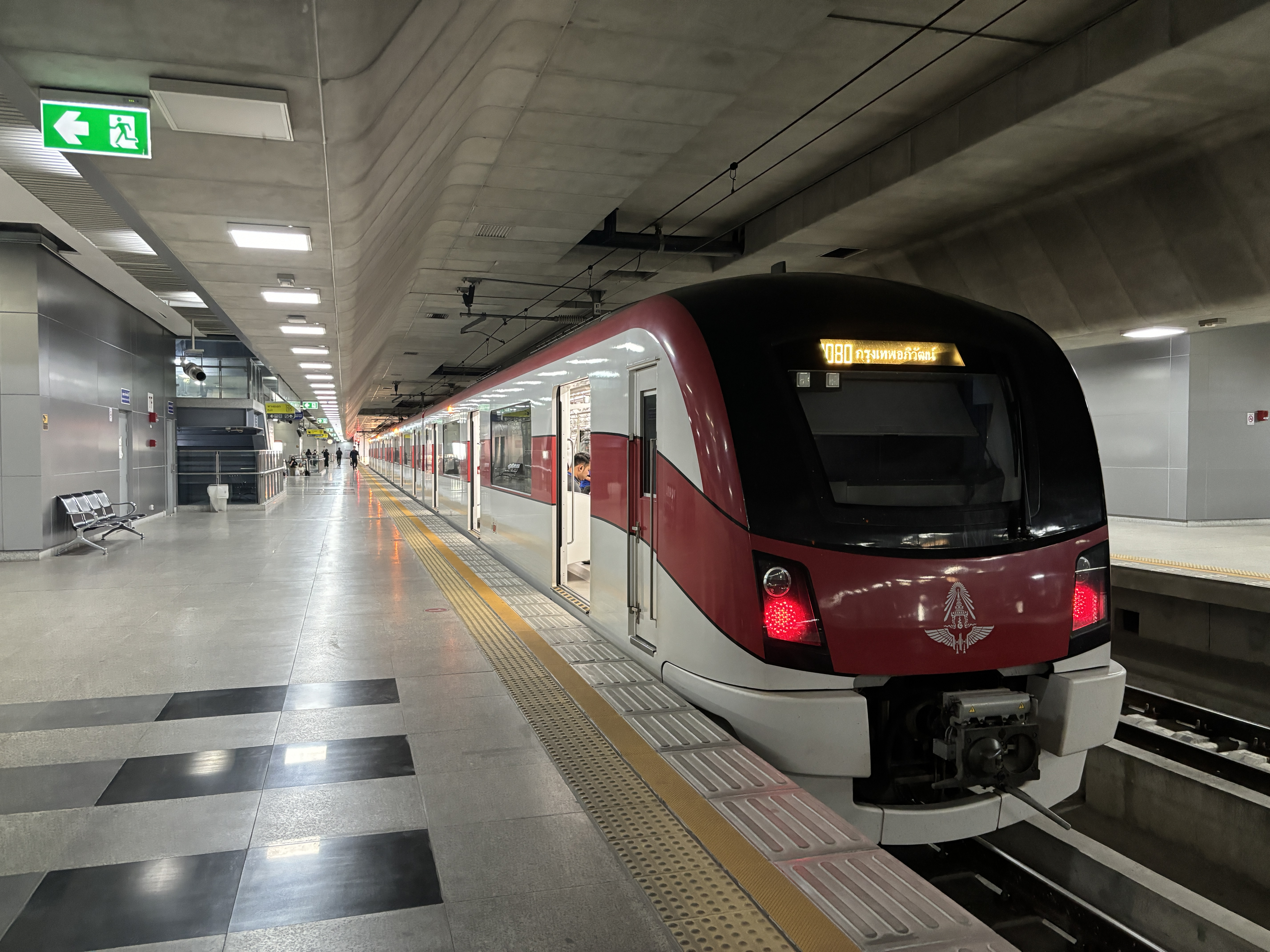
SRT Light Red Line train at the station

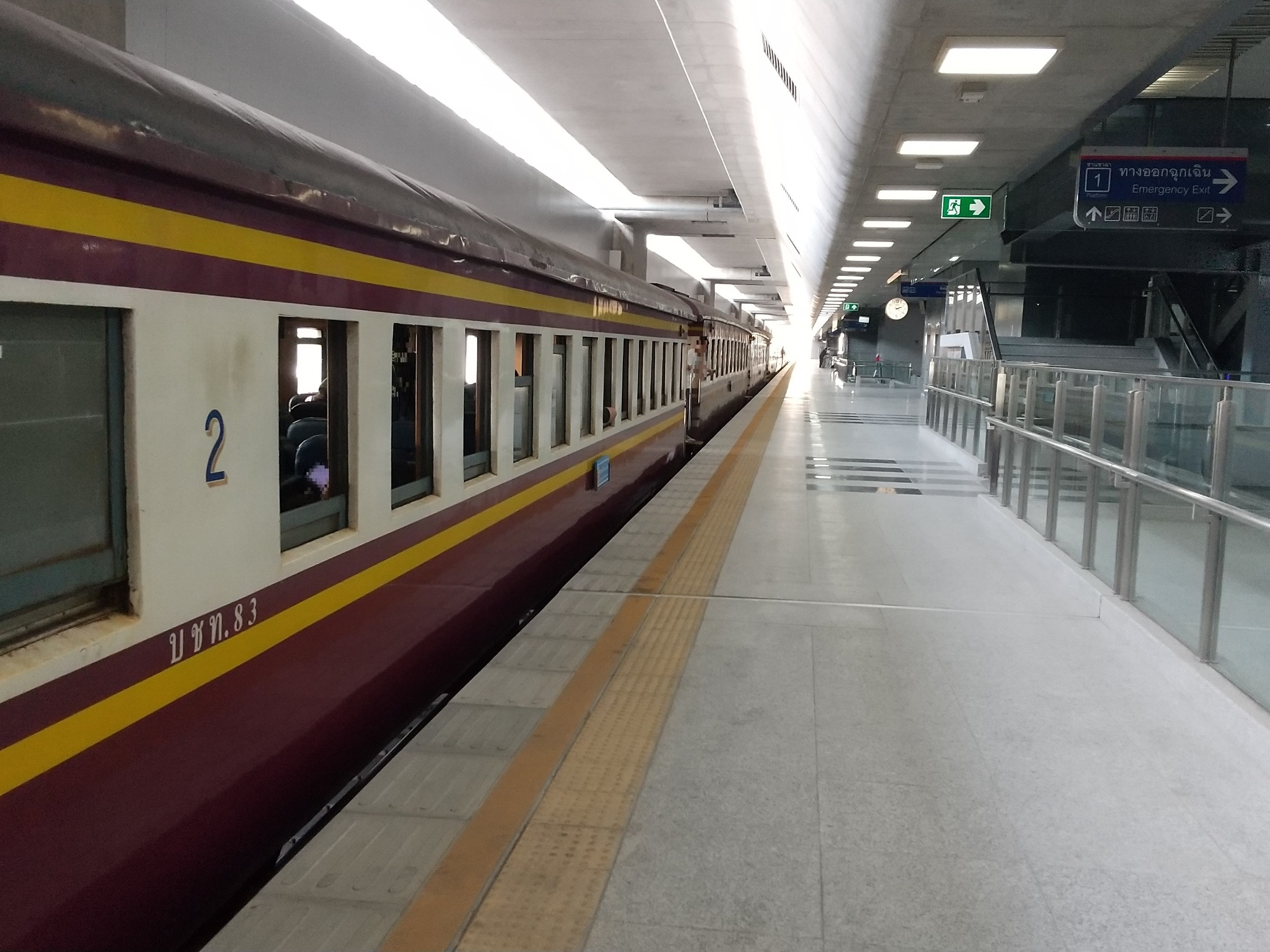
Intercity train at the station

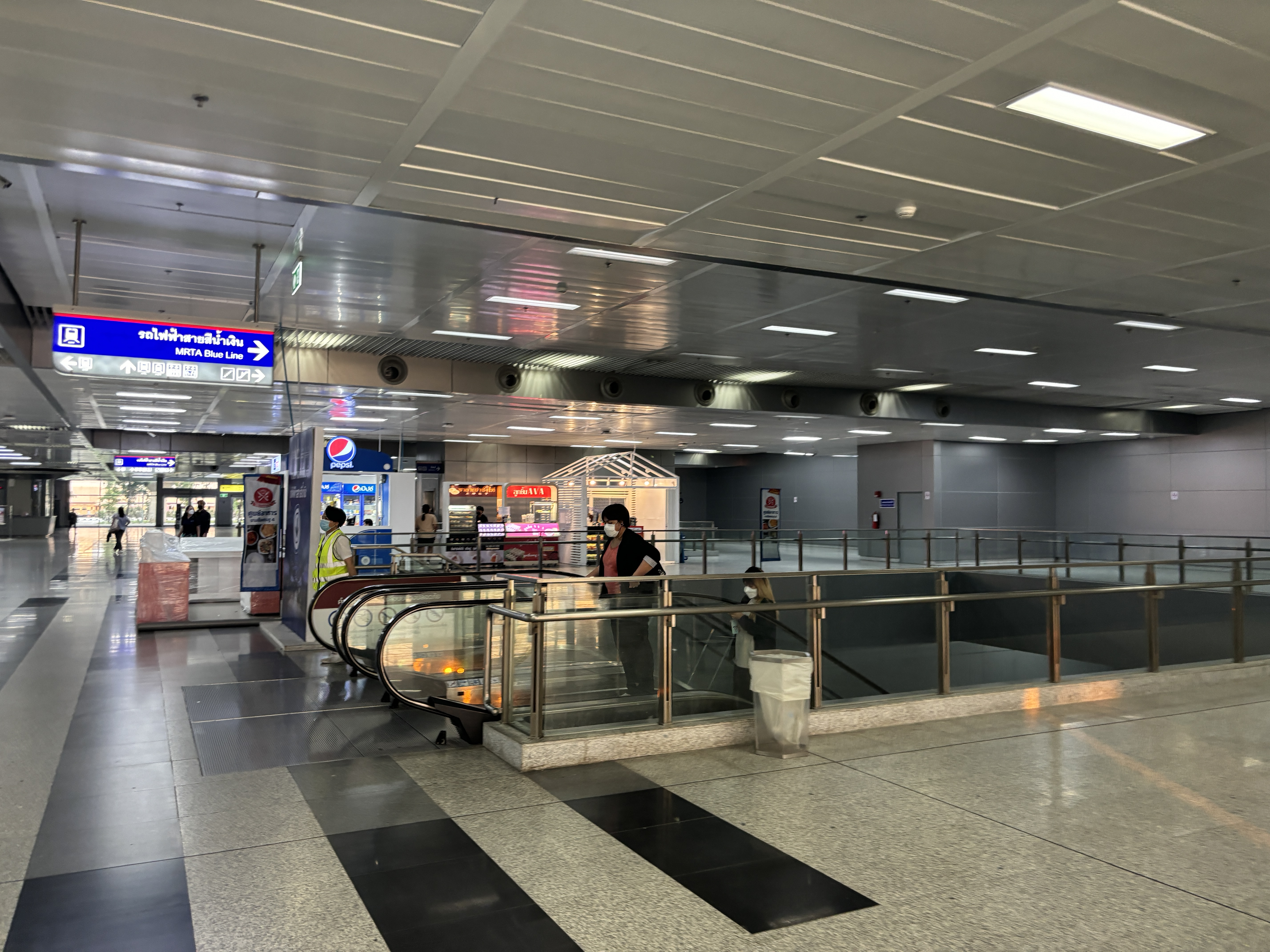
Entrance to Bang Sue MRT Station

== See also ==
- List of railway stations in Thailand
- Bang Sue Junction railway station
- Hua Lamphong railway station

Other interchange stations in Bangkok with paid area integration.

- Muang Thong Thani MRT station
- Siam BTS station
- Tao Poon MRT station
- Wat Phra Sri Mahathat station
