= Mo Chit BTS station =

Railway station in Bangkok, Thailand

Mo Chit หมอชิต
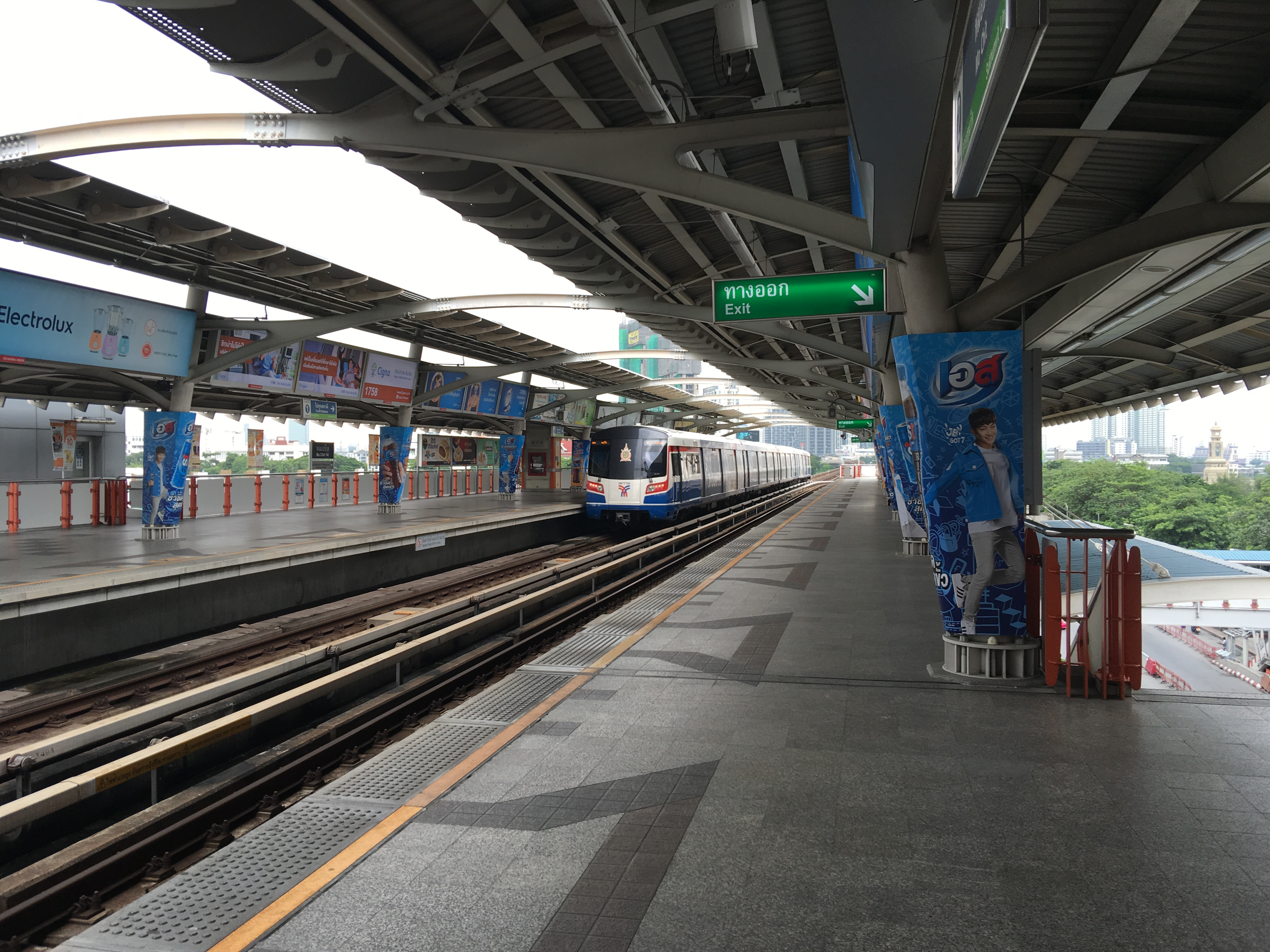
- Mo Chit BTS Station

General information
- Location: Chatuchak; Bangkok; Thailand
- Coordinates: 13°48′9.30″N 100°33′13.80″E
- System: BTS
- Owner: Bangkok Metropolitan Administration (BMA); BTS Rail Mass Transit Growth Infrastructure Fund (BTSGIF)
- Operator: Bangkok Mass Transit System; Public Company Limited (BTSC)
- Line: Sukhumvit Line
- Platforms: Side platforms
- Tracks: 2, 1 Spur Going to the Depot
- Connections: Blue Line (Chatuchak Park)

Construction
- Structure type: Elevated

Other information
- Station code: N8

History
- Opened: 5 December 1999

Passengers
- 2021: 5,166,915

Services
| Preceding station | BTS Skytrain | Following station |
|---|---|---|
| Ha Yaek Lat Phrao towards Khu Khot | Sukhumvit Line | Saphan Khwai towards Kheha |
| Preceding station | Metropolitan Rapid Transit | Following station |
| Phahon Yothin towards Lak Song | Blue Line transfer at Chatuchak Park | Kamphaeng Phet towards Tha Phra |
Location

Mo Chit Station Traditional sign

Mo Chit Station (Thai: สถานีหมอชิต, pronounced [sā.tʰǎː.nīː mɔ̌ː t͡ɕʰít]) is a BTS Skytrain station, on the Sukhumvit Line in Chatuchak District, Bangkok, Thailand. The station is located above Phahonyothin Road between Soi Phahon Yothin 18 and Soi Phahon Yothin 20. The station is named after the old Mo Chit Bus Terminal, whose building was repurposed as the BTS depot. Mo Chit station also served as the northern terminus of the Sukhumvit Line until 9 August 2019 when Ha Yaek Lat Phrao BTS station opened.

== Nearby landmarks ==
The station is situated directly above Chatuchak Park MRT station which opened in 2004, allowing for an interchange outside the paid area via street level. Other nearby landmarks include BTS Depot, Chatuchak Park, Chatuchak Weekend Market and Mo Chit 2 Bus Terminal.

== Gallery ==
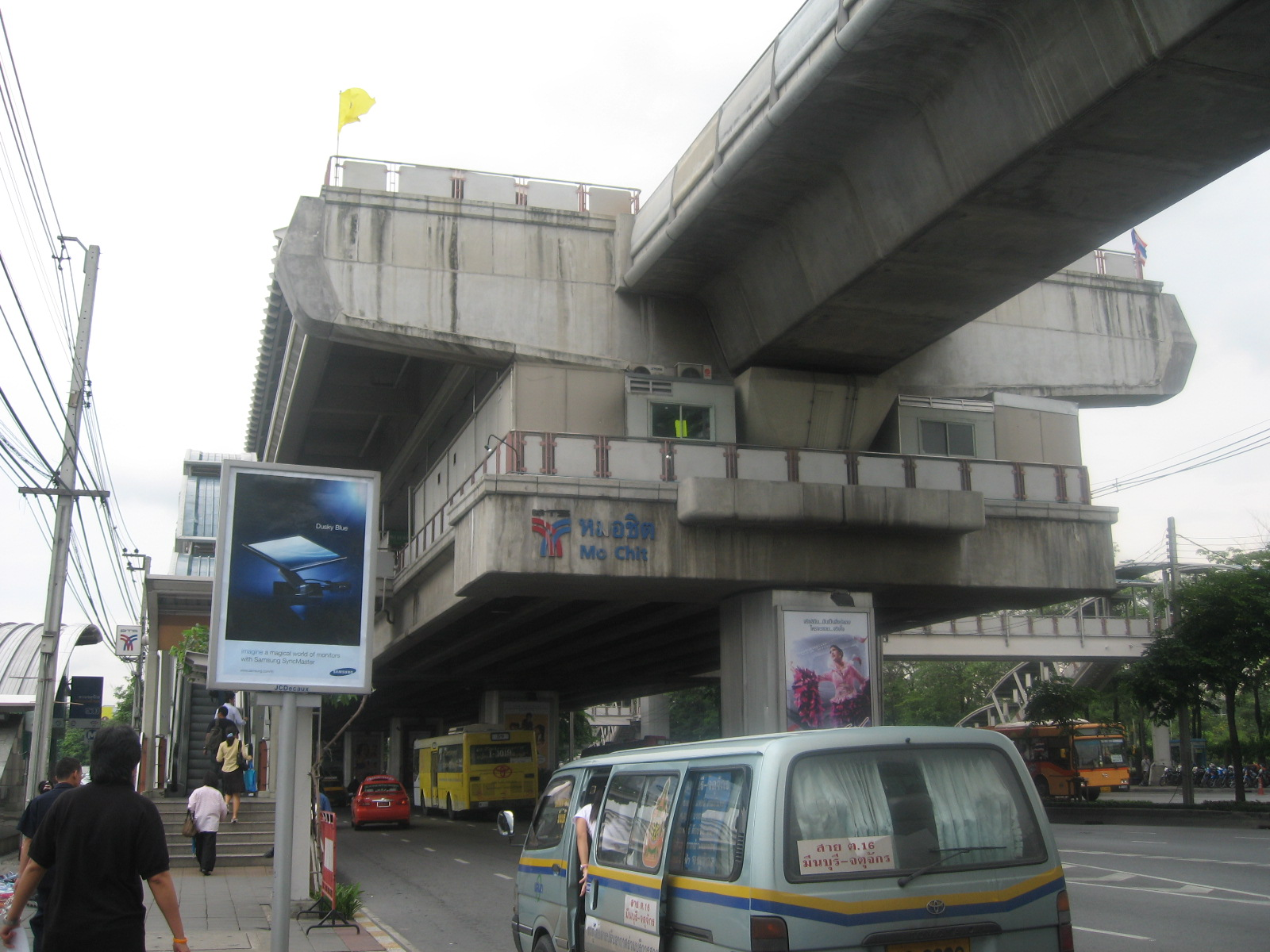
Street level view

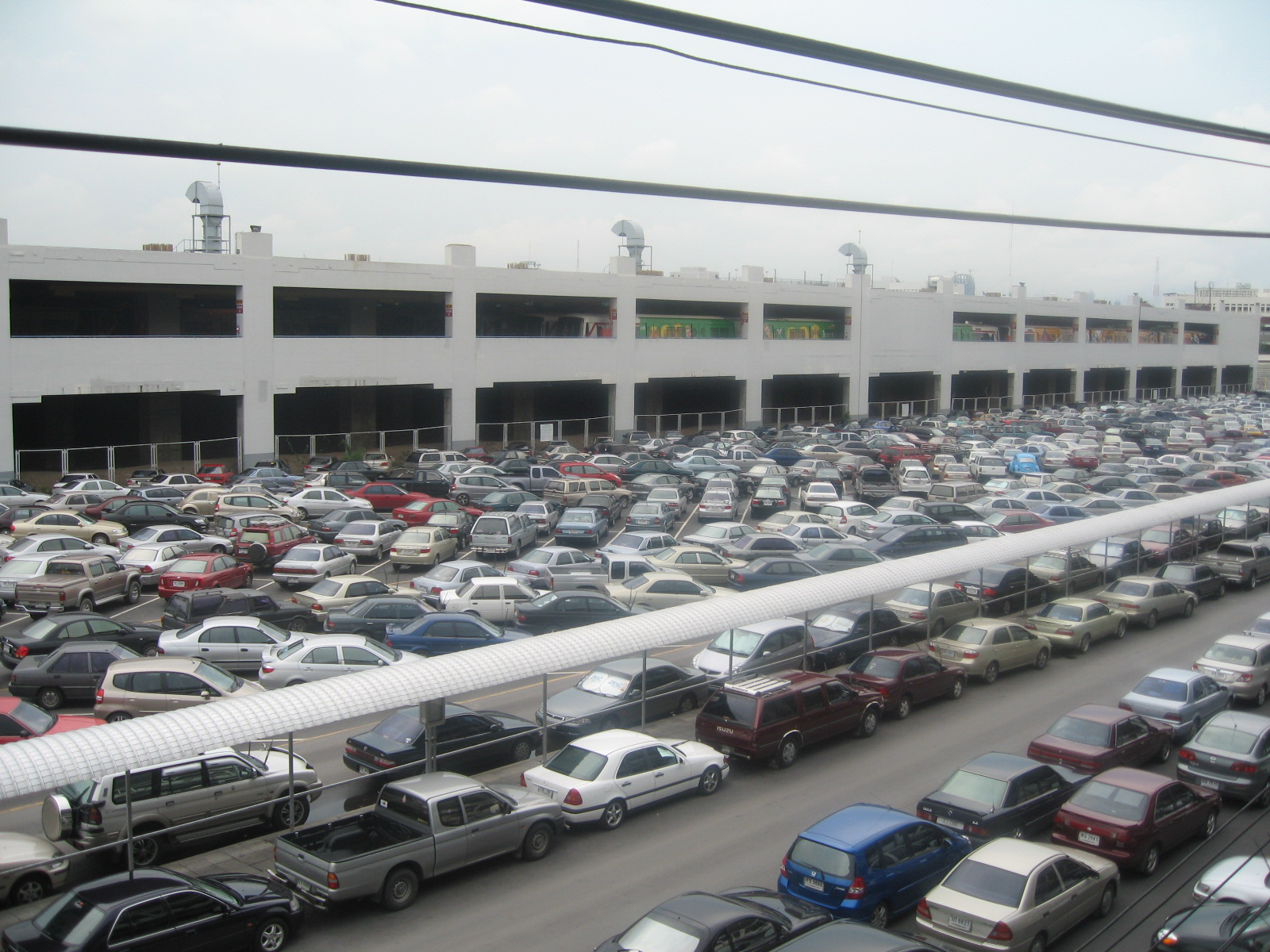
BTS Depot

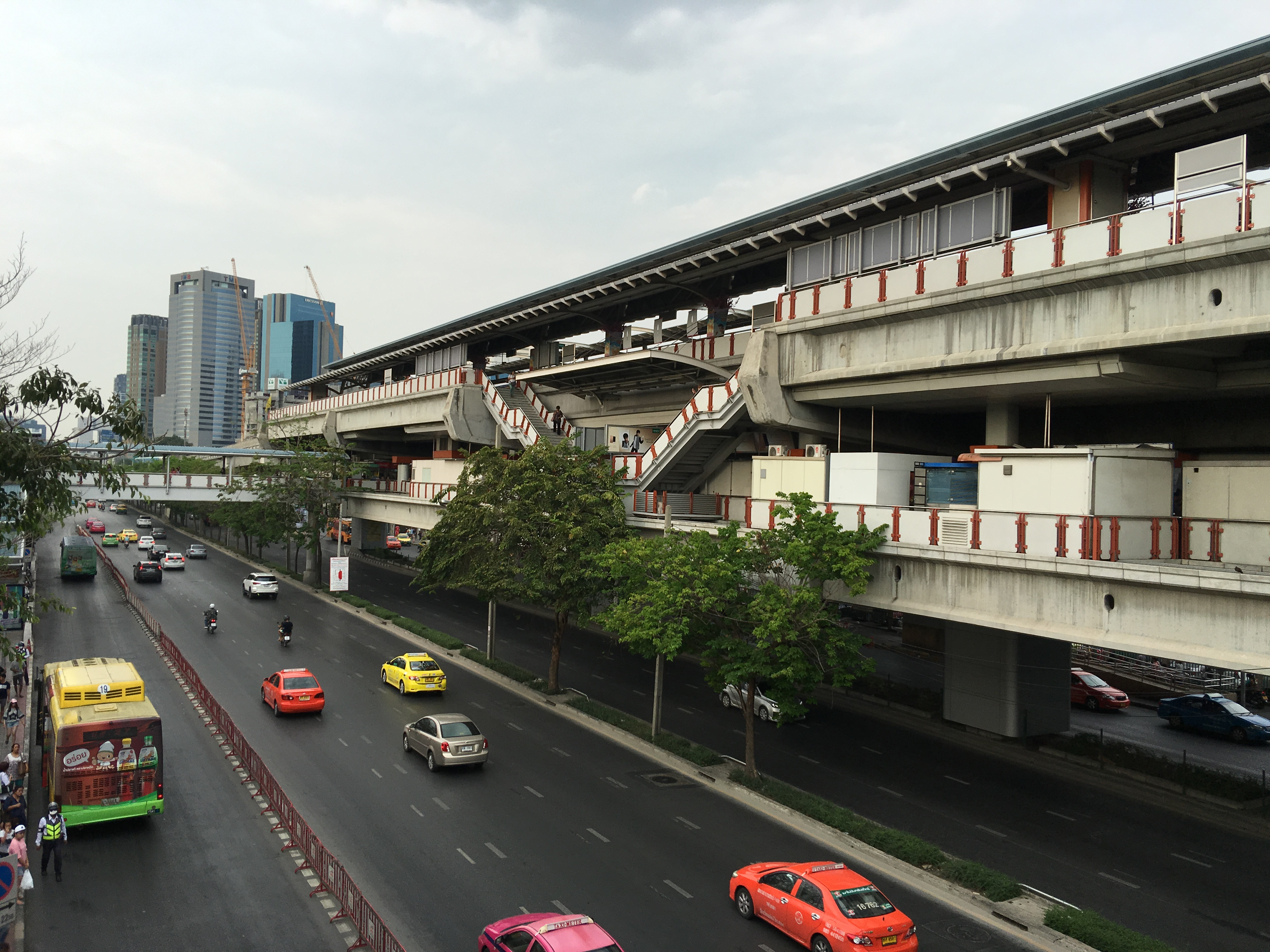
Side view

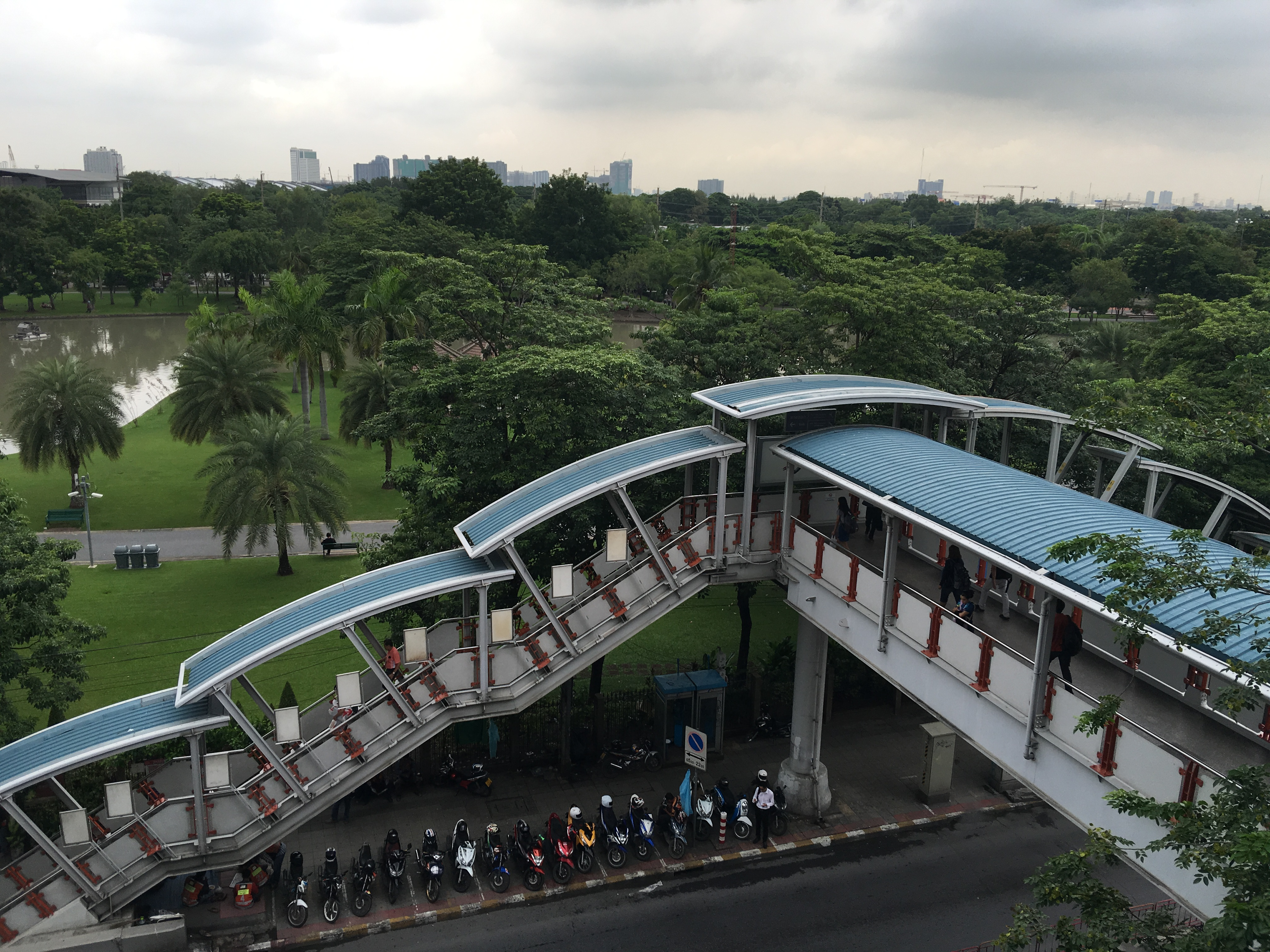
Chatuchak Park

== See also ==
- BTS Skytrain
