= Or Tor Kor Market =

Market in Bangkok, Thailand

Coordinates: 13.7971°N 100.5475°E

Or Tor Kor Market (Thai: ตลาด อ.ต.ก., RTGS: O To Ko) or Marketing Organization for Farmers Market is a large fresh market in Bangkok, Thailand. Located opposite Chatuchak Weekend Market and next to Kamphaeng Phet MRT station, Or Tor Kor sells a variety of produce and prepared foods. Opened in 1974, the market is operated by the Marketing Organization for Farmers (Thai: องค์การตลาดเพื่อเกษตรกร), and was once listed by CNN as one of the top 10 fresh markets in the world in 2017. The market is especially known for premium fruit products, including durian and mango.

== 2025 shooting ==
On July 28, 2025, a man hijacked a taxi and parked it near Gate 1 at the mall before opening fire on people at the market near a donation point, killing five people, four security guards and a vendor, and injuring two women, before killing himself on a bench. The perpetrator was identified as 61-year-old Noi Praidaen, a resident of Khong district, Nakhon Ratchasima. Police said at a press conference that the shooter had a conflict since 2020 with a security guard named "Mr. Nan" at the market after he dropped off his wife to sell dried food at the market and parked his car there, which was slashed.
