= Chatuchak Park MRT station =

Railway station in Bangkok, Thailand

Coordinates: 13.8027°N 100.5540°E

สวนจตุจักร BL13 Chatuchak Park
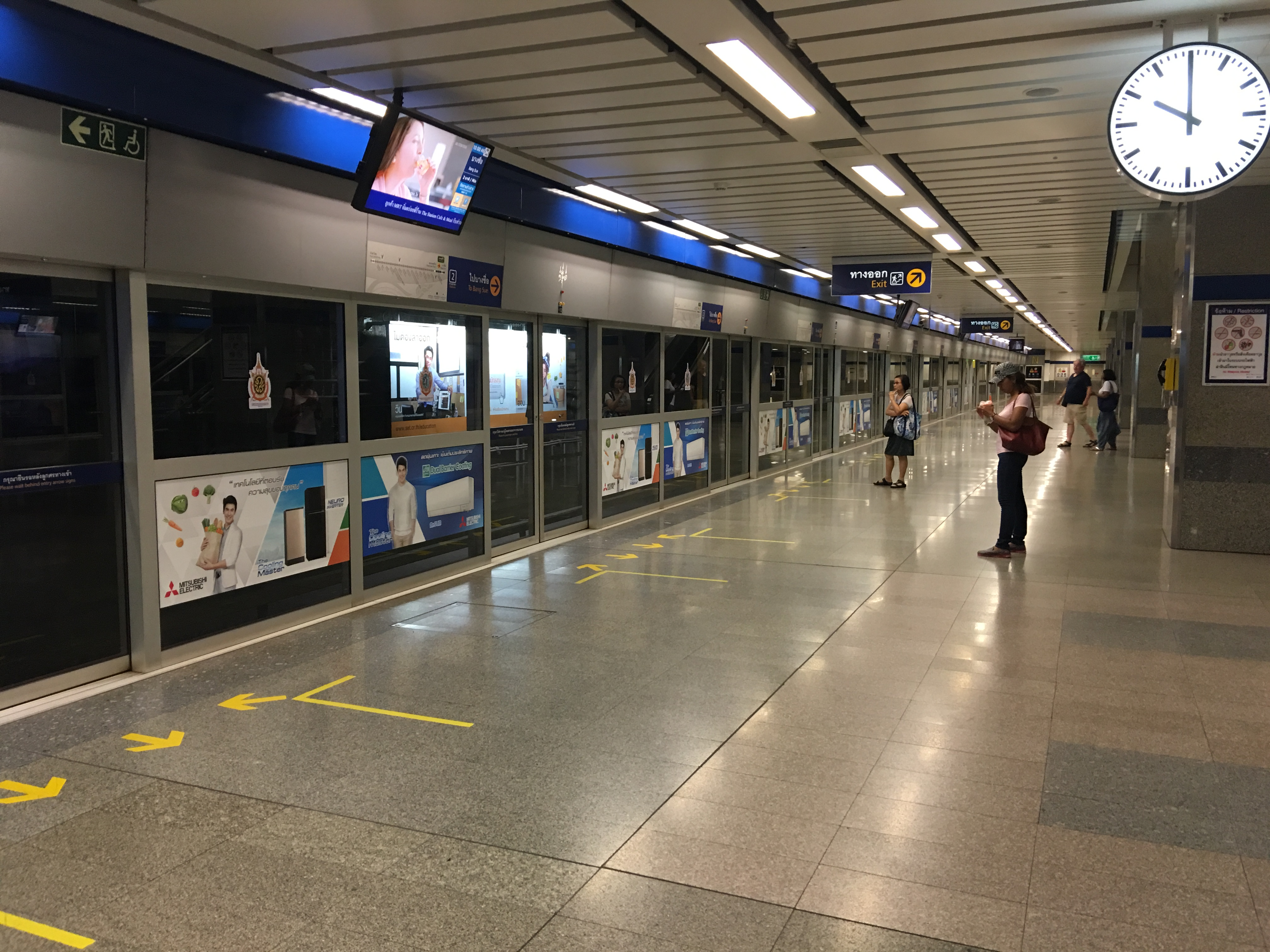

General information
- Location: Chatuchak, Bangkok, Thailand
- System: MRT
- Owner: Mass Rapid Transit Authority of Thailand (MRTA)
- Operator: Bangkok Expressway and Metro Public Company Limited (BEM)
- Line: MRT Blue Line
- Platforms: 1 island platform
- Tracks: 2
- Connections: BTS Sukhumvit Line

Construction
- Structure type: Underground
- Accessible: yes

Other information
- Station code: BL13

History
- Opened: 3 July 2004; 22 years ago
- Former names: Mo Chit

Passengers
- 2021: 6,865,636

Services
Preceding station	Metropolitan Rapid Transit	Following station
Phahon Yothin towards Lak Song	Blue Line	Kamphaeng Phet towards Tha Phra via Bang Sue
Preceding station	BTS Skytrain	Following station
Ha Yaek Lat Phrao towards Khu Khot	Sukhumvit Line transfer at Mo Chit	Saphan Khwai towards Kheha
Location

Chatuchak Park station (Thai: สถานีสวนจตุจักร, RTGS: Sathani Suan Chatuchak, pronounced [sā.tʰǎː.nīː sǔa̯n t͡ɕàʔ.tùʔ.t͡ɕàk]) is a Bangkok MRT station on the Blue Line. It is located under the eastern part of Chatuchak Park. It is also located near the eastern exit of the Chatuchak Weekend Market. The station, which opened in July 2004, is an important interchange station of northern Bangkok because passengers can connect to BTS Sukhumvit Line at Mo Chit station. The symbol color, which is decorated on the pillars, is blue.

== Station layout ==
G	-	Bus stop
B1	Basement	Exits 1–4, MetroMall
B2	Concourse	Ticket machines
B3	Platform 2	Blue towards Tha Phra via Bang Sue (Kamphaeng Phet)
B3	Island platform, doors will open on the right
B3	Platform 1	Blue towards Lak Song (Phahon Yothin)
