= Bang Sue Junction railway station =

Railway station in Bangkok, Thailand

Coordinates: 13.8028°N 100.5394°E

Bang Sue Junction ชุมทางบางซื่อ
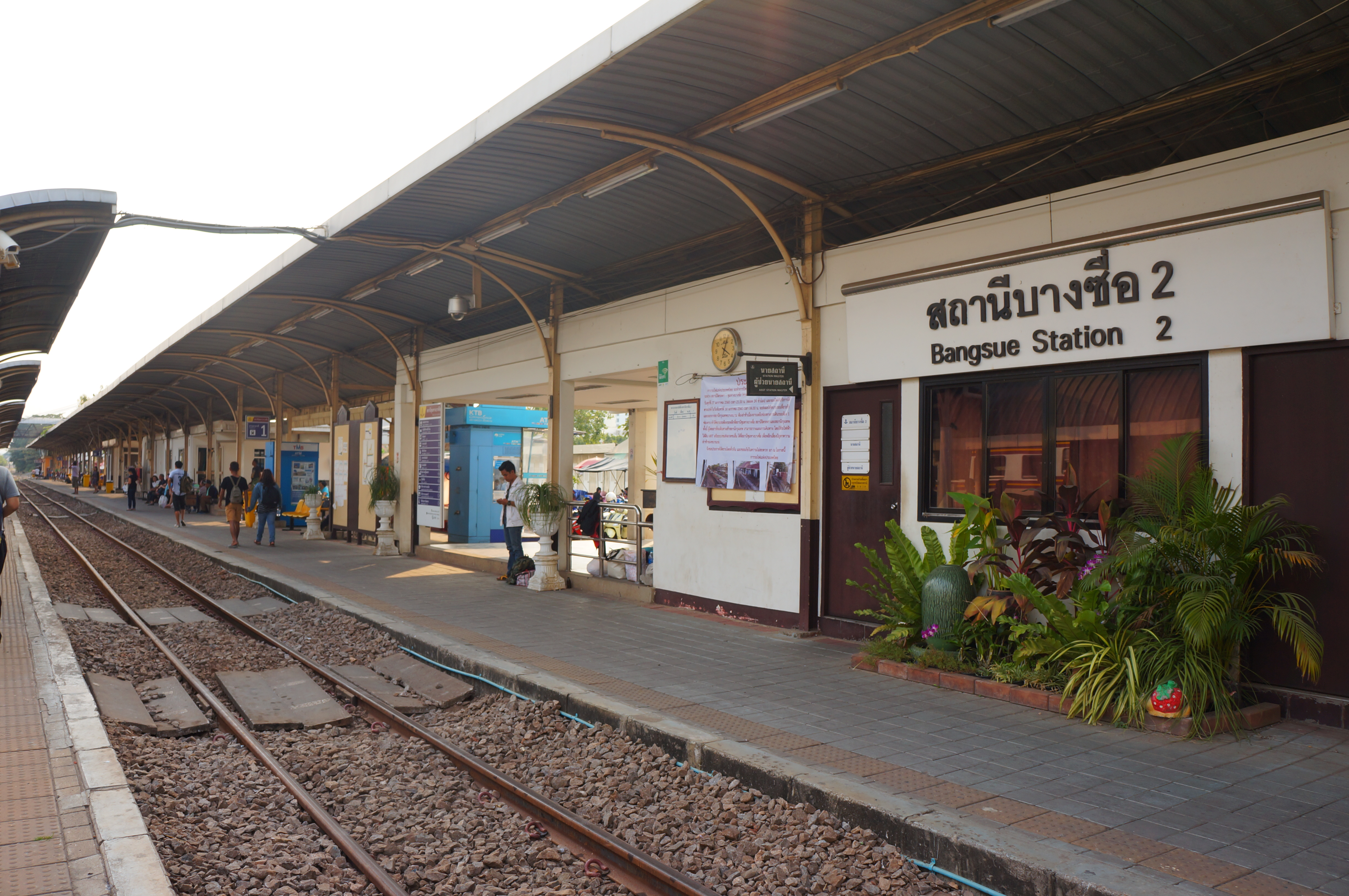
- Bang Sue 2 station

General information
- Other names: Bang Sue 1 Bang Sue 2
- Location: Thoet Damri Road, Bang Sue district, Bangkok; Central Region; Thailand
- Operator: State Railway of Thailand
- Manager: Ministry of Transport
- Platforms: 4
- Tracks: 4
- Connections: Bang Sue MRT station BMTA / Private Jointed Bus; Taxis / Motorcycle taxi

Construction
- Structure type: At-grade
- Parking: Yes
- Cycle facilities: Yes
- Accessible: Yes

Other information
- Status: Active (Bang Sue 2); Preparation of closure
- Station code: บซ.
- Classification: Class 1

History
- Opened: 1898; 128 years ago
- Closed: 15 August 2016; 10 years ago (Bang Sue 1)

Services
Preceding station	State Railway of Thailand	Following station
Sam Sen towards Hua Lamphong	Northern Line	Don Mueang towards Chiang Mai
Sam Sen towards Hua Lamphong	Northeastern Line	Don Mueang towards Ubon Ratchathani or Khamsavath (Laos)
Sam Sen towards Hua Lamphong	Southern Line	Bang Son towards Su-ngai Kolok
Location

Bang Sue Junction (Thai: สถานีชุมทางบางซื่อ, RTGS: Sathani Chumthang Bang Sue), is a railway station and junction located in Bangkok. It is situated on Thoet Damri Road, Bang Sue district. It is owned and operated by State Railway of Thailand, serves the Northern, Northeastern, and Southern Lines, and is a junction for the North/Northeast and South Lines.

Following the opening of Krung Thep Aphiwat Central Terminal, located adjacent to the station, all long-distance services stopped operating from the station from 19 January 2023. Currently, only ordinary trains (that call at all stations) and commuter trains which terminate at Bangkok (Hua Lamphong) railway station operate at the station. This is because there is currently no rail connection between the elevated platforms of the new station and the railway line south of the station towards Bangkok (Hua Lamphong) station. The station is expected to close, when the rail connection is completed.

Transport links include the Bangkok MRT, and the BMTA.

== History ==
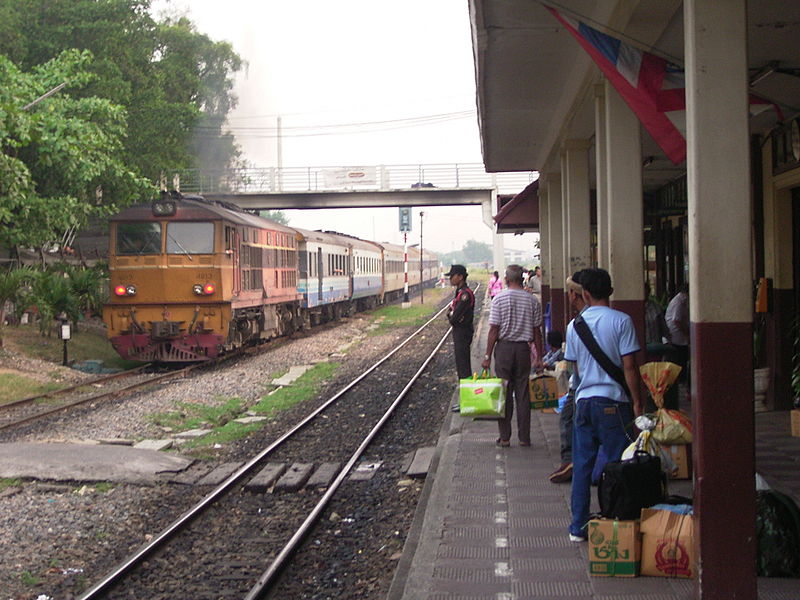
Bang Sue 1 railway station (for Northern and Northeastern Lines) which was closed in August 2016

Bang Sue opened in 1898 as part of Thailand's first railway between Bangkok and Ayutthaya. On 1 January 1927, it became a junction for the Northern/Northeastern Line and the Southern Line after the construction of the rail link between Bang Sue and Taling Chan, over Rama VI Bridge. In 1989, Bang Sue was separated into two railway stations. The original building was renamed "Bang Sue 1" was used for Northern and Northeastern Line services while the new building "Bang Sue 2" was used for Southern Line services. The distance between the buildings were about 200 metres apart.

Bang Sue 1 was closed on 15 August 2016 in preparation for the construction of the new railway station, while trains on all lines now call at the Bang Sue 2 station, which is still in operation.

== Bus connections ==
The following BMTA and Private Jointed routes serve this station:

- 30 (Wat Pak Nam (Nonthaburi) - Southern Bus Terminal (Taling Chan))
- 50 (Rama VII – Lumphini Park)
- 65 (Wat Pak Nam (Nonthaburi) – Sanam Luang)
- 67 (Wat Samian Nari – CentralPlaza Rama III)
- 70 (Prachaniwet 3 – Sanam Luang)
- 97 (Ministry of Public Health – Priest Hospital) (Ordinary Bus)
- 97 (Ministry of Public Health – Victory Monument) (Air-Conditioned Bus (BMTA))
- 97 (Wat Thang Luang – Priest Hospital) (Air-Conditioned Bus (Private Jointed))
- 1-33 (196) (Bang Khen - Bang Sue) (Loop)
- 2-17 (112) (Kasetsart Uni. - Bang Sue) (Loop)

== Phahonyothin freight yard ==
Bang Sue Junction is also the location of the Phahonyothin cargo yard. With an expanse of about 50 rail tracks and sidings, it is the largest rail yard in Thailand. It is located about 1.5 kilometers from the station and is the main cargo yard for freight services around Thailand.
