= Bang Sue MRT station =

Railway station in Bangkok, Thailand

บางซื่อ BL11 Bang Sue
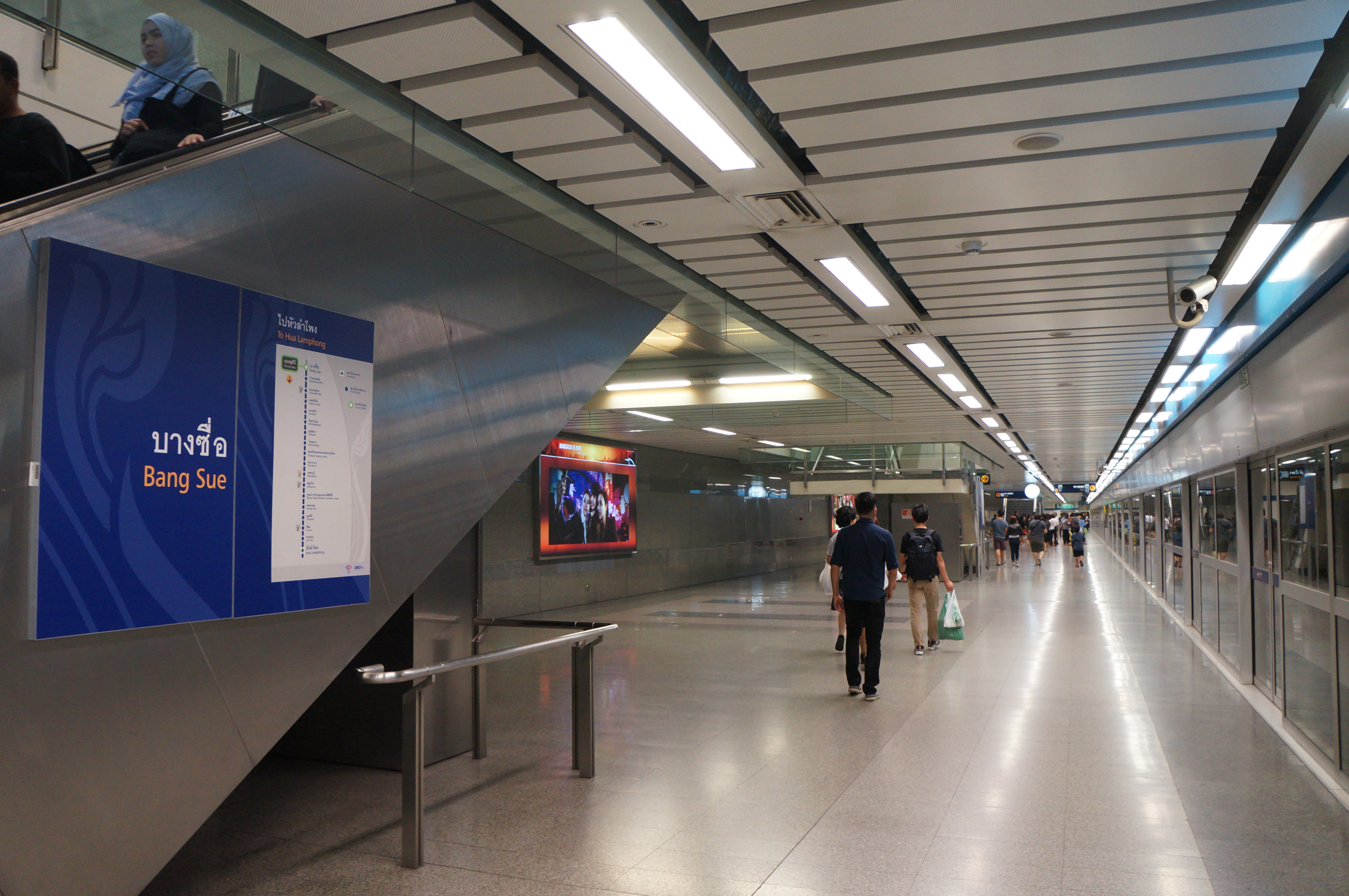

General information
- Location: Chatuchak, Bang Sue, Bangkok, Thailand
- Coordinates: 13.802431°N 100.540933°E
- System: MRT
- Owner: Mass Rapid Transit Authority of Thailand (MRTA)
- Operator: Bangkok Expressway and Metro Public Company Limited (BEM)
- Line: Blue Line
- Platforms: 2 side platforms
- Tracks: 2
- Connections: Bang Sue Junction railway station Krung Thep Aphiwat Central Terminal

Construction
- Structure type: Underground
- Depth: 12 m (39 ft)
- Platform levels: 2
- Parking: Yes

Other information
- Station code: BL11

History
- Opened: 3 July 2004; 22 years ago

Passengers
- 2021: 1,916,531

Services
| Preceding station | Metropolitan Rapid Transit | Following station |
|---|---|---|
| Kamphaeng Phet towards Lak Song | Blue Line | Tao Poon towards Tha Phra |
Location

Bang Sue MRT station (Thai: สถานีบางซื่อ, pronounced [sā.tʰǎː.nīː bāːŋ sɯ̂ː]; code BL11) is a Bangkok MRT rapid transit station on the MRT Blue Line, located near Bang Sue Junction railway station, in Bangkok. It connects to SRT Dark Red Line and SRT Light Red Line at Krung Thep Aphiwat Central Terminal located above the station. Its symbol color is blue.

Bang Sue was the terminus of the MRT Blue Line between 2004 and 2017.

== Station details ==
Its symbol color is blue. It is an underground station 30 by 226m and 12m deep. The platforms are side platforms.

== Station layout ==
| G | - | Krung Thep Aphiwat Central Terminal, Bang Sue Junction railway station |
| B1 | Concourse | Ticket machines |
| B2; Platform | Side platform, doors will open on the left |
| B2; Platform | Platform 1 | Blue towards Lak Song (Kamphaeng Phet) |
| B2; Platform | Platform 2 | Blue towards Tha Phra (Tao Poon) |
| B2; Platform | Side platform, doors will open on the left |

== Bus connections ==
The following BMTA and Private Jointed routes serve this station:

- 50 (Rama VII Bridge - Lumphini Park)
- 52 (Pak Kret - MRT Bang Sue Station)
- 65 (Nonthaburi Pak Nam Temple - Sanam Luang)
- 67 (SRT Wat Samian Nari Station - Central Plaza Rama III)
- 70 (Pracha Niwet 3 Village - Sanam Luang)
- 97 (Ministry of Public Health - Priest Hospital) (BMTA Ordinary Bus / Private Jointed Bus / Thaismile Bus)
- 97 (Ministry of Public Health - Victory Monument) (BMTA Air-Con Bus)
- 1-33 (Bang Khen - MRT Bang Sue Station)
- 2-17 (112 Old) (MRT Bang Sue Station - Pracha Nukul Intersection - Kasetsart University) (Loop)

== Nearby landmarks ==
- Bang Sue Junction railway station
- Krung Thep Aphiwat Central Terminal
- Siam Cement

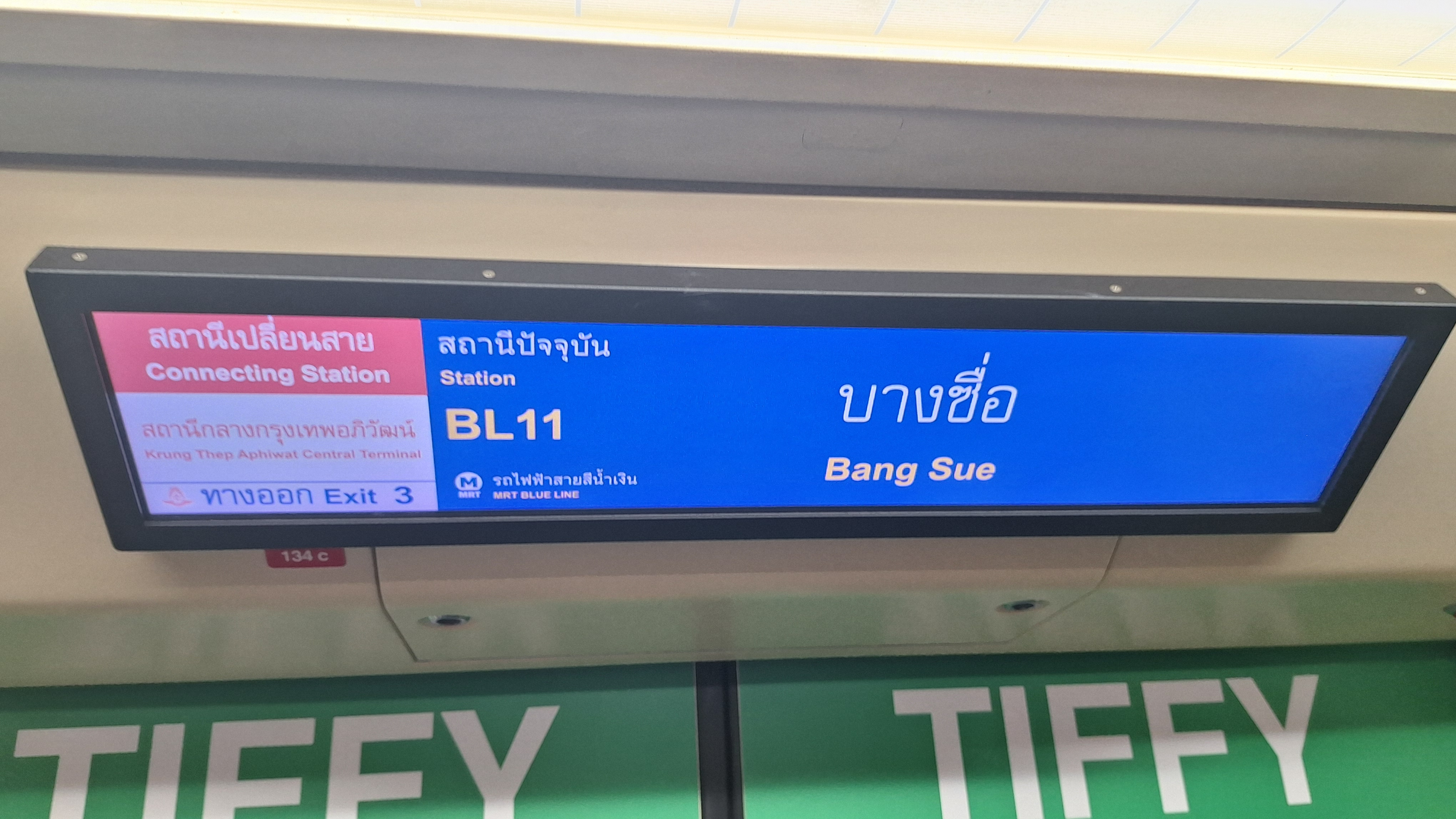
LCD Dynamic Route Map on MRT Blue Line (Bang Sue MRT station)
