= Chatuchak Weekend Market =

Street market in Bangkok, Thailand

Coordinates: 13°48′03″N 100°33′05″E

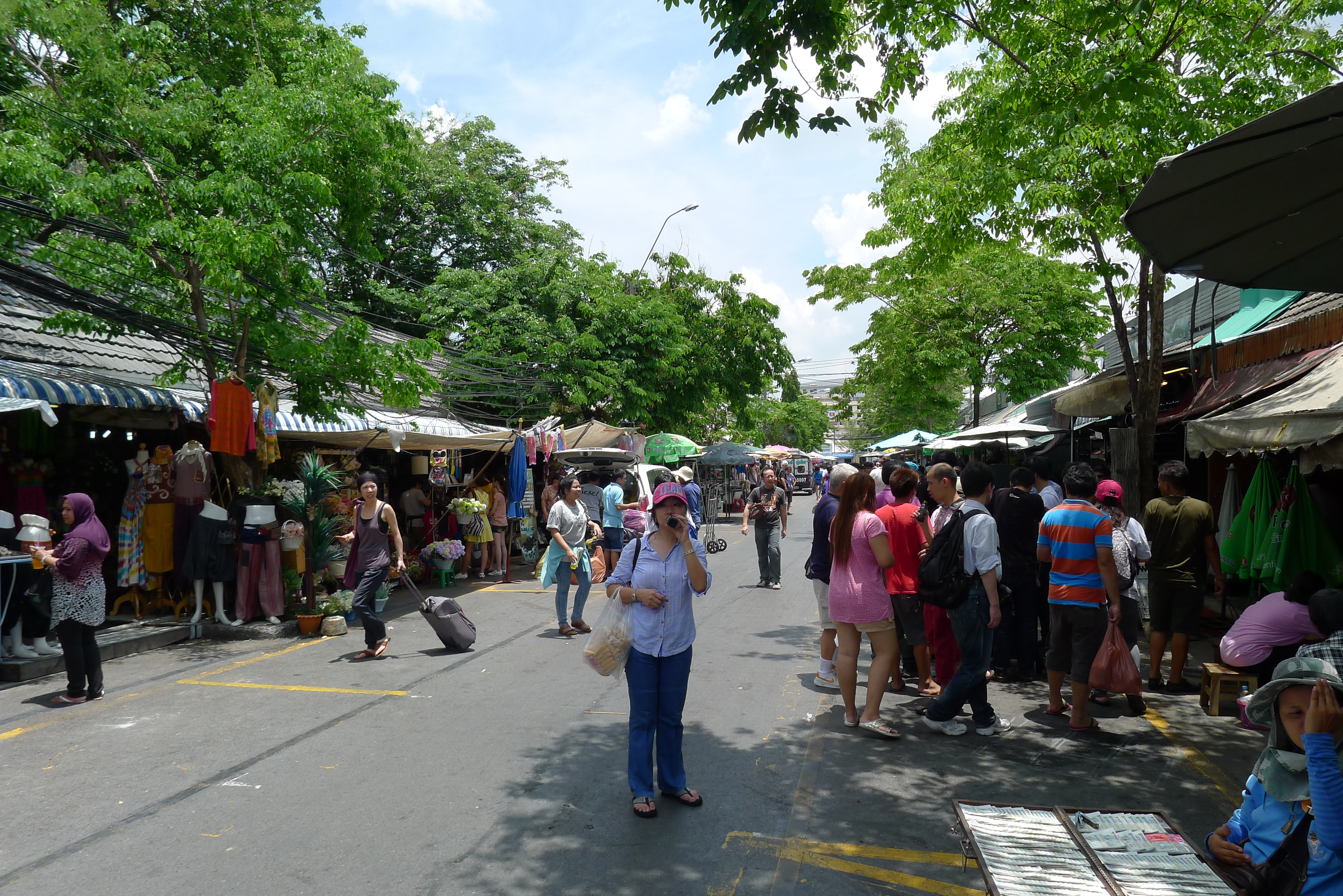
- Chatuchak Weekend Market on a Saturday afternoon.
- Location: Chatuchak, Bangkok
- Website: Chatuchakmarket.org
- Interactive map of Chatuchak Weekend Market

The Chatuchak Weekend Market (Thai: ตลาดนัดจตุจักร, RTGS: Talatnat Chatuchak), on Kamphaeng Phet 2 Road, Chatuchak, Bangkok, is the largest market in Thailand. Afectionately known as JJ Market, it has more than 15,000 stalls and 11,505 vendors (2019), divided into 27 sections. Chatuchak Market sells many different kinds of goods, including plants, antiques, consumer electronics, cosmetics, pets, fresh and dry food and drinks, ceramics, furniture and home accessories, clothing, and books. It is the world's largest and most diverse weekend market, with over 200,000 visitors every weekend.

== History ==
Chatuchak Market has been open since 1942. In 1948, Prime Minister Plaek Phibunsongkhram had a policy that every province was required to have its own market. Bangkok chose Sanam Luang as the market site. After a few months, the government moved the market to Sanam Chai. The market moved back to Sanam Luang in 1958.

Starting in 1975, General Kriangsak Chamanan had the policy of using Sanam Luang as a place of recreational activity for the populace which would also be used for commemorating ceremony. As General Kriangsak Chamanan was the chairman of State Railway of Thailand at that time, he thus permitted the use of land on the south side of Chatuchak Park as a market. His plan was to recycle waste from the looming Din Daeng Garbage Mountain which had stacked up over decades to use as landfills, and he recruited military engineers for the job. The park was fully completed in 1978, when Chomanan became prime minister. By 1983, all of the merchants had moved to Chatuchak. At that time the market was called Phahonyothin Market. In 1987, its name was changed to Chatuchak Market.

The clock tower is a distinctive landmark in the Chatuchuk Market. It was built in 1987 on the occasion of King Bhumibol Adulyadej's 60th birthday, a cooperative effort of the market administration and Thai-Chinese Merchant Association. In June 2024, a fire broke out in the ornamental fish zone in Srisomrat Market, affectionately known as Sunday Market, adjacent to the bigger Chatuchak market, burning out 118 sales stalls, killing some 1,000 animals including snakes, spiders and Siamese fighting fish.

== Economics ==
Monthly stall rent for vendors at the market ranges from 10,600 to 17,700 baht. A University of the Thai Chamber of Commerce study found that most merchants have been selling at the weekend market for four to six years and have an average sales revenue of 139,500 baht per month.

== Trade in illegal wildlife ==
Studies have shown that the Chatuchak Market is a centre for illegal trade in endangered wildlife. In a survey conducted in 2015, researchers counted 1,271 birds of 117 species for sale in 45 shops or stalls. Of the total, nine species were listed as "Threatened" on the IUCN Red List and eight species as "Near Threatened".

== Sections ==
- Clothing and accessories (sections 2–6, 10–26)
- Handicrafts (sections 8–11)
- Ceramics (sections 11, 13, 15, 17, 19, 25)
- Furniture and home decor (sections 1,3,4,7,8)
- Food and beverage (sections 2, 3, 4, 23, 24, 26, 27)
- Plants and gardening (sections 3, 4)
- Art and galleries (section 7)
- Pets and accessories (sections 8, 9, 11, 13)
- Books (sections 1, 27)
- Antiques and collectibles (sections 1, 26)
- Miscellaneous and used clothing (sections 2, 3, 4, 5, 6, 22, 25, 26)

== Transport ==
The market is served by the Kamphaeng Phet Road and is served by the Kamphaeng Phet (western end) and Chatuchak Park stations (eastern end) on the MRT Blue Line. The eastern end of the market is also served by Mo Chit BTS station on the Sukhumvit Line.

== Gallery ==
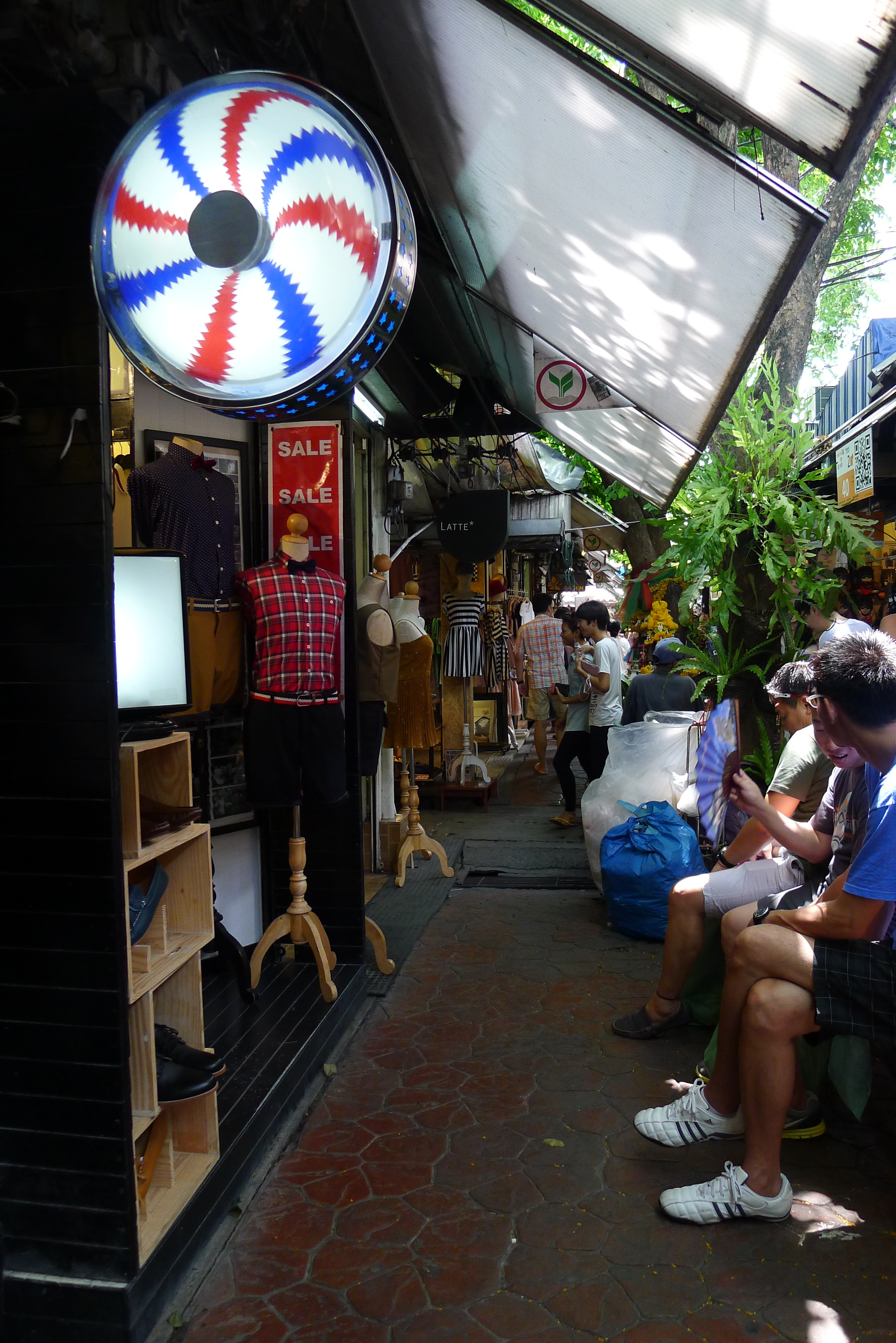
One of its many small aisles, Chatuchak Market

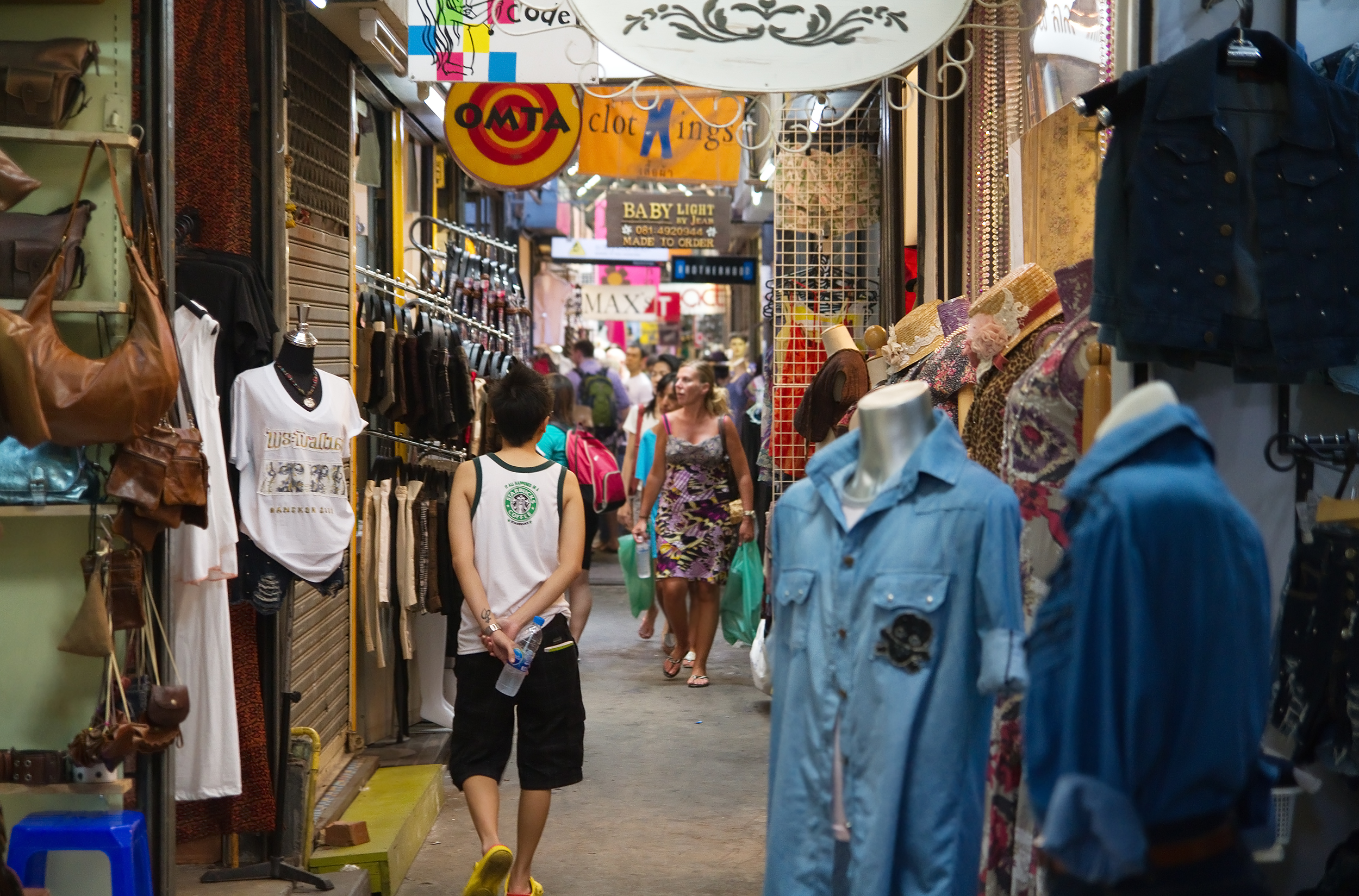
A narrow aisle, Chatuchak Market

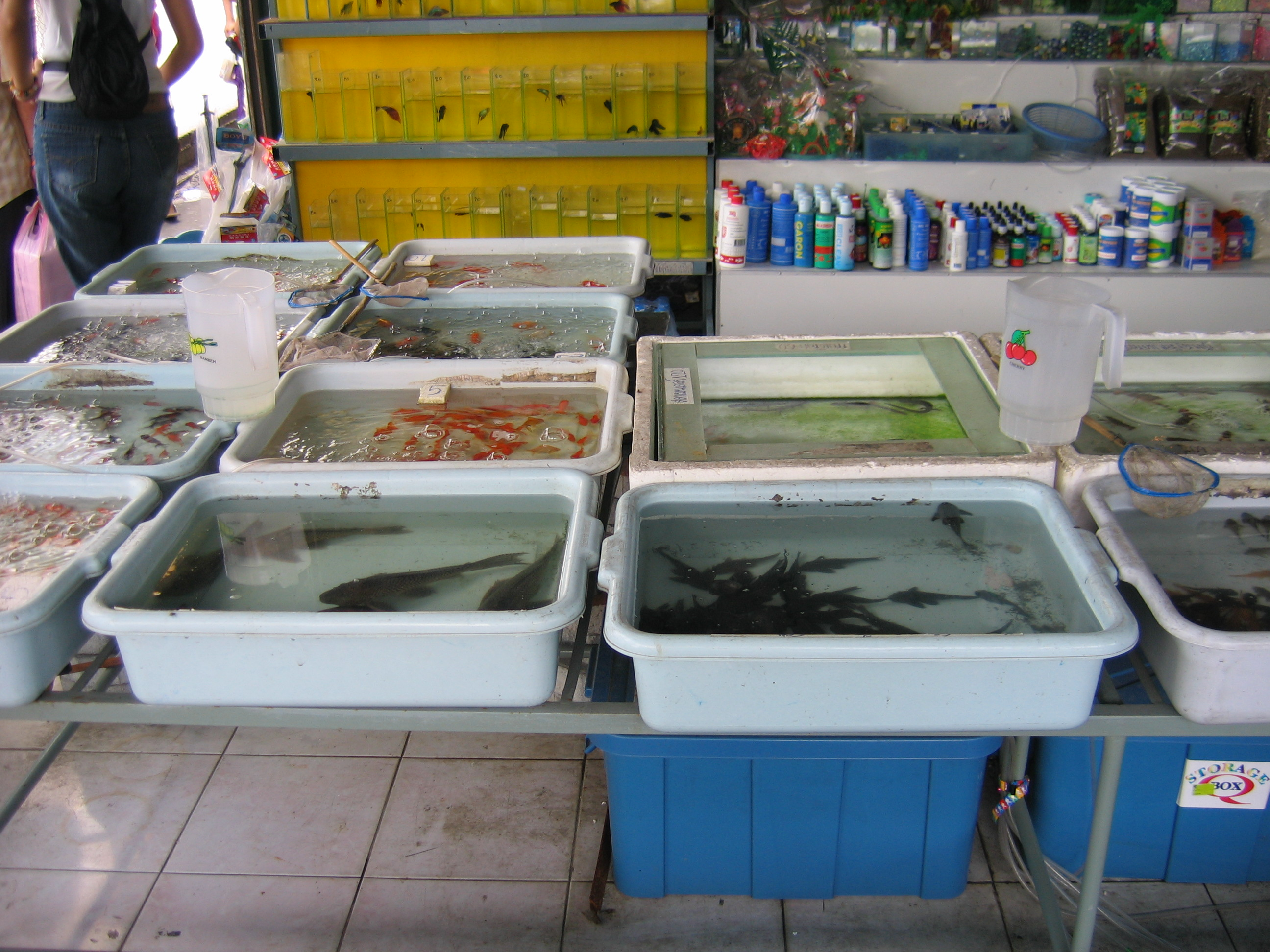
Fish for sale, Chatuchak Market

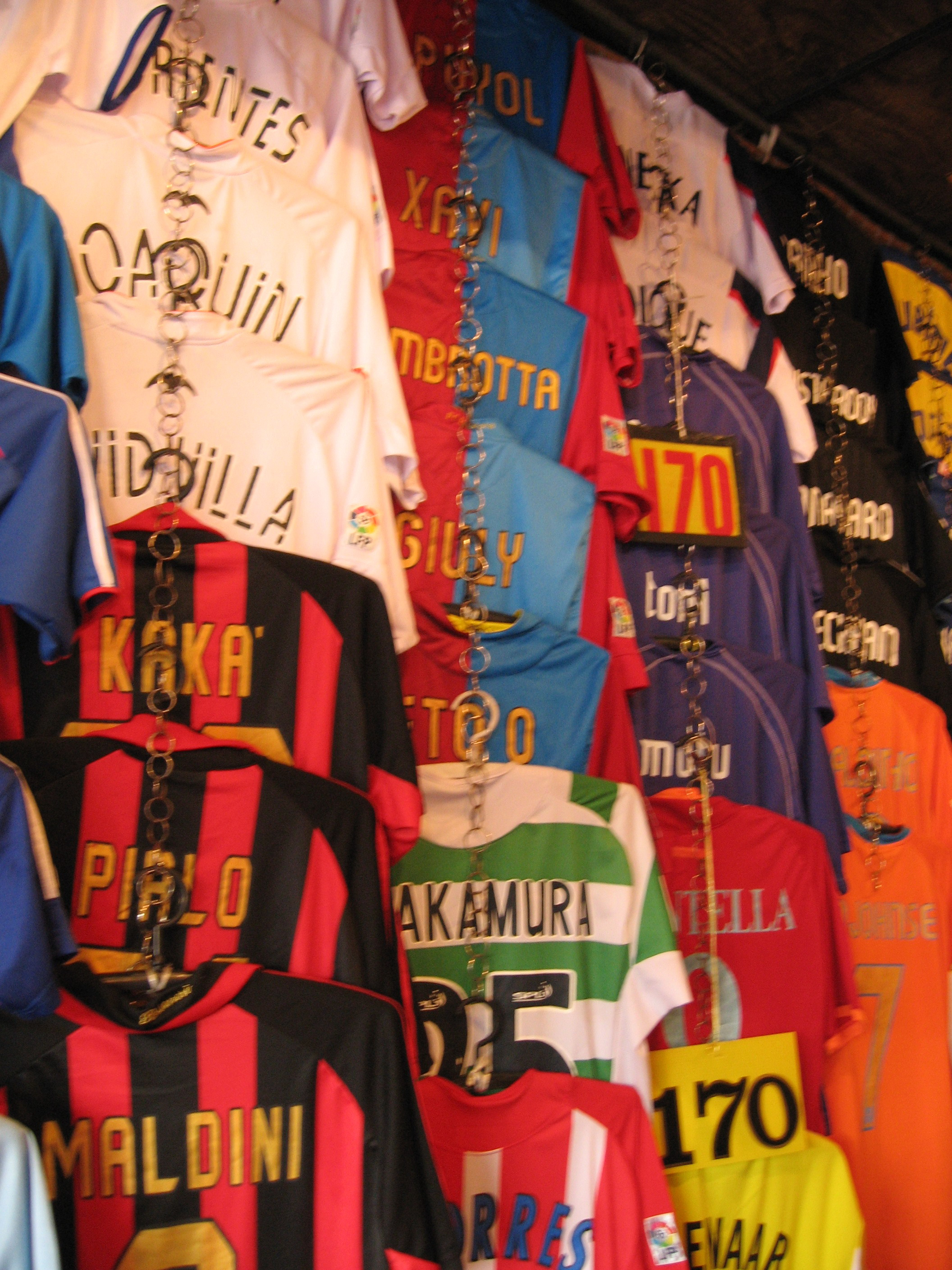
Fake football shirts, Chatuchak Market

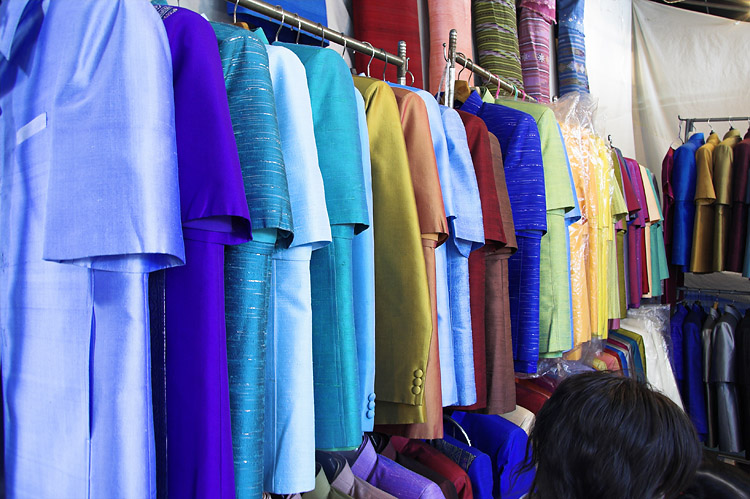
Thai silk, Chatuchak Market

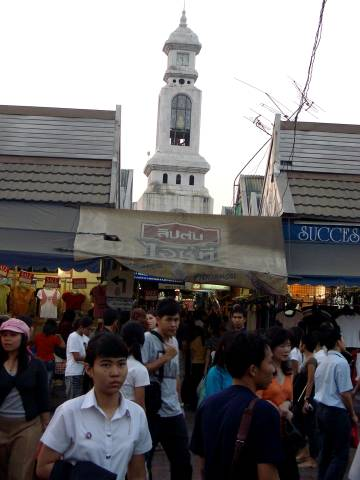
Clock tower, Chatuchak Market

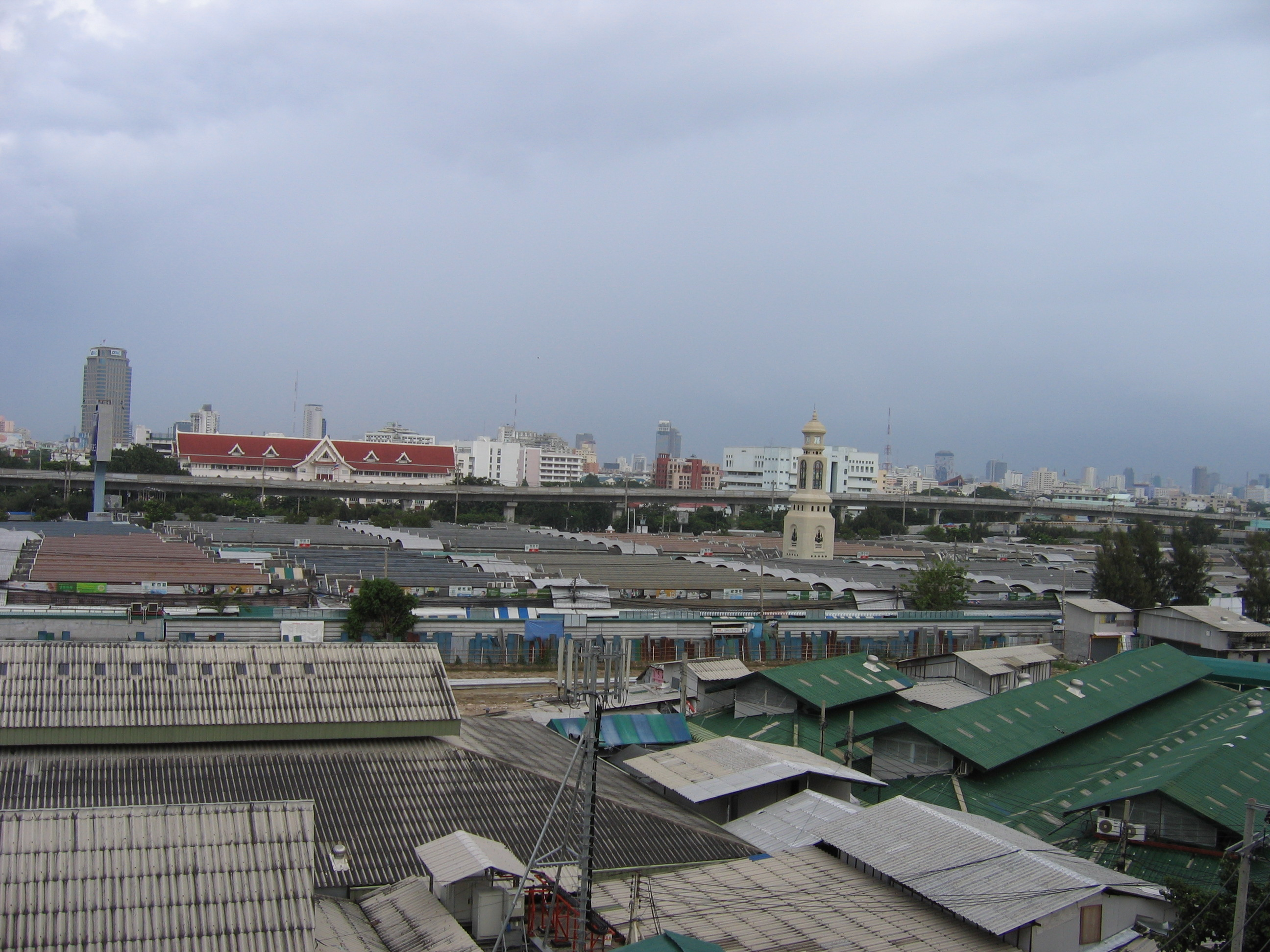
Central clock tower, Chatuchak Market

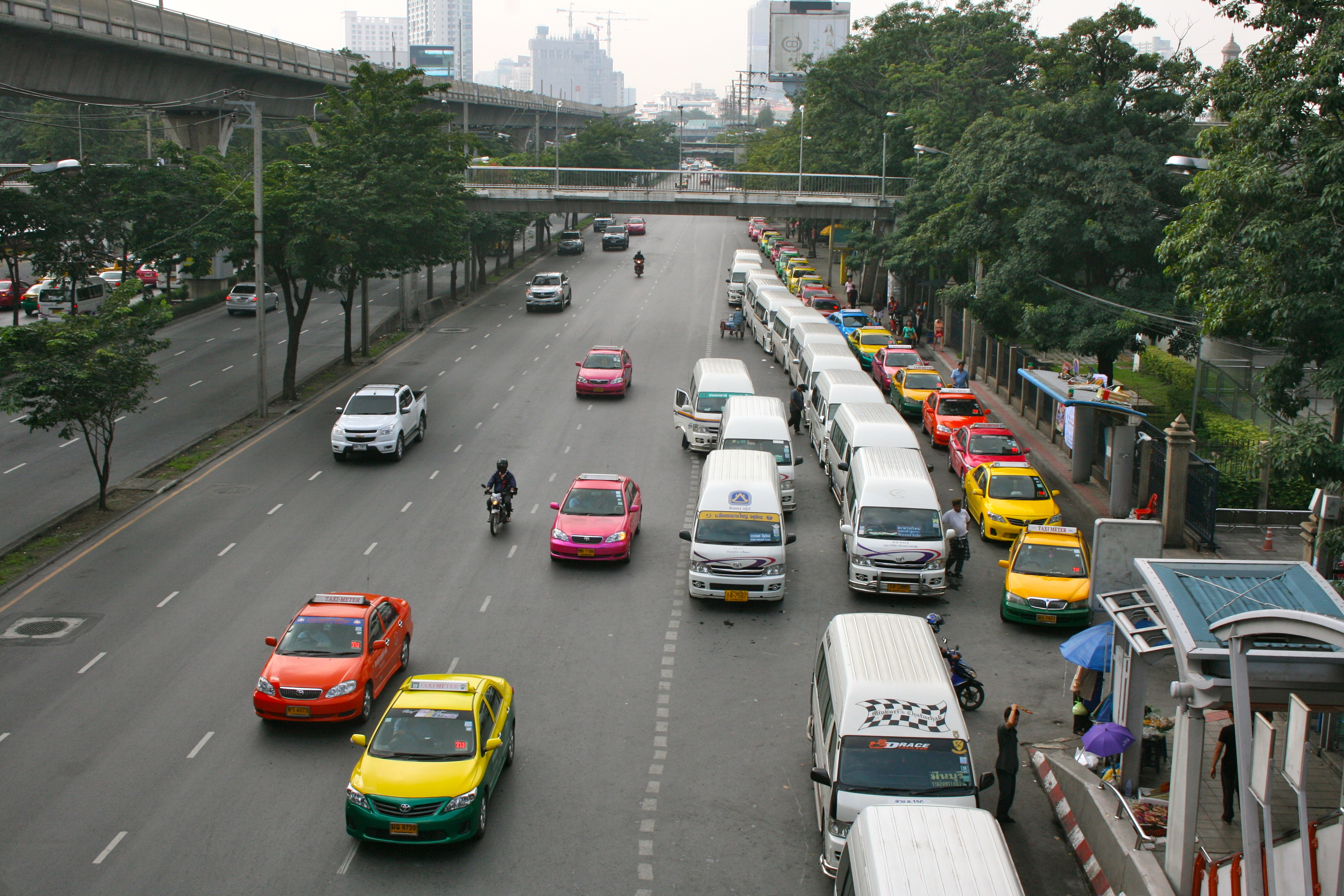
Taxi and minibus queue, Chatuchak Market
