= Kamphaeng Phet MRT station =

MRT station on Blue Line in Bangkok, Thailand

กำแพงเพชร BL12 Kamphaeng Phet
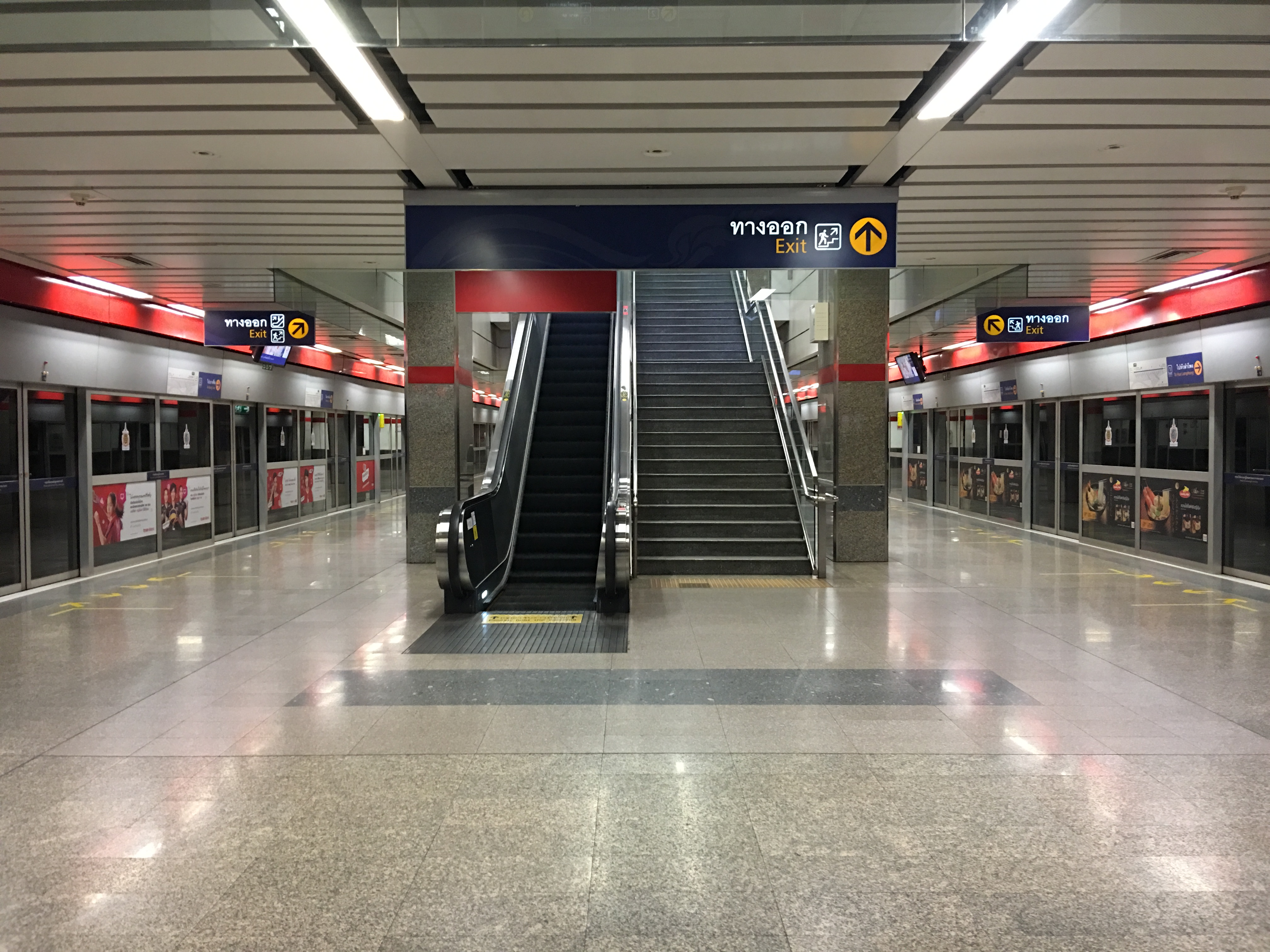

General information
- Location: Chatuchak District, Bangkok, Thailand
- Coordinates: 13°47′52″N 100°32′54″E
- System: MRT
- Owner: Mass Rapid Transit Authority of Thailand (MRTA)
- Operator: Bangkok Expressway and Metro Public Company Limited (BEM)
- Line: MRT Blue Line
- Platforms: 1 island platform
- Tracks: 2

Construction
- Structure type: Underground
- Accessible: yes

Other information
- Station code: BL12

History
- Opened: 3 July 2004; 22 years ago

Passengers
- 2021: 1,164,679

Services
| Preceding station | Metropolitan Rapid Transit | Following station |
|---|---|---|
| Chatuchak Park towards Lak Song | Blue Line | Bang Sue towards Tha Phra via Bang Sue |
Location

Kamphaeng Phet station (Thai: สถานีกำแพงเพชร, pronounced [sā.tʰǎː.nīː kām.pʰɛ̄ːŋ pʰét]) is a Bangkok MRT station on the Blue Line in Bangkok, Thailand. It is beneath Kamphaeng Phet Road (Thanon), providing a direct access to the Chatuchak Weekend Market and Or Tor Kor Market. Not to be confused with the town or province of Kamphaeng Phet. An underground mall opened here in early 2009.

The preceding station is Bang Sue station and next station is Chatuchak Park.

The road is named after Purachatra Jayakara, Prince of Kamphaeng Phet (Thai, พระเจ้าบรมวงศ์เธอ พระองค์เจ้าบุรฉัตรไชยากร กรมพระกำแพงเพชรอัครโยธิน), the first Thai commander of State Railway of Thailand.

== Station layout ==
| G | - | Bus stop |
| B1 | Basement | Exits 1–3, MetroMall |
| B2 | Concourse | Ticket machines |
| B3 | Platform 2 | Blue towards Tha Phra (Bang Sue) |
| B3 | Island platform, doors will open on the right |
| B3 | Platform 1 | Blue towards Lak Song (Chatuchak Park) |
