= Chak Phupha Su Maha Nathee Park =

Park in Bangkok, Thailand

- Interactive map of Chak Phupha Su Maha Nathee Park
- Type: Urban Park
- Location: Kamphaeng Phet 3 Road, Chatuchak, Bangkok, Thailand
- Coordinates: 13°48′22.04″N 100°33′8″E
- Area: 4.16 hectares (10.3 acres)
- Created: 25 February 2025
- Operator: Bangkok Metropolitan Administration (BMA)
- Open: From 5:00 to 19:00

Chak Phupha Su Maha Nathee Park (Thai: สวนจากภูผาสู่มหานที, RTGS: Suan Chak Phu Pha Su Maha Nathi, pronounced [sǔa̯n t͡ɕàːk pʰūːpʰǎː sùː máhǎːnáːtʰīː]) is the newest and smallest of the four parks in the Chatuchak Park complex, covering an area of 26 rai (0.04 km2). Situated adjacent to the northeastern side of Queen Sirikit Park, it serves as a natural extension that is seamlessly connected and accessible on foot. The park is also connected to the nearby Wachirabenchathat Park (commonly known as Suan Rot Fai), allowing visitors access to a continuous green space across all three parks. It is also located across Kamphaeng Phet 3 Road from Chatuchak Park, making it easily accessible from all directions.

Constructed on the former site of JJ Green Market, the park was created to honour King Vajiralongkorn (Rama X) on the auspicious occasion of his 72nd birthday on 28 July 2024, marking the completion of his sixth 12-year cycle.

"Chak Phupha" translates to "from the mountain", and "Su Maha Nathee" means "to the great water". The name alludes to the journeys of Queen Sirikit as she accompanied King Bhumibol Adulyadej (Rama IX) on visits to the Thai people in every region of the country, from the northern highlands to the southern coast. While King Bhumibol focused his efforts on developing water resources and improving agricultural conditions, Queen Sirikit turned her attention toward forest preservation and reforestation. This included efforts to restore the vitality of the environment through the renewal of forested areas.

King Vajiralongkorn and Queen Suthida formally inaugurated the park on 25 February 2025 by planting a pair of yellow star trees as a living memorial. On the same day, 172 royal koi fish were released into the park's main pond. The fish are of six varieties: Kōhaku, Aka Matsuba, Ki Utsuri, Benigoi, Karashigoi, and Karashi Koyo.

Another major feature of the park is the 20 m (65.6 ft) steel observation tower, known as the Bird Watching Tower, which offers panoramic views across the surrounding green spaces.
