= Mo Chit 2 Bus Terminal =

Bus station in Bangkok, Thailand

Mo Chit 2 bus terminal หมอชิตใหม่, หมอชิต 2
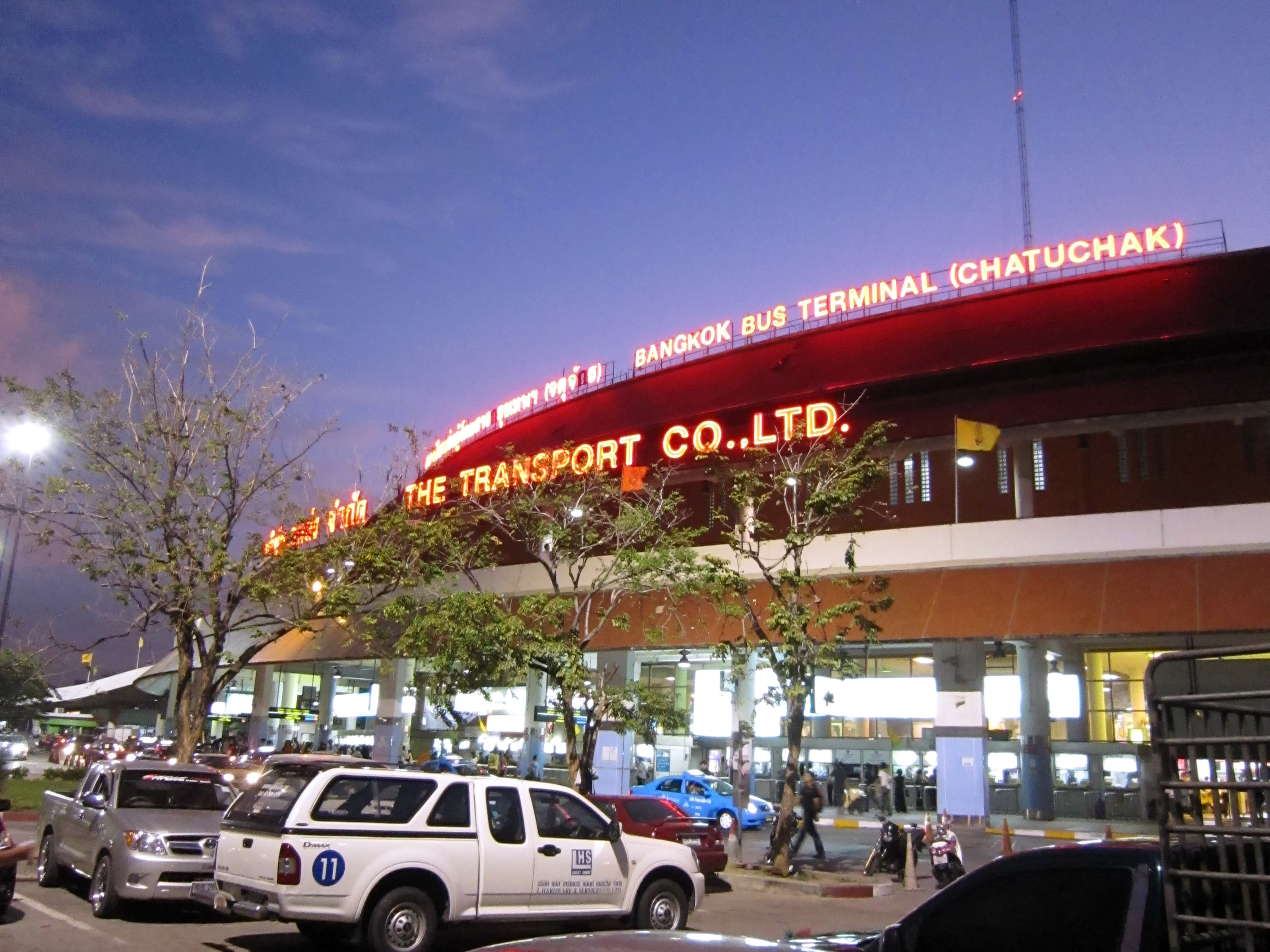

General information
- Other names: Bangkok Bus Terminal (Chatuchak), New Mo Chit
- Location: Kamphaeng Phet 2 Road, Lat Yao, Chatuchak, Bangkok; Thailand
- Coordinates: 13.8138609°N 100.5496779°E
- Owner: Department of Land Transport (Thailand), Ministry of Transport (Thailand)
- Bus routes: Northern, Central, Esan
- Bus operators: The Transport Company, Ltd.
- Connections: BMTA bus route number 3, 16, 49, 77, 96, 104, 134, 136, 138, 145, 157, 170, 509, 517, 529, and 536

Construction
- Parking: Yes
- Accessible: Yes

History
- Opened: 8 April 1998; 28 years ago
Location

The Bangkok Bus Terminal (Chatuchak), colloquially known as Mo Chit 2 (Thai: หมอชิต 2) or New Mo Chit, is one of the three main long-distance bus stations serving Greater Bangkok. (Note: The other two being Ekkamai Bus Terminal and New Southern Bus Terminal.) It is operated by the state enterprise The Transport Co., Ltd., and serves as the main gateway to and from the northern and northeastern provinces for those travelling by bus.

The station is located on Kamphaeng Phet 2 Road in Bangkok's Chatuchak District, near Queen Sirikit Park. It began operations on 8 April 1998, replacing the old Mo Chit Bus Terminal, whose location was being converted for the construction of the main BTS Skytrain depot. The station serves as many as 150,000 daily passengers, especially during the peak New Year and Songkran seasons.

The Mo Chit 2 station has a total area of around 100,000 square meters. The terminal can handle over 150,000 passengers monthly and about 5,000 dailies. There are arrival and departures terminals, divided into 4 levels. In the terminal, it has waiting areas, food courts, shops, and more, with air conditioning.

The station was originally planned as a temporary station, with a new station planned over the BTS depot, following a 1994 cabinet resolution. However, legal complications prevented the original plan from being completed. By the 2010s, the station faced relocation to make way for facilities of the new Krung Thep Aphiwat Central Terminal of the State Railway of Thailand, who owns the land. Multiple options were considered, including reviving the original plan, moving to the Rangsit area, and building a new bus terminal near the present area, with tentative plans changing many times.

== History ==
The head of the ministry of transport Winai Somphong (Thai: พันเอกวินัย สมพงษ์) and Krisda Arunvongse na Ayudhya (Thai: กฤษฎา อรุณวงษ์ ณ อยุธยา) asked for cooperation from Department of Land Transport (DLT) and The Transport Company Limited to refurbish the old Mochit station as a parking lot and Train maintenance workshop for BTS Skytrain.

As Bangkok grew and along with it public transit services, the old Mochit station also began to need improvement and development in the form of a new bus station, resulting in the creation of a new Mo Chit 2 bus terminal.

On 8 April 1998, The Transport Company Limited introduced the Mo Chit 2 bus terminal, known as Mochit 2, located at 999 Kampaengphet 2 Road, Chatuchak. The Transport Company Limited rented the area from the owner State Railway of Thailand (SRT). Their Headquarters and passenger terminal moved to a massive 4-story, 27,000-square-meter building, designed for passenger safety and convenience.

In 2025, The Ministry of Transport is considering moving all three main long-distance bus terminals to Krung Thep Aphiwat Central Terminal.

=== Conflicts ===
On June 2, 2017, during a meeting for the construction project of the Krung Thep Aphiwat Central Terminal, it was resolved that The Transport Company Limited (Thailand) would relocate the Mo Chit 2 bus terminal back to its original location. According to the policy and plan of the Ministry of Transport, Mo Chit 2 bus terminal area must be returned to State Railway of Thailand by 2026 in order to develop the area into a smart city under the Phaholyothin Transportation Center project. Therefore, the bus terminal will have to move to the Treasury Department's lease area near the BTS maintenance center (the old Mo Chit).

However, the Board of Directors and The Transport Company's manager had an agreement that the use of the current area is more appropriate. This decision was based on the convenience for travelers to catch a bus from the Bangkok Mass Transit Authority (BMTA) bus garage and the ease of connecting with the shuttle bus system to Bang Sue Central Station, which will serve as the center of the suburban train system, Skytrain, and high-speed train system in the future.

== Location ==
Mo Chit 2 bus terminal’s location is in Chatuchak District. The easy ways to go to the terminal are by Transit Bus, BTS (The Bangkok Mass Transit System), MRT (Mass Rapid Transit), and SRT Dark Red Line (SRT Red Line Suburban Railway System).

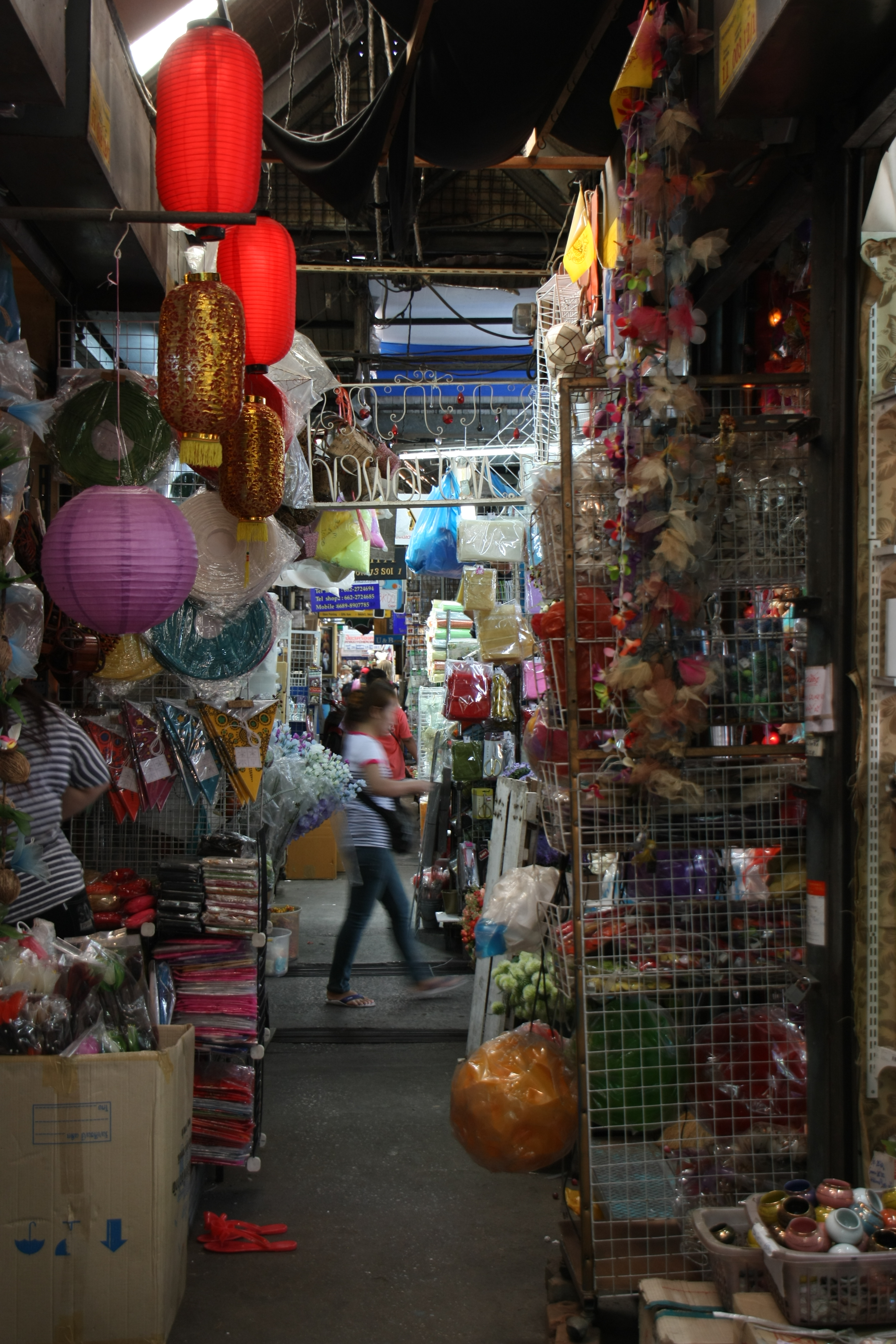
Chatuchak Weekend Market

The nearest BTS and MRT with SRT stations are:

- Mochit BTS Station (Exit number 1 and number 2)
- Chatuchak Park MRT Station (Exit number 1, number 2, and number 3)
- Chatuchak Station (Exit number 6)

Travelling from Mochit BTS Station or Chatuchak Park MRT station to Mo Chit 2 bus terminal can be accomplished by Taxis, local buses, motorcycle taxi or walking. It is approximately 2 kilometers far from both stations. For local buses that pass the stations, there are bus route number 3 and 77, at Chatuchak park side, and number 3, 5, 16, 49, 96, 104, 134, 136, 138, 145, 204, and 529 at parking lot side that people can catch to the Mo Chit 2 bus terminal.

To travel by local buses only, Bus route number 3, 5, 16, 49, 77, 96, 104, 134, 136, 138, 145, 204, 157, 170, 509, 517, 529, 536 and A1 are the available buses that passed the Mo Chit 2 bus terminal directly. Passenger or tourists don't have to transfer to another bus, BTS, or MRT.

=== Nearby places ===
As in Chatuchak District, there are many popular activities for visitors and locals. Flea & Street Markets at Chatuchak Market are one of the most popular places. Visitors can shop for clothing, food, and various items, dine at restaurants or street food stalls, order customized desserts relax in designated areas, and even enjoy special events like the Chatuchak Weekend Market. J.J mall, Union mall, and Central Ladprao are the shopping centers near the bus terminal. These shopping centers are very popular with the local population.

== Layout & Services ==
=== Layout ===
Bangkok Bus Terminal has a total area of 116,368 square meters. Mo Chit 2 bus terminal has distinct sections for arrivals and departures, surrounded by both sides of Kamphaeng Phet 2 Road. It is located adjacent to the State Railway of Thailand (SRT) compound, behind the Queen Sirikit Park. The passenger terminal is divided into 4 levels according to routes: Floors 1, 2, 3, and 4. First floor is for Northern, Central, and Eastern Thailand ticket booth and travelling. Second and fourth floor is the Transport Company Limited's office. Third Floor is for Northern Eastern Thailand or Isan ticket booth and travelling. The building is equipped with air conditioning throughout and utilizes a Flow-Through passenger ticket distribution system, allowing passengers to exit directly. There are 4 elevators and 2 sets of stairs, along with emergency fire escape staircases. The taxi service operates with three pickup points for hired taxis: One for arrivals and two for departures, ensuring 24-hour security.

=== Services ===
Mo Chit 2 bus terminal is an air-conditioned bus station with a waiting area. The central area of the waiting zone features an information booth that can guide you to the appropriate ticket counters and provide details on schedules and platforms. There are food courts and shops on both the first and third floors selling food, snacks, and beverages. The ticket counters are on the first floor serving northern routes, while the third-floor counters take care of Northern Eastern Thailand and long-distance travel. Luggage storage is also on the third floor near the food court entrance serving from 5 a.m to 10 p.m. Additionally, there are multiple 7-Eleven convenience stores and a Mini Mart on the first floor, along with a small shop and massage & spa center close to the departure area for added convenience.
