= Sun Towers =

Suntowers
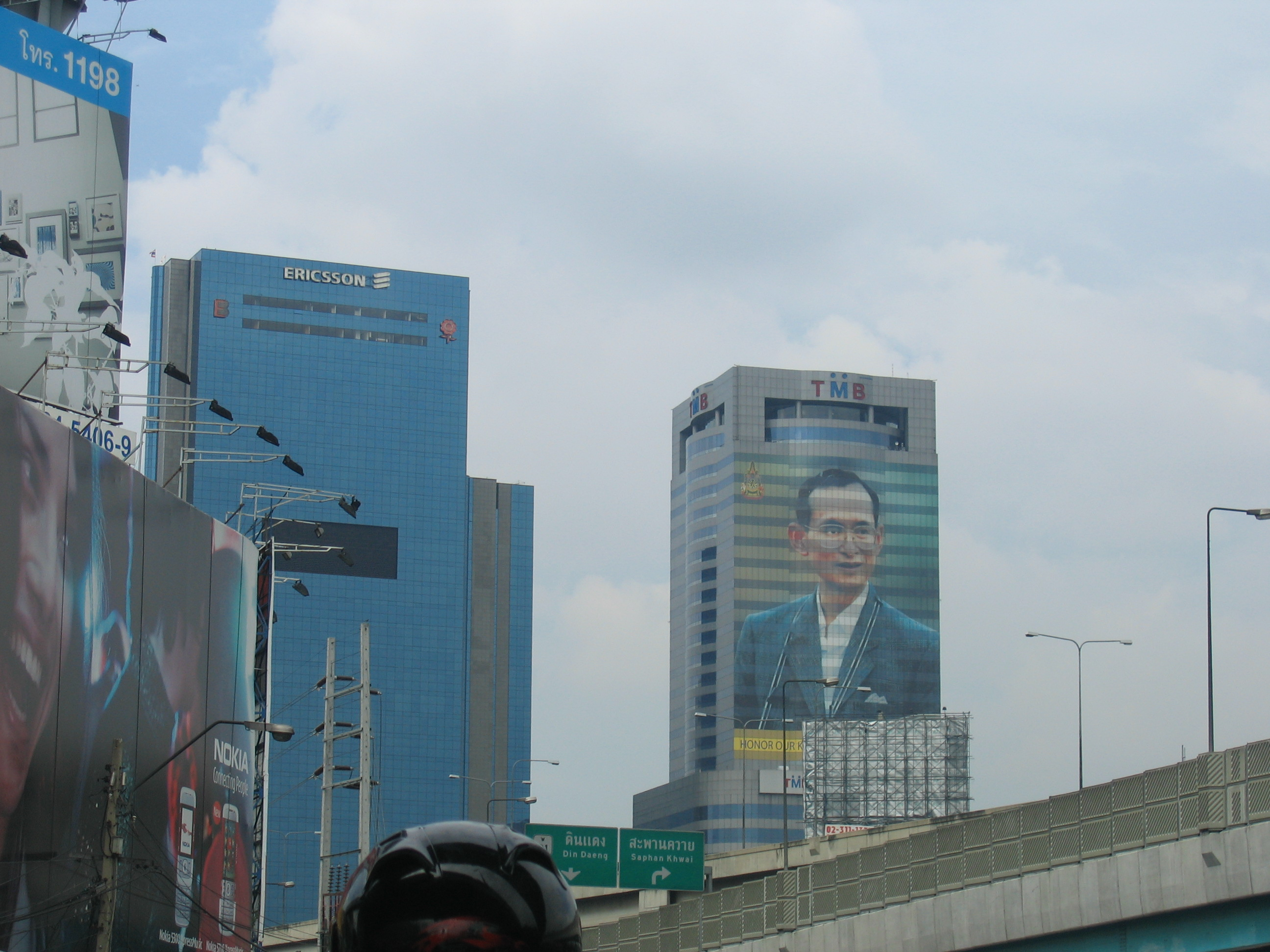
- Suntowers
- Interactive map of the Suntowers area

General information
- Status: Completed
- Location: Chatuchak, Bangkok, Thailand
- Coordinates: 13.8083°N 100.5589°E
- Completed: 1994

Height
- Top floor: 45

Technical details
- Floor count: 42

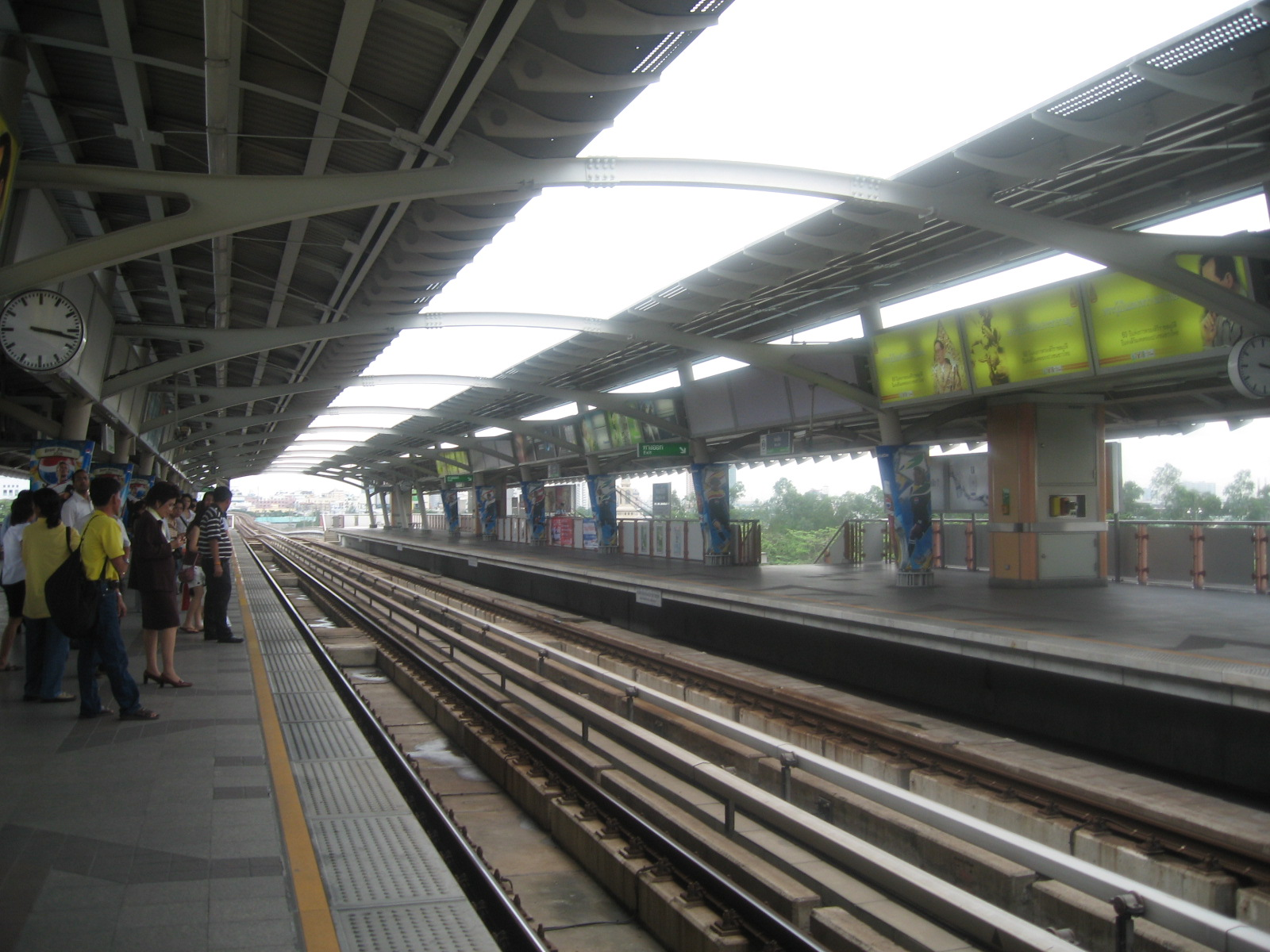
Mo Chit station

Suntowers is a high-rise building complex in the Chatuchak District, Bangkok, Thailand. The complex consists of Tower A, Ericsson headquarters (40 floors), and Tower B (32 floors)

== Transportation ==
- Mo Chit Station (Sukhumvit Line of the BTS Skytrain)
- The planned Ha Yaek Lat Phrao Station of the northern BTS extension will be the closest station when built.
- Chatuchak Park MRT station, MRT Blue Line

== Nearby ==
- Union Mall
- Chatuchak Park
- Chatuchak weekend market
- Central Plaza Lat Phrao
- JJ Mall
