= Mo Chit =

Mo Chit may refer to:

- Old Mo Chit Bus Terminal, a former bus station in Bangkok
- Mo Chit 2 bus terminal, officially the Bangkok Bus Terminal (Chatuchak), the current bus station which succeeded Mo Chit
- Mo Chit BTS Station, a station of the BTS Skytrain
