= Kamphaeng Phet Road =

Road in Bangkok, Thailand

Coordinates: 13.797939°N 100.551114°E

National Highway 3508
- ทางหลวงแผ่นดินหมายเลข 3508
- ถนนกำแพงเพชร 6, ถนนโลคัลโรด; Kamphaeng Phet 6 Road, Local Road

Route information
- Length: 4.3 km (2.7 mi)
- Existed: 1978–present

Major junctions
- South end: Kamphaeng Phet 6 Road in Don Mueang (Bangkok)
- North end: Hwy 346 in Rangsit, Pathum Thani province

Location
- Country: Thailand
- Provinces: Bangkok, Pathumthani
- Major cities: Bangkok, Rangsit

Highway system
- Highways in Thailand; Motorways; Asian Highways

Kamphaeng Phet Road (Thai: ถนนกำแพงเพชร, RTGS: Thanon Kamphaeng Phet, pronounced [tʰā.nǒn kām.pʰɛ̄ːŋ pʰét]) is a road in Thailand's capital Bangkok, there are currently eight branches. The road is a site of MRT Blue Line station Kamphaeng Phet.

== History ==
The road was constructed in the year 1978 by Bangkok Metropolitan Administration (BMA) to connect Phaholyothin Road with Yan Phaholyothin Road and received construction assistance from the Military Battalion, 111th Mechanic, 11th Military Department of Ratchaburi Province.

Due to the road run through the land of the State Railway of Thailand (SRT), therefore used the name "Kamphaeng Phet Road" in honour of Purachatra Jayakara, Prince of Kamphaeng Phet. Who was the first commander of Royal State Railways of Siam (now State Railway of Thailand), and regarded as Father of the Thai railways.

== Branches ==
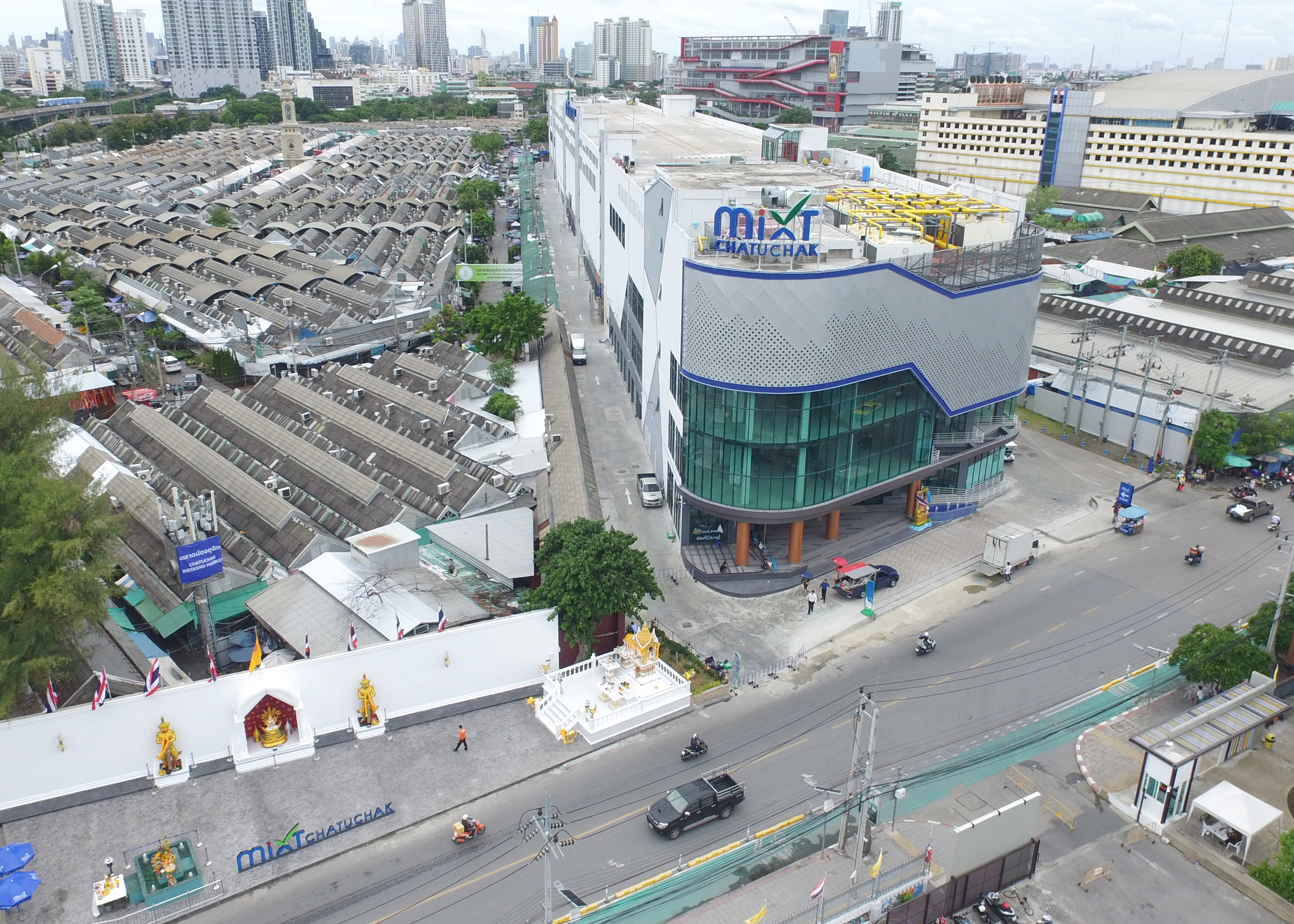
Kamphaeng Phet 4 Road passing in front of Mixt Chatuchak

- Kamphaeng Phet Road (ถนนกำแพงเพชร) – starting from Kamphaeng Phet Junction, where it cuts with Phaholyothin Road at the southeast corner of Chatuchak Weekend Market to the west ending at Rama VI Road in the area of Phahonyothin freight yard near present Bang Sue Grand Station, this road formerly known as Yan Phaholyothin Road.
- Kamphaeng Phet 1 Road (ถนนกำแพงเพชร 1) – is the road runs parallel to Phahonyothin Road outbound from the starting point of Kamphaeng Phet Road to meet with Vibhavadi Rangsit Road at Lat Phrao Square.
- Kamphaeng Phet 2 Road (ถนนกำแพงเพชร 2) – separate itself from Kamphaeng Phet Road in front of the Or Tor Kor (OTK) Market, pass in front of JJ Mall and Bangkok Bus Terminal (Chatuchak), also known as Mo Chit 2 to meet Ratchadaphisek Road at Ratchavipha Interchange.

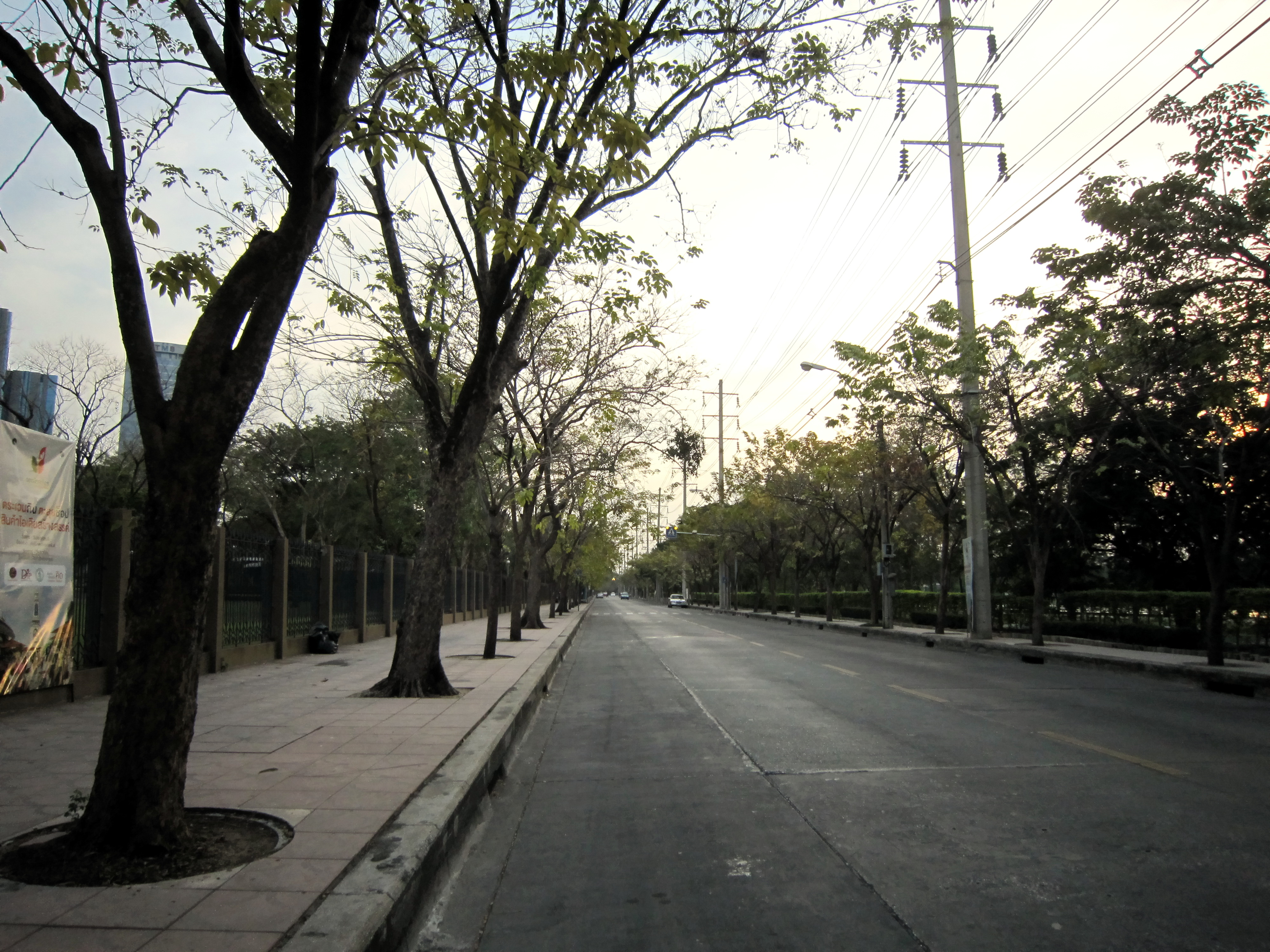
Kamphaeng Phet 3 on New Year's Eve 2010

- Kamphaeng Phet 3 Road (ถนนกำแพงเพชร 3) – is the road linking Kamphaeng Phet 1 Road and Vibhavadi Rangsit Road. The road also known as "Lang Suan Chatuchak Road" (ถนนหลังสวนจตุจักร, "behind Chatuchak park road"), because it passes through rear of Chatuchak Park and ends at Vibhavadi Rangsit Road near the entrance of Vachirabenjatas Park, or colloquially known as Rot Fai Park. BMA once had a project to disable this road to combine the three parks together, Chatuchak Park, Queen Sirikit Park, and Vachirabenjatas Park under the name "Chatuchak Metro Park" (อุทยานสวนจตุจักร).
- Kamphaeng Phet 4 Road (ถนนกำแพงเพชร 4) – the shortest road among Kamphaeng Phet Series Roads, linking Kamphaeng Phet 2 Road and Kamphaeng Phet 3 Road in front of Queen Sirikit Park, Bangkok Children's Discovery Museum, and Mixt Chatuchak.
- Kamphaeng Phet 5 Road (ถนนกำแพงเพชร 5) – is the road along the railway line parallel to Sawankhalok Road, starting from Rama VI Road in Chitralada Wye area. The road along the railway went north to meet with Rama VI Road in the area of the Phahonyothin freight yard. This road also passes through Sam Sen railway station, which is parallel to the entire length of the Thoet Damri Road.
- Kamphaeng Phet 6 Road (ถนนกำแพงเพชร 6) – the longest road among Kamphaeng Phet Series Roads. It is the road along the Northern and Northeastern Railway Lines, starting from Kamphaeng Phet 2 Road beside Bangkok Bus Terminal (Chatuchak) northward passing in front of Wat Samian Nari, before ends at Rangsit Station (RSI) in Rangsit area Thanyaburi District, Pathum Thani Province. This road also known as "Local Road" (ถนนโลคัลโรด), and part in Pathum Thani Province, it will belong to the Department of Highways as "Highway 3508" (ทางหลวงแผ่นดินหมายเลข 3508), the specific distance in Pathum Thani Province is 4.3 km (2.7 mi).
- Kamphaeng Phet 7 Road (ถนนกำแพงเพชร 7) – is the road along the Eastern Railway Line on the north side, parallel to New Petchburi Road (which is parallel to the railway on the south side).
