= Timeline of the 2020–2021 Thai protests (November 2020) =

External videos
- Clip of unknown person throwing explosive at rally 25 November 2020, Twitter video

On 1 November, an estimate of over 10,000 yellow-shirted royalists demonstrated their support for the King at the Grand Palace, where he had participated in a religious ceremony at the Temple of the Emerald Buddha.

On 2 November, an unknown person threw a firecracker at a protest rally in Bangkok.

On 3 November, a demonstration was held at the Ministry of Digital Economy and Society to protest a block of the Pornhub website. Some netizens questioned if the ban was because the site hosted some compromising material of the royal family, including the king. On 7 November in Bangkok, over 1,000 members of the LGBT community and anti-government protesters gathered for a Pride Parade to request equal rights along with other demands.

On 8 November, an estimated 7,000–10,000 protesters marched from Democracy Monument to the Grand Palace to deliver their letters to the King. The protesters insisted that their demand to reform the monarchy is already the best compromise they could offer. Prior to the rally, more than 9,000 police officers had been deployed. The gathering was largely peaceful, but the police employed water cannons for the second time during the months-long protests. Though brief, the incident caused five injuries, including one police officer, according to the capital's emergency medical center. The protesters' letters were left outside for the Bureau of the Royal Household to collect. In the aftermath, the authorities released a picture of a protester throwing "what appeared to be a fiery object" at the police, in an attempt to paint the movement as violent, but the protester said that it was a smoke bomb.

On 9 November, a protester assaulted a Russian expat in Pattaya, and accused him of calling the protesters as "trash."

On 10 November, Prayut urged calm from "all sides" and stated that the government was not "taking sides". Many pro-democracy activists had been arrested while being involved in protests, but no known arrests had been made during royalist demonstrations.

On 14 November, around 20 protesting groups ranging from high school, women rights to LGBTQ activists in an event called "Mob Fest". One event resulted in a covering of Democracy Monument with cloth, and a small clash with the police and resulting in a leg injury of an officer. The following day, protests resumed in Chiang Mai after a lull over the past month while students were taking exams.

On 17 November, the Senate and House of Representatives began a two-day joint session to consider changes to the constitution. That day, at least 55 people were hurt when protesters near Parliament clashed with the police and yellow-shirted royalists. Police fired tear gas and water cannon at the crowd. Six people suffered gunshot wounds. A pro-monarchy supporter at the rally site was arrested for possession of a pistol and ammunition, which he said was only for self-defence. On the second day of the parliament session, lawmakers rejected five of the seven proposals to amend the constitution, including the submission by Internet Law Reform Dialogue, or iLaw, which was most preferred by the protesters. A chemistry professor later revealed that the purple-dyed water included numerous chemicals in the tear gas group, which though non-lethal, were highly concentrated.

On 18 November, angered by the rejection of the people-proposed constitutional bill and the use of force the day before, thousands of protesters gathered at the Royal Thai Police's headquarters and hurled paint and sprayed graffiti in the area. On 19 November, police officers and pro-government volunteers rushed to clean it, which earned a thanks from Prayut. On 21 November, high school students led thousands of protesters in Bangkok. In addition to the common protest themes of government and monarchy reform, high school students are seeking more freedom and fairness in an education system they charge with promoting archaic principles of obedience over teaching. The students also campaigned for gender equality. The demonstration featured a female protester who charged that she was sexually harassed by her teacher years ago, but then was faced with much criticism regarding the factuality and her intention, including from a senator and a pro-government MP.

On 25 November, over 10,000 protesters converged on the headquarters of Siam Commercial Bank (SCB) in northern Bangkok, in which the King is the largest shareholder with a stake of 23.4 percent valued at over $2.3 billion. Protest organizers originally planned to gather at Democracy Monument and then march toward the CPB in the administrative heart of the capital to demand an investigation into the king's wealth and spending. The police had heavily barricaded the CPB area with shipping containers, concrete barricades and a cocoon of razor wire. Protesters had been warned not to come within 150 metres (490 ft) of the compound. The day before, Thai authorities ordered 12 protest leaders to turn themselves in on 1 December and face charges that include lèse-majesté. A well-known Thai royalist scholar Sulak Sivaraksa decried Prayut's using the lèse-majesté law against the King's wishes and called for the prime minister's removal from office. At least two protesters were wounded in an explosion and shooting incident late into the night, four or five shots being fired. The police put the blame on rivalry in the vocational students group themselves.

On 27 November, about 5,000 protesters joined an anti-coup drill in northern Bangkok's Lat Phrao Intersection. They carried inflatable Santa Claus figures and bright yellow rubber ducks, which have become a symbol of the protest. They also raise the three-finger salute against an inflatable alien doll. Police warned not to demonstrate. Protest leader Panupong "Mike Rayong" Jadnok urged people to park vehicles at key Bangkok intersections in the event of a coup, to make it harder for the armed forces to deploy their weaponry.

On 29 November, thousands of protesters marched to a barracks belonging to Thailand's royal guards in Bangkok on Sunday, demanding the King to give up control of some army regiments. They carried inflatable ducks and marched to the 11th Infantry Regiment, one of two army units that the king brought under his direct command in 2019. Protesters later splashed red paint on the ground in front of officers, referencing the deadly army crackdown on anti-government redshirt demonstrators in 2010. The army base was barricaded with buses, which were removed by protesters, as well as loops of barbed wire. Riot police wore gas masks and helmets, blocked protesters at the gate.
