= Lat Phrao Intersection =

Road intersection in Bangkok, Thailand

Coordinates: 13°48′48″N 100°33′34″E

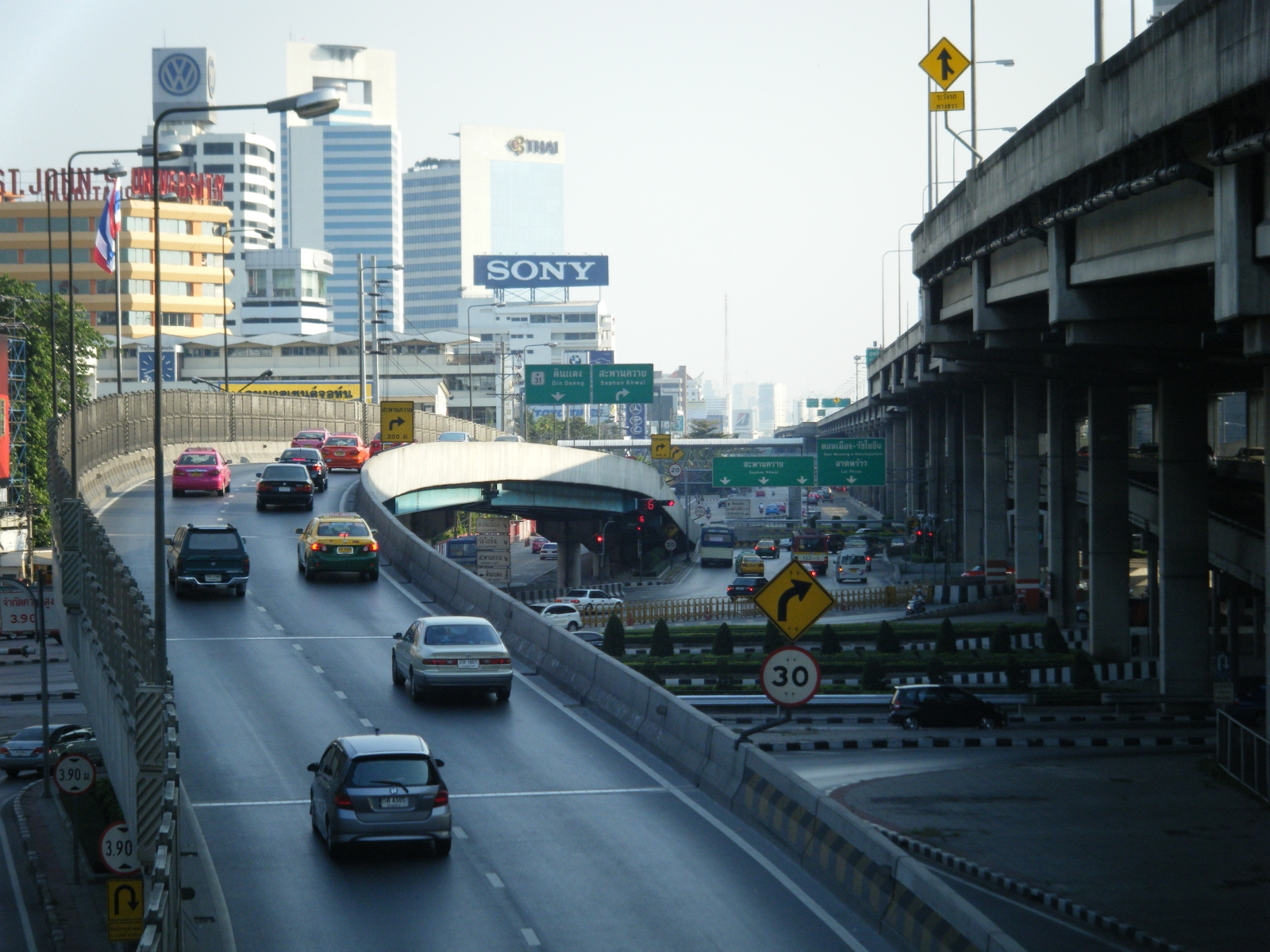
View from one of the flyovers crossing the intersection, looking along Vibhavadi Rangsit Road to the south, in 2010

Lat Phrao Intersection (Thai: ห้าแยกลาดพร้าว, RTGS: Ha Yaek Lat Phrao pronounced [hâː jɛ̂ːk lâːt pʰráːw], ha yaek meaning 'five-way junction') is a major road junction in Chatuchak District of the Thai capital Bangkok. It is where Phahonyothin and Vibhavadi Rangsit roads—the city's two main northward highways—cross each other, and is also the beginning of Lat Phrao Road, which leads eastward through its highly populated suburbs. The junction carries the second-highest amount of road traffic in the city.

As a five-way junction with multiple flyovers, some directions of traffic must follow complicated routes through the junction. The elevated Don Mueang Tollway runs above the flyovers carrying Vibhavadi Rangsit Road, and the northward extension of the BTS Skytrain's Sukhumvit Line, opened in 2019, soars above as a third level of elevated infrastructure. The BTS's Ha Yaek Lat Phrao station serves the area, as does the Phahon Yothin station of the underground MRT Blue Line.

The neighbourhood around the intersection is home to numerous shops, retail centres and commercial offices. With the opening of the BTS extension, numerous condominium towers have also risen in the area. Directly west of the intersection lies the extensive green spaces of the coterminous Chatuchak, Wachirabenchathat and Queen Sirikit parks, the largest in the city. The CentralPlaza Lardprao and Union Mall shopping malls occupy the junction's northern and eastern corners, while many office towers are located in its southern corner.

In January 2014, the political protest group the People's Democratic Reform Committee occupied the intersection for anti-government protests in the course of the 2013–2014 Thai political crisis. In May 2018, the Bangkok Metropolitan Administration began cracking down on street vendors around the intersection in an effort of urban tidying.

Area map, with the intersection marked
