= J.J Mall =

J.J. Mall
- เจเจมอลล์
- Location: Chatuchak, Bangkok, Thailand
- Address: 588 Kamphaeng Phet 2 Road, Chatuchak, Bangkok 10900
- Opened: 2009
- Manager: J.J. Mall Company Limited (บริษัท เจเจมอลล์ จำกัด)
- Parking: Approximately 2,000 vehicles
- Public transit: MRT Kamphaeng Phet; MRT Chatuchak Park; BTS Mo Chit
- Website: www.jjmall.co.th

J.J. Mall (Thai: เจเจมอลล์) is a shopping complex located in the middle of Chatuchak District, near the Chatuchak Weekend Market (J.J. Market) in Bangkok, Thailand. It was officially registered as a company in 2003 and later opened its indoor shopping complex in Bangkok. Located next to Chatuchak Weekend Market and Chatuchak Park, the mall is a seven-storey, fully air-conditioned shopping center offering a wide range of retail and wholesale products. It is surrounded by popular shopping, food, entertainment, and green-space destinations, and includes various major brands, restaurants, convenience stores, and service providers. Throughout its development, the area has experienced several major incidents, while the mall and its businesses also faced significant financial challenges during the COVID-19 pandemic.

== History ==
J.J. Mall Company Limited was officially registered on 10 June 2003, marking the establishment of the company responsible for operating the shopping complex. The mall was developed in the Chatuchak district of Bangkok as part of the area's expanding commercial and retail environment. Its location near Chatuchak Weekend Market provided access to an established shopping destination that attracted both local residents and international visitors.

By July 2007, J.J. Mall was already operating as an indoor shopping complex. An article published by BK Magazine on 5 July 2007 described the mall as an air-conditioned shopping destination offering hundreds of shops across three shopping levels. The article highlighted its range of retail businesses, including clothing, footwear, gifts, Thai handicrafts, jewellery, antiques and home-decoration products. It also described the mall as an alternative to the outdoor Chatuchak Weekend Market, allowing visitors to shop in an indoor environment throughout the week.

== Incidents ==
=== Impact of the COVID-19 pandemic ===
Businesses operating at J.J. Mall experienced significant financial difficulties during the COVID-19 pandemic. More than 100 shop operators at the mall called on J.J. Mall Company Limited to reduce common-area fees by 50 percent after the pandemic caused a major decline in customer numbers.

Reports stated that tourist numbers had fallen by more than 90 percent, causing many shops to experience continuing financial losses. The group of shop operators consequently asked the mall's management to provide financial assistance and consideration for businesses affected by the decline in visitors.

Street Food JJ Mall

Kittikhun Rojanajirakul, the owner of a home-decoration shop, reported that his total sales during February were less than 50,000 baht. Before the COVID-19 outbreak affected his business, monthly sales had reportedly ranged from approximately 100,000 to 200,000 baht.

== Location ==
J.J. Mall Chatuchak is located at 588 Kamphaeng Phet 2 Road in Chatuchak district, Bangkok, next to Chatuchak Weekend Market and Chatuchak Park. It operates as an indoor shopping complex specializing in both retail and wholesale products.

Chatuchak–Bang Sue

Chatuchak is one of Bangkok's major areas recognized by both local and international visitors, alongside Siam, Ratchaprasong, and the Chao Phraya riverside. The district contains a concentration of shopping destinations, markets, parks, restaurants, and other visitor attractions.

=== Nearby places ===
Queen Sirikit Park

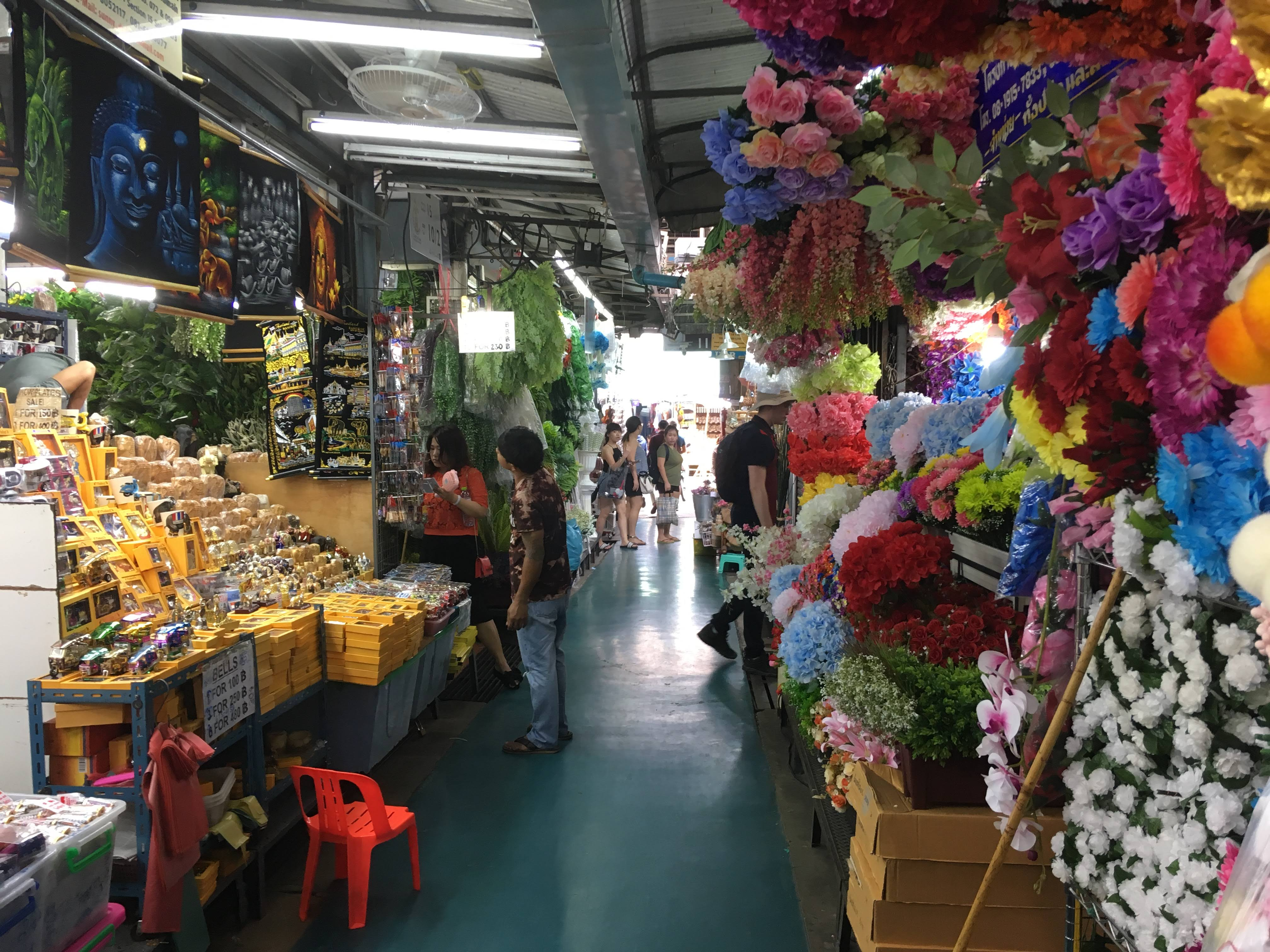
Chatuchak Weekend Market

J.J. Mall is surrounded by a variety of shopping, food, recreation, and green-space destinations. Nearby places include Chatuchak Weekend Market, Or Tor Kor Market, Chatuchak Park, Mixt Chatuchak, Queen Sirikit Park, and other museums and parks in the Chatuchak area.

Its proximity to Chatuchak Weekend Market allows J.J. Mall to provide an indoor and air-conditioned shopping environment for visitors to the surrounding outdoor markets.

== Tenants and services ==
J.J. Mall contains a mixture of restaurants, convenience stores, cafés, retail businesses, and service providers. Businesses that have operated within the shopping complex include 7-Eleven, KFC, The Pizza Company, Black Canyon, Dairy Queen, Café Kaldi, Swensen's, Chester's, and Café Amazon.

The complex also contains food-service facilities and delivery and logistics services. These businesses complement the mall's independent retail shops and stalls.

== Retail shops ==
J.J. Mall is a fully air-conditioned shopping complex containing more than 1,200 shops and stalls. The mall offers products including clothing, fashion accessories, handicrafts, jewelry, home decorations, furniture, beauty products, electronics, food, and locally produced goods.

The ground floor contains clothing, bags, shoes, accessories, handmade goods, local products, and products associated with Thailand's One Tambon One Product (OTOP) program.

Other areas of the shopping complex contain electrical appliances, home-decoration products, computers, mobile devices, bookstores, pharmacies, beauty salons, spas, restaurants, and food services. The mall is equipped with escalators and elevators to provide access between floors.

Promotional events are periodically organized on the ground floor throughout the year, with different themes and activities.

== Economics ==
J.J. Mall operates as a retail shopping and commercial property business. J.J. Mall Company Limited was established in 2003 with registered capital of 100 million baht. The company submits annual financial statements, although detailed information concerning its annual revenue and operating budget is not widely available through free public sources.

The mall forms part of the larger commercial environment surrounding Chatuchak Weekend Market. The continued development of retail destinations and residential properties in the Chatuchak area has contributed to the area's commercial growth.

== Gallery ==
- J.J. Mall and the surrounding Chatuchak area

Chatuchak Park	Mo Chit Station	Chatuchak Clock Tower	Chatuchak Market

- Example of Retail shops

KFC	Swensens	The Pizza Company
