= Chatuchak Park =

Public park in Bangkok, Thailand

Coordinates: 13°48′29″N 100°33′20″E

- สวนจตุจักร
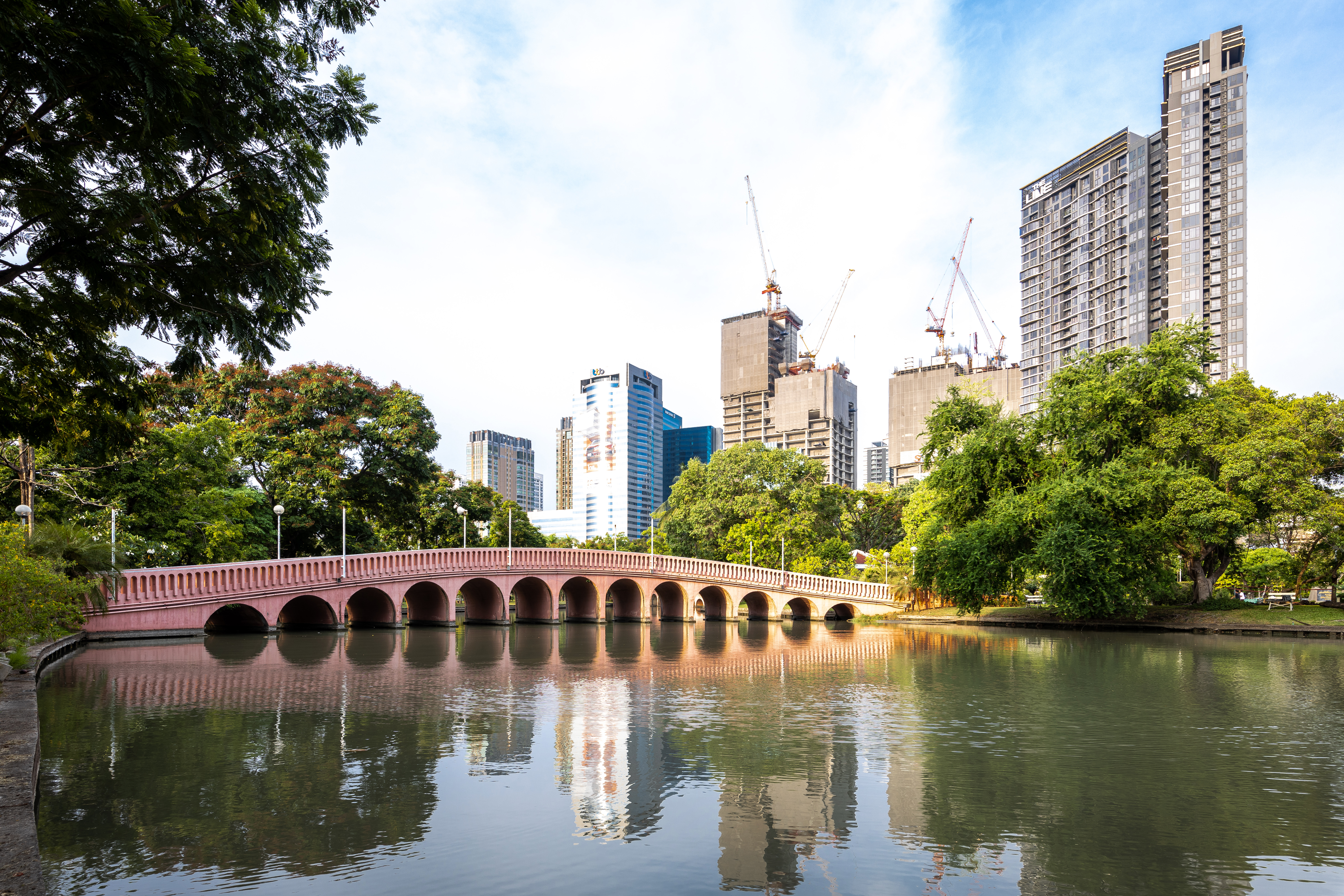
- Type: Public urban park
- Location: Chatuchak District, Bangkok, Thailand

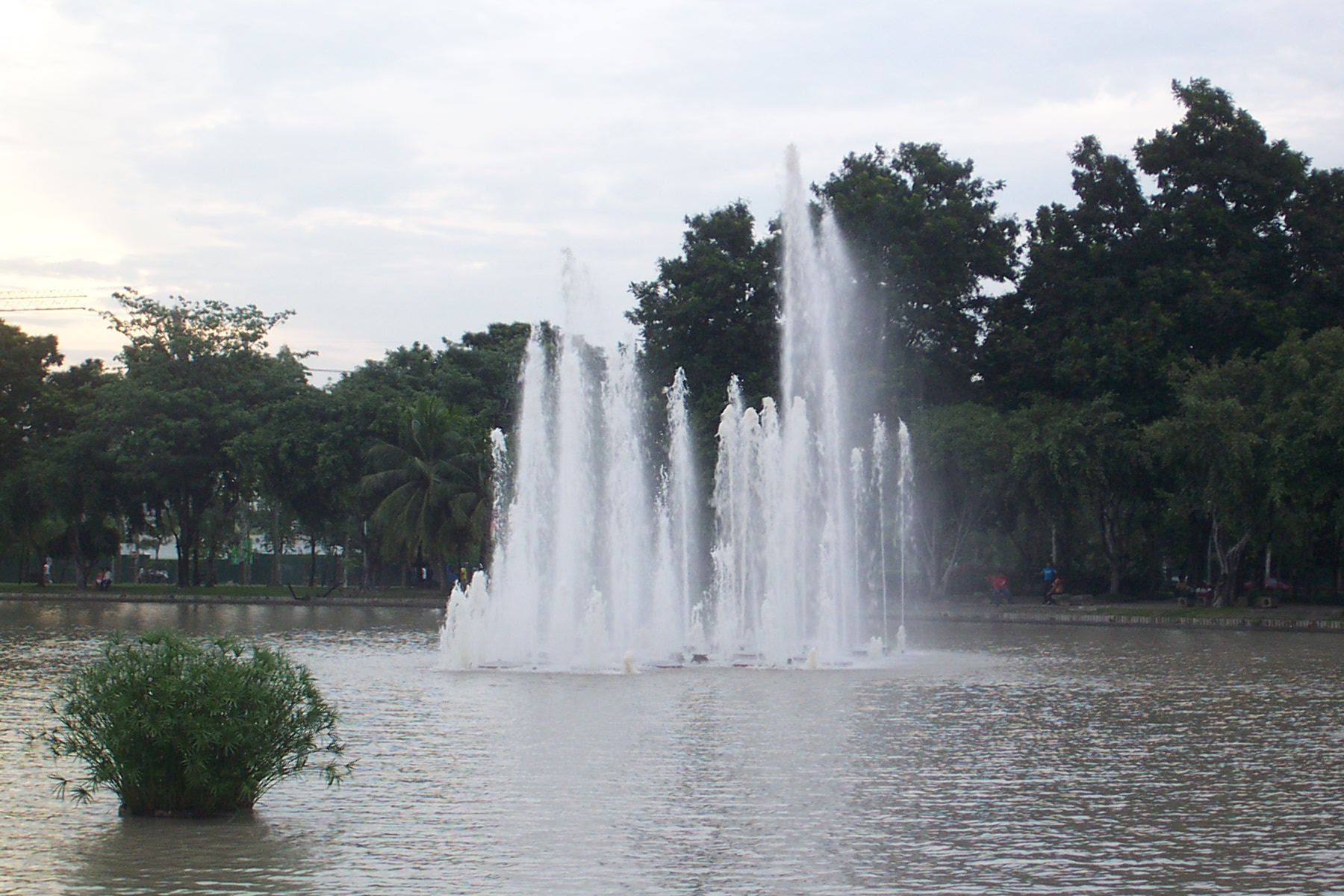
Water feature

Chatuchak Park (Thai: สวนจตุจักร, RTGS: Suan Chatuchak, pronounced [sǔa̯n t͡ɕàʔ.tùʔ.t͡ɕàk]) is a public park in the southwest part of Chatuchak District, Bangkok, Thailand. It is also the name of the Chatuchak Park MRT station that lies under the park. Its name is the origin name of Chatuchak district.

Chatuchak Park is one of the oldest public parks in Bangkok. It was built on the land formerly owned by the State Railway of Thailand (SRT), in dedication to former King Bhumibol Adulyadej (Rama IX), on the occasion of his 4th cycle (48 years) birthday anniversary on December 5, 1975. The King thus granted the name "Chatuchak" (meaning 4 cycles) to the park. The park includes many varieties of trees and plants in the garden with different themes, flowers courtyard, multipurpose ground, a clock tower, Princess Sirindhorn's birthday anniversary garden, sculptures from ASEAN countries and an inactive train museum. An artificial lake runs along this thin and long park with numerous bridges crossing the lake. The park is suitable for recreational cum exercise activities. Certified guide dogs are allowed in this park.

It has an area of 0.304 square kilometres. It was later augmented with Queen Sirikit Park, Wachirabenchathat Park, and Chak Phupha Su Maha Nathee Park, though they are separated from Chatuchak Park by Kamphang Phet 3 Road.

Chatuchak park includes Wachirabenchathat park in the summer (March to April) every year is a time when pink pouis are blooming, especially along the Phaholyothin Road adjacent to the Chatuchak Park MRT Station, causing a picturesque scenery.

== Nearby attractions ==
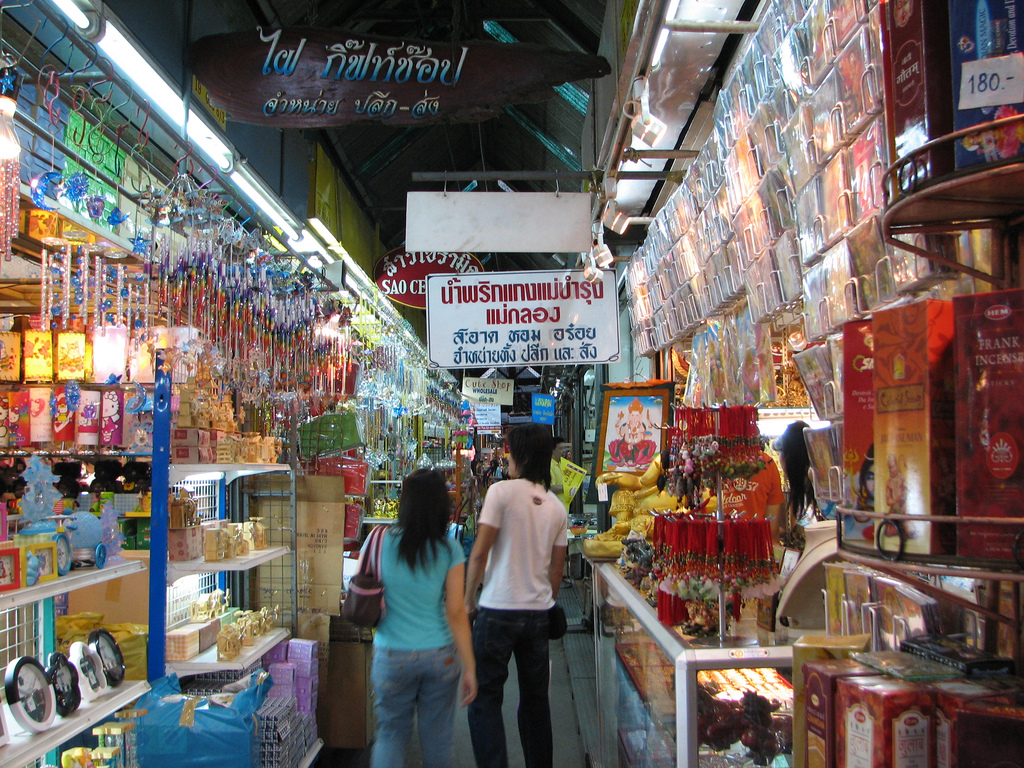
One of the many narrow soi's in Chatuchak Weekend Market

- Chatuchak Weekend Market (JJ Market)
- Children's Discovery Museum
- Jatujak Day & Night
- JJ Mall
- Queen Sirikit Park
- Chak Phupha Su Maha Nathee Park
- Hall of Railway Heritage (now closed)
- Lat Phrao Square
