= Children's Discovery Museum Bangkok 1 =

Museum in Bangkok, Thailand

Coordinates: 13.8031626°N 100.5513625°E

Children's Discovery Museum Bangkok 1, or formerly known as Bangkok Children's Discovery Museum (Thai: พิพิธภัณฑ์เด็กกรุงเทพมหานคร แห่งที่ 1, พิพิธภัณฑ์เด็กกรุงเทพ), is a museum in Bangkok, Thailand, considered as the first museum and learning centre for children in Thailand and Southeast Asia. It is situated on the southern edge of Queen Sirikit Park, opposite Sunday Market (an ornamental fish Market, part of Chatuchak Weekend Market).

It was founded after the initiation of Queen Sirikit in order for Thai youth to receive a broader learning. Governor of Bangkok Bhichit Rattakul under instructions from the queen arranged a 2-acre part of Queen Sirikit Garden to build the Children's Discovery Museum. The project started in early 2000, and finished in mid-2001 under governor Samak Sundaravej.

The museum consists of three exhibiting buildings, a conference room and service areas indoor and outdoor. The total area is more than 10,000 square metres. It is utilized for activities, learning and recreation. There is a Bangkok Children's Discovery Museum Foundation.
