= Old Mo Chit Bus Terminal =

Coordinates: 13°48′06″N 100°33′16″E

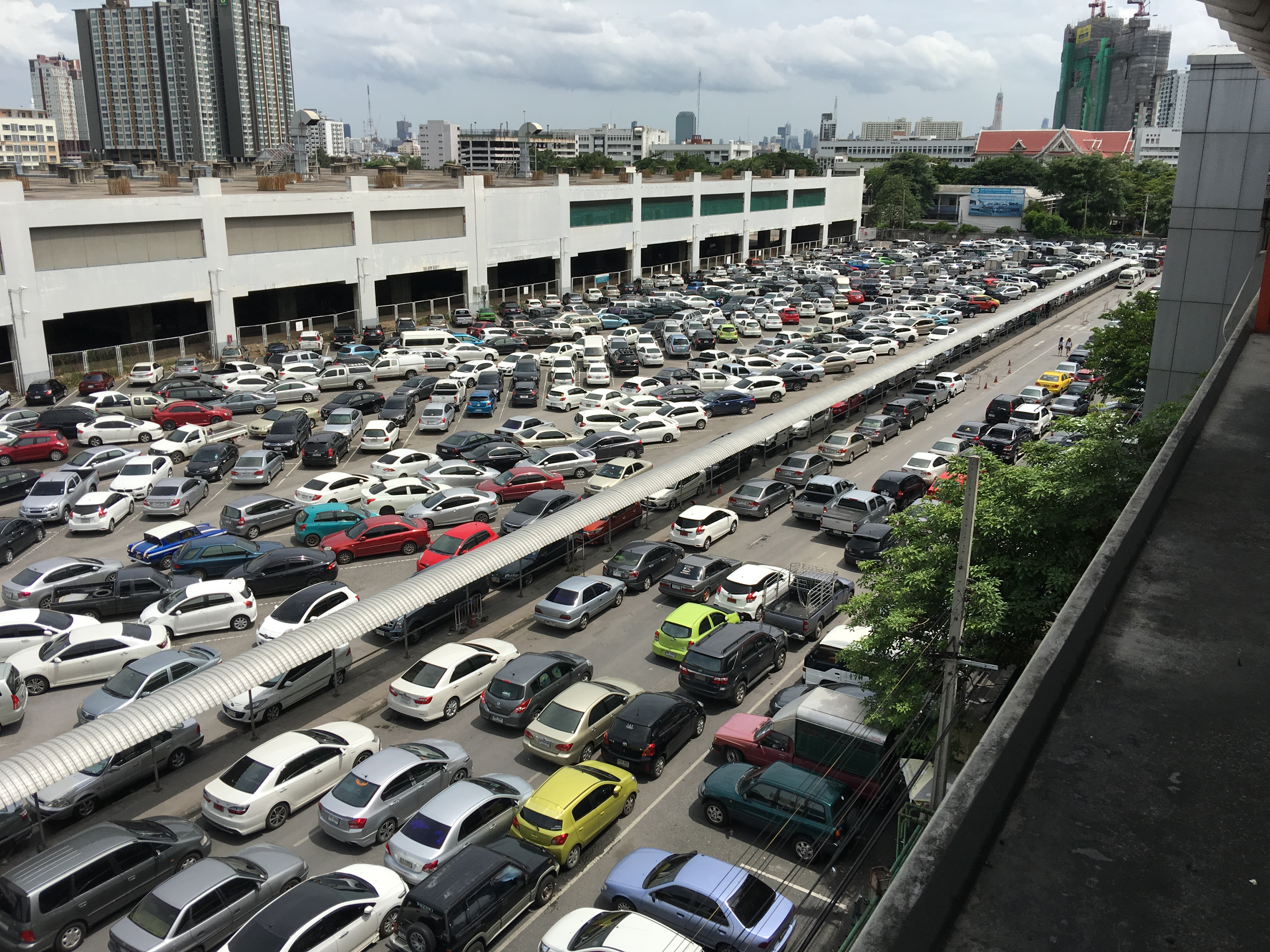
the BTS depot now occupies the former location of Mo Chit Bus Terminal.

The Old Mo Chit Bus Terminal was the main bus station serving northern and northeastern routes of long-distance buses travelling to and from Bangkok. It was active from 1967 to 1998, when its operations moved to the Mo Chit 2 bus terminal, which then became known as New Mo Chit. The site of the old bus station now serves as the main depot of the BTS skytrain system, as well as one of its parking areas. It also lends its name to the BTS's Mo Chit station, which stands in front of the depot.

== Name ==
The name Mo Chit (Thai: หมอชิต) was derived from that of Mo Chit Market, which was held in the area before the bus station was built. The market's name, literally meaning "Doctor Chit", is in turn believed to refer to Chit Naphasap (Thai: ชิต นภาศัพท์, 1895–1953), an entrepreneur best known for his brand of ya nat, a Thai form of herbal snuff.
