= Wachirabenchathat Park =

Park in Bangkok, Thailand

Coordinates: 13.812°N 100.554°E

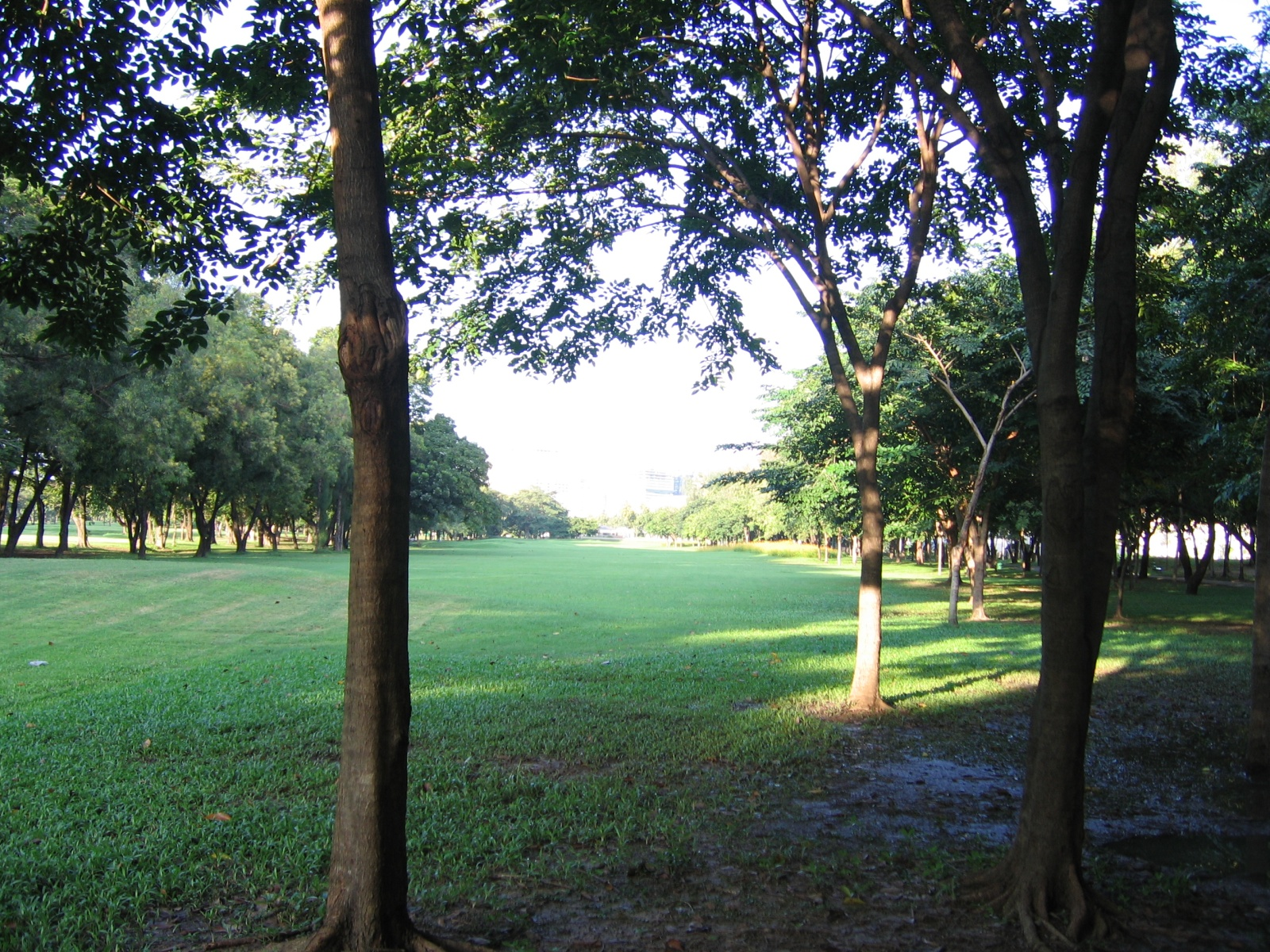
Wachirabenchathat Park

Wachirabenchathat Park, or often spelled Vachirabenjatas Park (Thai: สวนวชิรเบญจทัศ, RTGS: Suan Wachirabenchathat, pronounced [sǔan wá(ʔ).tɕʰī.rá(ʔ).bēn.tɕā.tʰát]), also popularly known as State Railway Public Park (สวนรถไฟ, RTGS: Suan Rotfai, pronounced [sǔan rót.fāj]) is a public park in Chatuchak district, Bangkok, Thailand. The park borders the Queen Sirikit Park and Chatuchak Park. It's the largest park of the complex, bounded by Kamphaeng Phet 3 road and Kamphaeng Phet 2 road with Soi Nikhom Rotfai Sai 1 near the PTT Head Office and Ministry of Energy. This is one of the most popular public parks in Bangkok.

== History ==
Formerly being the State Railway of Thailand (SRT)'s golf course, the 375-rai (60.0 ha; 148-acre) plot of land was converted into a public park for recreational activities and doing exercises of the people living in the vicinity. Its name means "Vajira's 50", since it was made on the occasion of His Majesty King Vajiralongkorn (Rama X)'s 50th birthday in 2002 (while he was still the Crown Prince of Thailand).

== Activities ==
The old golf course was partially conserved for children's golf practices. The park is commonly used for cycling. It has a winding three-kilometer track for walking and cycling around the park. At the start of the track is a rental shop where visitors can rent bicycles. Nearby is a lake with rentable paddleboats. In the park is a beautiful butterfly garden and insectarium for relaxation and education. The miniature town consists of scaled down versions of Bangkok's famous buildings and tourist attractions. It was created for children to learn about traffic rules by riding a bicycle in this area. Some parts are used for sports, swimming pool and a camping site. There are plenty of big trees which form a natural habitat for various birds and birdwatching.

== Structures ==
The southeast of the park has the Buddhadasa Indapanno Archives (BIA) (aka Suan Mokkh Bangkok) is a Buddhadāsa Bhikkhu's Dharma learning and edutainment center.

The Bang Sue Environmental Education and Conservation Center (EECC) was built in 2015. It was designed in accordance with the existing environment nearby (Chatuchak, Bang Sue, Phaya Thai) at the northwest reservoir of the park. The EECC project is housed in an environmental education and ecology conservation center (especially aquatic plants). The purpose is to educate and raise awareness on the importance of environmental resources. A large artificial waterfall-façade faces the park.

== Gallery ==
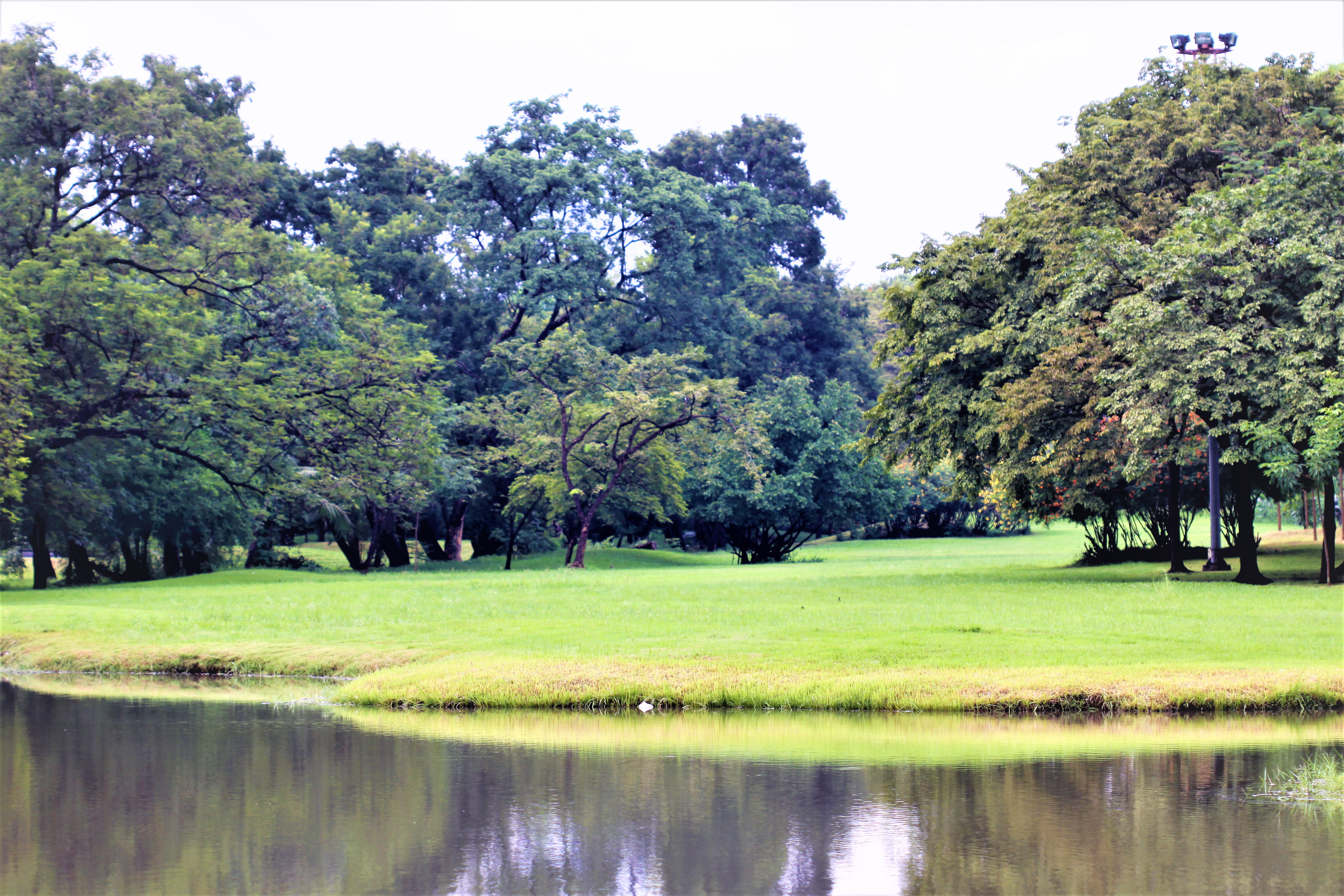
Lake, Wachirabenchathat Park

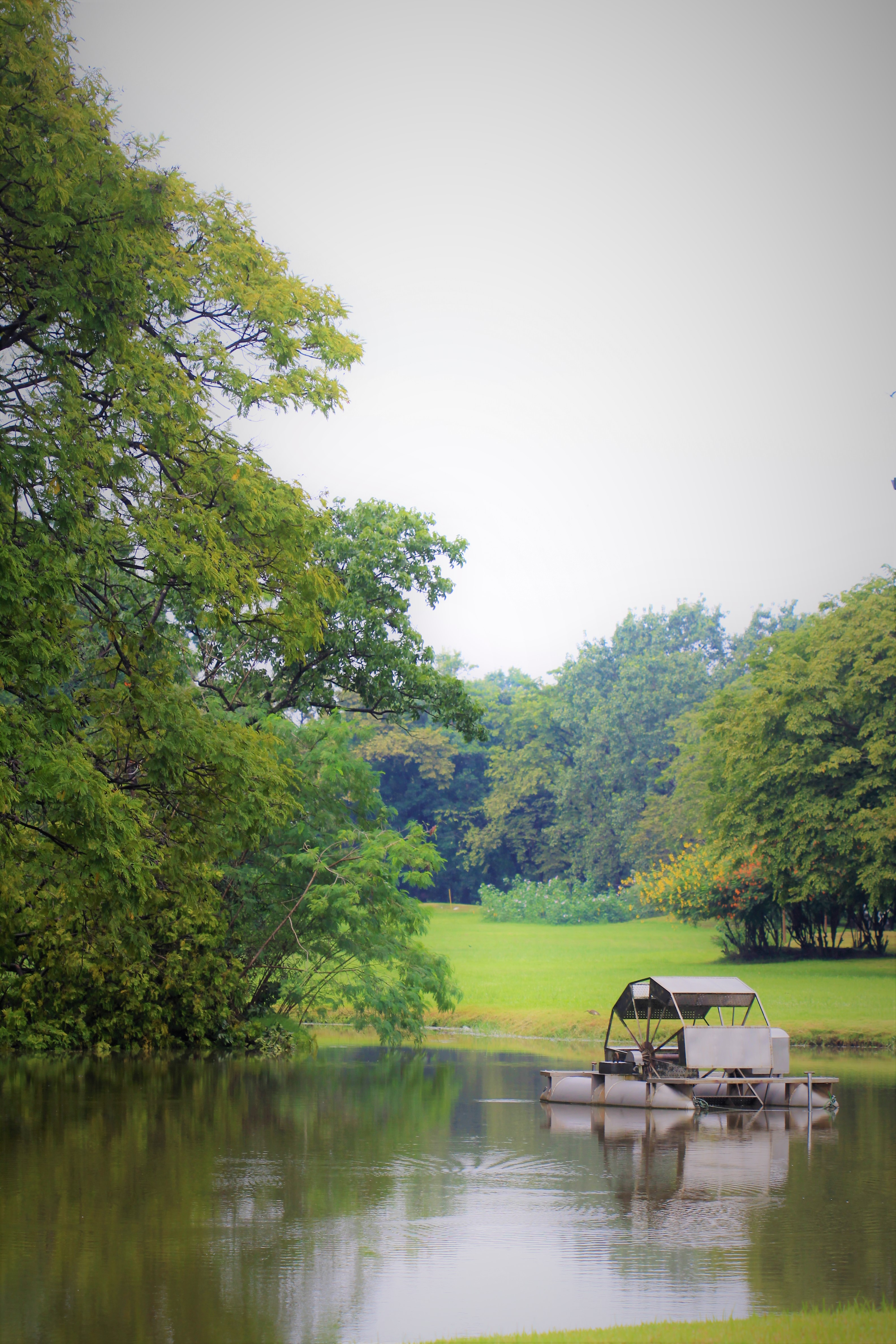
Lake and trees with water turbine

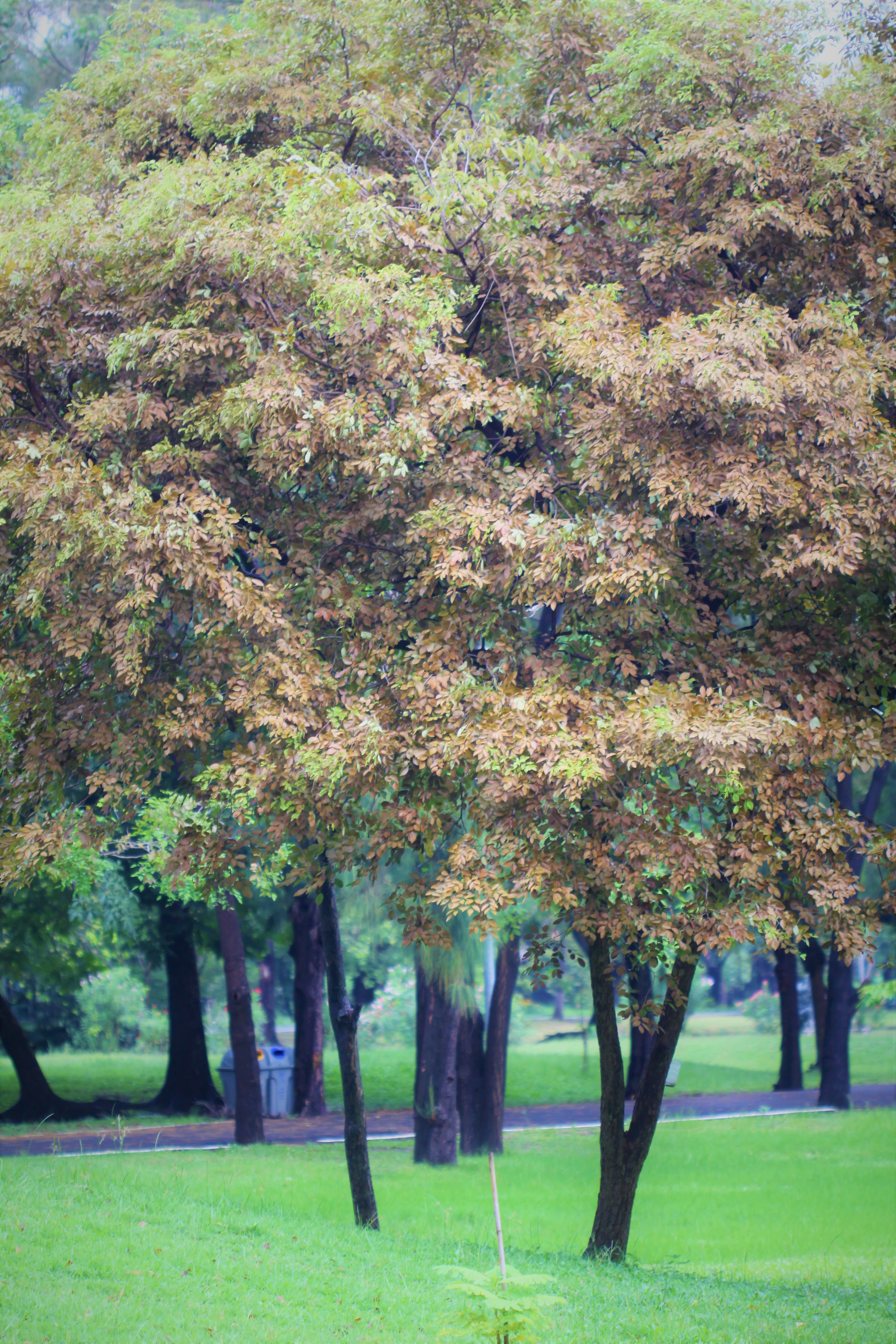
Green trees in the park

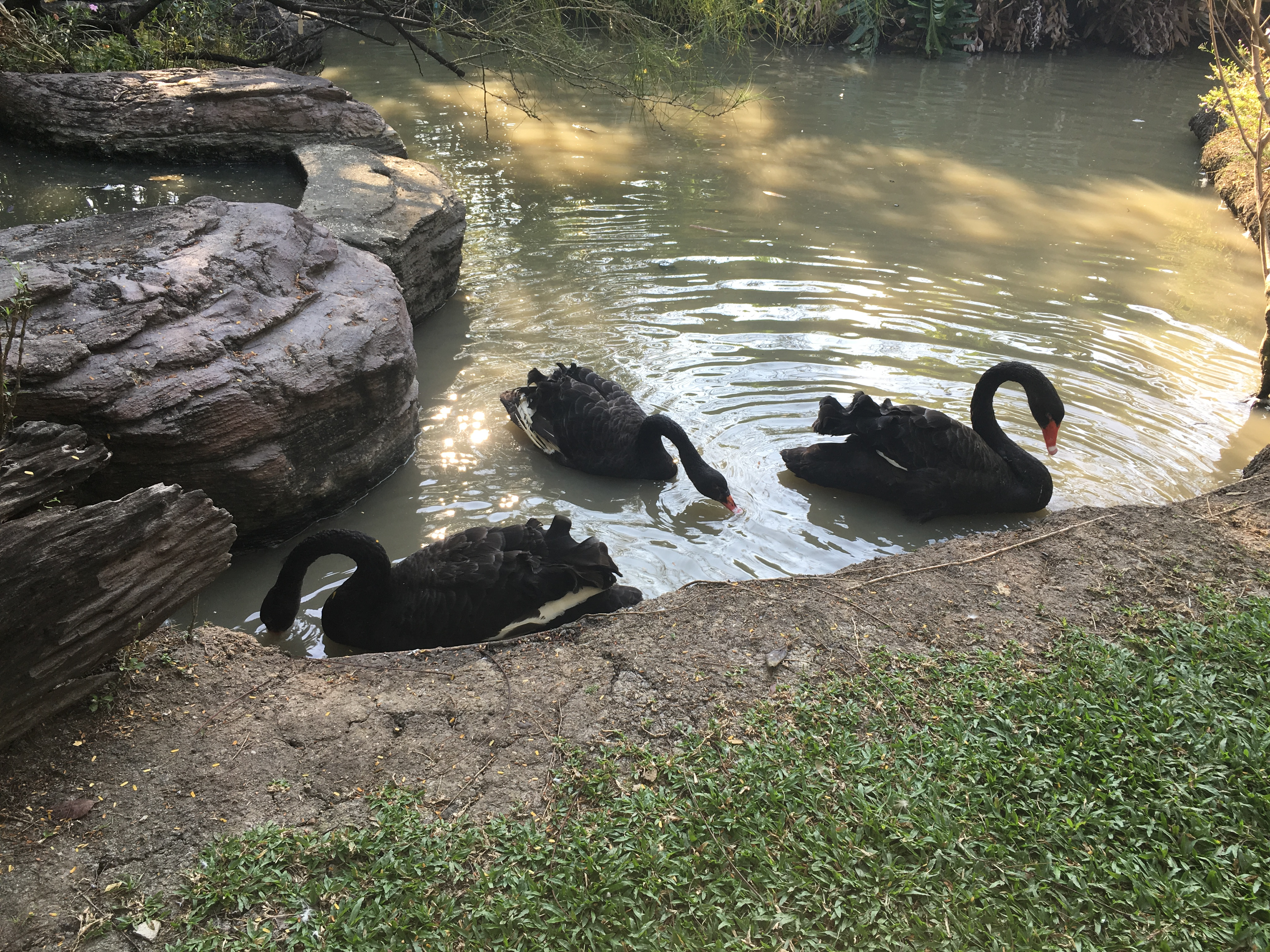
Black swans in the park

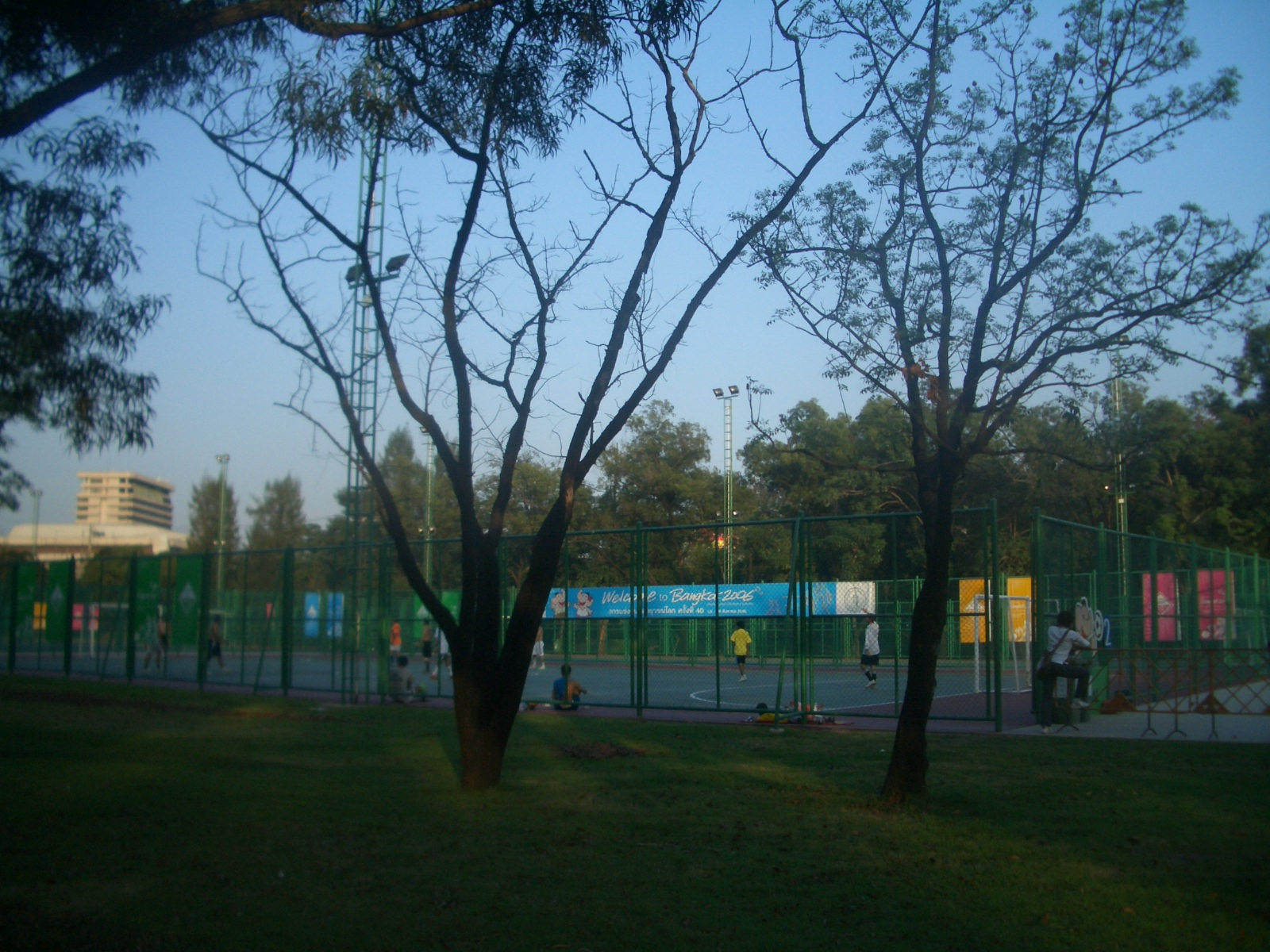
Wachirabenchathat Park in 2006

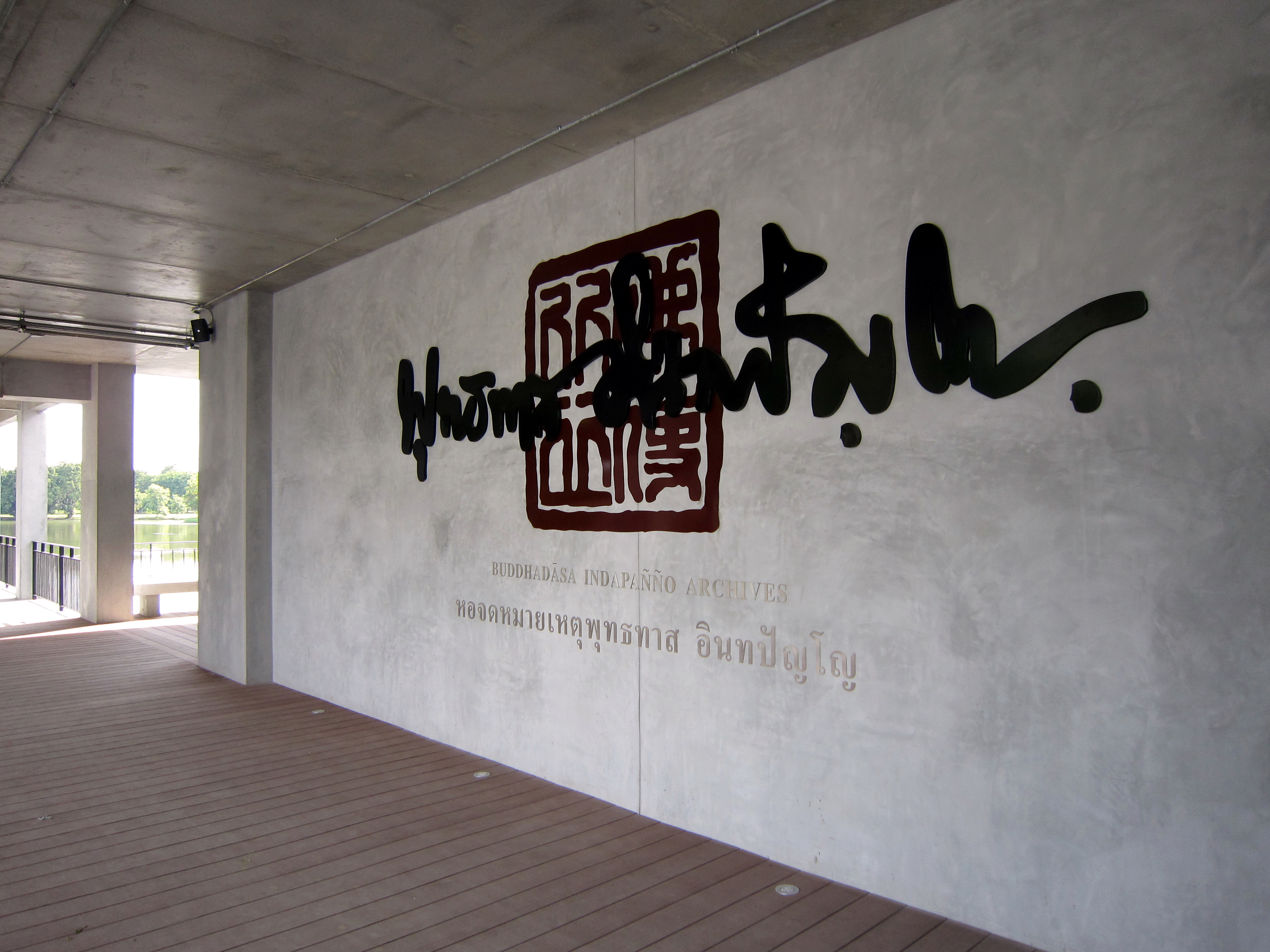
Inside Buddhadasa Indapanno Archives

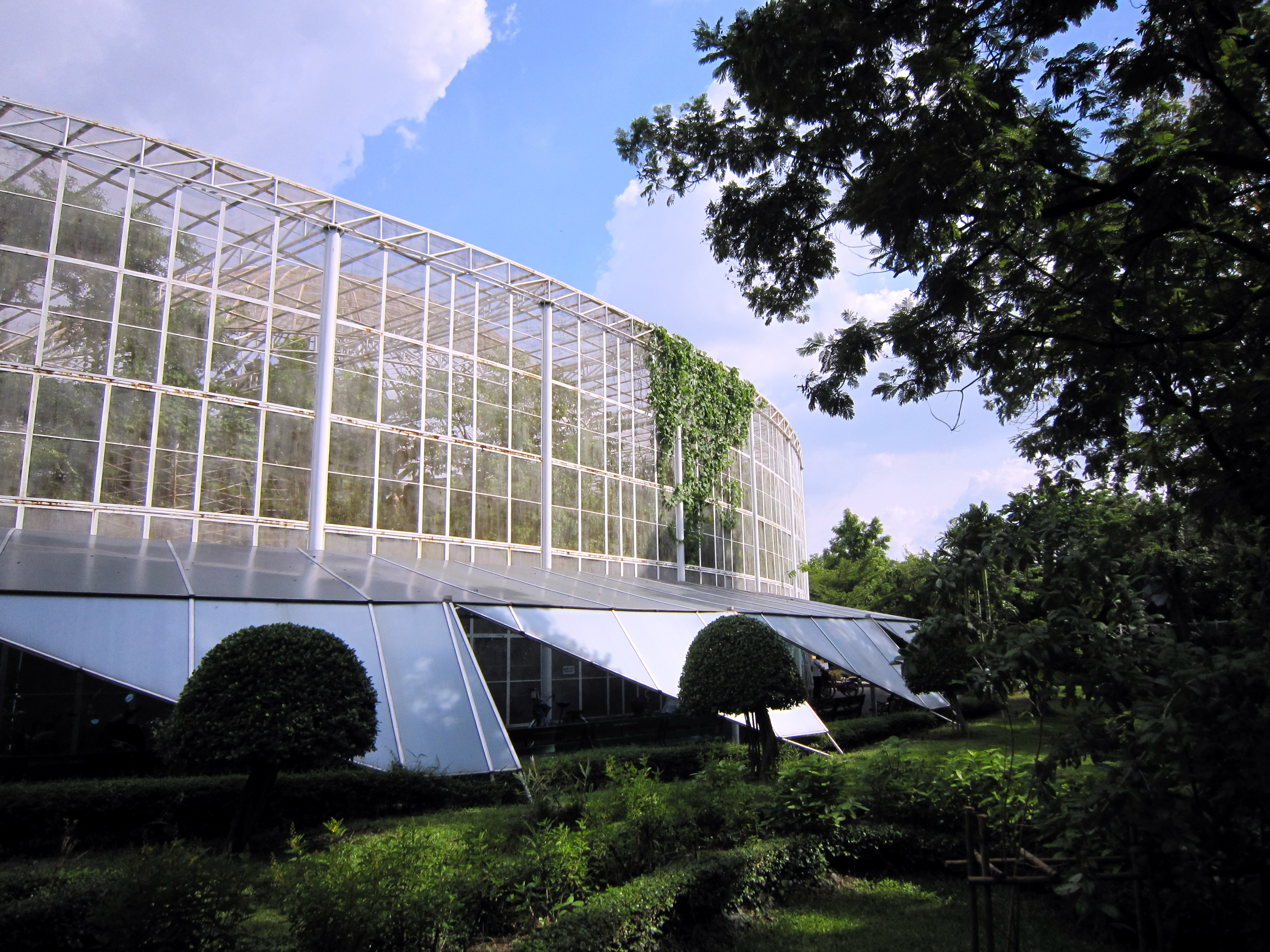
Bangkok Butterfly Garden & Insectarium

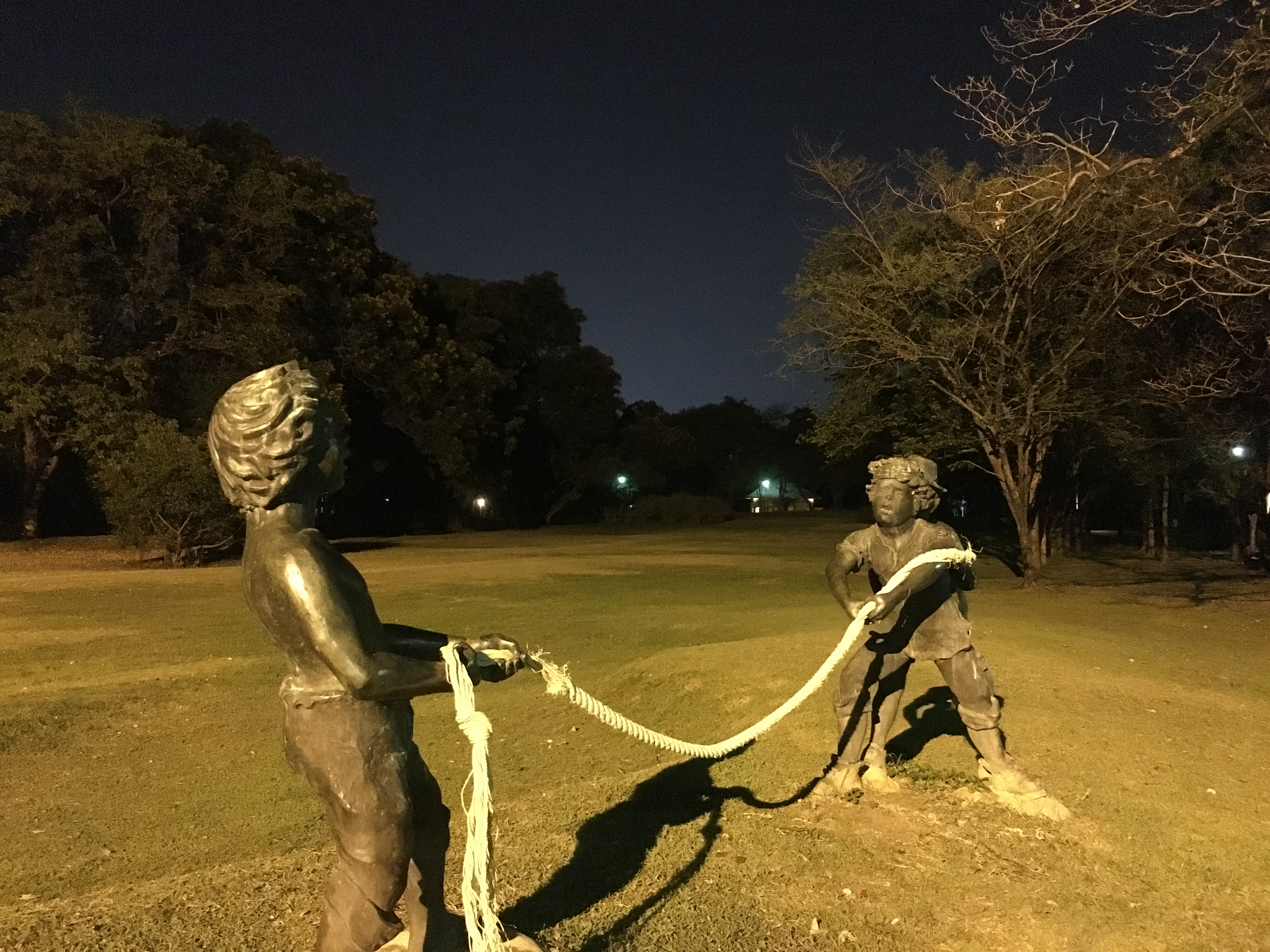
Child sculptures in the park at night

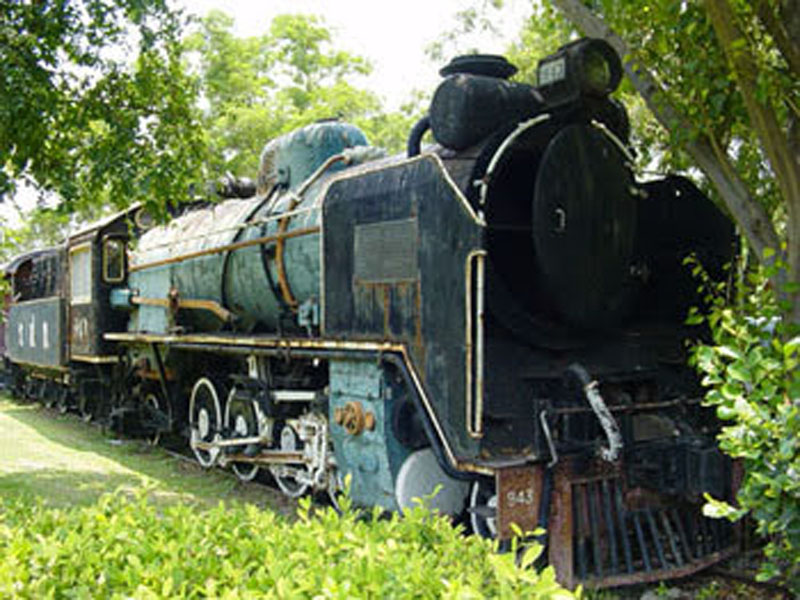
JNR Class DX50 (SRT 943) preserved near the north entrance (Soi Nikhom Rotfai Sai 1)

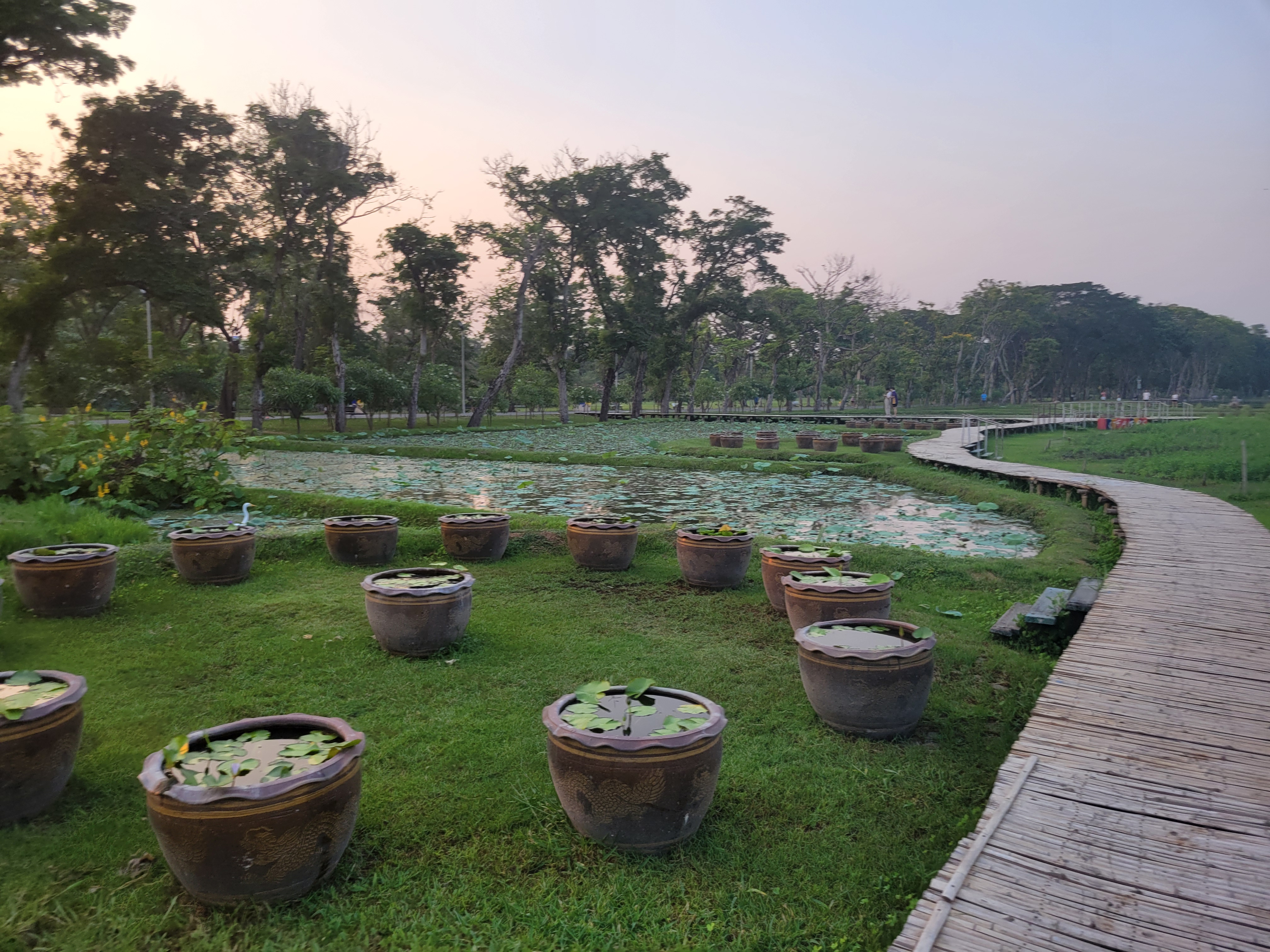
Wooden boardwalk
