= Queen Sirikit Park =

Botanical garden in Bangkok, Thailand

Coordinates: 13°48.4′N 100°33′E

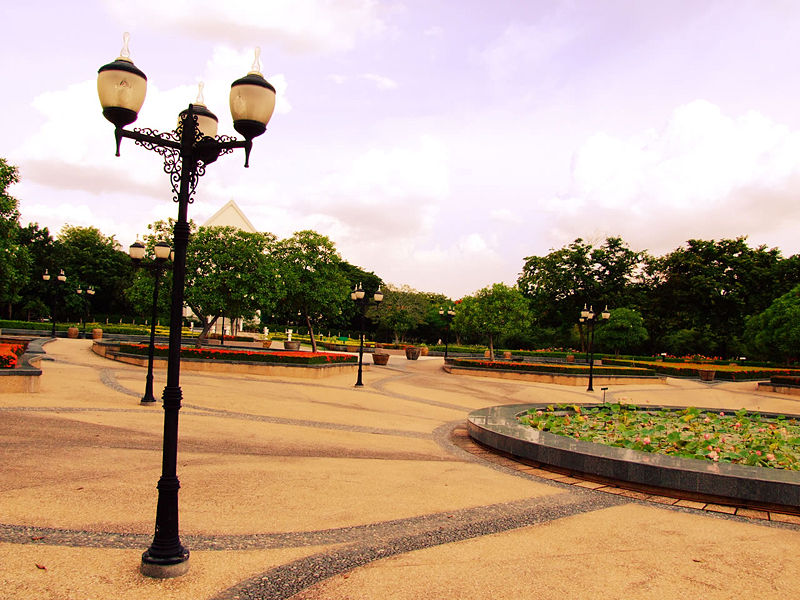
Queen Sirikit Park

Queen Sirikit Park is a botanical garden in Chatuchak District, Bangkok, Thailand. Covering an area of 0.22 km^{2}, it is part of the larger Chatuchak Park complex. It was established in 1992 and named after Sirikit, Queen of Thailand to celebrate her 60th birthday. It contains many fountains and pools where lotus flowers bloom. The park has a high biodiversity in an ecosystem which has a great variety of plants and butterflies. There is a great variety of banana cultivars, a great variety of palm tree cultivars, a great variety of hibiscus, a great variety of lotus, more than 200 species of waterlilies, a great variety of new species of plant in the world, a great variety of coconut cultivars, a great variety of bamboo cultivars, and a great variety of rare plants as well as plants endemic to Thailand.

== History ==
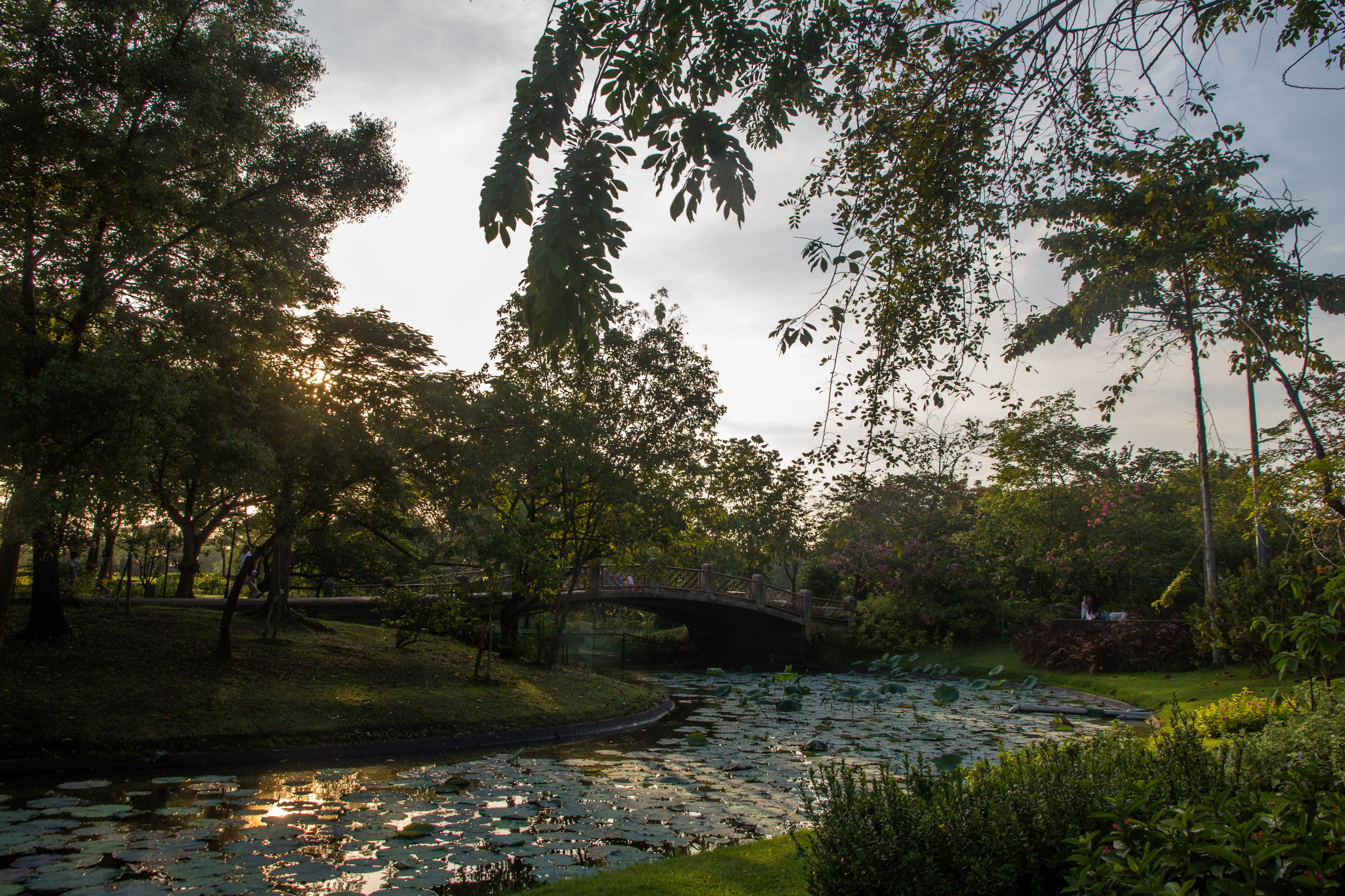
Queen Sirikit Park

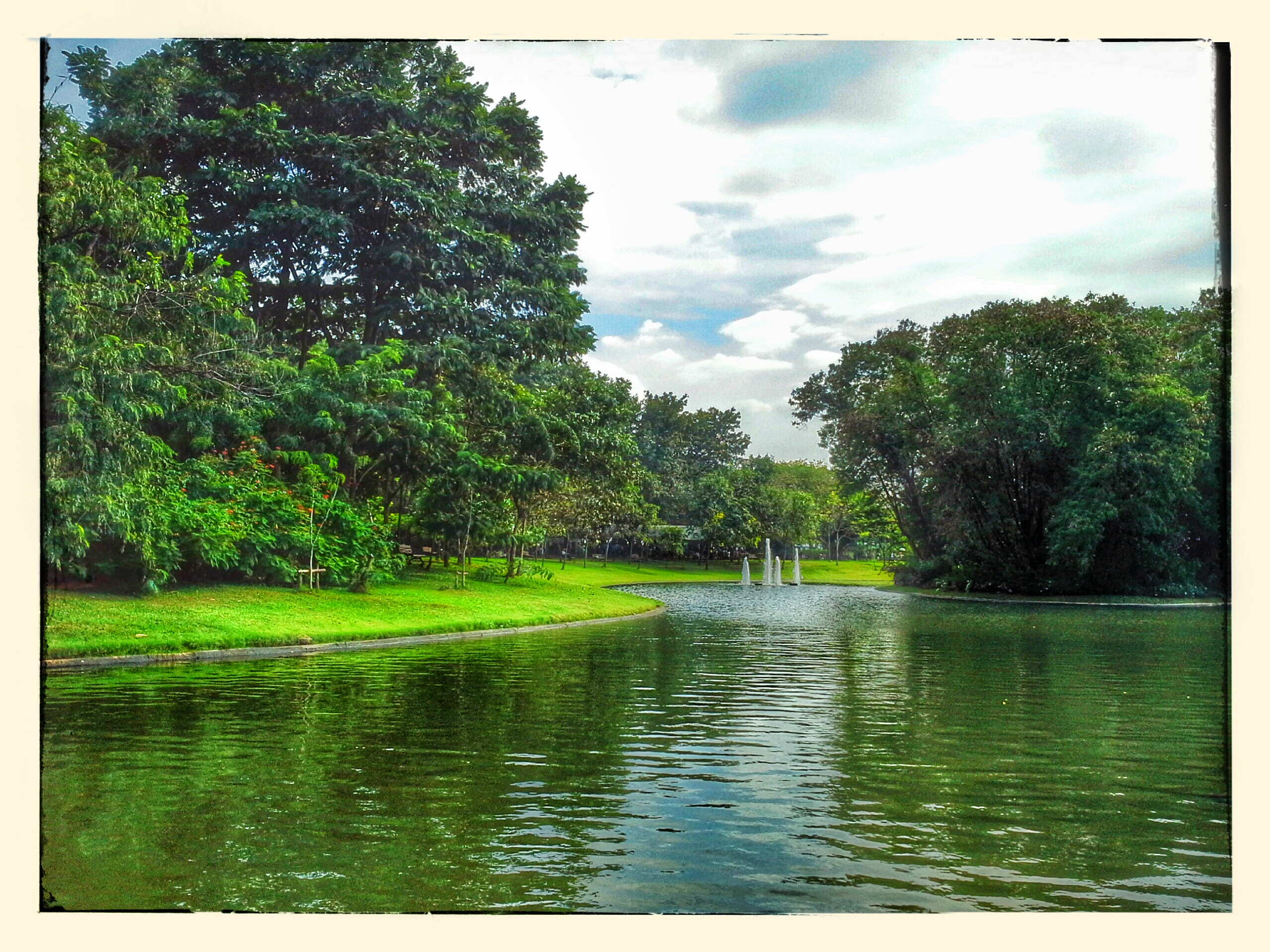
Ditch in Queen Sirikij Park

In 1991, the cabinet made the resolution to establish Queen Sirikit Park, the park for celebrations on the Auspicious Occasion of Queen Sirikit's 5th Cycle (60 years) Birthday anniversary, on 12 August 1992. The cabinet assigned the Ministry of Transport to build this park in the area of the State Railway of Thailand. This area is located in the South of the golf course of the Railway. The pattern of this park was similar as Thailand's geographical map. The area in the first project was 140 rai(0.224 km^{2}) and in the second project it will be expanded the area in 60 rai (0.092 km^{2}) more in the future. In this area, there can be a park for a leisure weekend, fitness park for exercise, and the place to see a beautiful botanical garden which contains more than 2,000 species of the local and foreign plants. The construction budget came from the government, the State enterprises under the Ministry of Commerce, and the private sector. In parts of long way garden maintenance, the Foundation of Her Majesty Queen Sirikit of Thailand will take care of this point.

On 1 May 1995, the cabinet transferred Queen Sirikit Park to Bangkok Metropolitan Administration. On 19 December 1996, Queen Sirikit Park opening ceremony.

== Events ==
- Queen Sirikit birth day or Mother's Day Event.

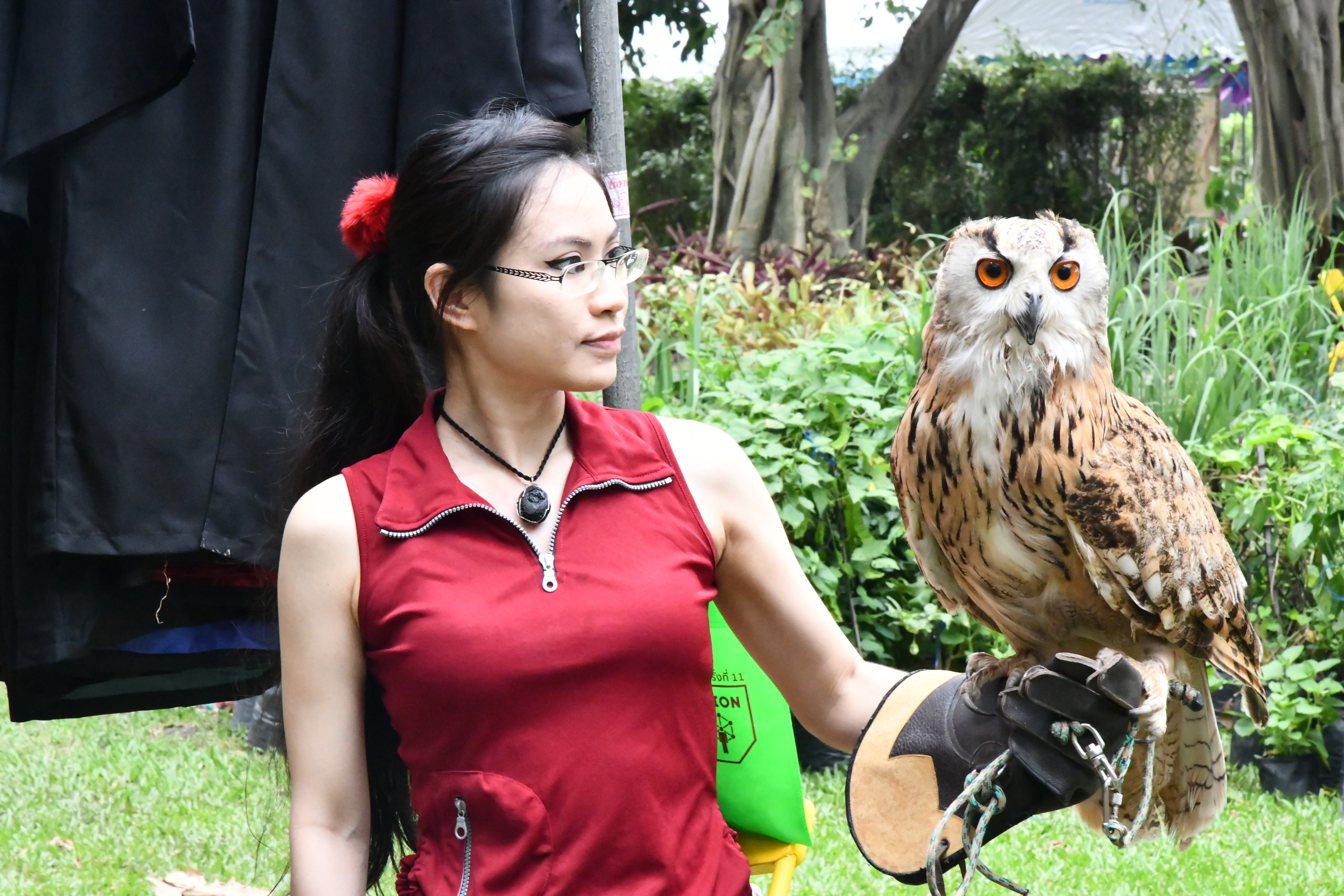
Siberian Eagle Owl shown for Event of Biodiversity.
