= List of markets in Bangkok =

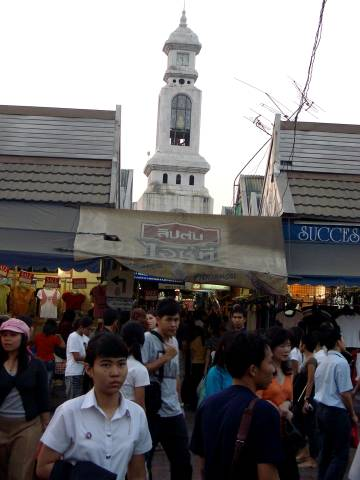
Chatuchak market

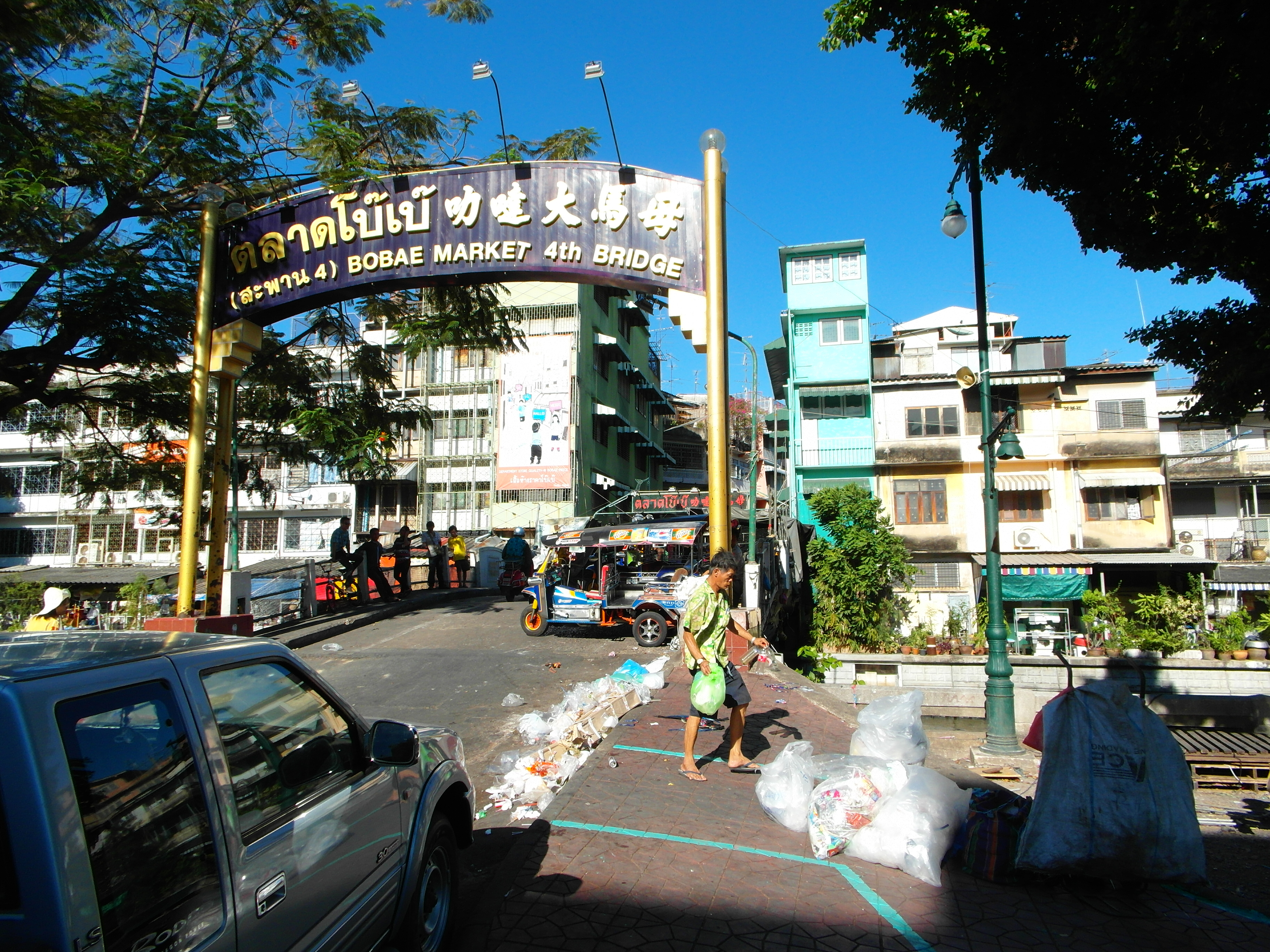
Bobae Market

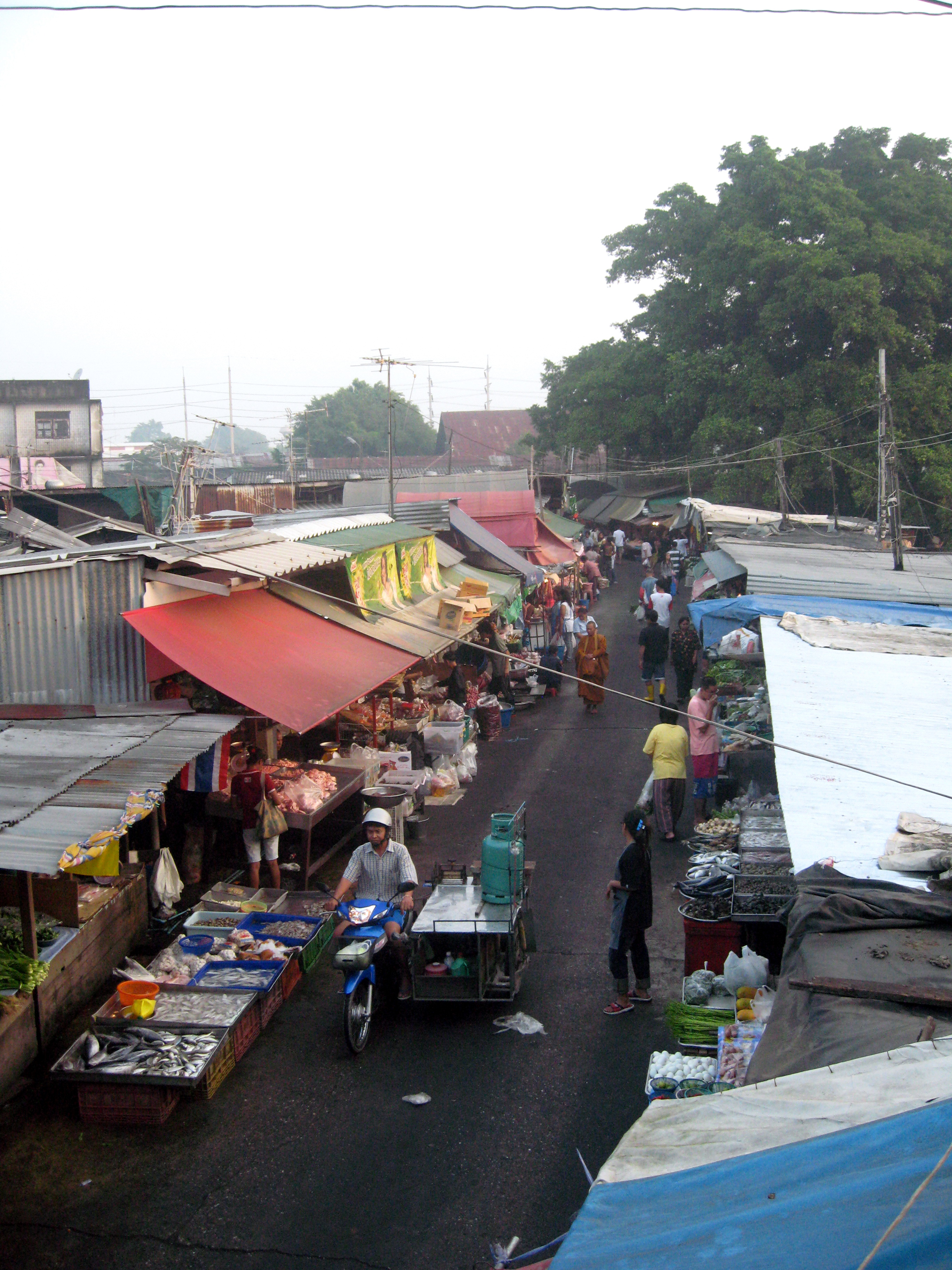
Hua Takhe Market, morning

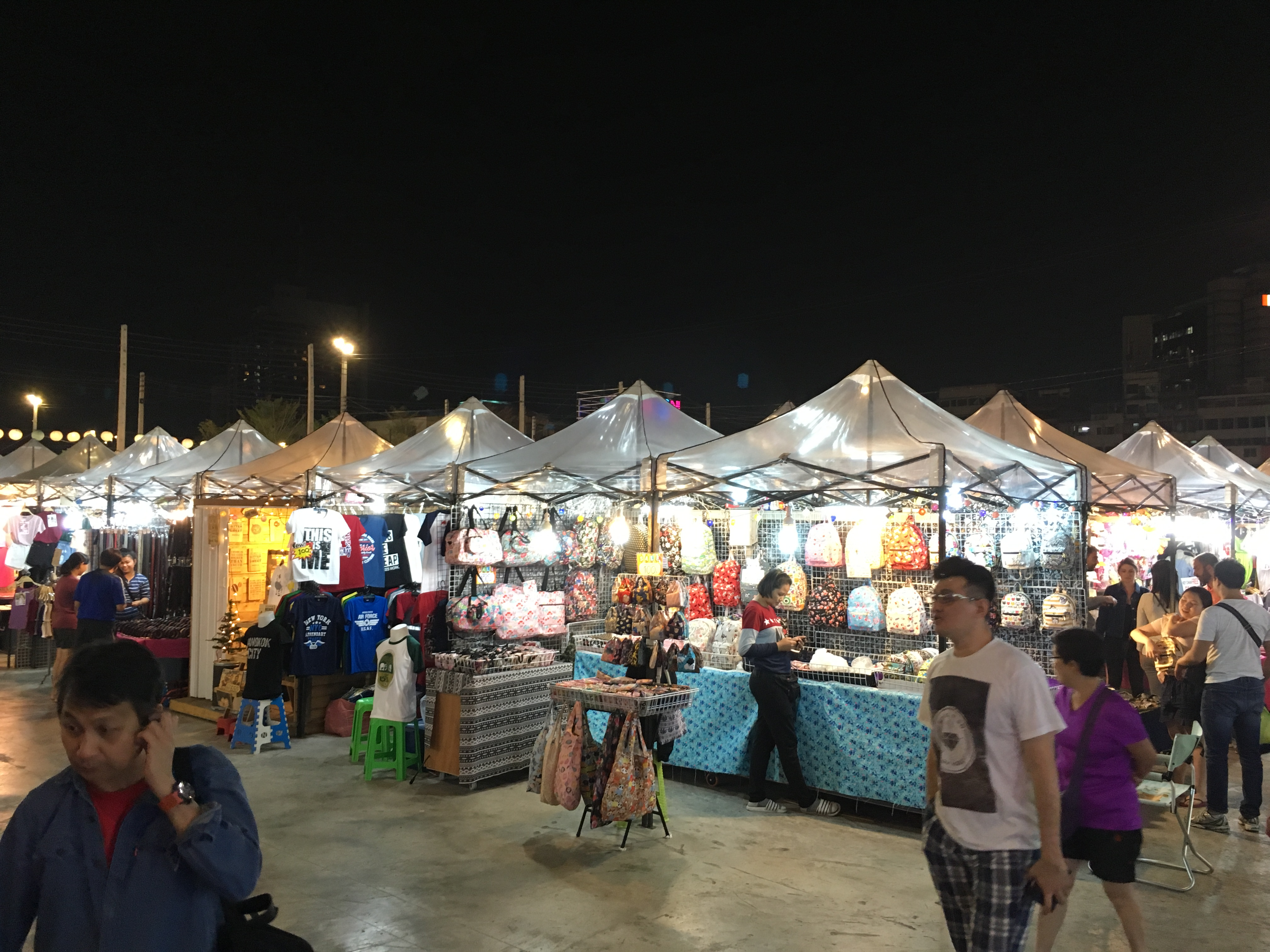
Talad Neon Downtown Night Market

There are many markets in Bangkok, Thailand. Notable markets include:

== Markets ==
- Tha Tian Market: Ordinary community market on Rattanakosin Island next to the Chao Phraya River.
- Sampheng or the official name Soi Wanich 1: A small alleyway lined with numerous shops, and part of Bangkok's Chinatown.
- Saphan Han: a continuation of Sampheng, a retail and wholesale various goods market by Khlong Ong Ang, Chakkraphet Road is between it and Phahurat.
- Phahurat Market or often known as Thailand's Little India: A large textile market.
- Ban Mo Market: Open-air market near Sampheng, Phahurat Market, and Pak Khlong Market is a market for sound equipment and appliances and jewelry.
- Bang Lamphu Market: Retail cheap clothing and student uniforms with street foods market.
- Asiatique The Riverfront: Night market (Thai: ตลาดกลางคืน; RTGS: talat klang khuen) by the Chao Phraya River, opened in 2012.
- Chatuchak Weekend Market (JJ Market): A large weekend market.
- Or Tor Kor Market: Opposite Chatuchak Weekend Market. A popular Thai food market.
- Chula Soi 12 (Suanluang Square): Near Chulalongkorn University in Suanluang area. A sportswear market.
- JJ Green Market: Second hand items, restaurants, live music. Originally located on Kamphaeng Phet 3 Road near Chatuchak Park and Chatuchak Weekend Market, but now moved to the area opposite the Dhurakij Pundit University, opened on 6 February 2020 under the new name "JJ Green^{2} Night Market".
- Srisomrat Market or Sunday Market: Large ornamental fish and other pets market, part of the Chatuchak Weekend Market, near J.J Mall, Queen Sirikit Park and Children's Discovery Museum.
- Patpong Night Market: Tourist-oriented.
- Pattavikorn Market: Secondhand clothing
- Pratunam Market: Tourist-oriented.
- Soi Lalai Sap or Si Lom Soi 5
- Soi Choei Phuang or Soi Vibhavadi Rangsit 9 in Chatuchak District: Various goods such as ladies items, kid clothes includes cafeterias. Its connects to Soi Phahonyothin 18/2 on the Phahonyothin Road. It is dubbed "Soi Lalai Sap II".
- Suan Lum Night Bazaar Ratchadaphisek
- Talat Rot Fai: Daily night market and weekend flea market. Behind the Seacon Square shopping mall.
- Wang Lang Market: Day market near Siriraj Hospital and Siriraj Medical Museum. Clothing (new and second-hand), food, small goods.
- Thonburi Market (Sanam Luang 2): Weekend market in Thonburi, like JJ Market.
- Bon Marché: In Chatuchak District close to Wat Samian Nari.
- Bobae Market: Wholesale and retail cheap clothing market along Khlong Phadung Krung Kasem close to Hua Lamphong and Saphan Khao.
- Major Ratchayothin Market: Selling items ranging from clothing to watches and sunglasses. Next to the Major Cineplex Ratchayothin.
- Bang Rak Market: Flea market. Next to Robinson Department Store (Bang Rak), Tak Sin MRT station and Tak Sin boat pier. Besides selling merchandise, they also have food trucks and stalls, beer bars, beauty salons, and tattoo shops.
- Bangkok Gate Plaza: Phahon Yothin, Sai Mai District next to Yaek Kor Por Aor BTS Station.
- Suea Pa Plaza: Retail and wholesale IT equipment and mobile phone accessories in Bangkok near Khlong Thom and Sampheng.
- Nang Loeng Market: Thailand's oldest official land market has been operating since the reign of King Rama V near Government House and Khlong Phadung Krung Kasem.
- Huai Khwang Market: Night market in Huai Khwang District close to Huai Khwang MRT station.
- Hua Mum Market: Night flea market in Lat Phrao District on Prasoet Manukit Road.
- Hua Takhe Market: A traditional market by Khlong Prawet Buri Rom in Lat Krabang District suburb Bangkok near Hua Takhe railway station.
- Siam Gypsy Junction Market: Night flea market selling second-hand goods, antiques, artwork, handicrafts, clothing, accessories including pets and ornamental plants in hipster style like Suan Lum Night Bazaar Ratchadaphisek or Talat Rot Fai under the Bang Son MRT station near Bang Sue MRT station including Bang Sue Junction Railway Station and Bang Sue Central Station
- New Don Mueang Market: Wholesale and retail cosmetics market near Don Mueang International Airport, north Bangkok
- New Sam Yan Market: A new look at Sam Yan Market with a two-modern storey building in Sam Yan area flanked by Chulalongkorn University Stadium and Pathum Wan Police Station, divided into three sections: a ready to meal, a wet market, and a cafeteria on the second floor. Open only Tuesday-Wednesday, Saturday-Sunday and public holidays owned and managed by Chulalongkorn University.
- Sampeng II Plaza: Modernized Chinese land and floating markets on Kanlapaphruek Road, Bang Khae District. Its name is derived from Sampheng.
- JODD FAIRS Rama 9: A large outdoor market with a focus on seafood stalls, there is a large outdoor cinema. The market is popular with Asian and Western tourists. The market connects to Rama 9 MRT Station.
- Market Today 64: Indoor market in Soi Vibhavadi Rangsit 64 near Chulabhorn Hospital and Lak Si Station: Ready to eat, fruit smoothie, clothing, lingerie.

== Wet markets ==
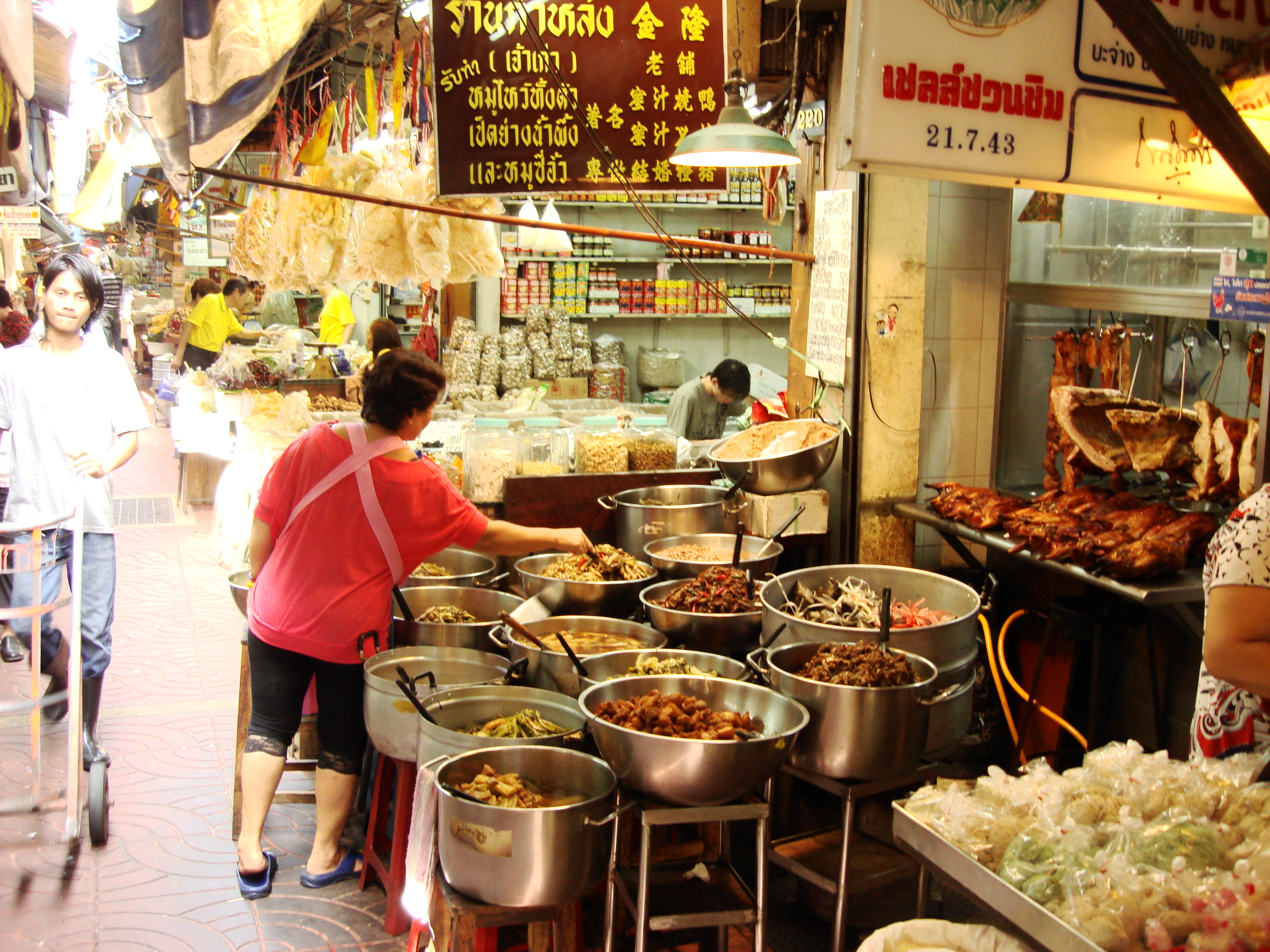
Atmosphere of Talat Kao

A wet market (Thai: ตลาดสด; RTGS: talat sot; lit: 'fresh market') is where raw or perishable foodstuffs are sold; a fresh-food market.

- Pak Khlong Market: By the Chao Phraya River. Fresh flowers and vegetables.
- Trok Mo Market, or Thesa Market: A lively morning (05:00–11:00) market in Rattanakosin Island, or Bangkok's old town zone. It is in Trok Thesa (Thesa Lane), which connects Bamrung Mueang and Ratchabophit Roads between Wat Ratchabophit and Sao Chingcha (Giant Swing) near Wat Suthat. Originally, it was in what is now the Bangkok City Hall and moved here after the construction of city hall in 1973. Fresh food, seafood, fresh fruits, vegetables, ready to meal.
- Khlong Toei Market: In Khlong Toei District.
- Bang Khae Market: In Bang Khae District, Thonburi, by the Khlong Phraya Ratcha Montri
- Talat Phlu Market: One of Bangkok's oldest markets in Thonburi. Nowadays, it is well known for street food
- Tha Din Daeng Market: Like the Talat Phlu, it is across the Chao Phraya River from Sampheng.
- Wongwian Yai Market: Near Wongwian Yai and Wongwian Yai Railway Station.
- Bang Khun Si Market: Near Charansanitwong Halt and Taling Chan Floating Market
- Bang Kapi Market: On the end of Lat Phrao Road opposite to The Mall Bangkapi, Bang Kapi District
- Sala Nam Ron Market and Sala Nam Yen Market: Two adjacent markets on Sutthawat Road between Bangkok Noi Railway Station and Charansanitwong Halt.
- Saphan Pla Krung Thep Market: The only fish market in Bangkok, on Charoen Krung 58 Alley in Yannawa area of Sathon District, operated by the Fish Marketing Organization.
- Bangkok Noi and Phran Nok Markets: Two adjacent markets on Itsaraphap Road near Phran Nok and Ban Noen intersections including Bangkok Noi railway station
- Sri Yan Market: On Nakhon Chai Si Road in Dusit District between Thewet and Bang Krabue intersections and near Ratchawat intersection
- Bang Bon Market or Ekkachai Market and Sirichai Market: Two adjacent markets on Ekkachai Road.
- Maha Nak Market or Saphan Khao Market: A wholesale fruit market diagonally from Bobae Market.
- Talat Kao or Old Market: An ancient wet market of Yaowarat and Sampheng areas, located in Soi Yaowarat 11. It will be very popular especially during Chinese festivals such as Chinese New Year, Ghost Festival, Vegetarian Festival etc.
- Talat Mai or Leng Buai Ia Market: A wet market opposite Talat Kao, located in Soi Yaowarat 6 or Soi Charoen Krung 16 (Trok Issaranuphap), a narrow lane about 4 m (13 ft) wide, its name after Leng Buai Ia Shrine, the oldest Chinese joss house in Thailand which is in the market area. It is as popular as Talat Kao.
- Talat Krom Phutharet: Another wet market hidden itself in Talat Mai.
- Ying Charoen Market: A large wet market in the area of Saphan Mai in Bang Khen District, Bangkok north side, fresh food, dried food, 24-hour food court
- Thewet Market or Thewarat Market: A large wet market near Thewet Narumitr Bridge, the first bridge that over Khlong Phadung Krung Kasem on Samsen Road overlap between Wat Sam Phraya, Phra Nakhon District and Dusit, Dusit District close to Sri Yan Market. Fresh and dried food, vegetables, seafood, clothing, ready to eat, as well as living fish for release for making merit and potted plants and flowers.
- Iam Sombat Market: Halal food centre and a large wet market in On Nut-Suan Luang neighbourhood on the eastern suburb Bangkok. Accessible by Si Nut MRT station.
- Simum Muang Market: A large wholesale fruit and vegetables in Khu Khot area near Don Mueang International Airport.
- Tai Market: Wholesale agricultural products 24 hours to start trading since 1995 before the official opening in 1997, most greengrocers move from Pak Khlong Market in 1995 like Simum Muang Market. Near Rangsit

== Floating markets ==
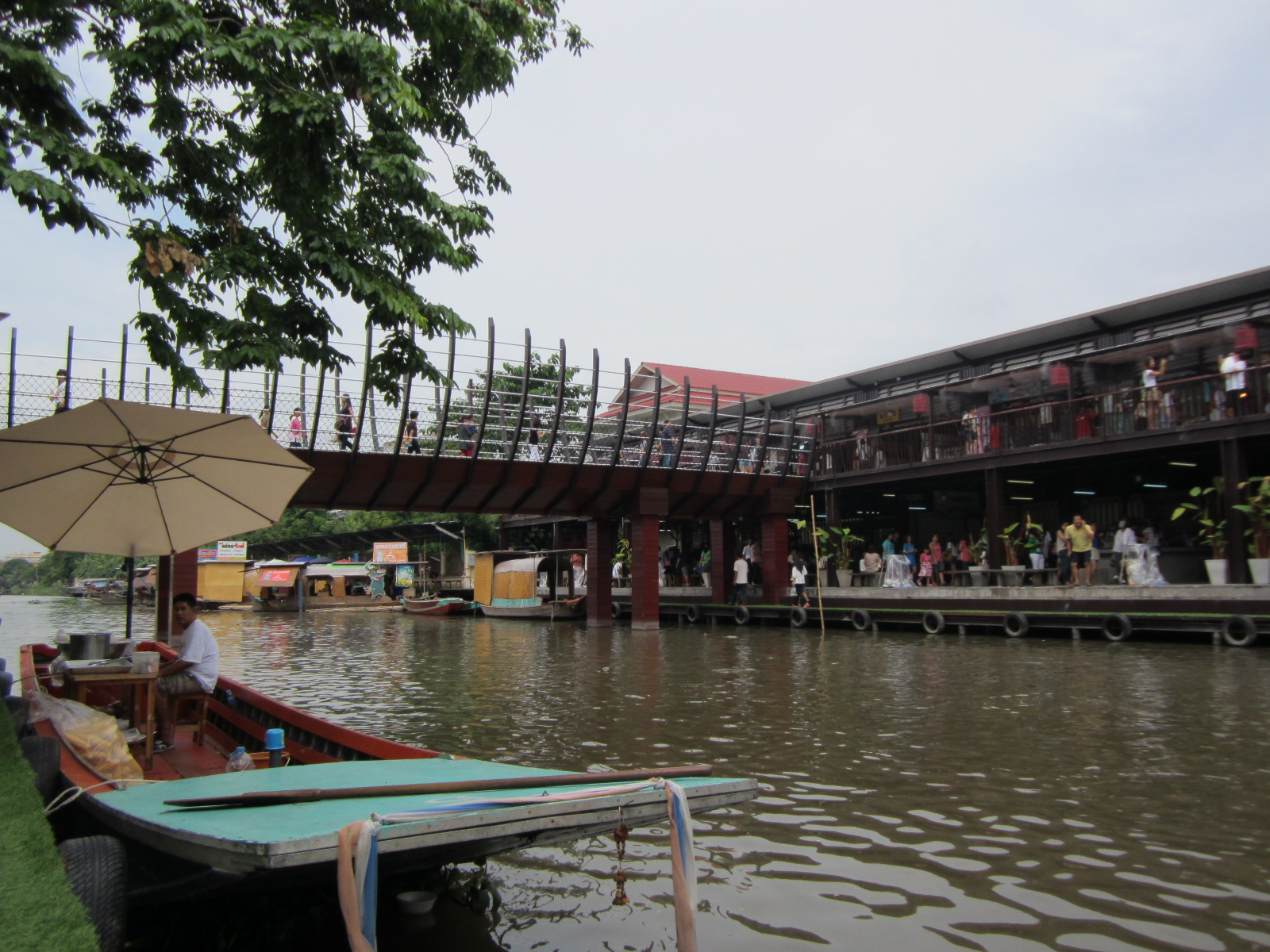
Kwan Riam Floating Market

- Taling Chan Floating Market
- Khlong Lat Mayom Floating Market
- Bang Namphueng Floating Market
- Kwan Riam Floating Market
- Or Tor Kor Floating Market: A new fake floating market is set up in Klong Bang Sue within Or Tor Kor Market, Chatuchak District.
- Sainoi Floating Market: A waterside market in the area of Wat Sai Yai by the Khlong Phra Phimon in Sai Noi District, Nonthaburi Province, northern outskirts Bangkok.

== Former markets ==
- Khlong Lod Market: Night market near Sanam Luang, new and second-hand cheap clothing, shoes, jeans, toys.
- Saphan Phut Night Market: Near Saphan Phut (Memorial Bridge) and Pak Khlong Market, new and second-hand cheap clothes, shoes, jeans, toys like Khlong Lod Market. Now it has moved to set up on Somdet Chaopraya Road.
- Sam Yan Market: On Sam Yan Intersection, in the 1960s it covered both sides of Phaya Thai Road.
- Khlong Thom Market: Weekend market near Yaowarat. Tools, toys and porn videos.
- Saphan Lek Market: Weekend market near Khlong Thom Market. Tools, toys and video games.
- Thieves' Market: aka Nakhon Khasem, one of Bangkok's oldest markets and communities, close to Khlong Thom Market.
- Sripaisit Night Bazaar: (Siam Paradise Night Bazaar) Trendy clothing, shoes, handicraft, souvenirs.
- Suan Lum Night Bazaar: Trendy lifestyle items.
- Saturday Market: A large ornamental fish center in paired with Sunday Market, operated around 1999–2000s. They are opposite each other, just between Kamphaeng Phet 2 Road.
- Tha Chang Market: Next to the Grand Palace. New and second-hand small goods, amulets, traditional medicines.
- Tha Pra Chan Market: On the Chao Phraya River, sells amulets.
- Khlong Phadung Krung Kasem Floating Market: On Khlong Phadung Krung Kasem near Government House. Operated between 2015 and 2017.
- Wat Sai Floating Market: In the past, around 1960s used to be the bustling and the most renowned floating market of Bangkok. Currently, it is only a legend.
- Maha Nakhon Floating Market: a floating market in Lat Krabang District, east suburb Bangkok.
- Wat Nimmanoradee Floating Market: a floating market on the border of Phasi Charoen and Bang Khae Districts.
- Indy Market: Night flea market selling craft wares, clothing, and many street foods on Suk Sawat Road near Dao Khanong area, with the location around 10 rai (1.6 ha; 4.0 acres), more than 500 shops divided into different zones clearly.

== See also ==
- History of marketing
- Market (place)
- Market town
- Retail
