= Soi Lalai Sap =

Street in Bangkok, Thailand

Coordinates: 13°43′34″N 100°31′47.3″E

Surasena Alley or Soi Surasena (Thai: ซอยสุรเสนา), or officially known as Soi Si Lom 5 (ซอยสีลม 5), and commonly known as Soi Lalai Sap (ซอยละลายทรัพย์, pronounced [sɔ̄ːj lā.lāːj sáp]; lit. 'melted money alley') is a side-street (soi) branching off Si Lom Road in the Bang Rak District of Bangkok, Thailand. It is the home of many stores, air-conditioned shophouses, mini malls, food courts and stalls, and sidewalk vendors, which sell a variety of goods such as men's and women's clothes, souvenirs, handicrafts and many kinds of food.

The name "Surasena" after Phraya Surasena (พระยาสุรเสนา) a Thai aristocrat, who used to have house in the neighbourhood. Currently much of the area is now covered by the large headquarters of Bangkok Bank, which stands at the side of Soi Lalai Sap.

The stores and traders have occupied this soi since 1983, increasing in popularity over time.

Currently, It is known as a shopping center like Pratunam Market or JJ Market, but there is less area. It is very popular among employees of various office companies nearby, especially during lunch break. It is also not far from other shopping and attraction areas such as Silom, Patpong or Thaniya.

== See also ==
- List of markets in Bangkok
