= Joe Louis Puppet Theatre =

Traditional Thai Hun Lakorn Lek marionette show

The Joe Louis Puppet Theatre or Nattayasala Hun Lakhon Lek (Thai: นาฏยศาลา หุ่นละครเล็ก), is the traditional Thai Hun Lakorn Lek marionette show originating in 1898, which was modeled from the Siamese court puppetries aged 1782 CE with the Chinese Glove puppetry influence at the Front Palace of Siamese Prince Wichaichan. It was first founded in 1985 under the name Sakorn Natasilp by Sakorn Yang-keawsot, later the Joe Louis Puppet Theatre, and publicly performed by request of the Tourism Authority of Thailand (TAT). Later, the Joe Louis Puppet Theatre bestowed the official name as the Nattayasala Hun Lakhon Lek (Joe Louis) theatre and was patronized by Princess Galyani Vadhana.

== History ==
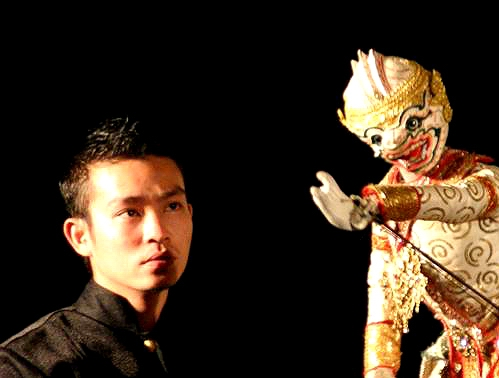
Hun lakorn lek puppetry by Joe Louis's troupe

The Joe Louis Puppet Theatre specializes in Hun Lakorn Lek—a small dance drama three dimensional rod puppet in which three puppeteers hold over 50 centimeters up to one meter-tall doll puppets with strings attached to each part of the doll's body, allowing the puppeteers to control it in remarkable lifelike movements. One person controls the head and right arm, another has the torso and left arm, and the final puppeteer controls the feet. The small puppets were initially invented in Bangkok from 1898 to 1901 by Siamese aristocrat Krae Suppavanich (1847–1929) from Phra Nakhon Si Ayutthaya province, in the reign of King Rama VI by modeling them from the Chinese Glove puppetry influence and the Siamese court puppetries (hun luang) aged 1782 CE enshrined in the Front Palace of Siamese Prince Wichaichan. In the past, most of the Joe Louis Puppets mainly performed with the traditional story of the Ramakien—the Thai version of the Ramayana; the modern puppets have adopted many contemporary figures such as the well-known pop music star; Michael Jackson or Elvis Presley.

Right before Krae Suppavanich's death, he threw most of his puppets into the Chao Phraya River to prevent others from copying his artistic works; however, there were still thirty puppets left at that time. After Krae Suppavanich died in 1929, the troupe was taken over by his daughter-in-law, Ya Yip, as the second-generation leader of the troupe; it still performed on a smaller scale than the previous due to fewer performances and puppets being left. A few years after Ya Yip died, the troupe performance was discontinued. According to the Siam National Cultural Policy of 1942 CE, performances with foreign origins were prohibited, resulting in many artists in Siam throwing their artistic works in rivers or hiding them to avoid punishment.

From the 1970s, there were thirty puppets in damaged condition that became an inherited property of Sakorn Yang-keawsot (also known as Joe Louis) in Nonthaburi province, whose father performed with the troupe. However, he sold many damaged puppets to the Ancient City Company and decided to revive the form and reproduce the missing puppets.

In 1985, Sakorn Yang-keawsot officially founded the puppet theatre in Bangkok under the name Sakorn Natasilp (Thai: คณะสาครนาฏศิลป์), literally the Sakorn Theatrical Troupe. The theater name was often called by his alias name, Joe Louis, instead, which came from a monk who called him Liw or weeping willow by the beliefs of ancient Siamese people used to treat certain diseases that were prevalent at that time. Soon after, the name Liw became Louis, and the name Joe was added due to his fondness for American boxer Joe Louis. Hence, the name Joe Louis became Sakorn Yang-keawsot's theatre instead of the official name Sakorn Natasilp that was adopted by his theatre, the Joe Louis Puppet Theatre.

From 1985, the Tourism Authority of Thailand (TAT) promoted Sakorn Yang-keawsot's theatre, the Joe Louis company, from a quaint entertainment to a marker of Thai identity and culture and requested him for puppet performances in a festival targeting tourists. Sakorn Yang-keawsot developed some unique and specialized features of his style called Hun Lakorn Lek—a small dance drama three dimensional rod puppet, combining dances and dynamic synchronized movements maneuvering of puppets by incorporating the Khon drama dance into the puppetries.

In the mid-1990s, the Joe Louis Theatre transformed into commercial entertainment in response to the growing tourist market, and Sakorn Yang-keawsot was consecrated as the National Artist (Thailand) in the Performing art field (Marionette Show) in 1996. Soon after, the Joe Louis company had expanded even further; they were no longer just family members. The Joe Louis Theatre has occupied three primary locations: a small theatre near Sakorn Yang-keawsot's home, the center of Bangkok, and Nonthaburi on the outskirts of Bangkok.

In May 1999, the Joe Louis Puppet Theatre home suffered from a fire that destroyed fifty puppets. Later, the Thailand National Culture Commission, Ministry of Culture (Thailand), and devotees donated funds allowing the Joe Louis Puppet Theatre to restore the puppets with offices and rehearsal space.

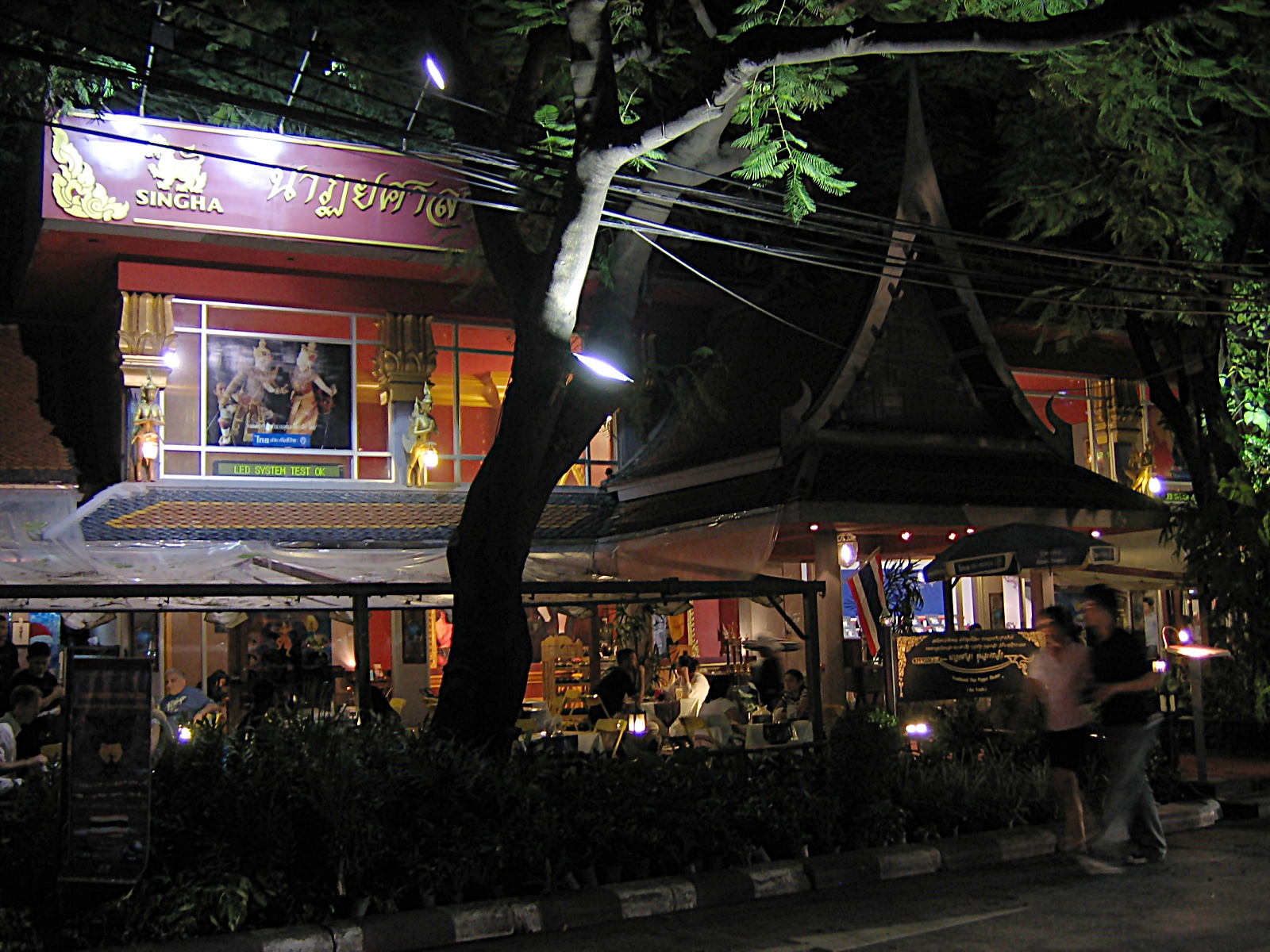
The Joe Louis Puppet Theatre in Suan Lum Night Bazaar, Bangkok.

In 2000, the Joe Louis Puppet Theatre moved into the center city in Bangkok and rented a theatre at the Suan Lum Night Bazaar owned by the Crown Property Bureau (CPB).

In 2004, Princess Galyani Vadhana, the elder sister to King Ananda Mahidol and King Bhumibol Adulyadej, bestowed the official name of the Joe Louis Puppet Theatre to Nattayasala Hun Lakhon Lek (Thai: นาฏยศาลา หุ่นละครเล็ก), literally the Traditional Thai Puppet Theatre.

In 2006 to 2008, the Joe Louis Puppet Theatre participated in the contest at the XXII International Festival of Puppet Art in Prague, Czech Republic, and won first place in the Best Traditional Performance award. The Joe Louis Puppet Theatre again participated in the same contest and won first place in the Prague Contemporary Art Festival 2008. Recently, the Joe Louis Puppet Theatre has also toured Europe and Australia.

In 2010, the renting contract between the Nattayasala Hun Lakhon Lek Theatre (Joe Louis) and the Suan Lum Night Bazaar expired. The theatre had to permanently move to the Asiatique The RiverFront night market in Bangkok.

In the present, the Nattayasala Hun Lakhon Lek Theatre (Joe Louis) still performs at various events both domestically and internationally and is a national art of Thailand heritage.

== Type of plays ==
The Joe Louis Puppet Theatre features the plays:

- Traditional Thai Small Theater Puppet (hun lakorn lek).
- Thai Human Puppet (Human puppet controlled by a human).

== Awards ==
- 2006 – Best Traditional Performance Award (First place), the XXII International Festival of Puppetry Art, Prague.
- 2008 – Best Traditional Performance Award (First place), the Prague Contemporary Art Festival 2008.

== See also ==
- Hun lakhon lek
- Dance in Thailand

== External resources ==
- Yamashita, M. (2005). The Survival of the Joe Louis Theater : Theater Management. The Master's thesis. Chulalongkorn University, Bangkok. doi:10.14457/CU.the.2005.1819
- Thai Puppets.
- Joe Louis Puppet Theatre Facebook Fan Page.
