= Pattavikorn Market =

Retail market in Bangkok, Thailand

Coordinates: 13°48′50.14″N 100°39′7.06″E

Pattavikorn Market (Thai: ตลาดปัฐวิกรณ์, pronounced [tà.làːt pàt.tʰá.wí.kɔ̄ːn]) is one of the largest and best-known second-hand clothing markets in Bangkok. Located between Soi Nawamin 70 and 72 in Nuan Chan sub-district, Bueng Kum district on the eastern side of the city, the market consists of several zones dedicated to used goods, with prices starting from as low as 5 baht per item.

The market is organized into thematic sections, offering a range of second-hand clothing, brand-name garments and bags, electronic devices, home decorations, vintage goods, and other used items. Some stalls display action figures from anime series such as Saint Seiya and Dragon Ball, which were popular in the 1980s and 1990s, along with collectibles and retro memorabilia. Bottled drinks and sweet snacks are also sold in this area.

A newly constructed project within the market grounds presents a more structured layout. This section differs from the older part in terms of stall arrangement and spatial organization. Products found here include band T-shirts, anime-themed shirts, and cartoon-printed clothing, all categorized and systematically displayed. Ready-to-eat food is also available in this newer area.

The market operates daily from 1:00 p.m. to 8:00 p.m., with extended hours on weekends from 10:30 a.m. to 9:30 p.m. More people tend to visit on Saturdays and Sundays, when a larger number of vendors are also present.

== See also ==
- List of markets in Bangkok
