= Wat Nimmanoradi =

- Wat Nim
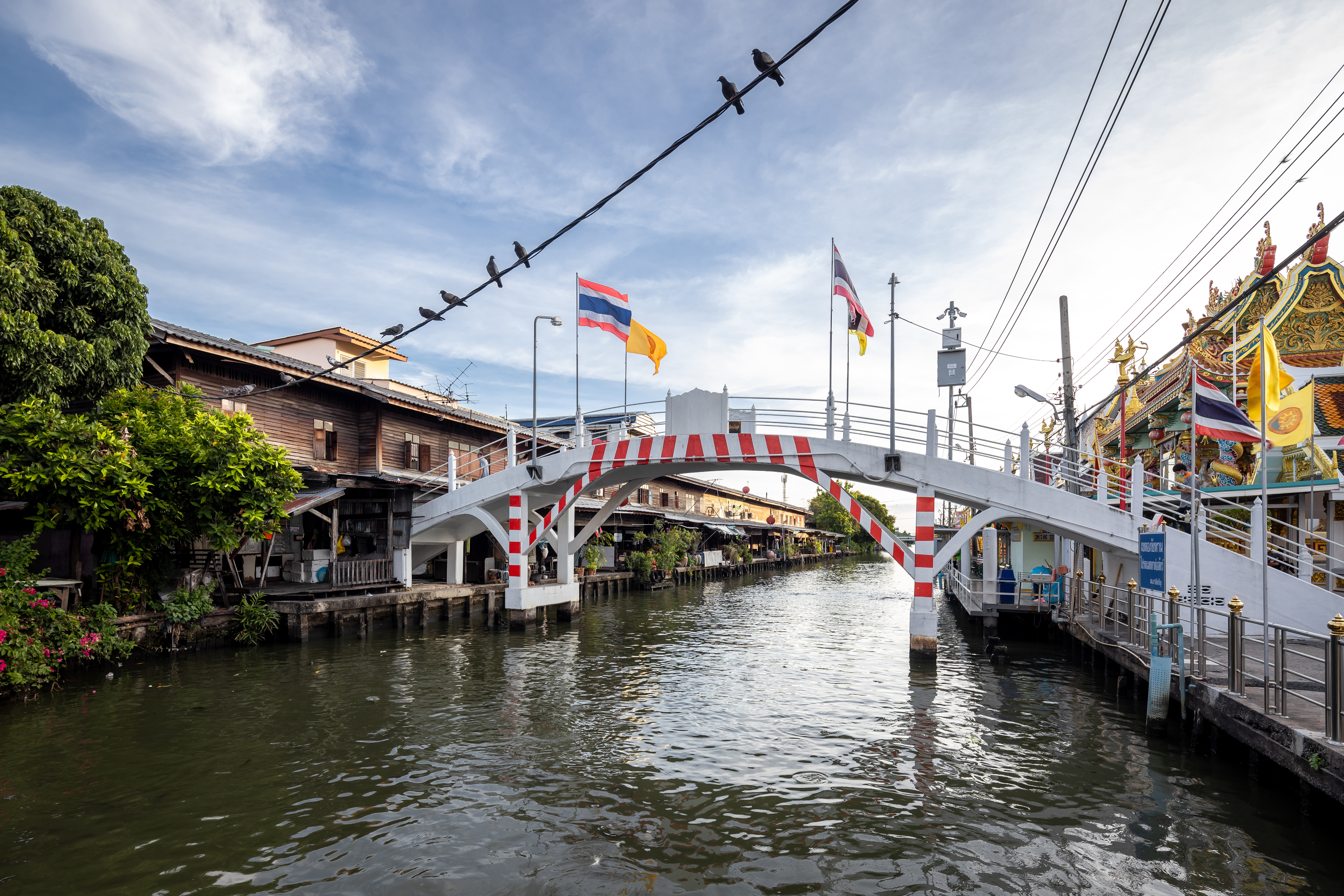
- Khlong Phasi Charoen and Wat Nimmannoradi (right side)

- Location within Bangkok

Religion
- Affiliation: Buddhism
- Sect: Theravāda, Mahā Nikāya
- Status: Third grade royal monastery

Location
- Location: 845 Soi Bang Khae 1, Bang Khae Rd., Bang Wa, Phasi Charoen, Bangkok
- Country: Thailand
- Interactive map of Wat Nimmanoradi
- Coordinates: 13.70853°N 100.42686°E

Architecture
- Founder: Unknown

Wat Nimmanoradi (Thai: วัดนิมมานรดี, pronounced [wát.nìm.māːn.ná.rā.dīː], also written as Nimma Noradi, Nimmanoradee) is a Thai Buddhist temple in Bangkok. It is a third grade royal monastery by the canals Khlong Phasi Charoen and Khlong Ratcha Montri on the border of Phasi Charoen area, just across the canal of Khlong Ratcha Montri is Bang Khae area. Therefore, this temple is often mistaken for its location in district of Bang Khae.

Its former name was Wat Bang Khae and it believed to be built during the early of Rattanakosin period around 1807. In the reign of King Rama I, Wat Bang Khae was very prosperous but later it deteriorated. In 1872 during the reign of King Rama V, the abbot Chaeng a Buddhist monk had transferred from Wat Rakhang and ruled the temple, and Khun Tan Wanochakorn (Nim) with his wife named Di who were wealthy people became the patrons and renovated the temple completely.

After the renovation the temple was renamed to Wat Nimmanoradi like today (Nimmanoradi is the name of the fifth of six heavenly realm, according to the belief in Buddhist cosmology) and received Wisungkhammasima (boundary in the temple which was given by the King) on May 13, 1879. Later, when the construction of the new ordination hall was completed, it received a new Wisungkhammasima on November 8, 1971.

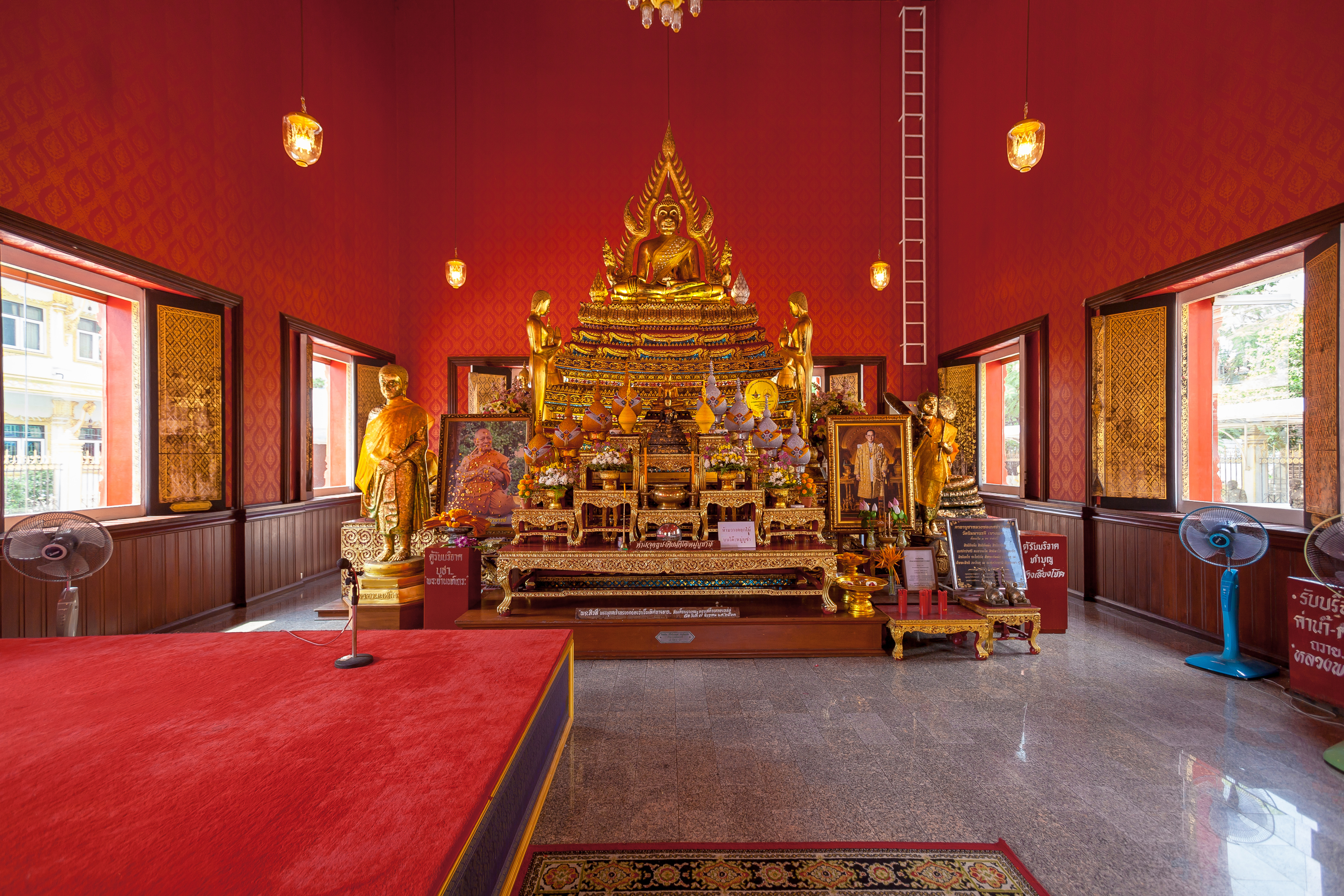
Luang Pho Ket Champa Si

There is the Thai monogram of King Rama IX, "Phor Por Ror" (ภ.ป.ร.) on the gable of the new ordination hall. The dwelling for monks and Thai-style sermon hall were all built from teak wood. There is also a stūpa where the holy relic of Lord Buddha was put inside. This stūpa was built in 1974, Princess Maha Chakri Sirindhorn came to solemnize raising Chatra (tiered umbrella) ceremony on December 7, 1980. Inside the ordination hall, there is a principal Buddha image in Māravijaya posture, made of mixed brass and gilded lacquering named Luang Pho Ket Champa Si (หลวงพ่อเกศจำปาศรี). In addition, there are also various idols of Chinese god such as Guanyin, Kātyāyana to be worshiped as well.

In the past, the areas along Khlong Phasi Charoen and Khlong Ratcha Montri, around the temple, were home to a bustling community and a lively floating market. Many merchants rowed their boats from places such as Ban Phaeo, Samut Sakhon, Damnoen Saduak, Ratchaburi to trade here. The construction of Phetkasem Road (Highway 4) through the area eventually changed the local way of life, causing the market to move onto land and become what is now Bang Khae Market. At one point, the Phasi Charoen District Office attempted to revive the floating market as Wat Nimmanoradee Floating Market, but it was short-lived and has since closed.

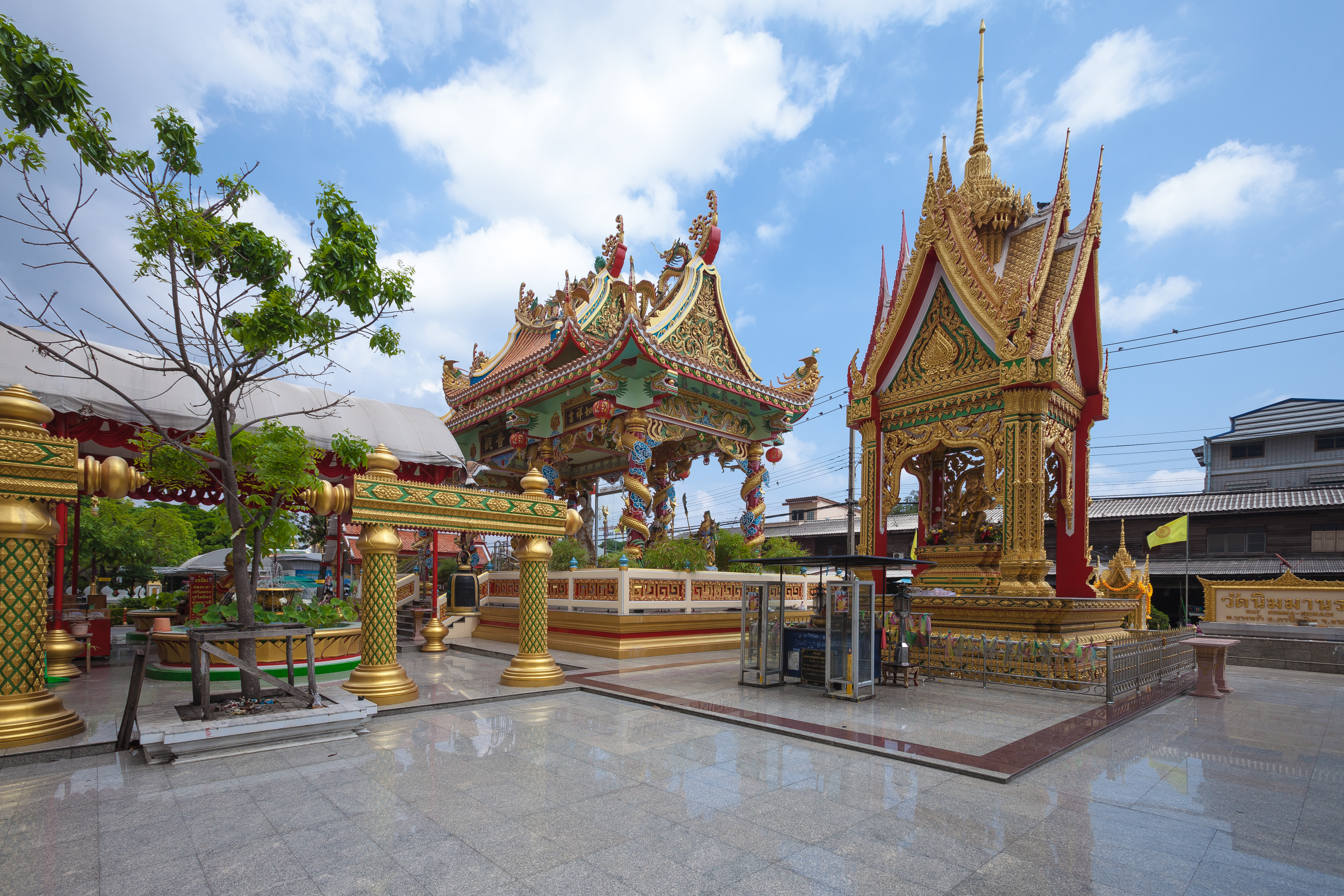
Shrines

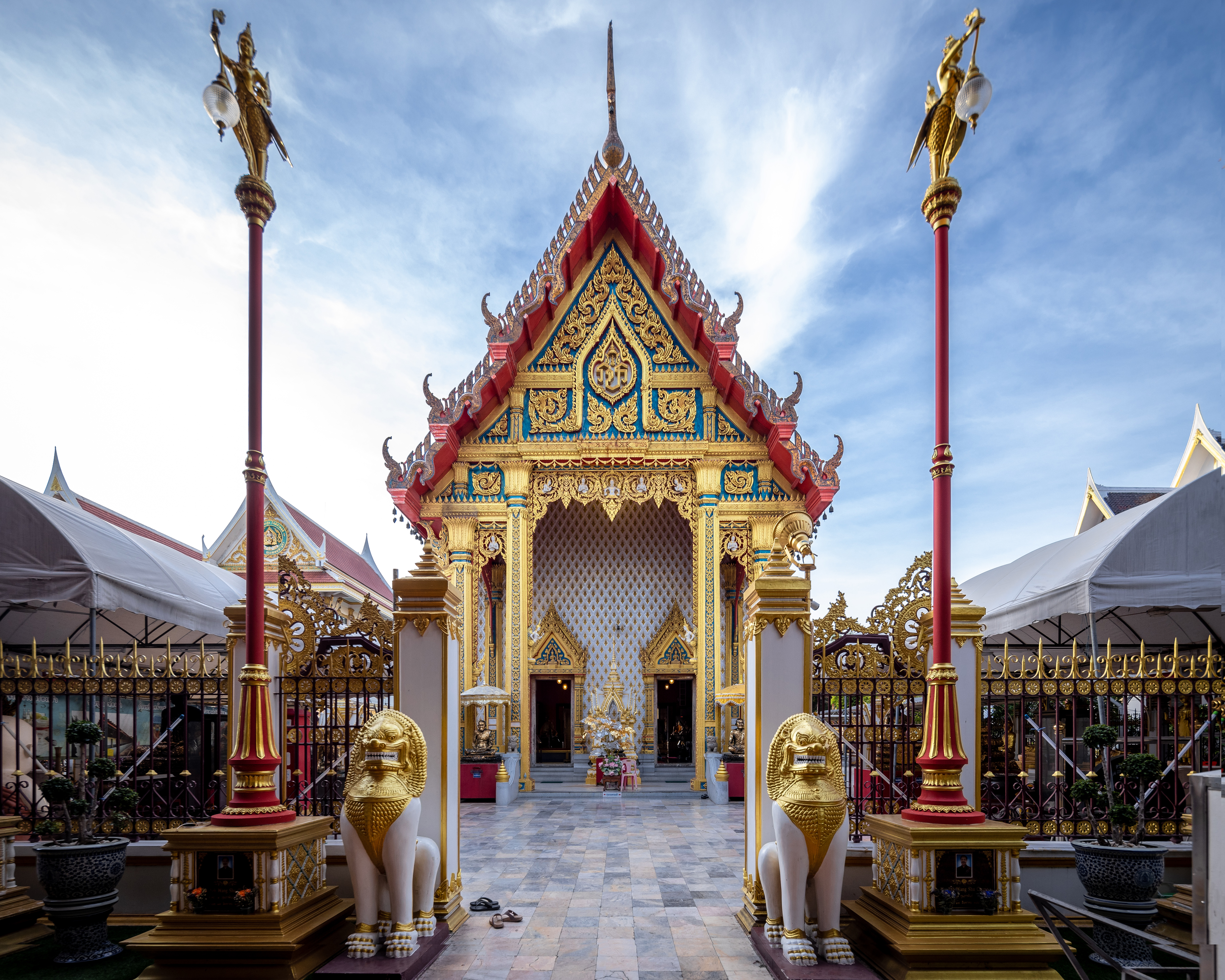
Ubosot

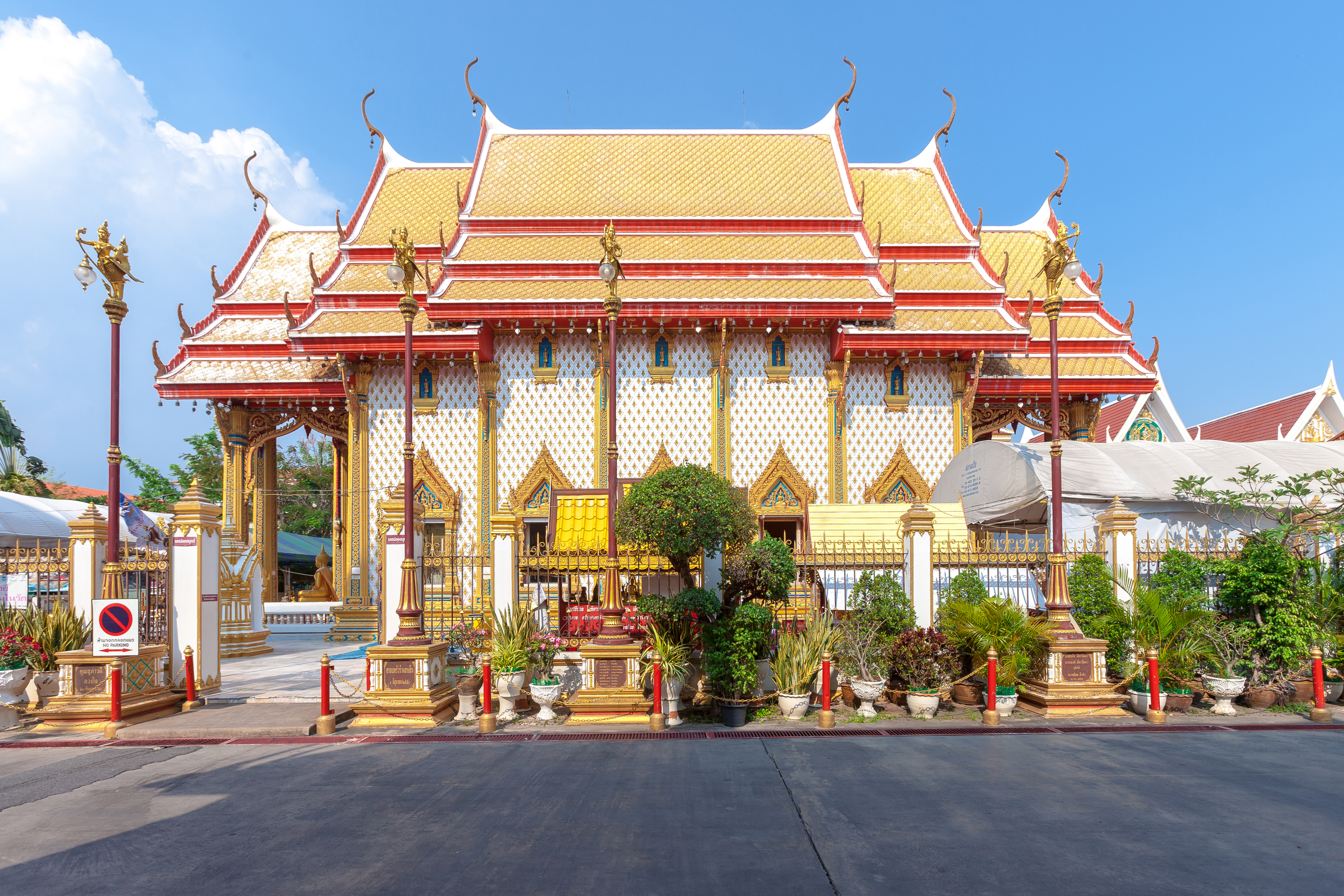
Ubosot

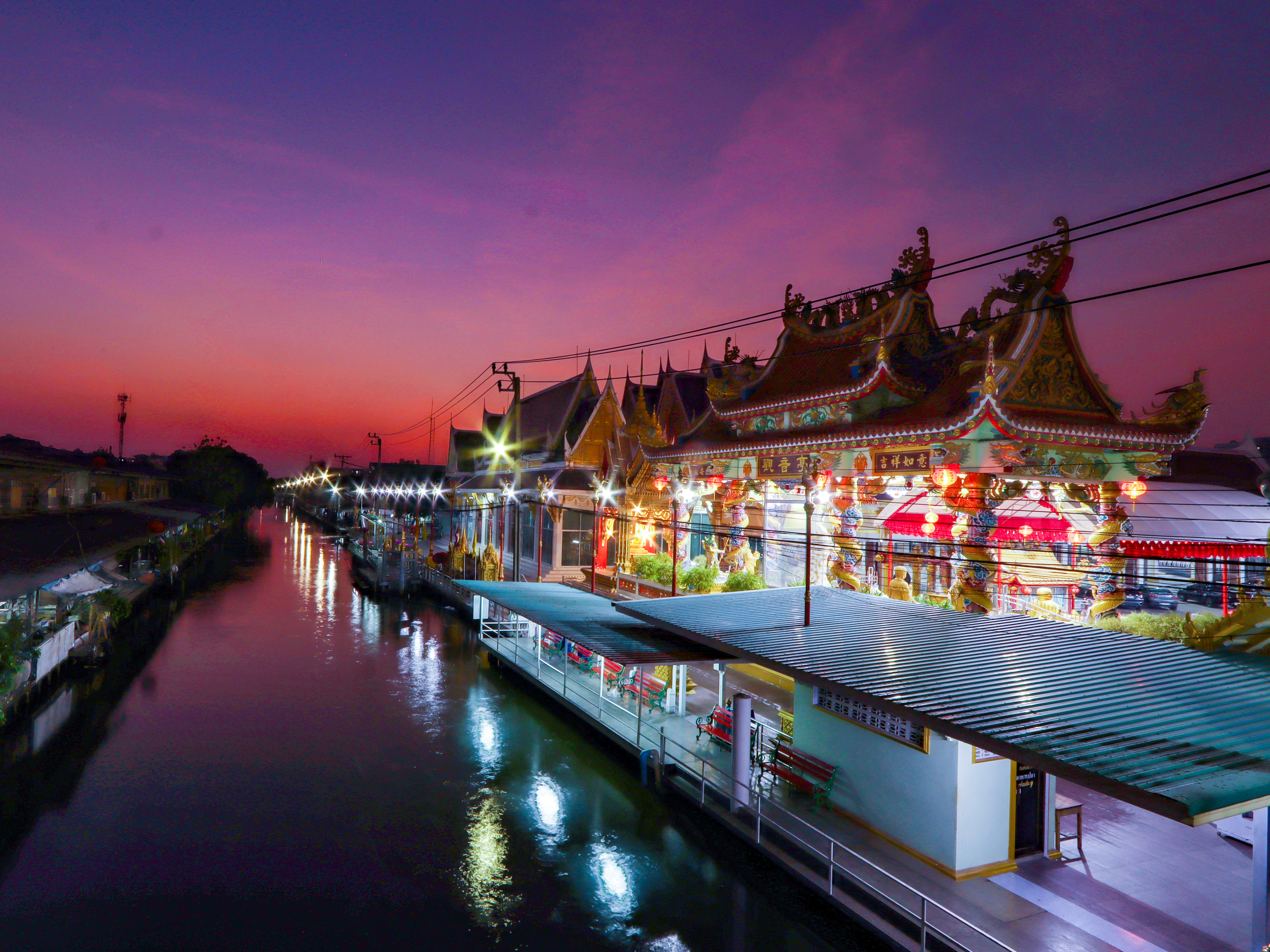
Canal view
