= Sakorn Yang-keawsot =

Thai puppeteer

Sakorn Yangkheiosot (Thai: สาคร ยังเขียวสด; 1922 in Nonthaburi Province – May 21, 2007 in Bangkok, Thailand) was a Thai puppeteer. He was a master of the hun lakorn lek (traditional Thai small puppets). Also known by his English nickname, Joe Louis, in 1965 he founded the Sakorn Hunlakornlek troupe with his daughter, Thitawan Yangkheiosod. Later, in 2001, his son, Pisutr Yangkheiosot formed a new troupe named Joe Louis and founded Joe Louis Puppet Theatre under his acknowledgment. He was named a National Artist for performing arts in 1996.

== Biography ==
Sakorn was born in 1922 to parents who were both khon (masked drama) performers and puppeteers in the troupe of Krae Suppavanich. Sakorn performed in a likay (Thai folk opera) troupe as comedian, but also learned puppetry from Krae. He adapted and improved upon Krae's large hun luang (royal puppets) and revived the art of the hun lakorn lek puppets, which were not as detailed as the larger puppets but allowed for more mobility and lifelike movements. As many as three puppeteers would be used to control the moves of one puppet.

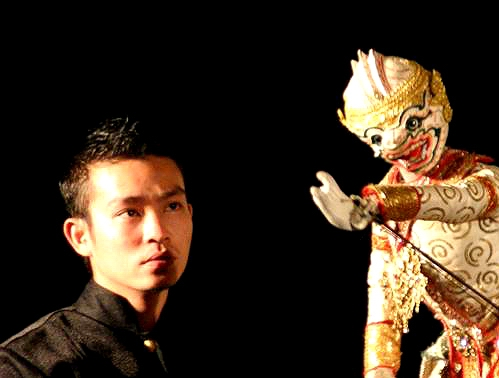
Hun lakorn lek puppetry by Joe Louis's troupe

His puppet troupe was popular in the years following the Second World War, and it was during this time he was given the nickname Joe Louis, taking the name from a mispronunciation of his Thai nickname, "Liew", and in honor of the American heavyweight boxing champion. He revived the art of Thai puppetry, which dates back to the 11th century, but struggled to keep the artform relevant as Thailand modernized. In 1985, he formed the Joe Louis Puppet Theatre with his children, performing adaptations of epic Thai literature, such as the Ramakien, with his puppets constructed from light wood, papier-mâché and fabric. The performances are accompanied by a piphat (traditional Thai classical music) orchestra.

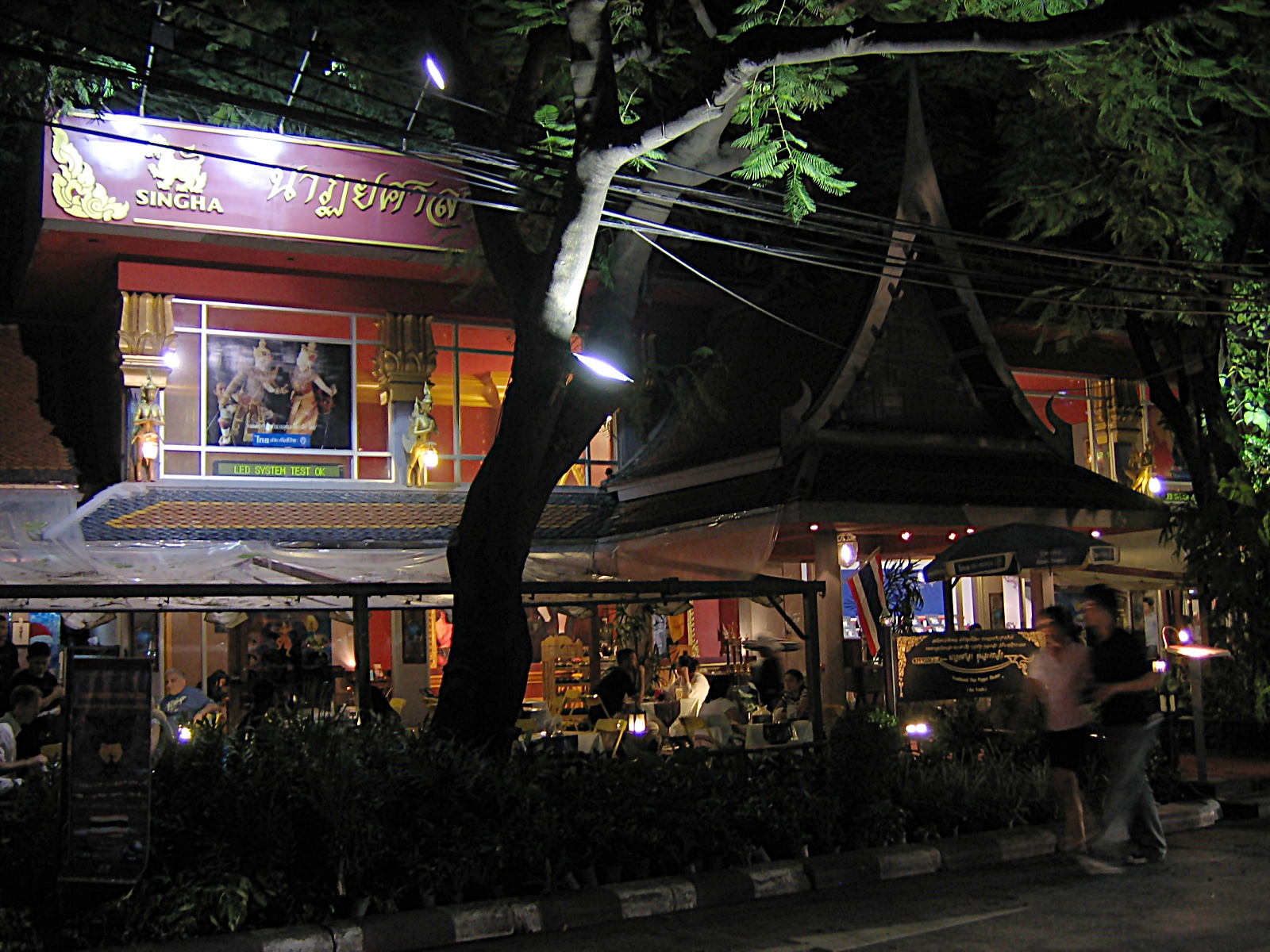
The Joe Louis Puppet Theatre in Suan Lum Night Bazaar, Bangkok.

=== Sakorn Hunlakornlek (JoeLouis) ===
His daughter, Thitawan Yangkheiosod (the leader of the present troupe) and Kru Sakorn Yangkheiosod are the founders of Sakorn Hunlakornlek (JoeLouis) since 1965. Later, in September 2007, Sakorn Hunlakornlek (JoeLouis) owned the performance of Hunlakornlek in the 578-seat Aksara Grand Theatre at the King Power Complex on Soi Langnam, Bangkok, Thailand. And Sakorn Hunlakornlek is still stand till these days with the effort to distribute the art of traditional Thai puppet performance to next generations.

=== Joe Louis Puppet Theatre ===
From 2001, his Joe Louis Puppet Theatre put on nightly shows in the Suan Lum Night Bazaar in Bangkok. The troupe nearly collapsed in 2004 when it could not afford the rent of its venue, but was saved after a public outcry and funds were raised. At the time of Sakorn's death in 2007, the future of the Suan Lum Night Bazaar was in doubt.

Sakorn had nine children. His son, Pisutr Yangkheiosot led the Joe Louis Puppet Theatre, which won the "Best Traditional Performance Award" at the 10th World Festival of Puppet Art in Prague in June 2006.

Sakorn suffered from lung disease and kidney failure and had been admitted to Kasemrad Rattanathibet Hospital on 9 May. He was discharged on 18 May because he wanted to return home, but was re-admitted on 20 May and was being treated in its intensive care unit at the time of his death. Funeral rites were at Wat Bangpai in Bang Bua Thong, Nonthaburi Province.
