= Bang Khae Market =

Coordinates: 13°42′42.97″N 100°25′24.26″E

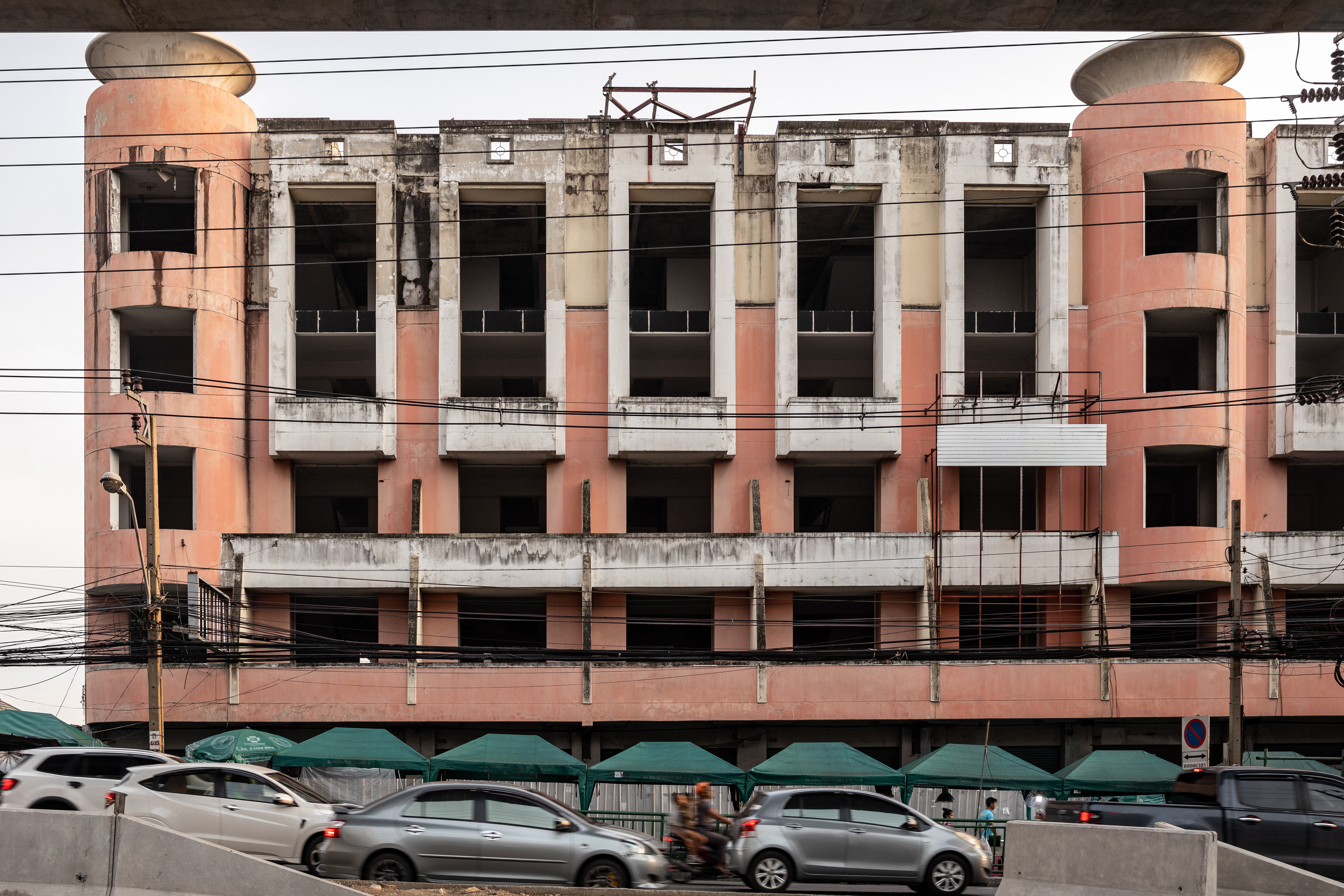
Rank of empty shophouses along Phet Kasem Road by Khlong Ratcha Montri in Bang Khae Market

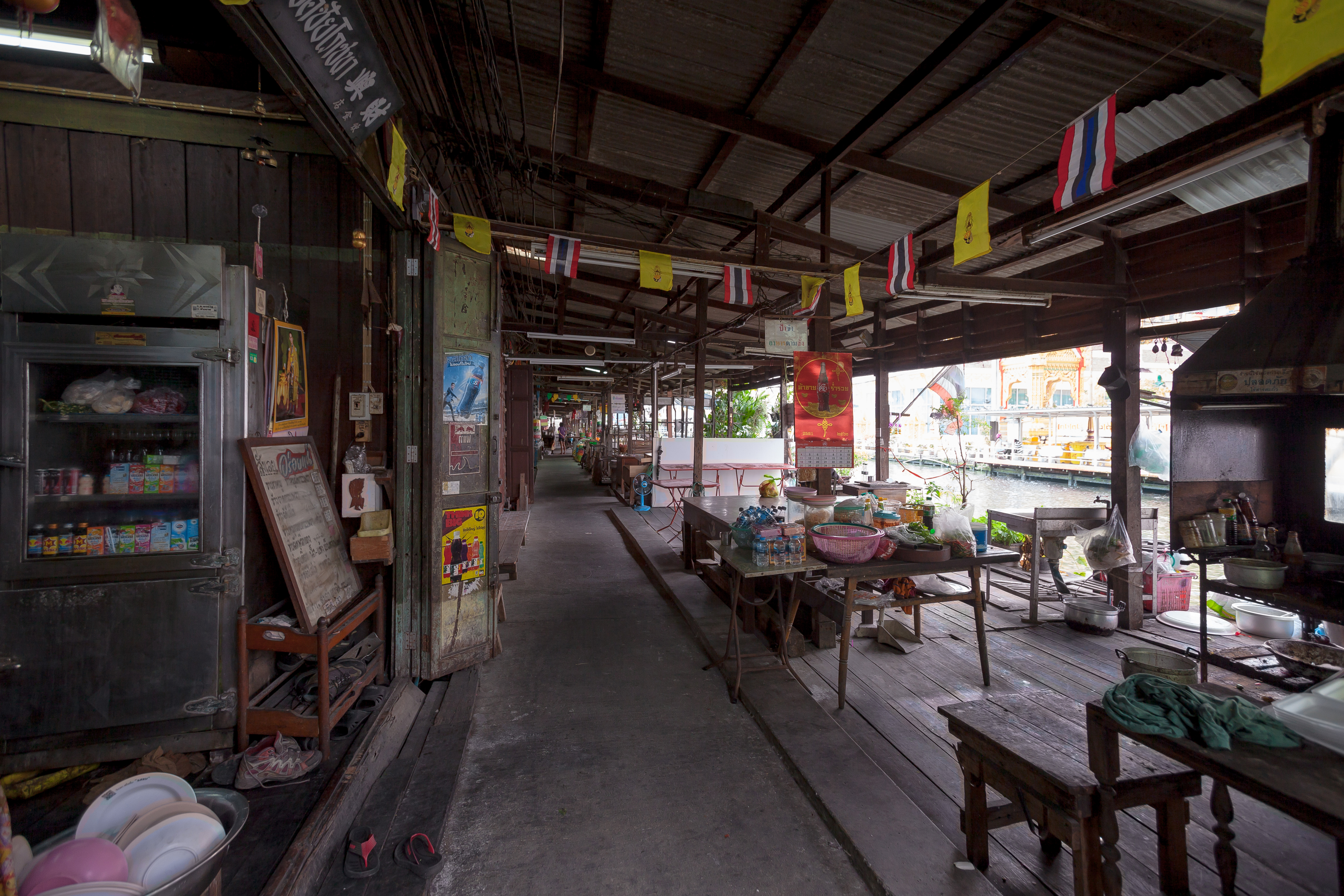
Wat Nimmanoradi Floating Market, it was once part of the Bang Khae Market, but closed down currently

Bang Khae Market or Bang Khae Wet Market (Thai: ตลาดบางแค, RTGS: Talat Bang Khae, pronounced [tā.làːt bāːŋ kʰɛː], ตลาดสดบางแค, RTGS: Talat Sot Bang Khae, pronounced [tā.làːt sòt bāːŋ kʰɛː]) is a large wet market in Bangkok, its one of the largest markets of Thonburi side and Bangkok, located on Phet Kasem Road mostly in Bang Khae District.

== History ==
Bang Khae Market is a market located along Khlong Phraya Ratcha Montri, also known simply as Khlong Ratcha Montri. The area stretches from Khwaeng Bang Wa in Phasi Charoen District to Khwaeng Bang Khae in Bang Khae District.

The origins of Bang Khae Market lie in its role as a traditional community hub. In the past, the market thrived as a trading centre where people traveled by boat along Khlong Phasi Charoen and Khlong Bang Khae, making commerce a natural way of life. During that period, the market's boundaries extended as far as Wat Muang in present-day Khwaeng Lak Song.

In 1949, under the government of Field Marshal Plaek Phibunsongkhram, who emphasized cleanliness and discipline in Bangkok, vendors were relocated from various areas in Phra Nakhon (modern-day Bangkok), such as Sanam Luang, the Royal Plaza, Thewet Bridge, Tha Tian Market, Worachak Road (Khlong Thom neighbourhood), and in front of the Samsen Power Plant (now the Metropolitan Electricity Authority Samsen). Bang Khae, then considered a suburban area, was also designated as one of the new trading sites.

Originally, the market was not in its current location. It stood on the inbound side of Phet Kasem Road, diagonally opposite today's site, and was known as Talat Bo Lha. The area is now occupied by The Prodigy Condo MRT Bangkhae.

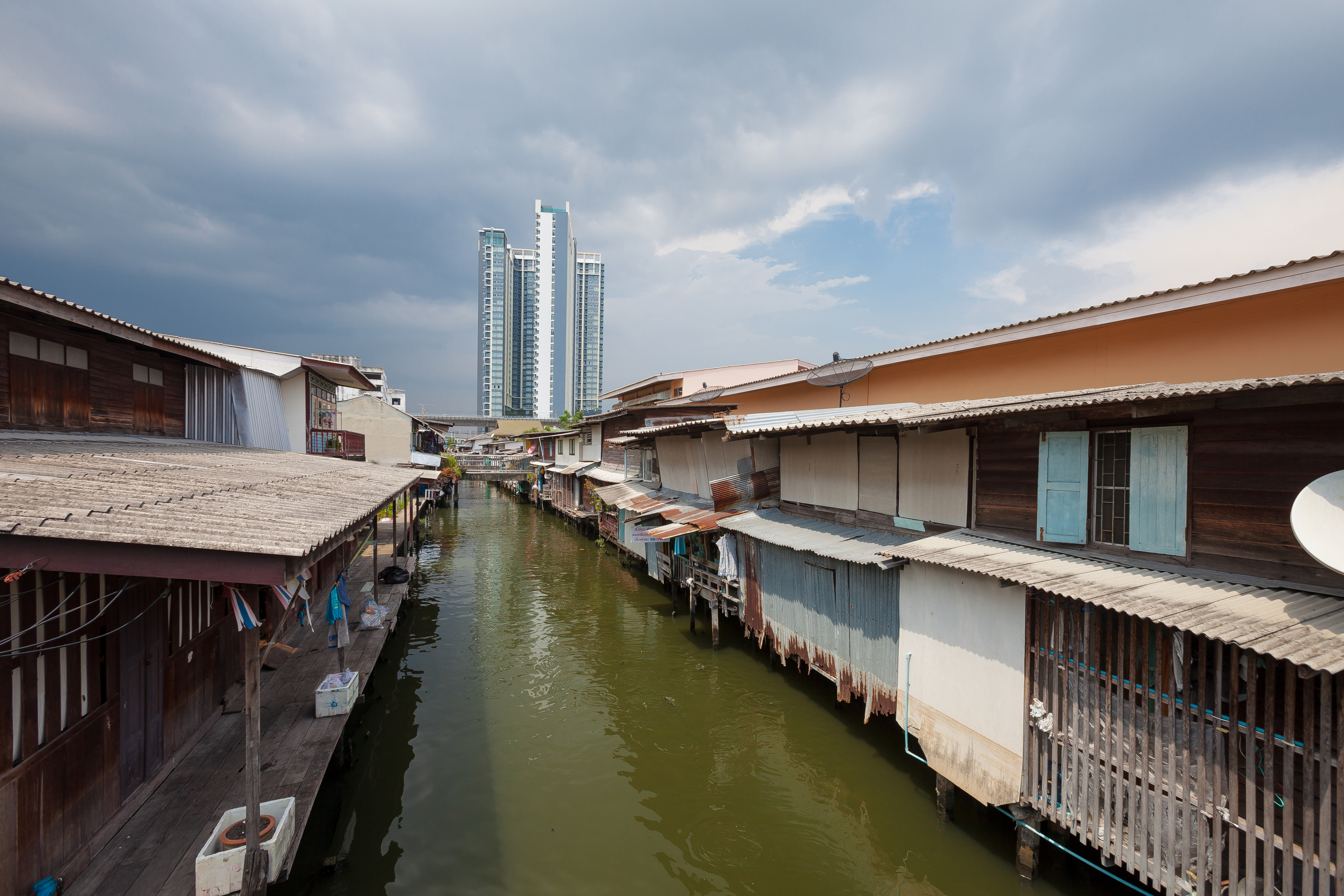
The section of Khlong Ratcha Montri near Bang Khae Market

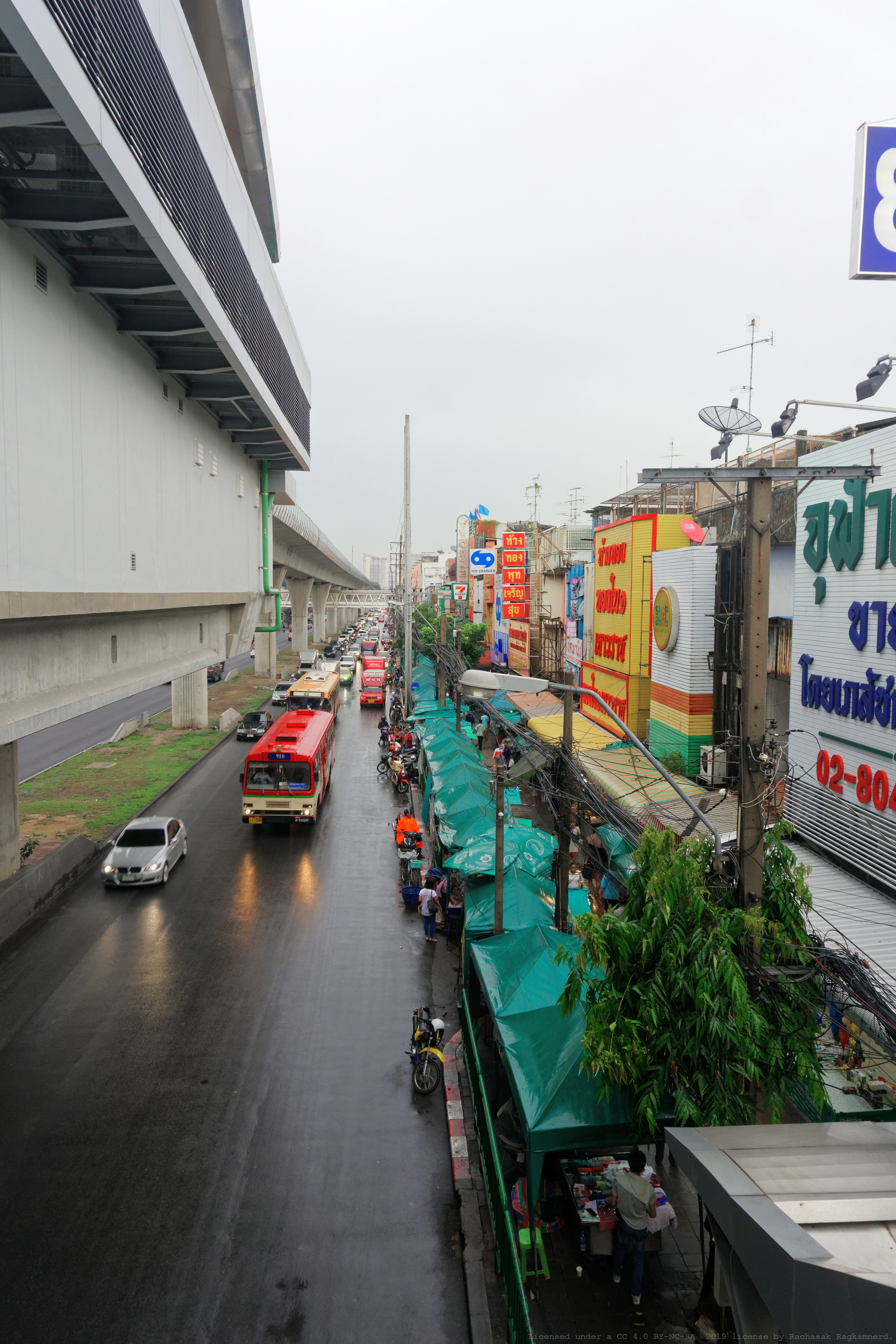
Bang Khae station above Phet Kasem Road (outbound) and Bang Khae Market

== Presently ==
Today, Bang Khae Market is a bustling marketplace that offers a wide variety of goods, ranging from raw meat, fresh seafood, dried food, and ready-to-eat meals to fruits, vegetables, and inexpensive clothing. It is open almost all day and remains lively at all times. The market is divided into five sub-markets, including the Wonder Department Store, a small department store within the area.

This area is also notable as the birthplace of Thongchai "Bird" McIntyre, one of Thailand's most famous music superstars.

In 2012, vendors at Bang Khae Market collectively opposed the construction of the MRT Blue Line, as Bang Khae Station was to be located within the market area. However, their opposition was ultimately unsuccessful.

== Nearby places ==
- Ban Bang Khae (also known as Bang Khae Home for Older Persons)
- Tesco Lotus Bang Khae
- Seacon Bangkae
- The Mall Bang Khae
- Bangkhae Condotown
- Bangkhae Condo Residence
- Wat Nimmanoradi
