= Ratchayothin Market =

Major Ratchayothin Market is a market located next to Major Cineplex Ratchayothin bordering Phahonyothin Road in Chatuchak district, Bangkok, Thailand, opposite the Elephant Building. It is a wholesale market selling inexpensive clothing, fashion accessories and watches.

== Nearby attractions ==
- Major Cineplex Ratchayothin
- SCB Park Plaza
- Tesco Lotus Hypermarket Lat Phrao
- Index Living Mall Phahonyothin

== Transportation ==
The MRT's Phahon Yothin Station, about one kilometer away at Central Plaza Lat Phrao, is the nearest subway station.
Bus number 543 runs by Major Ratchoyothin.

== Operation Hours ==
- 16:00 - 23:00 (every day)

== See also ==
- Bangkok markets
