= Pratunam Market =

Street market in Bangkok, Thailand

Coordinates: 13°45′3″N 100°32′29″E

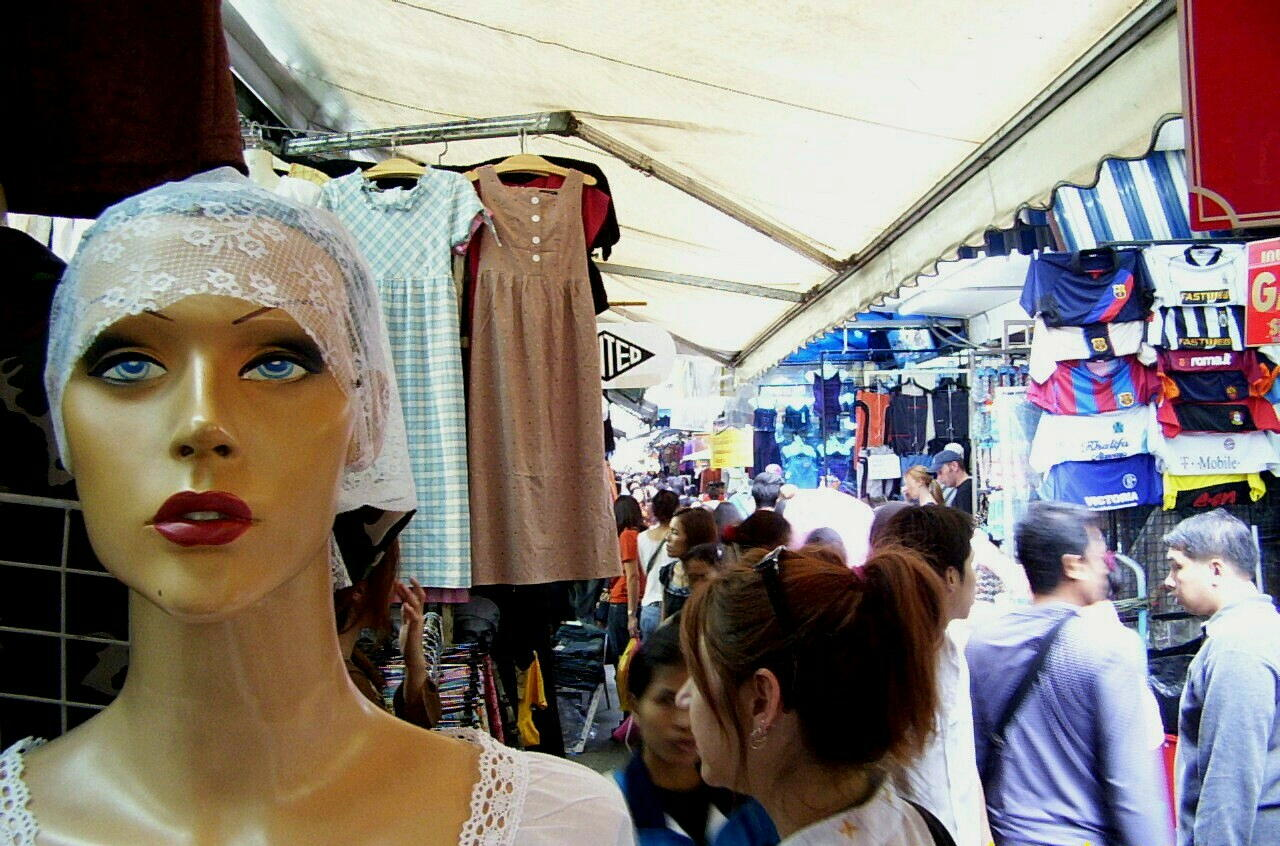
Pratunam Market

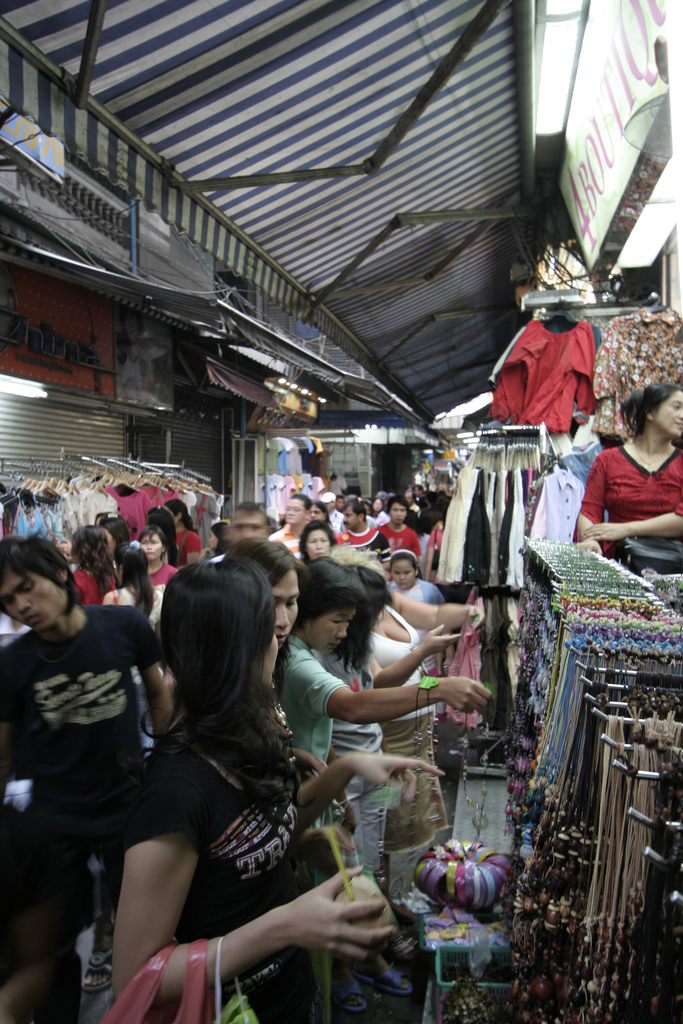
Pratunam Market

Pratunam Market (Thai: ประตูน้ำ) is one of Bangkok's major markets, and is Thailand's largest clothing market. The name Pratunam means 'water gate'.

== Overview ==
The market includes retail stores and outdoor stalls, the latter aimed at tourists. It is at the intersection of Ratchaprarop and Phetburi Roads in the Ratchathewi District. This is may be the cheapest market for buying clothing,, fabrics, and textiles in central Bangkok, while the Chatuchak Weekend Market probably is the low price leader. Other merchandise includes watches, handicrafts, and more.

The Pratunam Market covers the whole area around and behind the Amari Watergate and Indra Regent Hotels with the rainbow-colored Baiyoke I hotel and the towering Baiyoke Tower II hotels inside it.

== See also ==
- Markets in Bangkok
