= Suan Lum Night Bazaar Ratchadaphisek =

Suan Lum Night Bazaar Ratchada
- Location: Ratchadaphisek Road, Chatuchak District, Bangkok, Thailand
- Coordinates: 13.8047°N 100.5746°E
- Opened: 23 December 2015
- Developer: PCon Development
- Manager: Pairojana Toongtong
- Owner: PCon Development
- Num. of stores: 150
- Parking: 1000 + 20 for tourbuses

Suan Lum Night Bazaar Ratchadaphisek or The Bazaar Ratchadaphisek (Thai: สวนลุมไนท์บาซาร์ รัชดาภิเษก) is a mixed-use complex in the Chatuchak District of Bangkok. The complex is a groundscraper extending for about 1.5 kilometers and contains two hotels, offices, shops, restaurants, a 24-hour supermarket, convenience stores, gyms, and a 450-seat theater. The complex contains the 800-room Bazaar Hotel and the Podstel Hostel Bangkok, which hosts over 100 beds.

== Suan Lum Night Bazaar ==
The developer of this project is the same owner of Suan Lum Night Bazaar, next to Lumpini Park in Bangkok. Due to the expired lease PCon Development (the owner of Suan Lum) is building this large scale mall and open air market. Some of the vendors from the previous Suan Lum Night Bazaar have moved to this new location. The landlord of the former location is the Crown Property Bureau which leased the land to Central Group.

== Ratchada Night Market ==
The building partially replaced the Ratchada Night Market, which was owned by the same developer. Between 2010 and 2012, most vendors relocated due to the complex's construction. Many relocated to the Train Night Market or Siam Gypsy Junction.

== Transportation ==
- Bus: Lines 8, 27, 44, 73, 92, 96, 145, 191, 186, 502, 514, 545
- MRT: Lat Phrao MRT Station (Blue and Yellow Lines) and Ratchadaphisek MRT Station (Blue Line)

== Shopping ==
The market has two zones, indoors and outdoors. Vendors indoors sell a variety of souvenirs, home decorations, arts, clothes, shoes, and other tourist goods. The outdoor zone includes local food stalls, a variety of restaurants, a sports bar, and Boots and 7-11 convenience stores.
