= Siam Gypsy Junction =

Night market in Bangkok, Thailand

Siam Gypsy Junction is a night market in the Bang Sue District of Bangkok. It is located alongside a 1.6-kilometre (0.99 mi) stretch of railway tracks near Bang Son Station, under the elevated Bang Sue–Taling Chan Red Line. The market mainly features vintage goods, and is decorated in a quasi-Wild-West theme.

The market originated as a regular gathering of vintage vehicle enthusiasts, led by Seksak Sangsuwan, who is now its manager. The gatherings began in the 1990s in the area of the Royal Plaza, and moved to Makkhawan Rangsan Bridge and Bang Krabue before settling on the corner of Ratchada–Lat Phrao Intersection, where it became known as the Ratchada Night market. Retail activity began with exchanges of parts and collectable vintage items, and gradually expanded to serve a large number of visitors. In 2012, to make way for development work on Suan Lum Night Bazaar Ratchadaphisek, the market moved into the JJ Green community mall near Chatuchak Park, and in 2015, with 100 million-baht (US$3 million) in investment from business tycoon Chatchawal Kong-udom and a 30-year lease from the State Railway of Thailand, it reopened as the Siam Gypsy Junction at Bang Son.
