= Suan Lum Night Bazaar =

Former night market in Bangkok, Thailand

Coordinates: 13°43′39″N 100°32′43″E

Suam Lum Night Night Bazaar
- สวนลุมไนท์บาซาร์
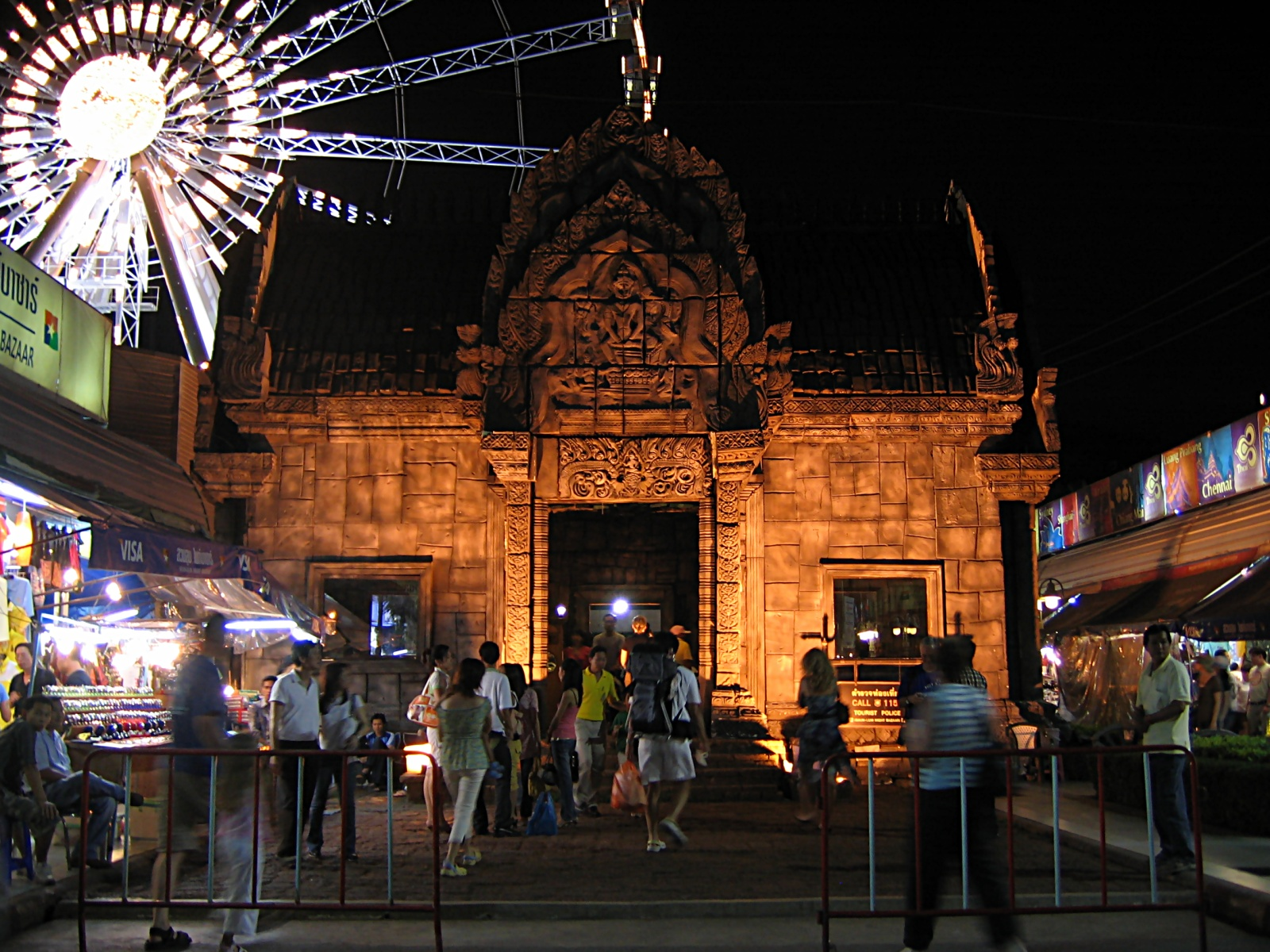
- Suam Lum Night Night Bazaar In 2006
- Location: Separate Witthayu Khwaeng Lumphini Pathum Wan district Bangkok
- Opened: 2001
- Closed: 2011
- Developer: P Con Development
- Owner: The Crown Property Bureau

Suan Lum Night Bazaar was a market in Bangkok's Pathum Wan district, at the intersection of Rama IV and Wireless/Sathorn Roads, opposite Lumphini Park at the MRT's Lumphini Station. Located on land owned by the Crown Property Bureau. It opened in 2001, and had closed by early 2011.

The Night Bazaar was open from 9 pm, with some shops open later. It had vendors selling gifts, clothing, jewellery, fruit, compact discs, handmade products like tapestries and fine arts, such as paintings and sculptures. There was a large beer garden, with an array of food available, and live entertainment. On the other side of the market there was a quieter area with many restaurants offering both inside and outside garden seating.

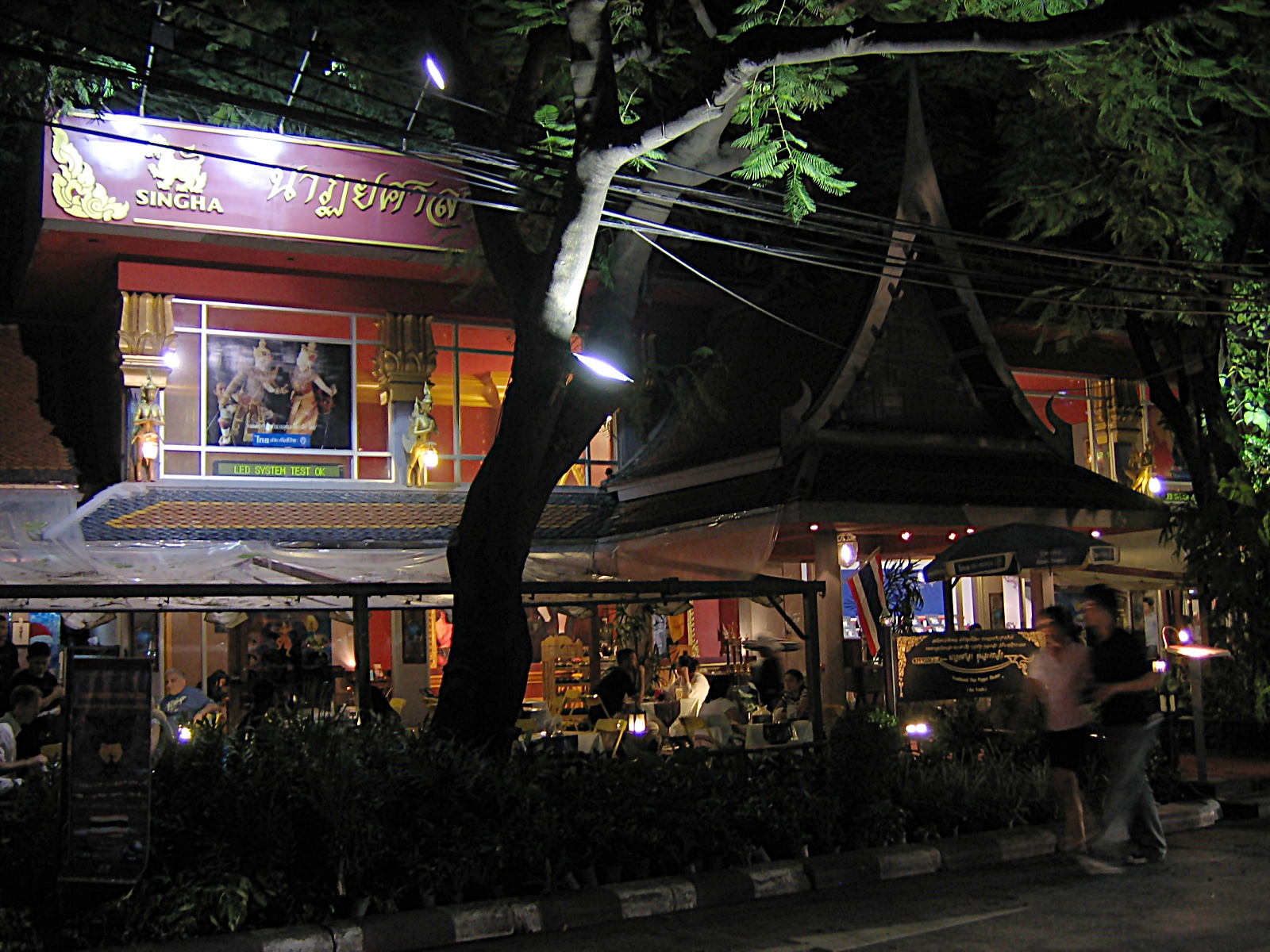
Joe Louis Puppet Theatre

Bangkok Hall, a 6,000-capacity entertainment and special events hall, was located in the Night Bazaar. Until March 2007, it was called BEC-TERO Hall, and was primarily used by the media company to stage concerts. Also in the Night Bazaar was the Joe Louis Puppet Theatre, a traditional Thai puppet troupe that give performances of the Ramakien, Thailand's national epic.

== Closing of Suan Lum ==
The property was leased from the Crown Property Bureau by P Con Development until March 31, 2006. Tenants were given until April 2007 to vacate the premises, but until late 2010 many vendors remained open. As of early 2011, the night bazaar is now closed, and the area where the market used to stand is now occupied by One Bangkok, a residential and shopping complex that opened in 2024.

== Relocating to Suan Lum Night Bazaar Ratchadaphisek ==
The developer of Suan Lum nightbazaar has bought a large piece of land on Ratchadaphisek Rd. It plans to build a large mixed-use development, called Ratchada Night Bazaar. Most vendors will move to the new location. There is currently no market at Ratchadaphisek-Ladprao, the place is now a construction site.

== See also ==
- Markets in Bangkok
