= Wat Sai Yai =

Coordinates: 13.978136°N 100.310609°E

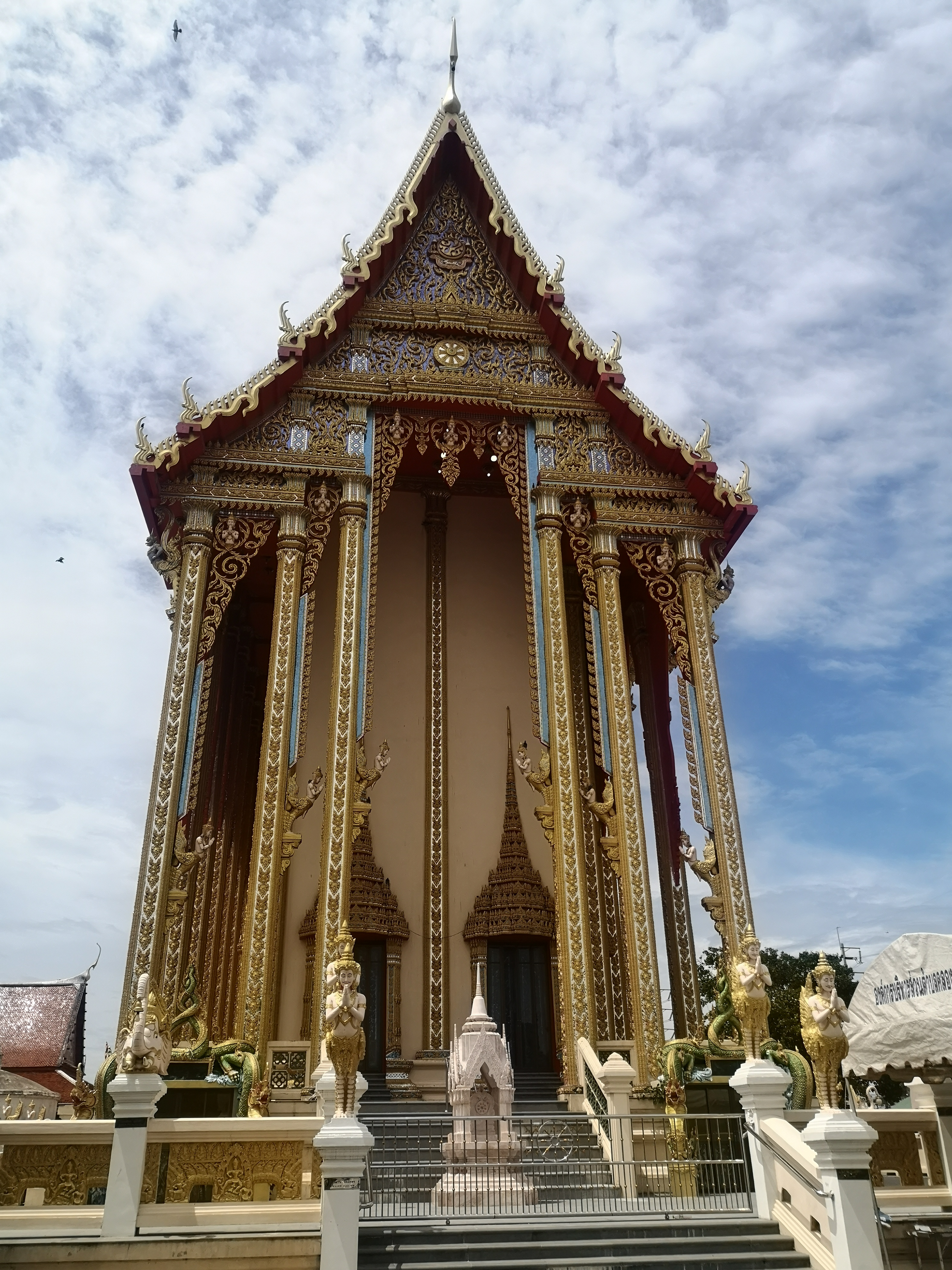
Wat Sai Yai

Wat Sai Yai (Thai: วัดไทรใหญ่, lit. 'large banyan tree temple') is an old temple in Sai Noi District, Nonthaburi, Thailand. It is located at 65 Moo 5 Ban-Sai Yai, Sainoi-Toncheuk Road, Nonthaburi Thailand.

== History ==
Wat Saiyai was established in 1867 during the reign of Rama IV (King Mongkut). In the past, this temple was formerly named “Wat Maharnichortahram” which means big banyan temple. But, the old name was very hard to pronounce. Later the name was changed to “Wat Saiyai” in 1955. Wat Saiyai has the old Buddha image “Luang-PhorThongKhum” which is a very sacred Buddha image from the U-thong area, and is worshiped by the locals. Wat Saiyai has two chapels, the old one is a teak chapel which built at the same time as the temple. Later, the temple commenced building a new chapel in 2013 and finished in 2016. The old chapel has the 10 last jatakas of Buddha murals painting, Buddha relics, and foretell iron elephant. Beside the chapel there is a staircase for walk through to the underground area of the chapel.

Wat Saiyai is not just a place to pay respect to the Buddha image, make merit, and donate to the temple. It also has a floating market named "Sainoi floating market". Sainoi floating market was opened on July 14, 2002 by a local farmer from the Sainoi area. They sold agricultural products at this market. Sainoi floating market is located along Khlong Phra Pimon Racha canal near to the temple. Inside the market there are many type of products, such as, desserts, foods, fruits, and vegetables. Next to the temple is a primary school in patronage of Wat Saiyai.
