= Wat Nimmanoradee Floating Market =

Market in Bangkok, Thailand

Coordinates: 13.707487°N 100.427154°E

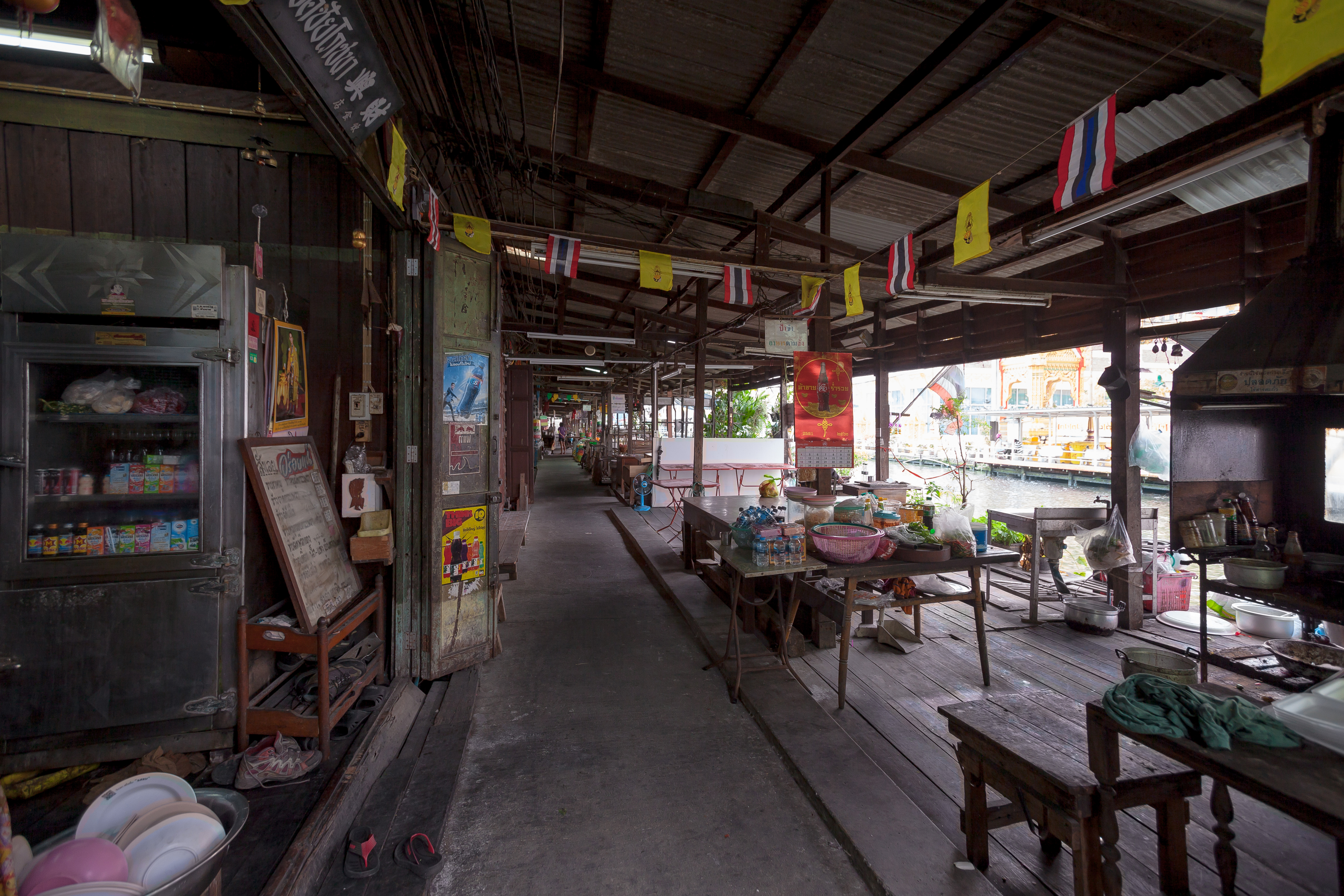
Wat Nimmanoradee Floating Market in 2018

Wat Nimmanoradee Floating Market was built in Bangkok, Thailand in the Rattanakosin Era 120 or AD 1902. It is an ancient market located opposite Nimmanoradee Temple with Khlong Phasi Charoen flowing between them. Even though the market is very old, it has been maintained to have the same environment and activities as in the past, such as the old-style wooden houses, selling food, paying respect to the Buddha and the rowing of boats along the canal.

In the market, there are many restaurants with many kinds of modern and traditional food. Also, there is a traditional retail store selling antique appliances, toys, snacks from 20–30 years ago that are rare in the present market. There is a Thai traditional clinic to cure diseases by using Thai herbal treatment and Thai massage. Another zone of the market is a relaxation area with a variety of trees and flowers where tourists can rest. In addition, there are an art exhibition gallery for people who enjoy artwork and a local museum that tells the story and the lifestyle of people in this community in the past.

Wat Nimmanoradee Floating Market was rehabilitated by the Phasi Charoen District Office in January 2010, but as of now (2023), the market conditions have deteriorated considerably. Until it can be said that the condition of the floating market is no longer. There are only a few houses serving as restaurants.
